= List of American films of 1947 =

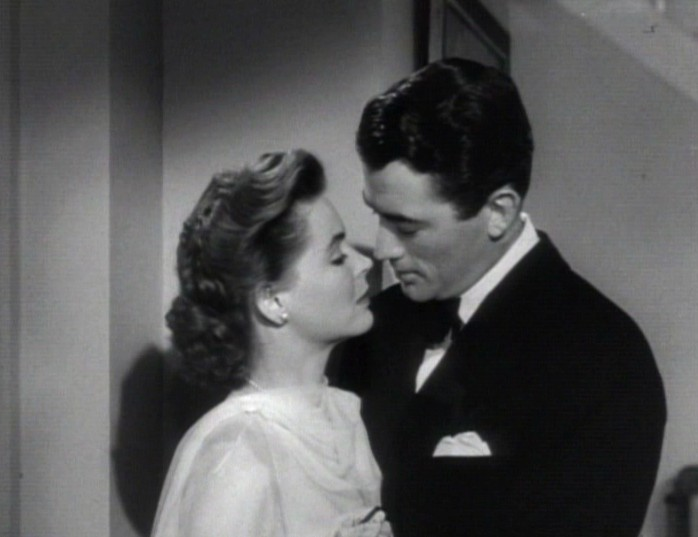
Dorothy McGuire and Gregory Peck in Gentleman's Agreement

More than 370 American feature films were released in 1947.

Gentleman's Agreement won Best Picture at the Academy Awards.

== A-B ==
Title	Director	Cast	Genre	Notes
13 Rue Madeleine	Henry Hathaway	James Cagney, Richard Conte, Annabella	Thriller	20th Century Fox
Adventure Island	Sam Newfield	Rhonda Fleming, Rory Calhoun, Paul Kelly	Adventure	Paramount
The Adventures of Don Coyote	Reginald LeBorg	Richard Martin, Frances Rafferty, Frank Fenton	Western	United Artists
Along the Oregon Trail	R. G. Springsteen	Monte Hale, Lorna Gray, Roy Barcroft	Western	Republic
Always Together	Fred de Cordova	Joyce Reynolds, Robert Hutton, Cecil Kellaway	Comedy	Warner Bros.
Angel and the Badman	James Edward Grant	John Wayne, Gail Russell, Bruce Cabot	Western	Republic
Apache Rose	William Witney	Roy Rogers, Dale Evans, Olin Howland	Western	Republic
The Arnelo Affair	Arch Oboler	John Hodiak, Frances Gifford, George Murphy	Crime	MGM
The Bachelor and the Bobby-Soxer	Irving Reis	Cary Grant, Shirley Temple, Myrna Loy	Comedy	RKO
Backlash	Eugene Forde	Jean Rogers, Richard Travis, John Eldredge	Film noir	20th Century Fox
Bandits of Dark Canyon	Philip Ford	Allan Lane, Bob Steele, Roy Barcroft	Western	Republic
Banjo	Richard Fleischer	Sharyn Moffett, Jacqueline White, Walter Reed	Drama	RKO
Beat the Band	John H. Auer	Frances Langford, Ralph Edwards, Phillip Terry	Musical	RKO
The Beginning or the End	Norman Taurog	Brian Donlevy, Hume Cronyn, Beverly Tyler	Drama	MGM
Bells of San Angelo	William Witney	Roy Rogers, Dale Evans, Andy Devine	Western	Republic
Bells of San Fernando	Terry O. Morse	Gloria Warren, Donald Woods, Shirley O'Hara	Adventure	Lippert
The Big Fix	James Flood	James Brown, Sheila Ryan, Regis Toomey	Drama	PRC
Big Town	William C. Thomas	Phillip Reed, Hillary Brooke, Veda Ann Borg	Crime	Paramount
Big Town After Dark	William C. Thomas	Phillip Reed, Hillary Brooke, Richard Travis	Crime	Paramount
The Bishop's Wife	Henry Koster	Cary Grant, David Niven, Loretta Young	Comedy	RKO
Black Gold	Phil Karlson	Anthony Quinn, Katherine DeMille, Raymond Hatton	Adventure	Allied Artists
Black Hills	Ray Taylor	Eddie Dean, Shirley Patterson, Roscoe Ates	Western	PRC
Blackmail	Lesley Selander	William Marshall, Ricardo Cortez, Adele Mara	Crime	Republic
Blaze of Noon	John Farrow	Anne Baxter, William Holden, Sonny Tufts	Drama	Paramount
Blind Spot	Robert Gordon	Chester Morris, Constance Dowling, Steven Geray	Thriller	Columbia
Blonde Savage	Steve Sekely	Leif Erickson, Gale Sherwood, Veda Ann Borg	Adventure	PRC
Blondie's Anniversary	Abby Berlin	Penny Singleton, Arthur Lake, Adele Jergens	Comedy	Columbia
Blondie's Big Moment	Abby Berlin	Penny Singleton, Arthur Lake, Anita Louise	Comedy	Columbia
Blondie's Holiday	Abby Berlin	Penny Singleton, Arthur Lake, Jerome Cowan	Comedy	Columbia
Blondie in the Dough	Abby Berlin	Penny Singleton, Arthur Lake, Jerome Cowan	Comedy	Columbia
Body and Soul	Robert Rossen	John Garfield, Lilli Palmer, Hazel Brooks	Film noir	United Artists
Boomerang	Elia Kazan	Dana Andrews, Jane Wyatt, Lee J. Cobb	Crime	20th Century Fox
Border Feud	Ray Taylor	Lash LaRue, Al St. John, Ian Keith	Western	PRC
Born to Kill	Robert Wise	Lawrence Tierney, Claire Trevor, Walter Slezak	Film noir	RKO
Born to Speed	Edward L. Cahn	Johnny Sands, Vivian Austin, Don Castle	Action	PRC
Bowery Buckaroos	William Beaudine	Leo Gorcey, Huntz Hall, Julie Gibson	Comedy	Monogram
The Brasher Doubloon	John Brahm	George Montgomery, Nancy Guild, Fritz Kortner	Crime drama	20th Century Fox
Brute Force	Jules Dassin	Burt Lancaster, Hume Cronyn, Yvonne De Carlo	Film noir	Universal
Buck Privates Come Home	Charles Barton	Abbott and Costello, Joan Shawlee, Nat Pendleton	Comedy	Universal
Buckaroo from Powder River	Ray Nazarro	Charles Starrett, Eve Miller, Forrest Taylor	Western	Columbia
Buffalo Bill Rides Again	Bernard B. Ray	Richard Arlen, Jennifer Holt, Lee Shumway	Western	Lippert
Bulldog Drummond at Bay	Sidney Salkow	Ron Randell, Anita Louise, Patrick O'Moore	Mystery	Columbia
Bulldog Drummond Strikes Back	Frank McDonald	Ron Randell, Gloria Henry, Patrick O'Moore	Thriller	Columbia
The Burning Cross	Walter Colmes	Virginia Patton, John Doucette, Joel Fluellen	Drama	Lippert
Bury Me Dead	Bernard Vorhaus	Cathy O'Donnell, June Lockhart, Hugh Beaumont	Film noir	Eagle-Lion
Bush Pilot	Sterling Campbell	Rochelle Hudson, Jack La Rue, Austin Willis	Drama	Lippert

== C-D ==
Title	Director	Cast	Genre	Notes
Calcutta	John Farrow	Alan Ladd, Gail Russell, June Duprez	Crime	Paramount
Calendar Girl	Allan Dwan	Jane Frazee, Gail Patrick, William Marshall	Musical	Republic
California	John Farrow	Barbara Stanwyck, Ray Milland, Barry Fitzgerald	Western	Paramount
Captain from Castile	Henry King	Tyrone Power, Jean Peters, Cesar Romero	Historical	20th Century Fox
Carnegie Hall	Edgar G. Ulmer	Marsha Hunt, William Prince, Frank McHugh	Musical	United Artists
Carnival in Costa Rica	Gregory Ratoff	Vera-Ellen, Dick Haymes, Cesar Romero	Musical	20th Century Fox
Cass Timberlane	George Sidney	Spencer Tracy, Lana Turner, Zachary Scott	Drama	MGM
Cheyenne	Raoul Walsh	Jane Wyman, Dennis Morgan, Janis Paige	Western	Warner Bros.
Cheyenne Takes Over	Ray Taylor	Lash LaRue, Al St. John, Nancy Gates	Western	PRC
The Chinese Ring	William Beaudine	Roland Winters, Warren Douglas, Mantan Moreland	Mystery	Monogram. Charlie Chan
Christmas Eve	Edwin L. Marin	George Raft, Randolph Scott, Joan Blondell	Comedy	United Artists
Cigarette Girl	Gunther von Fritsch	Leslie Brooks, Jimmy Lloyd, Ludwig Donath	Comedy	Columbia
Code of the Saddle	Thomas Carr	Johnny Mack Brown, Raymond Hatton, Kay Morley	Western	Monogram
Code of the West	William A. Berke	Steve Brodie, James Warren, Robert Clarke	Western	RKO
Copacabana	Alfred E. Green	Groucho Marx, Carmen Miranda, Steve Cochran	Comedy	United Artists
The Corpse Came C.O.D.	Henry Levin	George Brent, Joan Blondell, Adele Jergens	Comedy	Columbia
The Crime Doctor's Gamble	William Castle	Warner Baxter, Micheline Cheirel, Steven Geray	Mystery	Columbia. One of series
The Crimson Key	Eugene Forde	Kent Taylor, Doris Dowling, Dennis Hoey	Mystery	20th Century Fox
Crossfire	Edward Dmytryk	Robert Young, Robert Mitchum, Robert Ryan	Film noir	RKO; 5 Academy Award nominations
Cry Wolf	Peter Godfrey	Errol Flynn, Barbara Stanwyck, Geraldine Brooks	Mystery	Warner Bros.
Curley	Bernard Carr	Frances Rafferty, Billy Gray, Eilene Janssen	Comedy	United Artists
Cynthia	Robert Z. Leonard	Elizabeth Taylor, Mary Astor, George Murphy	Comedy drama	MGM
Daisy Kenyon	Otto Preminger	Joan Crawford, Henry Fonda, Dana Andrews	Drama	20th Century Fox
Danger Street	Lew Landers	Jane Withers, Robert Lowery, Elaine Riley	Mystery	Paramount
Dangerous Venture	George Archainbaud	William Boyd, Andy Clyde, Rand Brooks	Western	United Artists
Dangerous Years	Arthur Pierson	Billy Halop, Ann E. Todd, Scotty Beckett	Drama	20th Century Fox. Marilyn Monroe debut
Dark Delusion	Willis Goldbeck	Lionel Barrymore, James Craig, Lucille Bremer	Drama	MGM
Dark Passage	Delmer Daves	Humphrey Bogart, Lauren Bacall, Bruce Bennett	Film noir	Warner Bros.
Dead Reckoning	John Cromwell	Humphrey Bogart, Lizabeth Scott, William Prince	Film noir	Columbia
Dear Ruth	William D. Russell	Joan Caulfield, William Holden, Mona Freeman	Comedy	Paramount
Deep Valley	Jean Negulesco	Ida Lupino, Dane Clark, Fay Bainter	Drama	Warner Bros.
Desert Fury	Lewis Allen	John Hodiak, Lizabeth Scott, Burt Lancaster	Film noir	Paramount
Desire Me	No director credited	Greer Garson, Robert Mitchum, Richard Hart	Drama	MGM
Desperate	Anthony Mann	Steve Brodie, Audrey Long, Raymond Burr	Drama	RKO
Devil Ship	Lew Landers	Richard Lane, Louise Campbell, William Bishop	Crime	Columbia
The Devil Thumbs a Ride	Felix E. Feist	Lawrence Tierney, Ted North, Betty Lawford	Drama	RKO
The Devil on Wheels	Crane Wilbur	Darryl Hickman, James Cardwell, Terry Moore	Drama	PRC
Dick Tracy Meets Gruesome	John Rawlins	Ralph Byrd, Anne Gwynne, Boris Karloff	Thriller	RKO; based on comic strip
Dick Tracy's Dilemma	John Rawlins	Ralph Byrd, Kay Christopher, Jack Lambert	Crime	RKO
Dishonored Lady	Robert Stevenson	Hedy Lamarr, Dennis O'Keefe, John Loder	Film noir	United Artists
A Double Life	George Cukor	Ronald Colman, Signe Hasso, Shelley Winters	Film noir	Universal. Oscar for Colman
Down to Earth	Alexander Hall	Rita Hayworth, Larry Parks, Roland Culver	Fantasy	Columbia. Sequel to Here Comes Mr. Jordan
Dragnet	Leslie Goodwins	Henry Wilcoxon, Mary Brian, Virginia Dale	Crime	Lippert
Driftwood	Allan Dwan	Ruth Warrick, Walter Brennan, Dean Jagger	Drama	Republic

== E-F ==
Title	Director	Cast	Genre	Notes
Easy Come, Easy Go	John Farrow	Barry Fitzgerald, Diana Lynn, Sonny Tufts	Comedy drama	Paramount
The Egg and I	Chester Erskine	Fred MacMurray, Claudette Colbert, Marjorie Main	Comedy	Universal
Escape Me Never	Peter Godfrey	Errol Flynn, Ida Lupino, Eleanor Parker	Drama	Warner Bros.
The Exile	Max Ophüls	Douglas Fairbanks Jr., Maria Montez, Rita Corday	Adventure	Universal
Exposed	George Blair	Adele Mara, Lorna Gray, Mark Roberts	Crime	Republic
The Fabulous Dorseys	Alfred E. Green	Tommy Dorsey, Jimmy Dorsey, Janet Blair	Biopic	United Artists
The Fabulous Joe	Harve Foster	Walter Abel, Marie Wilson, Margot Grahame	Comedy	United Artists
The Fabulous Texan	Edward Ludwig	Wild Bill Elliott, Catherine McLeod, John Carroll	Western	Republic
Fall Guy	Reginald LeBorg	Leo Penn, Robert Armstrong, Teala Loring	Drama	Monogram
The Farmer's Daughter	H. C. Potter	Loretta Young, Joseph Cotten, Ethel Barrymore	Comedy	RKO; Oscar for Young
Fear in the Night	Maxwell Shane	DeForest Kelley, Paul Kelly, Ann Doran	Horror	Paramount
Fiesta	Richard Thorpe	Esther Williams, Ricardo Montalbán, John Carroll	Musical drama	MGM
The Fighting Vigilantes	Ray Taylor	Lash LaRue, Jennifer Holt, George Chesebro	Western	PRC
The Flame	John H. Auer	John Carroll, Vera Ralston, Robert Paige	Film noir	Republic
Flashing Guns	Lambert Hillyer	Johnny Mack Brown, Raymond Hatton, Riley Hill	Western	Monogram
Fool's Gold	George Archainbaud	William Boyd, Jane Randolph, Andy Clyde	Western	United Artists
For the Love of Rusty	John Sturges	Ted Donaldson, Tom Powers, Ann Doran	Family	Columbia
Forever Amber	Otto Preminger	Linda Darnell, Cornel Wilde, George Sanders	Drama	20th Century Fox; based on the novel
For You I Die	John Reinhardt	Cathy Downs, Paul Langton, Mischa Auer	Film noir	Film Classics
The Foxes of Harrow	John M. Stahl	Rex Harrison, Maureen O'Hara, Victor McLaglen	Adventure	20th Century Fox
Framed	Richard Wallace	Glenn Ford, Janis Carter, Barry Sullivan	Film noir	Columbia
The Fugitive	John Ford	Henry Fonda, Dolores del Río, Pedro Armendáriz	Drama	RKO
Fun and Fancy Free	4 directors	Edgar Bergen, Dinah Shore, Cliff Edwards	Animated	Disney, RKO
Fun on a Weekend	Andrew L. Stone	Eddie Bracken, Priscilla Lane, Tom Conway	Comedy	United Artists

== G-H ==
Title	Director	Cast	Genre	Notes
The Gangster	Gordon Wiles	Barry Sullivan, Belita, Joan Lorring	Film noir	Allied Artists
Gas House Kids Go West	William Beaudine	Emory Parnell, Vince Barnett, Benny Bartlett	Comedy	PRC
Gas House Kids in Hollywood	Edward L. Cahn	Carl Switzer, Benny Bartlett, Michael Whalen	Comedy	PRC
Gentleman's Agreement	Elia Kazan	Gregory Peck, John Garfield, Dorothy McGuire	Drama	20th Century Fox. Oscars for Kazan, Holm, Best Picture
The Ghost and Mrs. Muir	Joseph L. Mankiewicz	Gene Tierney, Rex Harrison, George Sanders	Romance	20th Century Fox; inspired TV series
The Ghost Goes Wild	George Blair	Anne Gwynne, James Ellison, Edward Everett Horton	Comedy	Republic
Ghost Town Renegades	Ray Taylor	Lash LaRue, Jennifer Holt, Jack Ingram	Western	PRC
Golden Earrings	Mitchell Leisen	Ray Milland, Marlene Dietrich, Bruce Lester	Drama	Paramount
Good News	Charles Walters	June Allyson, Peter Lawford, Mel Tormé	Musical	MGM
Green Dolphin Street	Victor Saville	Lana Turner, Van Heflin, Donna Reed	Drama	MGM
The Guilt of Janet Ames	Henry Levin	Rosalind Russell, Melvyn Douglas, Sid Caesar	Drama	Columbia
The Guilty	John Reinhardt	Bonita Granville, Don Castle, Regis Toomey	Drama	Monogram
Gunfighters	George Waggner	Randolph Scott, Barbara Britton, Bruce Cabot	Western	Columbia
Gun Talk	Lambert Hillyer	Johnny Mack Brown, Raymond Hatton, Christine McIntyre	Western	Monogram
Hard Boiled Mahoney	William Beaudine	Leo Gorcey, Huntz Hall, Teala Loring	Comedy	Monogram
Heading for Heaven	Lewis D. Collins	Stuart Erwin, Glenda Farrell, Irene Ryan	Comedy	Eagle-Lion
Heartaches	Basil Wrangell	Sheila Ryan, Edward Norris, James Seay	Mystery	PRC
Heaven Only Knows	Albert S. Rogell	Robert Cummings, Brian Donlevy, Marjorie Reynolds	Western	United Artists
Her Husband's Affairs	S. Sylvan Simon	Lucille Ball, Franchot Tone, Edward Everett Horton	Comedy	Columbia
Hi-De-Ho	Josh Binney	Cab Calloway, Jeni Le Gon, George Wiltshire	Musical drama	Independent
High Barbaree	Jack Conway	Van Johnson, June Allyson, Marilyn Maxwell	War	MGM
High Conquest	Irving Allen	Anna Lee, Gilbert Roland, Warren Douglas	Drama	Monogram
High Tide	John Reinhardt	Lee Tracy, Julie Bishop, Don Castle	Crime	Monogram
High Wall	Curtis Bernhardt	Robert Taylor, Audrey Totter, Herbert Marshall	Crime drama	MGM
Hit Parade of 1947	Frank McDonald	Eddie Albert, Constance Moore, Joan Edwards	Musical	Republic
Hollywood Barn Dance	Bernard B. Ray	Ernest Tubb, Helen Boyce, Earle Hodgins	Musical	Lippert
Homesteaders of Paradise Valley	R. G. Springsteen	Allan Lane, Martha Wentworth, Robert Blake	Western	Republic
The Homestretch	H. Bruce Humberstone	Cornel Wilde, Maureen O'Hara, Helen Walker	Drama	20th Century Fox
Honeymoon	William Keighley	Shirley Temple, Franchot Tone, Guy Madison	Comedy	RKO
Hoppy's Holiday	George Archainbaud	William Boyd, Andy Clyde, Rand Brooks	Western	United Artists
The Hucksters	Jack Conway	Clark Gable, Deborah Kerr, Sydney Greenstreet	Drama	MGM

== I-J ==
Title	Director	Cast	Genre	Notes
I Cover Big Town	William C. Thomas	Hillary Brooke, Phillip Reed, Robert Lowery	Drama	Paramount
If Winter Comes	Victor Saville	Walter Pidgeon, Deborah Kerr, Angela Lansbury	Drama	MGM
I'll Be Yours	William A. Seiter	Deanna Durbin, Tom Drake, William Bendix, Adolphe Menjou	Musical comedy	Universal
The Imperfect Lady	Lewis Allen	Ray Milland, Teresa Wright, Cedric Hardwicke	Drama	Paramount
Intrigue	Edwin L. Marin	George Raft, Helena Carter, June Havoc	Crime	United Artists
The Invisible Wall	Eugene Forde	Virginia Christine, Don Castle, Richard Gaines	Crime	20th Century Fox
It Had to Be You	Rudolph Maté	Ginger Rogers, Cornel Wilde, Ron Randell	Comedy	Columbia
It Happened in Brooklyn	Richard Whorf	Frank Sinatra, Kathryn Grayson, Peter Lawford	Comedy	MGM
It Happened on 5th Avenue	Roy Del Ruth	Don DeFore, Ann Harding, Charles Ruggles	Comedy	Allied Artists
It's a Joke, Son!	Benjamin Stoloff	Kenny Delmar, Una Merkel, June Lockhart	Comedy	Eagle-Lion
Ivy	Sam Wood	Joan Fontaine, Patric Knowles, Herbert Marshall	Film noir	Universal
I Wonder Who's Kissing Her Now	Lloyd Bacon	June Haver, Mark Stevens, Martha Stewart	Musical	20th Century Fox
Jewels of Brandenburg	Eugene Forde	Richard Travis, Micheline Cheirel, Leonard Strong	Crime	20th Century Fox
Jiggs and Maggie in Society	Edward F. Cline	Joe Yule, Renie Riano, Wanda McKay	Crime	Monogram
Joe Palooka in the Knockout	Reginald LeBorg	Joe Kirkwood Jr., Leon Errol, Trudy Marshall	Comedy	Monogram. One of series
Johnny O'Clock	Robert Rossen	Dick Powell, Evelyn Keyes, Lee J. Cobb	Film noir	Columbia
Jungle Flight	Sam Newfield	Robert Lowery, Ann Savage, Barton MacLane	Adventure	Paramount

== K-L ==
Title	Director	Cast	Genre	Notes
Keeper of the Bees	John Sturges	Gloria Henry, Jane Darwell, Harry Davenport	Drama	Columbia
Key Witness	D. Ross Lederman	Trudy Marshall, John Beal, Helen Mowery	Crime drama	Columbia
Killer at Large	William Beaudine	Robert Lowery, Anabel Shaw, Frank Ferguson	Crime	PRC
Killer Dill	Lewis D. Collins	Stuart Erwin, Anne Gwynne, Mike Mazurki	Crime comedy	Lippert
Killer McCoy	Roy Rowland	Mickey Rooney, Brian Donlevy, Ann Blyth	Drama	MGM
Kilroy Was Here	Phil Karlson	Jackie Cooper, Jackie Coogan, Wanda McKay	Comedy	Monogram
Kiss of Death	Henry Hathaway	Victor Mature, Brian Donlevy, Richard Widmark	Film noir	20th Century Fox; 2 Oscar nominations
King of the Bandits	Christy Cabanne	Gilbert Roland, Angela Greene, Anthony Warde	Western	Monogram
King of the Wild Horses	George Archainbaud	Preston Foster, Gail Patrick, Guinn "Big Boy" Williams	Western	Columbia
Ladies' Man	William D. Russell	Eddie Bracken, Cass Daley, Virginia Field	Comedy	Paramount
The Lady from Shanghai	Orson Welles	Rita Hayworth, Orson Welles, Everett Sloane	Film noir	Columbia
Lady in the Lake	Robert Montgomery	Robert Montgomery, Audrey Totter, Lloyd Nolan	Film noir	MGM; based on book by Raymond Chandler
Land of the Lawless	Lambert Hillyer	Johnny Mack Brown, Raymond Hatton, Christine McIntyre	Western	Monogram
Last Days of Boot Hill	Ray Nazarro	Charles Starrett, Paul Campbell, Virginia Hunter	Western	Columbia
Last Frontier Uprising	Lesley Selander	Monte Hale, Lorna Gray, Roy Barcroft	Western	Republic
Last of the Redmen	George Sherman	Jon Hall, Michael O'Shea, Evelyn Ankers	Adventure	Columbia
The Last Round-Up	John English	Gene Autry, Jean Heather, Ralph Morgan	Western	Columbia; Remake of 1934 film
The Late George Apley	Joseph L. Mankiewicz	Ronald Colman, Vanessa Brown, Peggy Cummins	Comedy	20th Century Fox
The Law Comes to Gunsight	Lambert Hillyer	Johnny Mack Brown, Raymond Hatton, Reno Browne	Western	Monogram
Law of the Canyon	Ray Nazarro	Charles Starrett, Nancy Saunders, Smiley Burnette	Western	Columbia
Law of the Lash	Ray Taylor	Lash LaRue, Al St. John, Lee Roberts	Western	PRC
Life with Father	Michael Curtiz	William Powell, Irene Dunne, Elizabeth Taylor	Comedy	Warner Bros.; based on the book
Lighthouse	Frank Wisbar	Don Castle, June Lang, Marion Martin	Drama	PRC
A Likely Story	H. C. Potter	Barbara Hale, Bill Williams, Sam Levene	Comedy	RKO
Linda, Be Good	Frank McDonald	Elyse Knox, Marie Wilson, John Hubbard	Comedy	Eagle-Lion
Little Miss Broadway	Arthur Dreifuss	Jean Porter, John Shelton, Ruth Donnelly	Musical	Columbia
Living in a Big Way	Gregory LaCava	Gene Kelly, Marie McDonald, Charles Winninger	Musical	MGM
Louisiana	Phil Karlson	Jimmie Davis, Margaret Lindsay, John Gallaudet	Drama	Monogram
The Lone Hand Texan	Ray Nazarro	Charles Starrett, Smiley Burnette, George Chesebro	Western	Columbia
The Lone Wolf in London	Leslie Goodwins	Gerald Mohr, Nancy Saunders, Eric Blore	Mystery	Columbia
The Lone Wolf in Mexico	D. Ross Lederman	Gerald Mohr, Sheila Ryan, Eric Blore	Mystery	Columbia
The Long Night	Anatole Litvak	Henry Fonda, Barbara Bel Geddes, Vincent Price	Film noir	RKO
Lost Honeymoon	Leigh Jason	Franchot Tone, Ann Richards, Tom Conway	Comedy	Eagle-Lion
The Lost Moment	Martin Gabel	Susan Hayward, Robert Cummings, Agnes Moorehead	Horror	Universal
Love and Learn	Frederick de Cordova	Jack Carson, Martha Vickers, Robert Hutton	Comedy	Warner Bros.
Love from a Stranger	Richard Whorf	John Hodiak, Sylvia Sidney, Ann Richards	Film Noir	Eagle-Lion
Lured	Douglas Sirk	Lucille Ball, George Sanders, Charles Coburn	Film noir	United Artists

== M-N ==
Title	Director	Cast	Genre	Notes
The Macomber Affair	Zoltan Korda	Gregory Peck, Joan Bennett, Robert Preston	Drama	United Artists
Magic Town	William Wellman	James Stewart, Jane Wyman, Kent Smith	Comedy	RKO
The Man I Love	Raoul Walsh	Ida Lupino, Robert Alda, Andrea King	Drama	Warner Bros.
The Marauders	George Archainbaud	William Boyd, Andy Clyde, Rand Brooks	Western	United Artists
Marshal of Cripple Creek	R. G. Springsteen	Allan Lane, Martha Wentworth, Trevor Bardette	Western	Republic
Merton of the Movies	Robert Alton	Red Skelton, Virginia O'Brien, Gloria Grahame	Comedy	MGM
The Michigan Kid	Ray Taylor	Jon Hall, Victor McLaglen, Rita Johnson, Andy Devine	Western	Universal
The Mighty McGurk	John Waters	Wallace Beery, Dean Stockwell, Edward Arnold	Drama	MGM
The Millerson Case	George Archainbaud	Warner Baxter, Nancy Saunders, Clem Bevans	Mystery	Columbia
Millie's Daughter	Sidney Salkow	Gladys George, Paul Campbell, Ruth Donnelly	Drama	Columbia
Miracle on 34th Street	George Seaton	Edmund Gwenn, Maureen O'Hara, John Payne	Romantic comedy	20th Century Fox; Oscars for Gwenn, screenplay
Monsieur Verdoux	Charles Chaplin	Charles Chaplin, Martha Raye, William Frawley	Comedy	United Artists
Moss Rose	Gregory Ratoff	Peggy Cummins, Victor Mature, Ethel Barrymore	Thriller	20th Century Fox
Mother Wore Tights	Walter Lang	Betty Grable, Dan Dailey, Mona Freeman	Musical	20th Century Fox
Mourning Becomes Electra	Dudley Nichols	Rosalind Russell, Michael Redgrave, Raymond Massey	Drama	RKO
Mr. District Attorney	Robert B. Sinclair	Dennis O'Keefe, Adolphe Menjou, Marguerite Chapman	Crime	Columbia
My Brother Talks to Horses	Fred Zinnemann	Butch Jenkins, Peter Lawford, Beverly Tyler	Comedy	MGM
My Favorite Brunette	Elliott Nugent	Bob Hope, Dorothy Lamour, Peter Lorre	Comedy	Paramount
My Wild Irish Rose	David Butler	Dennis Morgan, Arlene Dahl, Andrea King	Musical	Warner Bros.
New Orleans	Arthur Lubin	Arturo de Córdova, Dorothy Patrick, Marjorie Lord	Musical	United Artists
News Hounds	William Beaudine	Leo Gorcey, Huntz Hall, Christine McIntyre	Comedy	Monogram
Nightmare Alley	Edmund Goulding	Tyrone Power, Joan Blondell, Coleen Gray	Film noir	20th Century Fox; based on the book
Nora Prentiss	Vincent Sherman	Ann Sheridan, Kent Smith, Robert Alda	Drama	Warner Bros.
Northwest Outpost	Allan Dwan	Nelson Eddy, Ilona Massey, Joseph Schildkraut	Musical	Republic

== O-Q ==
Title	Director	Cast	Genre	Notes
On the Old Spanish Trail	William Witney	Roy Rogers, Tito Guízar, Jane Frazee	Western	Republic
Oregon Trail Scouts	R. G. Springsteen	Allan Lane, Martha Wentworth Roy Barcroft	Western	Republic
The Other Love	Andre DeToth	Barbara Stanwyck, David Niven, Richard Conte	Film noir	United Artists
Out of the Blue	Leigh Jason	Virginia Mayo, Ann Dvorak, Ann Dvorak	Comedy	Eagle-Lion Films
Out of the Past	Jacques Tourneur	Robert Mitchum, Jane Greer, Kirk Douglas	Film noir	RKO
Over the Santa Fe Trail	Ray Nazarro	Ken Curtis, Jennifer Holt, Guy Kibbee	Western	Columbia
The Paradine Case	Alfred Hitchcock	Gregory Peck, Charles Laughton, Alida Valli	Drama	United Artists
The Perfect Marriage	Lewis Allen	Loretta Young, David Niven, Virginia Field	Comedy	Paramount
The Perils of Pauline	George Marshall	Betty Hutton, John Lund, William Demarest	Comedy	Paramount
Philo Vance's Gamble	Basil Wrangell	Alan Curtis, Vivian Austin, Tala Birell	Mystery	PRC
Philo Vance Returns	William Beaudine	William Wright, Vivian Austin, Ramsay Ames	Mystery	PRC
Philo Vance's Secret Mission	Reginald LeBorg	Alan Curtis, Sheila Ryan, Tala Birell	Mystery	PRC
The Pilgrim Lady	Lesley Selander	Lynne Roberts, Warren Douglas, Alan Mowbray	Comedy	Republic
Pioneer Justice	Ray Taylor	Lash LaRue, Jennifer Holt, William Fawcett	Western	PRC
Pirates of Monterey	Alfred L. Werker	Maria Montez, Rod Cameron, Gilbert Roland	Adventure	Universal
Possessed	Curtis Bernhardt	Joan Crawford, Van Heflin, Raymond Massey	Film noir	Warner Bros.
The Prairie	Frank Wisbar	Lenore Aubert, Alan Baxter, Fred Coby	Western	Lippert
Prairie Express	Lambert Hillyer	Johnny Mack Brown, Raymond Hatton, Virginia Belmont	Western	Monogram
Prairie Raiders	Derwin Abrahams	Charles Starrett, Nancy Saunders, Smiley Burnette	Western	Columbia
The Pretender	W. Lee Wilder	Albert Dekker, Catherine Craig, Charles Drake	Film noir	Republic
The Private Affairs of Bel Ami	Albert Lewin	George Sanders, Angela Lansbury, Ann Dvorak	Drama	United Artists
Pursued	Raoul Walsh	Robert Mitchum, Teresa Wright, Judith Anderson	Western	Warner Bros.
Queen of the Amazons	Edward Finney	Robert Lowery, Patricia Morison, John Miljan	Adventure	Lippert

== R-S ==
Title	Director	Cast	Genre	Notes
Raiders of the South	Lambert Hillyer	Johnny Mack Brown, Evelyn Brent, Raymond Hatton	Western	Monogram
Railroaded!	Anthony Mann	John Ireland, Sheila Ryan, Hugh Beaumont	Film noir	Eagle-Lion
Rainbow Over the Rockies	Oliver Drake	Jimmy Wakely, Dennis Moore, Jack Baxley	Western	Monogram
Ramrod	André de Toth	Joel McCrea, Veronica Lake, Donald Crisp	Western	United Artists
Range Beyond the Blue	Ray Taylor	Eddie Dean, Roscoe Ates, Helen Mowery	Western	PRC
The Red House	Delmer Daves	Edward G. Robinson, Lon McCallister, Judith Anderson	Horror	United Artists
The Red Stallion	Lesley Selander	Robert Paige, Noreen Nash, Ted Donaldson	Drama	Eagle-Lion
Repeat Performance	Alfred L. Werker	Louis Hayward, Joan Leslie, Virginia Field	Film noir	Eagle-Lion
Return of the Lash	Ray Taylor	Lash LaRue, Al St. John, George Chesebro	Western	PRC
The Return of Rin Tin Tin	Max Nosseck	Donald Woods, Claudia Drake, Robert Blake	Drama	Eagle-Lion
Ride the Pink Horse	Robert Montgomery	Robert Montgomery, Wanda Hendrix, Thomas Gomez	Film noir	Universal
Riders of the Lone Star	Derwin Abrahams	Charles Starrett, Virginia Hunter, Smiley Burnette	Western	Columbia
Ridin' Down the Trail	Howard Bretherton	Jimmy Wakely, Douglas Fowley, Dub Taylor	Western	Monogram
Riding the California Trail	William Nigh	Gilbert Roland, Teala Loring, Martin Garralaga	Western	Monogram
Riffraff	Ted Tetzlaff	Pat O'Brien, Walter Slezak, Anne Jeffreys	Film noir	RKO
Road to the Big House	Walter Colmes	John Shelton, Ann Doran, Guinn "Big Boy" Williams	Crime	Lippert
Road to Rio	Norman Z. McLeod	Bob Hope, Bing Crosby, Dorothy Lamour	Comedy	Paramount; 5th of series
Robin Hood of Monterey	Christy Cabanne	Gilbert Roland, Evelyn Brent, Jack La Rue	Adventure	Monogram
Robin Hood of Texas	Lesley Selander	Gene Autry, Lynne Roberts, Adele Mara	Western	Republic
The Romance of Rosy Ridge	Roy Rowland	Van Johnson, Thomas Mitchell, Janet Leigh	Western	MGM
Roses Are Red	James Tinling	Peggy Knudsen, Don Castle, Patricia Knight	Crime	20th Century Fox
Rose of Santa Rosa	Ray Nazarro	Patricia Barry, Eduardo Noriega, Eduardo Ciannelli	Comedy	Columbia
Rustlers of Devil's Canyon	R. G. Springsteen	Allan Lane, Peggy Stewart, Martha Wentworth	Western	Republic
Saddle Pals	Lesley Selander	Gene Autry, Lynne Roberts, Sterling Holloway	Western	Republic
Sarge Goes to College	Will Jason	Freddie Stewart, June Preisser, Frankie Darro	Comedy	Monogram
Scared to Death	Christy Cabanne	Bela Lugosi, George Zucco, Molly Lamont	Horror	Lippert
The Sea of Grass	Elia Kazan	Spencer Tracy, Katharine Hepburn, Melvyn Douglas	Western	MGM
Second Chance	James Tinling	Kent Taylor, Louise Currie, Dennis Hoey	Crime	20th Century Fox
Secret Beyond the Door	Fritz Lang	Joan Bennett, Michael Redgrave, Anne Revere	Horror	Universal
The Secret Life of Walter Mitty	Norman Z. McLeod	Danny Kaye, Virginia Mayo, Boris Karloff	Comedy	RKO; remade in 2013
The Senator Was Indiscreet	George S. Kaufman	William Powell, Ella Raines, Arleen Whelan	Comedy	Universal
Seven Keys to Baldpate	Lew Landers	Phillip Terry, Jacqueline White, Eduardo Ciannelli	Mystery	RKO
Seven Were Saved	William H. Pine	Richard Denning, Catherine Craig, Russell Hayden	Drama	Paramount
Shadow Valley	Ray Taylor	Eddie Dean, Jennifer Holt, Roscoe Ates	Western	PRC
The Shocking Miss Pilgrim	George Seaton	Betty Grable, Dick Haymes, Anne Revere	Musical	20th Century Fox
Shoot to Kill	William Berke	Robert Kent, Luana Walters, Edmund MacDonald	Crime	Lippert; remade in 1988
The Sin of Harold Diddlebock	Preston Sturges	Harold Lloyd, Rudy Vallee, Raymond Walburn	Comedy	United Artists
Sinbad the Sailor	Richard Wallace	Douglas Fairbanks Jr., Maureen O'Hara, Walter Slezak	Fantasy	RKO
Singapore	John Brahm	Fred MacMurray, Ava Gardner, Roland Culver	Film noir	Universal
Six-Gun Serenade	Ford Beebe	Jimmy Wakely, Kay Morley, Jimmy Martin	Western	Monogram
Slave Girl	Charles Lamont	Yvonne De Carlo, George Brent, Broderick Crawford	Adventure	Universal
Smash-Up, the Story of a Woman	Stuart Heisler	Susan Hayward, Lee Bowman, Eddie Albert	Film noir	Universal; 2 Oscar nominations
Smoky River Serenade	Derwin Abrahams	Ruth Terry, Paul Campbell, Virginia Hunter	Western	Columbia
Something in the Wind	Irving Pichel	Deanna Durbin, Donald O'Connor, Charles Winninger	Musical	Universal
The Son of Rusty	Lew Landers	Tom Powers, Ann Doran, Stephen Dunne	Drama	Columbia
Song of Love	Clarence Brown	Katharine Hepburn, Paul Henreid, Robert Walker	Drama	MGM. Biopic of Robert Schumann
Song of Scheherazade	Walter Reisch	Yvonne De Carlo, Jean-Pierre Aumont, Eve Arden	Fantasy	Universal
Song of the Wasteland	Thomas Carr	Jimmy Wakely, Marshall Reed, Ted Adams	Western	Monogram
Song of the Thin Man	Edward Buzzell	William Powell, Myrna Loy, Patricia Morison	Mystery	MGM. Last of Thin Man series
South of the Chisholm Trail	Derwin Abrahams	Charles Starrett, Nancy Saunders, Smiley Burnette	Western	Columbia
The Spirit of West Point	Ralph Murphy	Felix Blanchard, Glenn Davis, Anne Nagel	Drama	Film Classics
Spoilers of the North	Richard Sale	Paul Kelly, Lorna Gray, Evelyn Ankers	Action	Republic
Sport of Kings	Robert Gordon	Paul Campbell, Gloria Henry, Harry Davenport	Sports	Columbia
Springtime in the Sierras	William Witney	Roy Rogers, Jane Frazee, Andy Devine	Western	Republic
Stage to Mesa City	Ray Taylor	Lash LaRue, Jennifer Holt, George Chesebro	Western	PRC
Stallion Road	James V. Kern	Ronald Reagan, Alexis Smith, Zachary Scott	Drama	Warner Bros.
Stepchild	James Flood	Brenda Joyce, Donald Woods, Vivian Austin	Drama	PRC
Stork Bites Man	Cy Endfield	Jackie Cooper, Meg Randall, Emory Parnell	Comedy	United Artists
The Stranger from Ponca City	Derwin Abrahams	Charles Starrett, Virginia Hunter, Smiley Burnette	Western	Columbia
Suddenly, It's Spring	Mitchell Leisen	Paulette Goddard, Fred MacMurray, Macdonald Carey	Comedy	Paramount
Sweet Genevieve	Arthur Dreifuss	Jean Porter, Jimmy Lydon, Lucien Littlefield	Comedy	Columbia
Swing the Western Way	Derwin Abrahams	Jack Leonard, Thurston Hall, Regina Wallace	Western	Columbia

== T-U ==
Title	Director	Cast	Genre	Notes
Tarzan and the Huntress	Kurt Neumann	Johnny Weissmuller, Brenda Joyce, Patricia Morison	Adventure	RKO
T-Men	Anthony Mann	Dennis O'Keefe, Wallace Ford, Mary Meade	Film noir	Eagle-Lion
That Hagen Girl	Peter Godfrey	Ronald Reagan, Shirley Temple, Rory Calhoun	Drama	Warner Bros.
That's My Gal	George Blair	Lynne Roberts, Don Barry, Frank Jenks	Comedy	Republic
That's My Man	Frank Borzage	Don Ameche, Catherine McLeod, Roscoe Karns	Drama	Republic
That Way with Women	Frederick de Cordova	Dane Clark, Martha Vickers, Sydney Greenstreet	Comedy	Warner Bros.
They Won't Believe Me	Irving Pichel	Susan Hayward, Robert Young, Jane Greer	Drama	RKO
The Thirteenth Hour	William Clemens	Richard Dix, Karen Morley, John Kellogg	Mystery	Columbia
This Time for Keeps	Richard Thorpe	Esther Williams, Johnnie Johnston, Jimmy Durante	Musical	MGM
Three on a Ticket	Sam Newfield	Hugh Beaumont, Cheryl Walker, Ralph Dunn	Mystery	PRC
Thunder in the Valley	Louis King	Lon McCallister, Peggy Ann Garner, Edmund Gwenn	Drama	20th Century Fox
Thunder Mountain	Lew Landers	Tim Holt, Martha Hyer, Richard Martin	Western	RKO
Time Out of Mind	Robert Siodmak	Phyllis Calvert, Robert Hutton, Ella Raines	Drama	Universal
Too Many Winners	William Beaudine	Hugh Beaumont, Trudy Marshall, Claire Carleton	Mystery	PRC
Trail of the Mounties	Howard Bretherton	Russell Hayden, Jennifer Holt, Emmett Lynn	Western	Lippert
Trail Street	Ray Enright	Randolph Scott, Robert Ryan, Anne Jeffreys	Western	RKO
Trail to San Antone	John English	Gene Autry, Peggy Stewart, Sterling Holloway	Western	Monogram
Trailing Danger	Lambert Hillyer	Johnny Mack Brown, Raymond Hatton, Marshall Reed	Western	Monogram
The Trespasser	George Blair	Dale Evans, Warren Douglas, Adele Mara	Action	Republic
The Trouble with Women	Sidney Lanfield	Ray Milland, Teresa Wright, Brian Donlevy	Comedy	Paramount
Twilight on the Rio Grande	Frank McDonald	Gene Autry, Adele Mara, Sterling Holloway	Western	Republic
Two Blondes and a Redhead	Arthur Dreifuss	Jean Porter, Jimmy Lloyd, June Preisser	Comedy	Columbia
The Two Mrs. Carrolls	Peter Godfrey	Barbara Stanwyck, Humphrey Bogart, Alexis Smith	Drama	Warner Bros.
Tycoon	Richard Wallace	John Wayne, Laraine Day, Cedric Hardwicke	Drama	RKO
Unconquered	Cecil B. DeMille	Gary Cooper, Paulette Goddard, Howard Da Silva	Adventure	Paramount
Under Colorado Skies	R. G. Springsteen	Monte Hale, Lorna Gray, Paul Hurst	Western	Republic
Under the Tonto Rim	Lew Landers	Tim Holt, Nan Leslie, Richard Martin	Western	RKO
Undercover Maisie	Harry Beaumont	Ann Sothern, Barry Nelson, Leon Ames	Comedy	MGM. 10th of series
Unexpected Guest	George Archainbaud	William Boyd, Andy Clyde, Una O'Connor	Western	United Artists
The Unfaithful	Vincent Sherman	Ann Sheridan, Lew Ayres, Zachary Scott	Film noir	Warner Bros.
The Unfinished Dance	Henry Koster	Cyd Charisse, Margaret O'Brien, Danny Thomas	Musical	MGM
The Unsuspected	Michael Curtiz	Claude Rains, Joan Caulfield, Audrey Totter	Film noir	Warner Bros.
Untamed Fury	Ewing Scott	Steve Pendleton, Mikel Conrad, Jack Rutherford	Adventure	PRC

== V-Z ==
Title	Director	Cast	Genre	Notes
Vacation Days	Arthur Dreifuss	Freddie Stewart, June Preisser, Frankie Darro	Comedy	Monogram
Valley of Fear	Lambert Hillyer	Johnny Mack Brown, Raymond Hatton, Christine McIntyre	Western	Monogram
Variety Girl	George Marshall	Mary Hatcher, Olga San Juan, Glenn Tryon	Musical	Paramount. Various cameos.
The Velvet Touch	Jack Gage	Rosalind Russell, Claire Trevor, Sydney Greenstreet	Film noir	RKO
Vigilantes of Boomtown	R. G. Springsteen	Allan Lane, Peggy Stewart, Martha Wentworth	Western	Republic
The Vigilantes Return	Ray Taylor	Jon Hall, Margaret Lindsay, Andy Devine	Western	Universal
Violence	Jack Bernhard	Nancy Coleman, Michael O'Shea, Sheldon Leonard	Crime	Monogram
The Voice of the Turtle	Irving Rapper	Ronald Reagan, Eleanor Parker, Eve Arden	Comedy	Warner Bros.
The Web	Michael Gordon	Ella Raines, Vincent Price, Edmond O'Brien	Film noir	Universal; Became TV series
Web of Danger	Philip Ford	Adele Mara, Bill Kennedy, Damian O'Flynn	Crime	Republic
Welcome Stranger	Elliott Nugent	Bing Crosby, Joan Caulfield, Wanda Hendrix	Drama	Paramount
West of Dodge City	Ray Nazarro	Charles Starrett, Nancy Saunders, Smiley Burnette	Western	Columbia
West to Glory	Ray Taylor	Eddie Dean, Roscoe Ates, Gregg Barton	Western	PRC
When a Girl's Beautiful	Frank McDonald	Adele Jergens, Marc Platt, Patricia Barry	Comedy	Columbia
Where There's Life	Sidney Lanfield	Bob Hope, Signe Hasso, William Bendix, George Coulouris	Comedy	Paramount
Whispering City	Fyodor Ostep	Paul Lukas, Helmut Dantine	Drama	Eagle-Lion
Wild Country	Ray Taylor	Eddie Dean, Roscoe Ates, Douglas Fowley	Western	PRC
The Wild Frontier	Philip Ford	Allan Lane, Jack Holt, Eddy Waller	Western	Republic
Wild Harvest	Tay Garnett	Alan Ladd, Dorothy Lamour, Robert Preston	Drama	Paramount
Wild Horse Mesa	Wallace Grissell	Tim Holt, Nan Leslie, Jason Robards Sr.	Western	RKO
The Wistful Widow of Wagon Gap	Charles Barton	Bud Abbott, Lou Costello, Marjorie Main	Comedy	Universal
The Woman on the Beach	Jean Renoir	Joan Bennett, Robert Ryan, Charles Bickford	Film noir	RKO
Wyoming	Joseph Kane	Wild Bill Elliott, Vera Ralston, John Carroll	Western	Republic
Yankee Fakir	W. Lee Wilder	Douglas Fowley, Joan Woodbury, Clem Bevans	Mystery	Republic

== Documentary ==
Title	Director	Cast	Genre	Notes
Thunderbolt	John Sturges, William Wyler	James Stewart	War documentary	Monogram

== Other ==
Title	Director	Cast	Genre	Notes
Dreams That Money Can Buy	Hans Richter	Jack Bittner	Experimental	Independent

== Serials ==
Title	Director	Cast	Genre	Notes
The Black Widow		Bruce Edwards	Serial	
Brick Bradford			Serial	
Jesse James Rides Again	F. Brannon, T. Carr	Clayton Moore	Western	Serial
Son of Zorro		George Turner, Peggy Stewart	Serial	
The Vigilante	Wallace Fox	Ralph Byrd	Action	Serial

== Shorts ==
Title	Director	Cast	Genre	Notes
Cat Fishin'			Animated	
Don't Be a Sucker			Propaganda	
Dr. Jekyll and Mr. Mouse		Tom and Jerry	Animated	
Easter Yeggs		Bugs Bunny	Animated	
Fireworks	Kenneth Anger		Experimental	
Half-Wits Holiday	Jules White	The Three Stooges	Comedy	
Hold That Lion!	Jules White	The Three Stooges	Comedy Short	
The Invisible Mouse	Hanna Barbera		Animated	
King-Size Canary			Animation	
Motion Painting No. 1			Animation	
A Mouse in the House		Tom and Jerry	Animated	
Part Time Pal			Animation	
A Pest in the House			Animation	
Salt Water Tabby		Tom and Jerry	Animated	
Scent-imental Over You			Animated	
Sing a Song of Six Pants	Jules White	The Three Stooges	Comedy short	
Slick Hare		Bugs Bunny	Animated	
Tubby the Tuba	George Pal		Animated	
Tweetie Pie			Animated	Warner Bros.

== See also ==
- 1947 in the United States
