= Streets of Ghost Town =

1950 film by Ray Nazarro

- Theatrical release poster
- Directed by: Ray Nazarro
- Written by: Barry Shipman
- Produced by: Colbert Clark
- Starring: Charles Starrett; George Chesebro; Mary Ellen Kay; Stanley Andrews; Frank Fenton; Don Reynolds; Ozie Waters; Smiley Burnette
- Cinematography: Fayte M. Browne
- Edited by: Paul Borofsky
- Production company: Columbia Pictures
- Distributed by: Columbia Pictures
- Release date: August 3, 1950
- Running time: 54 minutes
- Country: United States
- Language: English

Streets of Ghost Town is a 1950 American Western film directed by Ray Nazarro and written by Barry Shipman. The film stars Charles Starrett, Smiley Burnette, George Chesebro, Mary Ellen Kay, Stanley Andrews, Frank Fenton, Don Reynolds, and Ozie Waters. The film was released on August 3, 1950, by Columbia Pictures. This was the forty-eighth of 65 films in the Durango Kid series.

== Plot ==
Steve, Smiley and the Sheriff come to a ghost town to search for Bill Donner's gold. As they are menaced by persons unknown, Steve recounts the story of Donner and the deadly double cross. They are joined by Bill's daughter who is searching for her little brother who has come to claim the gold for himself.

== Cast ==
- Charles Starrett as Steve Woods / The Durango Kid
- Smiley Burnette as Smiley Burnette
- George Chesebro as Bill Donner
- Mary Ellen Kay as Doris Donner
- Stanley Andrews as Sheriff Dodge
- Frank Fenton as Bart Selby
- Don Reynolds as Tommy Donner
- Ozie Waters as Ozie

== Production ==
This picture was made during an economy measure to make Columbia's program westerns cheaper. Each all-new Durango Kid adventure would alternate with a "cheater"—a film that would insert scenes from older Durango Kid pictures so fewer new scenes would be staged and filmed. Screenwriter Barry Shipman was especially imaginative with Streets of Ghost Town. He took old action scenes from the 1946 Starrett westerns Gunning for Vengeance and Landrush, and by setting the new sequences in a deserted town, Shipman saw to it that many scenes involved only three actors—Starrett, Burnette, and Stanley Andrews as the sheriff—and didn't require new sets, props, costumes, supporting actors, or even extras, reducing the production budget considerably.
