= Whirlwind Raiders =

1948 film by Vernon Keays

- Theatrical release poster
- Directed by: Vernon Keays
- Screenplay by: Norman S. Hall
- Produced by: Colbert Clark
- Starring: Charles Starrett; Don Reynolds; Nancy Saunders; Fred F. Sears; Doye O'Dell; Smiley Burnette
- Cinematography: M.A. Andersen
- Edited by: Paul Borofsky
- Production company: Columbia Pictures
- Distributed by: Columbia Pictures
- Release date: May 13, 1948
- Running time: 54 minutes
- Country: United States
- Language: English

Whirlwind Raiders is a 1948 American Western film directed by Vernon Keays and written by Norman S. Hall. The film stars Charles Starrett, Don Reynolds, Nancy Saunders, Fred F. Sears, Doye O'Dell and Smiley Burnette. The film was released on May 13, 1948, by Columbia Pictures. This was the thirty-first of 65 films in the Durango Kid series.

== Cast ==
- Charles Starrett as Steve Lanning / The Durango Kid
- Don Reynolds as Tommy Ross
- Nancy Saunders as Claire Ross
- Fred F. Sears as Tracy Beaumont
- Doye O'Dell as Doye O'Dell
- Smiley Burnette as Smiley Burnette
- Jack Ingram as Buff Tyson
- Philip Morris as Homer Ross
- Patrick Hurst as Bill Webster
- Ed Parker as Red Jordan
- Lynn Farr as Slim
- Maudie Prickett as Mrs. Wallace
- Frank LaRue as Wilson
- Russell Meeker as Charlie
