= Frontier Gunlaw =

1946 film by Derwin Abrahams

- Theatrical release poster
- Directed by: Derwin Abrahams
- Screenplay by: Bennett Cohen
- Story by: Victor McLeod
- Produced by: Colbert Clark
- Starring: Charles Starrett; Tex Harding; Dub Taylor; Jean Stevens; Weldon Heyburn; Jack Rockwell
- Cinematography: Glen Gano
- Edited by: Aaron Stell
- Production company: Columbia Pictures
- Distributed by: Columbia Pictures
- Release date: January 31, 1946
- Running time: 60 minutes
- Country: United States
- Language: English

Frontier Gunlaw is a 1946 American Western film directed by Derwin Abrahams and written by Bennett Cohen. The film stars Charles Starrett, Tex Harding, Dub Taylor, Jean Stevens, Weldon Heyburn and Jack Rockwell. The film was released on January 31, 1946, by Columbia Pictures. This was the ninth of 65 films in the Durango Kid series.

== Cast ==
- Charles Starrett as Jim Stewart / The Durango Kid
- Tex Harding as Tex Harding
- Dub Taylor as Cannonball
- Jean Stevens as Kitty Harding
- Weldon Heyburn as Matt Edwards
- Jack Rockwell as Hank Watson
- Frank LaRue as Sheriff Kincaid
- John Elliott as Pop Evans
- Bob Kortman as Mace
- Stanley Price as Sam
- Al Trace as Al Trace
- Jack Guthrie as Jack Guthrie
