= Snake River Desperadoes =

1951 film by Fred F. Sears

- Theatrical release poster
- Directed by: Fred F. Sears
- Written by: Barry Shipman
- Produced by: Colbert Clark
- Starring: Charles Starrett; Don Reynolds; Tommy Ivo; Monte Blue; Smiley Burnette
- Cinematography: Fayte M. Browne
- Edited by: Paul Borofsky
- Production company: Columbia Pictures
- Distributed by: Columbia Pictures
- Release date: May 30, 1951
- Running time: 54 minutes
- Country: United States
- Language: English

Snake River Desperadoes is a 1951 American Western film directed by Fred F. Sears, written by Barry Shipman and starring Charles Starrett, Don Reynolds, Tommy Ivo, Monte Blue and Smiley Burnette. The film, the 55th of 65 films in the Durango Kid series, was released on May 30, 1951 by Columbia Pictures.

== Cast ==
- Charles Starrett as Steve Reynolds / The Durango Kid
- Don Reynolds as Little Hawk
- Tommy Ivo as Billy Haverly
- Monte Blue as Jim Haverly
- Smiley Burnette as Smiley Burnette
