= Bandits of El Dorado =

1949 film by Ray Nazarro

- Theatrical release poster
- Directed by: Ray Nazarro
- Screenplay by: Barry Shipman
- Produced by: Colbert Clark
- Starring: Charles Starrett; George J. Lewis; Fred F. Sears; John Dehner; Clayton Moore; Smiley Burnette
- Cinematography: Fayte M. Browne
- Edited by: Paul Borofsky
- Production company: Columbia Pictures
- Distributed by: Columbia Pictures
- Release date: October 20, 1949
- Running time: 58 minutes
- Country: United States
- Language: English

Bandits of El Dorado is a 1949 American Western film directed by Ray Nazarro and written by Barry Shipman. The film stars Charles Starrett, George J. Lewis, Fred F. Sears, John Dehner, Clayton Moore and Smiley Burnette. The film was released on October 20, 1949, by Columbia Pictures. This was the forty-first of 65 films in the Durango Kid series.

== Cast ==
- Charles Starrett as Steve Carson / The Durango Kid
- George J. Lewis as José Vargas
- Fred F. Sears as Captain Richard Henley
- John Dehner as Charles Bruton
- Clayton Moore as B. F. Morgan
- Smiley Burnette as Smiley Burnette
