= Texas Panhandle (film) =

1945 film by Ray Nazarro

- Theatrical release poster
- Directed by: Ray Nazarro
- Screenplay by: Ed Earl Repp
- Produced by: Colbert Clark
- Starring: Charles Starrett; Tex Harding; Dub Taylor; Nanette Parks; Carolina Cotton; Spade Cooley
- Cinematography: George F. Kelley
- Edited by: Paul Borofsky
- Production company: Columbia Pictures
- Distributed by: Columbia Pictures
- Release date: December 20, 1945
- Running time: 55 minutes
- Country: United States
- Language: English

Texas Panhandle is a 1945 American Western film directed by Ray Nazarro and written by Ed Earl Repp. The film stars Charles Starrett, Tex Harding, Dub Taylor, Nanette Parks, Carolina Cotton and Spade Cooley. The film was released on December 20, 1945, by Columbia Pictures. This was the eighth of 65 films in the Durango Kid series.

== Cast ==
- Charles Starrett as Steve Buckner / The Durango Kid
- Tex Harding as Tex Harding
- Dub Taylor as Cannonball Taylor
- Nanette Parks as Ann Williams
- Carolina Cotton as Carolina
- Spade Cooley as Spade
- Forrest Taylor as Ace Galatin
- George Chesebro as Slash
- Ted Mapes as Trig
- Edward Howard as Dinero
- Jody Gilbert as Millicent
- William Gould as James Harrington
- Jack Kirk as Bristow
- Budd Buster as Martin
- Hugh Hooker as Shorty
