= Quick on the Trigger =

1948 film by Ray Nazarro

- Theatrical release poster
- Directed by: Ray Nazarro
- Screenplay by: Elmer Clifton
- Produced by: Colbert Clark
- Starring: Charles Starrett; Smiley Burnette; Lyle Talbot; Helen Parrish; George Eldredge; Ted Adams
- Cinematography: Rex Wimpy
- Edited by: Paul Borofsky
- Production company: Columbia Pictures
- Distributed by: Columbia Pictures
- Release date: December 2, 1948
- Running time: 54 minutes
- Country: United States
- Language: English

Quick on the Trigger is a 1948 American Western film directed by Ray Nazarro and written by Elmer Clifton. The film stars Charles Starrett, Smiley Burnette, Lyle Talbot, Helen Parrish, George Eldredge and Ted Adams. The film was released on December 2, 1948, by Columbia Pictures. This was the thirty-fifth of 65 films in the Durango Kid series.

== Cast ==
- Charles Starrett as Steve Warren / The Durango Kid
- Smiley Burnette as Smiley
- Lyle Talbot as Garvey Yager
- Helen Parrish as Nora Reed
- George Eldredge as Alfred Murdock
- Ted Adams as Martin Oaks
- Alan Bridge as Judge Kormac
- Russell Arms as Fred Reed
- M.H. Richman as Band Member
- Freddie Daniel as Band Member
- Eddie Wallace as Band Member
- J.D. Sumner as Band Member
