= Frontier Outpost =

1950 film by Ray Nazarro

- Directed by: Ray Nazarro
- Written by: Barry Shipman
- Produced by: Colbert Clark
- Starring: Charles Starrett; Lois Hall; Steve Darrell
- Cinematography: Fayte M. Browne
- Edited by: Paul Borofsky
- Music by: Mischa Bakaleinikoff
- Production company: Columbia Pictures
- Distributed by: Columbia Pictures
- Release date: December 29, 1950
- Running time: 55 minutes
- Country: United States
- Language: English

Frontier Outpost is a 1950 American Western film directed by Ray Nazarro and starring Charles Starrett, Lois Hall and Steve Darrell. The film is the 44th of 65 films in the Durango Kid series.

== Cast ==
- Charles Starrett as Steve Lawton / Durango Kid
- Lois Hall as Alice Tanner
- Steve Darrell as Forsythe
- Fred F. Sears as Major Copeland
- Robert J. Wilke as Krag Benson
- Hank Penny as Guitar Player
- Slim Duncan as Fiddle Player
- Smiley Burnette as Smiley Burnette

== Bibliography ==
- Blottner, Gene. Columbia Pictures Movie Series, 1926-1955: The Harry Cohn Years. McFarland, 2011.
