= Trail to Laredo =

1948 film by Ray Nazarro

- Theatrical release poster
- Directed by: Ray Nazarro
- Screenplay by: Barry Shipman
- Produced by: Colbert Clark
- Starring: Charles Starrett; Jim Bannon; Virginia Maxey; Tommy Ivo; Hugh Prosser; Smiley Burnette
- Cinematography: Henry Freulich
- Edited by: Paul Borofsky
- Production company: Columbia Pictures
- Distributed by: Columbia Pictures
- Release date: August 12, 1948
- Running time: 54 minutes
- Country: United States
- Language: English

Trail to Laredo is a 1948 American Western film directed by Ray Nazarro and written by Barry Shipman. The film stars Charles Starrett, Jim Bannon, Virginia Maxey, Tommy Ivo, Hugh Prosser and Smiley Burnette. The film was released on August 12, 1948, by Columbia Pictures. This was the thirty-third of 65 films in the Durango Kid series.

== Cast ==
- Charles Starrett as Steve Ellison / The Durango Kid
- Jim Bannon as Dan Parks
- Virginia Maxey as Classy
- Tommy Ivo as Ronnie Parks
- Hugh Prosser as Fenton
- Smiley Burnette as Smiley Burnette
- George Chesebro as Walt Morgan
- John Merton as Sheriff Kenney
- John Cason as Blaze
- Robert J. Wilke as Duke
- Ted Mapes as Chuck
