= The Hawk of Wild River =

1952 film by Fred F. Sears

- Theatrical release poster
- Directed by: Fred F. Sears
- Written by: Howard J. Green
- Produced by: Colbert Clark
- Starring: Charles Starrett; Smiley Burnette; Jock Mahoney; Clayton Moore; Eddie Parker; Jim Diehl
- Cinematography: Fayte M. Browne
- Edited by: Paul Borofsky
- Production company: Columbia Pictures
- Distributed by: Columbia Pictures
- Release date: January 26, 1952
- Running time: 53 minutes
- Country: United States
- Language: English

The Hawk of Wild River is a 1952 American Western film directed by Fred F. Sears, written by Howard J. Green and starring Charles Starrett, Smiley Burnette and Jock Mahoney. It is the 61st of 65 films in the Durango Kid series. The film opened on January 26, 1952.

== Plot ==
Undercover ranger Steve Martin comes to town to nab a half-Indian outlaw known as the Hawk. Martin is able to infiltrate the Hawk's gang. Traveling photographer Smiley Burnette is hypnotized by a dubious dentist into believing that he is an Indian chief, which leads to a shootout against the Hawk with a longbow.

== Cast ==
- Charles Starrett as Steve Martin / The Durango Kid
- Smiley Burnette as Smiley Burnette
- Jock Mahoney as Jack Mahoney
- Clayton Moore as The Hawk
- Eddie Parker as Skeeter
- Jim Diehl as Al Travis
- Lane Chandler as George
- Syd Saylor as Yank-Em-Out Kennedy
- John Cason as Duke
- LeRoy Johnson as Smoky
- Jack Carry as Pete
- Sam Flint as Clark Mahoney
- Raider as Raider
- Bullet as Bullet

== Production ==
Production began on July 30, 1951 and was completed several weeks later.
