= Riders of the Lone Star =

1947 film by Derwin Abrahams

- Theatrical release poster
- Directed by: Derwin Abrahams
- Screenplay by: Barry Shipman
- Produced by: Colbert Clark
- Starring: Charles Starrett; Virginia Hunter; Curly Williams; Smiley Burnette
- Cinematography: George F. Kelley
- Edited by: Paul Borofsky
- Production company: Columbia Pictures
- Distributed by: Columbia Pictures
- Release date: August 14, 1947
- Running time: 55 minutes
- Country: United States
- Language: English

Riders of the Lone Star is a 1947 American Western film directed by Derwin Abrahams and written by Barry Shipman. The film stars Charles Starrett, Virginia Hunter, Curly Williams and Smiley Burnette. The film was released on August 14, 1947, by Columbia Pictures. This was the twenty-fifth of 65 films in the Durango Kid series.

== Cast ==
- Charles Starrett as Steve Mason / The Durango Kid
- Virginia Hunter as Doris McCormick
- Curly Williams as Fiddle Player Pee Wee
- Smiley Burnette as Smiley Burnette
- Steve Darrell as Murdock
- Edmund Cobb as Drake
- Mark Dennis as Mike Morton
- Lane Bradford as Rank
- Ted Mapes as Slade
- George Chesebro as Faro
- Peter Perkins as Brock
- Ed Parker as Sheriff Banning
- Nolan Leary as Doc Jones
