= Desert Vigilante =

1949 film by Fred F. Sears

- Theatrical release poster
- Directed by: Fred F. Sears
- Written by: Earle Snell
- Produced by: Colbert Clark
- Starring: Charles Starrett; Peggy Stewart; Tris Coffin; Mary Newton; George Chesebro; Smiley Burnette
- Cinematography: Rex Wimpy
- Edited by: Paul Borofsky
- Production company: Columbia Pictures
- Distributed by: Columbia Pictures
- Release date: April 9, 1949
- Running time: 56 minutes
- Country: United States
- Language: English

Desert Vigilante is a 1949 American Western film directed by Fred F. Sears and written by Earle Snell. The film stars Charles Starrett, Peggy Stewart, Tris Coffin, Mary Newton, George Chesebro and Smiley Burnette. The film was released on April 9, 1949, by Columbia Pictures. This was the forty-second of 65 films in the Durango Kid series.

== Cast ==
- Charles Starrett as Steve Wood / The Durango Kid
- Peggy Stewart as Betty Long
- Tris Coffin as Thomas Hadley
- Mary Newton as Angel
- George Chesebro as Bill Martin
- Smiley Burnette as Smiley Burnette
- Paul Campbell as Bob Gill
- Tex Harding as Jim Gill
- Jack Ingram as Sergeant
- I. Stanford Jolley as Heavy
