= The Return of the Durango Kid =

1945 film by Derwin Abrahams

- Theatrical release poster
- Directed by: Derwin Abrahams
- Screenplay by: J. Benton Cheney
- Produced by: Colbert Clark
- Starring: Charles Starrett; Tex Harding; Jean Stevens; John Calvert
- Cinematography: Glen Gano
- Edited by: Aaron Stell
- Production company: Columbia Pictures
- Distributed by: Columbia Pictures
- Release date: April 19, 1945
- Running time: 58 minutes
- Country: United States
- Language: English

The Return of the Durango Kid is a 1945 American Western film directed by Derwin Abrahams and written by J. Benton Cheney. The film stars Charles Starrett, Tex Harding, Jean Stevens and John Calvert. The film was released on April 19, 1945, by Columbia Pictures. This was the second of 65 films in the Durango Kid series.

== Cast ==
- Charles Starrett as Bill Blayden / The Durango Kid
- Tex Harding as Jim
- Jean Stevens as Paradise Flo
- John Calvert as Leland Kirby
- Betty Roadman as Buckskin Liz
- Hal Price as Tom Wagner
- Dick Botiller as Sheriff Potter
- Britt Wood as Curly
- Ray Bennett as Cherokee
- Paul Conrad as Ringo
- Steve Clark as Steve Manning
- Carl Sepulveda as Tom Richards
- Elmo Lincoln as Luke Blake
