= Two-Fisted Stranger =

1946 film by Ray Nazarro

- Theatrical release poster
- Directed by: Ray Nazarro
- Screenplay by: Robert Lee Johnson
- Story by: Peter Whitehead; Robert Lee Johnson
- Produced by: Colbert Clark
- Starring: Charles Starrett; Doris Houck; Zeke Clements; Smiley Burnette
- Cinematography: Vincent J. Farrar
- Edited by: Paul Borofsky
- Production company: Columbia Pictures
- Distributed by: Columbia Pictures
- Release date: May 30, 1946
- Running time: 53 minutes
- Country: United States
- Language: English

Two-Fisted Stranger is a 1946 American Western film directed by Ray Nazarro and written by Robert Lee Johnson. The film stars Charles Starrett, Doris Houck, Zeke Clements and Smiley Burnette. The film was released on May 30, 1946, by Columbia Pictures. This was the thirteenth of 65 films in the Durango Kid series.

== Cast ==
- Charles Starrett as Steve Gordon / The Durango Kid
- Doris Houck as Jennifer Martin
- Zeke Clements as Zeke Clements
- Smiley Burnette as Smiley Burnette
- Charles Murray Jr. as Ted Randolph
- Lane Chandler as Brady
- Ted Mapes as Duke Benson
- George Chesebro as Doyle
- Jack Rockwell as Sheriff Condon
- Herman Hack as Outlaw
- Davison Clark as J. P. Martin
- Maudie Prickett as Widow Simpson
