= Lawless Empire =

1945 film by Vernon Keays

- Theatrical release poster
- Directed by: Vernon Keays
- Screenplay by: Bennett Cohen
- Story by: Elizabeth Beecher
- Produced by: Colbert Clark
- Starring: Charles Starrett; Tex Harding; Dub Taylor; Mildred Law; Bob Wills
- Cinematography: George Meehan
- Edited by: Paul Borofsky
- Production company: Columbia Pictures
- Distributed by: Columbia Pictures
- Release date: November 15, 1945
- Running time: 58 minutes
- Country: United States
- Language: English

Lawless Empire is a 1945 American Western film directed by Vernon Keays and written by Bennett Cohen. The film stars Charles Starrett, Tex Harding, Dub Taylor, Mildred Law and Bob Wills. The film was released on November 15, 1945, by Columbia Pictures. This was the seventh of 65 films in the Durango Kid series.

== Plot ==
In the lawless town of Dusty Gulch, the Durango Kid comes to the aid of Reverend Harding in his fight against Blaze Howard and his henchman. When Durango foils all of Blaze's plans, Blaze's boss Doc Weston realizes that it's Cannonball who's tipping off Durango. Weston then lets Cannonball overhear false information that will send Durango into a fatal trap.

== Cast ==
- Charles Starrett as Steve Ranson / The Durango Kid
- Tex Harding as Reverend Tex Harding
- Dub Taylor as Cannonball
- Mildred Law as Vicky Harding
- Bob Wills as Bob Wills
- Johnny Walsh as Marty Foster
- John Calvert as Blaze Howard
- Ethan Laidlaw as Duke Flinders
- Forrest Taylor as Doc Weston
- Jack Rockwell as Jed Stevens
- George Chesebro as Lenny
- Boyd Stockman as Skids
- Lloyd Ingraham as Mr. Murphy
- Jessie Arnold as Mrs. Murphy
- Tom Chatterton as Sam Enders
