= Fort Savage Raiders =

1951 film by Ray Nazarro

- Theatrical release poster
- Directed by: Ray Nazarro
- Screenplay by: Barry Shipman
- Produced by: Colbert Clark
- Starring: Charles Starrett; Smiley Burnette; John Dehner; Trevor Bardette; Peter M. Thompson; Fred F. Sears
- Cinematography: Henry Freulich
- Edited by: Paul Borofsky
- Production company: Columbia Pictures
- Distributed by: Columbia Pictures
- Release date: March 15, 1951
- Running time: 54 minutes
- Country: United States
- Language: English

Fort Savage Raiders is a 1951 American Western film directed by Ray Nazarro and written by Barry Shipman. Released in March 1951 by Columbia Pictures, the production stars Charles Starrett, Smiley Burnette, John Dehner, Trevor Bardette and Dusty Walker. The film is the 54th of 65 in the Durango Kid series.

== Cast ==
- Charles Starrett as Steve Drake / The Durango Kid
- Smiley Burnette as Smiley Burnette
- John Dehner as Captain Michael Craydon
- Trevor Bardette as Old Cuss
- Peter M. Thompson as Lt. James Sutter
- Fred F. Sears as Colonel Sutter
- John Cason as Gus
- Frank Griffin as Rog Beck
- Sam Flint as Colonel Markham
- Dusty Walker as Musician
