= Cyclone Fury =

1951 film by Ray Nazarro

- Directed by: Ray Nazarro
- Written by: Barry Shipman (original screenplay); Ed Earl Repp (story)
- Produced by: Colbert Clark
- Starring: Charles Starrett
- Cinematography: Henry Freulich
- Edited by: Paul Borofsky
- Color process: Black and white
- Production company: Columbia Pictures
- Distributed by: Columbia Pictures
- Release date: August 14, 1951
- Running time: 53 minutes
- Country: United States
- Language: English

Cyclone Fury is a 1951 American Western film directed by Ray Nazarro and starring Charles Starrett. It was the 57th of 65 films in the Durango Kid series.

== Plot ==
Brock Masters, the owner of thousands of wild horses, is murdered by an outlaw gang headed by Grat Hanlon, the town's most prosperous citizen. The horses are inherited by Masters's adopted son Johnny, who is an American Indian. Masters's friend Steve Reynolds -- secretly the crimefighting Durango Kid -- arranges for Johnny to sell a steady supply of horses to the United States cavalry for a handsome sum. The villainous Hanlon, who wants the lucrative contract, drives the horses to his own property so he can make the sale himself. The Durango Kid steps in to protect Johnny's interests and bring Hanlon to justice.

== Cast ==
- Charles Starrett as Steve Reynolds, The Durango Kid
- Smiley Burnette as himself
- Clayton Moore as Grat Hanlon
- Fred F. Sears as Capt. Barham
- Robert J. Wilke as Bunco, henchman (as Bob Wilke)
- Louis Lettieri as Johnny
- Robert Scott as Brock Masters
- Merle Travis and His Bronco Busters

== Production ==
By 1951 Columbia was economizing on its Durango Kid westerns. Every all-new adventure alternated with a "cheater" that filmed new material for only half the picture. The rest of the action consisted of scenes from older Durango Kid westerns. Screenwriter Barry Shipman, well versed in incorporating old scenes into new scripts, prepared a new storyline using scenes from four older features (the Smiley Burnette chase had been filmed in 1948, the Merle Travis musical numbers in 1946, the Brock Masters footage in 1947, and much of the Indian and cavalry footage in 1949).

== Reception ==
Columbia had been releasing an average of eight Charles Starrett features annually since 1935. By 1951 many of the trade publications no longer bothered to review them, reasoning that exhibitors were already satisfied customers for the well established Starrett. Cyclone Fury did receive a good review from Motion Picture Daily: "The latest in the popular Durango Kid series, Cyclone Fury, still features plenty of action to delight Durango's considerable following. Once again Charles Starrett, in the dual role of Durango and Steve Reynolds, is on hand for the heroics, with Smiley Burnette continuing to provide songs and comedy."
