= Outcast of Black Mesa =

1950 film by Ray Nazarro

- Theatrical release poster
- Directed by: Ray Nazarro
- Written by: Elmer Clifton; Barry Shipman
- Produced by: Colbert Clark
- Starring: Charles Starrett; Smiley Burnette; Martha Hyer; Richard Bailey; Stanley Andrews
- Cinematography: Fayte M. Browne
- Edited by: Paul Borofsky
- Production company: Columbia Pictures
- Distributed by: Columbia Pictures
- Release date: April 13, 1950
- Running time: 54 minutes
- Country: United States
- Language: English

Outcast of Black Mesa is a 1950 American Western film directed by Ray Nazarro and starring Charles Starrett, Smiley Burnette, Martha Hyer, Richard Bailey and Stanley Andrews. The film was released by Columbia Pictures on April 13, 1950. The film is the 46th of 65 films in the Durango Kid series.

== Cast ==
- Charles Starrett as Steve Norman / Durango Kid
- Smiley Burnette as Smiley
- Martha Hyer as Ruth Dorn
- Richard Bailey as Andrew Vaning
- Stanley Andrews as Sheriff Grasset
- William Haade as Dayton
- Lane Chandler as Ted Thorp
- William Gould as Walt Dorn
- Robert J. Wilke as Curt - Henchman
- Chuck Roberson as Kramer - Henchman
- Ozie Waters as Ozie
