= Prairie Raiders =

1947 film by Derwin Abrahams

- Theatrical release poster
- Directed by: Derwin Abrahams
- Screenplay by: Ed Earl Repp
- Produced by: Colbert Clark
- Starring: Charles Starrett; Nancy Saunders; Mark Roberts; Ozie Waters; Smiley Burnette
- Cinematography: George F. Kelley
- Edited by: Paul Borofsky
- Production company: Columbia Pictures
- Distributed by: Columbia Pictures
- Release date: May 29, 1947
- Running time: 54 minutes
- Country: United States
- Language: English

Prairie Raiders is a 1947 American Western film directed by Derwin Abrahams and written by Ed Earl Repp. The film stars Charles Starrett, Nancy Saunders, Mark Roberts, Ozie Waters and Smiley Burnette. The film was released on May 29, 1947, by Columbia Pictures. This was the twenty-third of 65 films in the Durango Kid series.

== Cast ==
- Charles Starrett as Steve Bolton / The Durango Kid
- Nancy Saunders as Ann Bradford
- Mark Roberts as Bronc Masters
- Ozie Waters as Ozie Waters
- Smiley Burnette as Smiley Burnette
- Hugh Prosser as Spud Henley
- Lane Bradford as Stark
- Ray Bennett as Flagg
- Douglas D. Coppin as Clerk Briggs
- Steve Clark as Sheriff
- Tommy Coats as Shorty
- Frank LaRue as Bradford
- John Cason as Cinco
- Sam Flint as Secretary of the Interior
