= Rough Ridin' Justice =

1945 film by Derwin Abrahams

- Theatrical release poster
- Directed by: Derwin Abrahams
- Screenplay by: Elizabeth Beecher
- Produced by: Jack Fier
- Starring: Charles Starrett; Dub Taylor; Betty Jane Graham; Jimmy Wakely
- Cinematography: George Meehan
- Edited by: Aaron Stell
- Production company: Columbia Pictures
- Distributed by: Columbia Pictures
- Release date: March 14, 1945
- Running time: 58 minutes
- Country: United States
- Language: English

Rough Ridin' Justice is a 1945 American Western film directed by Derwin Abrahams and written by Elizabeth Beecher. The film stars Charles Starrett, Dub Taylor, Betty Jane Graham and Jimmy Wakely. The film was released on March 14, 1945, by Columbia Pictures.

== Cast ==
- Charles Starrett as Steve Holden
- Dub Taylor as Cannonball
- Betty Jane Graham as Gail Trent
- Jimmy Wakely as Jimmy Wakely
- Wheeler Oakman as Virgil Trent
- Jack Ingram as Nick Dunham
- Forrest Taylor as Sidney Padgett
- Jack Rockwell as Sheriff Kramer
- Edmund Cobb as Harris
- Dan White as Mike
- Bob Kortman as Pete
- George Chesebro as Lacey
- Robert Ross as Bob
- Steve Clark as Gray
