= Outlaws of the Rockies =

1945 film by Ray Nazarro

- Theatrical release poster
- Directed by: Ray Nazarro
- Screenplay by: J. Benton Cheney
- Produced by: Colbert Clark
- Starring: Charles Starrett; Tex Harding; Dub Taylor; Carole Mathews; Carolina Cotton; Spade Cooley
- Cinematography: George F. Kelley
- Edited by: Aaron Stell
- Production company: Columbia Pictures
- Distributed by: Columbia Pictures
- Release date: September 18, 1945
- Running time: 54 minutes
- Country: United States
- Language: English

Outlaws of the Rockies is a 1945 American Western film directed by Ray Nazarro and written by J. Benton Cheney. The film stars Charles Starrett, Tex Harding, Dub Taylor, Carole Mathews, Carolina Cotton and Spade Cooley. The film was released on September 18, 1945, by Columbia Pictures. This was the fifth of 65 films in the Durango Kid series.

== Cast ==
- Charles Starrett as Steve Williams / The Durango Kid
- Tex Harding as Tex Harding
- Dub Taylor as Cannonball
- Carole Mathews as Jane Stuart
- Carolina Cotton as Carolina Cotton
- Spade Cooley as Spade Cooley
- Philip Van Zandt as Dan Chantry
- I. Stanford Jolley as Ace Lanning
- George Chesebro as Bill Jason
- Steve Clark as Potter
- Jack Rockwell as Sheriff Hall
- Frank LaRue as Drake
- James T. "Bud" Nelson as Pete
