= Galloping Thunder (1946 film) =

1946 film by Ray Nazarro

- Directed by: Ray Nazarro
- Written by: Ed Earl Repp
- Produced by: Colbert Clark
- Starring: Charles Starrett
- Cinematography: George F. Kelley
- Edited by: Richard Fantl
- Production company: Columbia Pictures
- Distributed by: Columbia Pictures
- Release date: April 25, 1946
- Running time: 54 minutes
- Country: United States
- Language: English

Galloping Thunder is a 1946 American Western film directed by Ray Nazarro and starring Charles Starrett. This was the twelfth of 65 films in the Durango Kid series.

== Cast ==
- Charles Starrett as Steve Reynolds / The Durango Kid
- Adele Roberts as Jud Temple
- Merle Travis as Guitar Player
- The Bronco Busters as Themselves
- Smiley Burnette as Smiley Burnette
- Richard Bailey as Grat Hanlon
- Curt Barrett as Ranch Foreman
- Ray Bennett as Henchman Wyatt
- Budd Buster as Barber
- Roy Butler as Rancher
- Edmund Cobb as Henchman Barstow
- Slim Duncan as Fife and Fiddle Player
- Nolan Leary as Curt Lawson
- Kermit Maynard as Henchman Krag
- Merrill McCormick as Rancher
- John Merton as Henchman Regan
- Bob Reeves as Cowhand
- Matty Roubert as Man with Match
- Forrest Taylor as Colonel Collins

== Bibliography ==
- Martin, Len D. Columbia Checklist: The Feature Films, Serials, Cartoons, and Short Subjects of Columbia Pictures Corporation, 1922-1988. McFarland, 1991.
