= Blazing Across the Pecos =

1948 film by Ray Nazarro

- Theatrical release poster
- Directed by: Ray Nazarro
- Screenplay by: Norman S. Hall
- Produced by: Colbert Clark
- Starring: Charles Starrett; Patricia Barry; Paul Campbell; Charles C. Wilson; Thomas E. Jackson; Red Arnall; Smiley Burnette
- Cinematography: Ira H. Morgan
- Edited by: Richard Fantl
- Production company: Columbia Pictures
- Distributed by: Columbia Pictures
- Release date: July 1, 1948
- Running time: 55 minutes
- Country: United States
- Language: English

Blazing Across the Pecos is a 1948 American Western film directed by Ray Nazarro and written by Norman S. Hall. The film stars Charles Starrett, Patricia Barry, Paul Campbell, Charles C. Wilson, Thomas E. Jackson, Red Arnall and Smiley Burnette. The film was released on July 1, 1948, by Columbia Pictures. This was the thirty-second of 65 films in the Durango Kid series.

== Plot ==
Businessman Ace Brockway and his henchmen are secretly arming hostile Indians with rifles to attack wagon trains. Brockway has such contempt for the law and the people that he employs the buffoon restaurant owner Smiley Burnette as town marshal and Jim Traynor to run the newspaper, printing only what Brockway tells him to. The Durango Kid becomes Burnette's deputy and brings law and order to the West.

== Cast ==
- Charles Starrett as Steve Blake aka The Durango Kid
- Patricia Barry as Lola Carter
- Paul Campbell as Jim Traynor
- Charles C. Wilson as Ace Brockway
- Thomas E. Jackson as Matt Carter
- Red Arnall as Guitar Player
- Smiley Burnette as Smiley Burnette
- Jack Ingram as 'Buckshot' Thomas
- Chief Thundercloud as Chief Bear Claw
- Pat O'Malley as Mike Doyle
- Jock Mahoney as Bill Wheeler
- Frank McCarroll as Gunsmoke Ballard
- Pierce Lyden as Jason
- Paul Conrad as Sleepy Larsen
