= The Durango Kid =

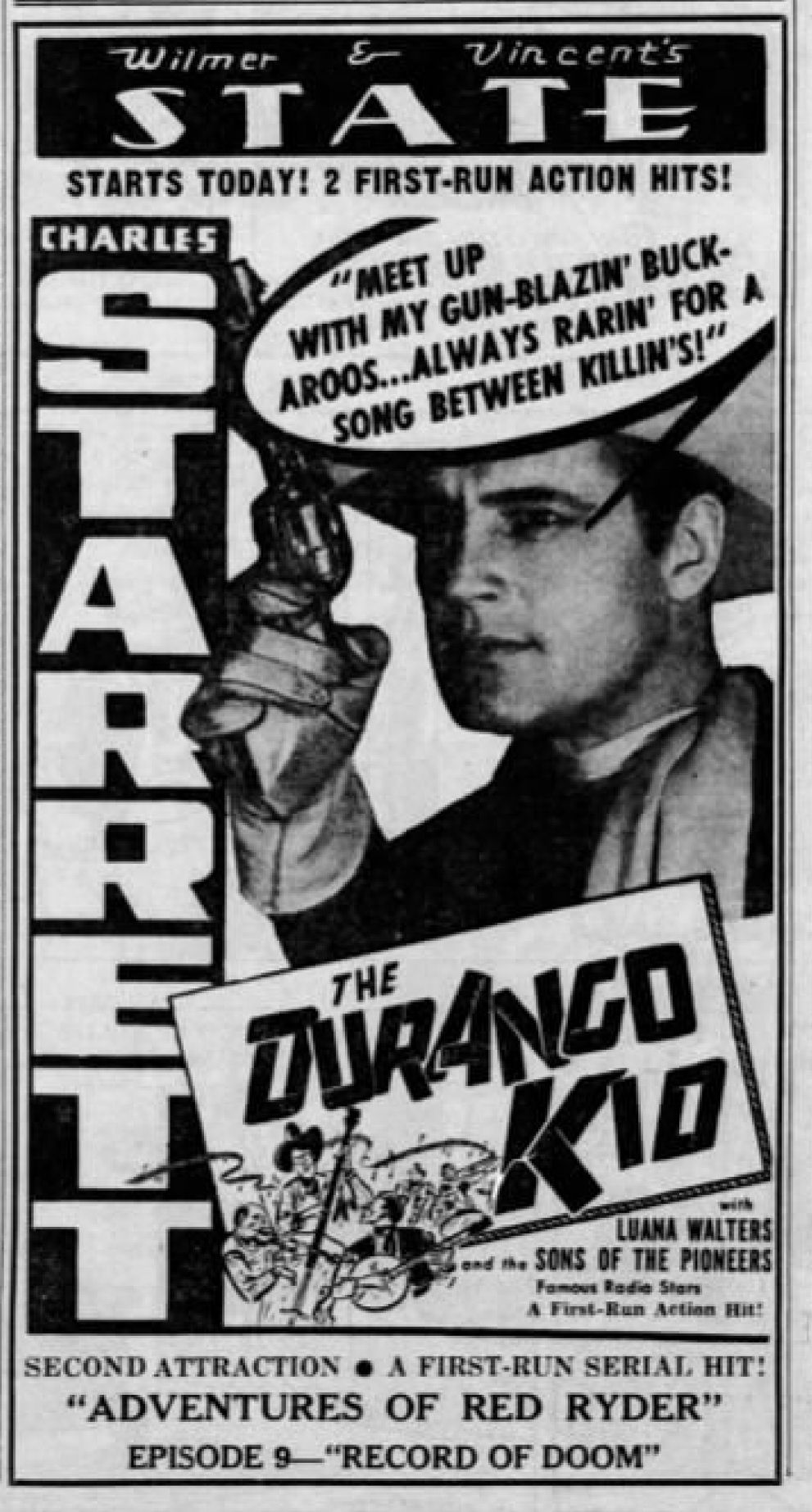
- Newspaper advertisement
- Directed by: Lambert Hillyer
- Screenplay by: Paul Franklin
- Produced by: Jack Fier
- Starring: Charles Starrett; Luana Walters; Kenneth MacDonald
- Cinematography: John Stumar
- Edited by: Richard Fantl
- Music by: Bob Nolan; Tim Spencer
- Distributed by: Columbia Pictures Corporation
- Release date: August 15, 1940
- Running time: 61 minutes
- Country: United States
- Language: English

The Durango Kid is a 1940 American Western directed by Lambert Hillyer, starring Charles Starrett, Luana Walters and Kenneth McDonald. This is the first of 65 Durango Kid movies Starrett made at Columbia Pictures.

The Durango Kid was just another of Columbia's B-western features in its popular Charles Starrett series, with no special distinction except for its standard hero-vs.-villain plotline. In 1945 the studio produced a sequel, The Return of the Durango Kid, which caught on with moviegoers and became a series. Starrett went on to portray The Durango Kid full-time until his retirement in 1952.

== Plot ==
Bill Lowry returns home to his family ranch, to find that ruthless businessman Mace Ballard is trying to force the townspeople into selling their land. Opposing Ballard is Lowry's father, who leaves for the marshal's office to press charges. On his way there, an armed sniper—Ballard—kills him. This prompts Bill to masquerade as The Durango Kid, fabled vigilante who fights for justice. While Durango harasses Ballard and terrorizes Ballard's gunmen, Bill becomes the marshal's special deputy, investigating Ballard's activities legally. Ballard is charged with murder but escapes, firing at the law. He is killed in the ensuing gunplay.

== Cast ==
- Charles Starrett as Bill Lowry / The Durango Kid
- Luana Walters as Nancy Winslow
- Kenneth MacDonald as Mace Ballard
- Francis Walker as Henchman Steve
- Forrest Taylor as Ben Winslow
- Melvin Lang as Marshal Dan Trayboe
- Bob Nolan as Bob, member of Sons of the Pioneers
- Pat Brady as Pat, member of Sons of the Pioneers
- Lloyd Perryman, Karl Farr, Hugh Farr, members of Sons of the Pioneers
- Frank LaRue as Sam Lowry

== Film series ==
The Durango Kid began a series of 65 films released by Columbia Pictures.

1. The Durango Kid (Aug 1940)
2. The Return of the Durango Kid (April 1945)
3. Both Barrels Blazing (May 1945)
4. Rustlers of the Badlands (Aug 1945)
5. Outlaws of the Rockies (Sept 1945)
6. Blazing the Western Trail (Oct 1945)
7. Lawless Empire (Nov 1945)
8. Texas Panhandle (Dec 1945)
9. Frontier Gunlaw (Jan 1946)
10. Roaring Rangers (Feb 1946)
11. Gunning for Vengeance (March 1946)
12. Galloping Thunder (April 1946)
13. Two-Fisted Stranger (May 1946)
14. The Desert Horseman (July 1946)
15. Heading West (Aug 1946)
16. Landrush (Oct 1946)
17. Terror Trail (Nov 1946)
18. The Fighting Frontiersman (Dec 1946)
19. South of the Chisholm Trail (Jan 1947)
20. The Lone Hand Texan (March 1947)
21. West of Dodge City (March 1947)
22. Law of the Canyon (April 1947)
23. Prairie Raiders (May 1947)
24. The Stranger from Ponca City (July 1947)
25. Riders of the Lone Star (Aug 1947)
26. Buckaroo from Powder River (Oct 1947)
27. Last Days of Boot Hill (Nov 1947)
28. Six-Gun Law (Jan 1948)
29. Phantom Valley (Feb 1948)
30. West of Sonora (March 1948)
31. Whirlwind Raiders (May 1948)
32. Blazing Across the Pecos (July 1948)
33. Trail to Laredo (Aug 1948)
34. El Dorado Pass (Oct 1948)
35. Quick on the Trigger (Dec 1948)
36. Challenge of the Range (Feb 1949)
37. Laramie (May 1949)
38. The Blazing Trail (July 1949)
39. South of Death Valley (Aug 1949)
40. Horsemen of the Sierras (Sept 1949)
41. Bandits of El Dorado (Oct 1949)
42. Desert Vigilante (Nov 1949)
43. Renegades of the Sage (Nov 1949)
44. Frontier Outpost (Dec 1949)
45. Trail of the Rustlers (Feb 1950)
46. Outcast of Black Mesa (April 1950)
47. Texas Dynamo (June 1950)
48. Streets of Ghost Town (Aug 1950)
49. Across the Badlands (Sept 1950)
50. Raiders of Tomahawk Creek (Oct 1950)
51. Lightning Guns (Dec 1950)
52. Prairie Roundup (Jan 1951)
53. Ridin' the Outlaw Trail (Feb 1951)
54. Fort Savage Raiders (March 1951)
55. Snake River Desperadoes (May 1951)
56. Bonanza Town (July 1951)
57. Cyclone Fury (Aug 1951)
58. The Kid from Amarillo (Oct 1951)
59. Pecos River (Dec 1951)
60. Smoky Canyon (Jan 1952)
61. The Hawk of Wild River (Feb 1952)
62. Laramie Mountains (April 1952)
63. The Rough, Tough West (June 1952)
64. Junction City (July 1952)
65. The Kid from Broken Gun (Aug 1952)
