= Both Barrels Blazing =

1945 film by Derwin Abrahams

- Directed by: Derwin Abrahams
- Screenplay by: William Livley
- Starring: Charles Starrett
- Cinematography: George Meehan
- Edited by: Henry Batista
- Color process: Black and white
- Production company: Columbia Pictures
- Distributed by: Columbia Pictures
- Release date: May 7, 1945
- Running time: 57 minutes
- Country: United States
- Language: English

Both Barrels Blazing is a 1945 American Western film directed by Derwin Abrahams and starring Charles Starrett. This was the third of 65 films in the Durango Kid series.

== Plot ==
The outlaw gangs are robbing the railroads and the Rangers cannot follow them when they move to New Mexico. So Kip decides to take a vacationto New Mexico and, as the Durango Kid, brings Cass and his gang back to justice. But Cass and his gang are killed at the bank in a double cross and Kip must still find the loot. For this, he enlists the help of Tex and Grubstake, although Grubstake does not know it.

== Cast ==
- Charles Starrett as Kip Allen/ The Durango Kid
- Tex Harding as Tex Harding
- Dub Taylor as Cannonball
- Pat Parrish as Gail Radford
- The Jesters as Musicians
- Guy Bonham as Singing Cowhand (as The Jesters)
- Walter Carlson as Singing Cowhand (as The Jesters)
- Dwight Latham as Singing Cowhand (as The Jesters)

== See also ==
- List of American films of 1945
