= The Ghost Talks (1949 film) =

1949 American short film by Jules White

- Directed by: Jules White
- Written by: Felix Adler
- Produced by: Jules White
- Starring: Moe Howard; Larry Fine; Shemp Howard; Phil Arnold; Don Brodie; Nancy Saunders
- Cinematography: M.A. Anderson
- Edited by: Edwin H. Bryant
- Distributed by: Columbia Pictures
- Release date: February 3, 1949 (U.S.)
- Running time: 16:20
- Country: United States
- Language: English

The Ghost Talks is a 1949 comedy horror short subject, directed by Jules White. The stars are the American slapstick comedy team The Three Stooges (Moe Howard, Larry Fine and Shemp Howard). It is the 113th entry in the series released by Columbia Pictures starring the comedians, who released 190 shorts for the studio between 1934 and 1959.

== Plot ==
Tasked with the responsibility of relocating furniture from the eerie confines of Smorgasbord Castle, the Stooges, employed as movers, initially proceed with their duties amidst intermittent frights. However, their endeavors take an unexpected turn when they encounter a clanking suit of armor purportedly inhabited by the ghostly presence of Peeping Tom. Despite initial trepidation, Tom succeeds in assuring the Stooges of his benign intentions, recounting his spectral origins and subsequent entrapment within the armor following an ill-fated encounter with Lady Godiva, culminating in his imprisonment for a millennium.

Undeterred by Tom's warning of impending misfortune should they attempt to relocate him, the Stooges persist in their task, prompting a series of comedic mishaps as they endeavor to move the haunted suit of armor. These incidents include a frog intrusion and the deception perpetrated by an owl assuming the guise of a death head spectral entity. Faced with escalating chaos, the Stooges seek refuge in another chamber, only to witness the unexpected arrival of Lady Godiva, who whisks Tom away atop a horse.

As the Stooges eagerly observe the departure, their anticipation is abruptly interrupted by the pelting of pies and the raucous cheers of an unseen crowd.

== Cast ==
=== Credited ===
- Moe Howard as Moe
- Larry Fine as Larry
- Shemp Howard as Shemp

=== Uncredited ===
- Phil Arnold as Peeping Tom the Tailor (voice)
- Don Brodie as Peeping Tom the Tailor (live-action, flashback)
- Nancy Saunders as Lady Godiva
- Jules White as Red Skeleton, Chess-playing skeleton (voice)

== Production notes ==
The Ghost Talks was filmed on August 26–29, 1947, and released 18 months later on February 3, 1949. It was remade in 1956 as Creeps, using ample stock footage.

Director Jules White voiced the skeleton identifying himself as "Red Skeleton", a reference to comedian Red Skelton.

The NBC chimes are heard when Moe hits Shemp three times on his head.

== See also ==
- List of ghost films
