= El Dorado Pass =

1948 film by Ray Nazarro

- Theatrical release poster
- Directed by: Ray Nazarro
- Screenplay by: Earle Snell
- Produced by: Colbert Clark
- Starring: Charles Starrett; Smiley Burnette; Elena Verdugo; Steve Darrell; Rory Mallinson; Ted Mapes
- Cinematography: Rex Wimpy
- Edited by: Burton Kramer
- Production company: Columbia Pictures
- Distributed by: Columbia Pictures
- Release date: October 14, 1948
- Running time: 55 minutes
- Country: United States
- Language: English

El Dorado Pass is a 1948 American Western film directed by Ray Nazarro and written by Earle Snell. The film stars Charles Starrett, Smiley Burnette, Elena Verdugo, Steve Darrell, Rory Mallinson and Ted Mapes. The film was released on October 14, 1948, by Columbia Pictures. This was the thirty-fourth of 65 films in the Durango Kid series.

== Cast ==
- Charles Starrett as Steve Clayton / The Durango Kid
- Smiley Burnette as Smiley Burnette
- Elena Verdugo as Dolores Martinez
- Steve Darrell as Page
- Rory Mallinson as Sheriff Tom Wright
- Ted Mapes as Dodd
- Stanley Blystone as Barlow
- Shorty Thompson as Shorty Thompson
