= Gallant Defender =

1935 film

- Directed by: David Selman
- Screenplay by: Ford Beebe
- Story by: Peter B. Kyne
- Produced by: Harry L. Decker
- Starring: Charles Starrett
- Cinematography: Benjamin Kline
- Edited by: Al Clark
- Color process: Black and white
- Production company: Columbia Pictures
- Distributed by: Columbia Pictures
- Release date: November 30, 1935
- Running time: 60 minutes
- Country: United States
- Language: English

Gallant Defender is a 1935 American Western film directed by David Selman and starring Charles Starrett.

== Plot ==
Roving cowboy is involved in struggle between homesteaders and cattle ranchers.

== Cast ==
- Charles Starrett as Johnny Flagg
- Joan Perry as Barbara McGrail
- Harry Woods as Barr Munro
- Edward LeSaint as Harvey Campbell (as Edward Le Saint)
- Jack Rube Clifford as Sheriff (as Jack Clifford)
- Al Bridge as Salty Smith
- Georgie Billings as Jimmy McGrail (as George Billings)
- George Chesebro as Joe Swale
- Sons of the Pioneers as Musicians

== See also ==
- List of American films of 1935
