= Buckaroo from Powder River =

1947 film by Ray Nazarro

- Theatrical release poster
- Directed by: Ray Nazarro
- Screenplay by: Norman S. Hall
- Produced by: Colbert Clark
- Starring: Charles Starrett; Eve Miller; Forrest Taylor; Paul Campbell; Smiley Burnette
- Cinematography: George F. Kelley
- Edited by: Paul Borofsky
- Production company: Columbia Pictures
- Distributed by: Columbia Pictures
- Release date: October 14, 1947
- Running time: 55 minutes
- Country: United States
- Language: English

Buckaroo from Powder River is a 1947 American Western film directed by Ray Nazarro and written by Norman S. Hall. The film stars Charles Starrett, Eve Miller, Forrest Taylor, Paul Campbell and Smiley Burnette. The film was released on October 14, 1947, by Columbia Pictures. This was the twenty-sixth of 65 films in the Durango Kid series.

== Cast ==
- Charles Starrett as Steve Lacey / The Durango Kid
- Eve Miller as Molly Parnell
- Forrest Taylor as Pop Ryland
- Paul Campbell as Tommy Ryland
- Smiley Burnette as Smiley Burnette
- Bert Dodson as Bass Player
- Fred S. Martin as Accordion Player
- Jerry Scoggins as Guitar Player
