= The Stranger from Ponca City =

1947 film by Derwin Abrahams

- Theatrical release poster
- Directed by: Derwin Abrahams
- Screenplay by: Ed Earl Repp
- Produced by: Colbert Clark
- Starring: Charles Starrett; Virginia Hunter; Texas Jim Lewis; Smiley Burnette
- Cinematography: George F. Kelley
- Edited by: Burton Kramer
- Production company: Columbia Pictures
- Distributed by: Columbia Pictures
- Release date: July 3, 1947
- Running time: 56 minutes
- Country: United States
- Language: English

The Stranger from Ponca City is a 1947 American Western film directed by Derwin Abrahams and written by Ed Earl Repp. The film stars Charles Starrett, Virginia Hunter, Texas Jim Lewis and Smiley Burnette. The film was released on July 3, 1947, by Columbia Pictures. This was the twenty-fourth of 65 films in the Durango Kid series.

== Cast ==
- Charles Starrett as Steve Larkin / The Durango Kid
- Virginia Hunter as Terry Saunders
- Texas Jim Lewis as Texas Jim Lewis
- Smiley Burnette as Smiley Burnette
- Paul Campbell as Tug Carter
- Forrest Taylor as Grat Carmody
- Jim Diehl as Flip Dugan
- Ted Mapes as Fargo
- Jock Mahoney as Tensleep
- Tom McDonough as Bill
- Johnny Carpenter as Duke
- Bud Osborne as Jed
