= Creeps (film) =

1956 film by Jules White

- Directed by: Jules White
- Screenplay by: Jack White
- Story by: Felix Adler
- Produced by: Jules White
- Starring: Moe Howard; Larry Fine; Shemp Howard; Phil Arnold (voice); Jules White (voice)
- Cinematography: Henry Freulich
- Edited by: Harold White
- Distributed by: Columbia Pictures
- Release date: February 2, 1956 (U.S.)
- Running time: 15:40
- Country: United States
- Language: English

Creeps is a 1956 comedy horror short subject. It was directed by Jules White, starring American slapstick comedy team The Three Stooges (Moe Howard, Larry Fine and Shemp Howard). It is the 168th entry in the series released by Columbia Pictures starring the comedians, who released 190 shorts for the studio between 1934 and 1959.

== Plot ==
The Stooges regale their three sons with tales of their past exploits, recounting instances when they worked as movers tasked with relocating furniture from haunted locales. In one narrative, they recall their assignment at the foreboding Smorgasbord Castle, where they encounter a suit of armor allegedly inhabited by the ghostly figure of Peeping Tom. Despite initial apprehension, the Stooges are reassured of Tom's benign nature.

However, their determination to relocate the haunted armor leads to a series of comedic misadventures, including encounters with disruptive elements like frogs and close brushes with perilous contraptions such as a guillotine.

== Cast ==
=== Credited ===
- Moe Howard as Moe/Moe Jr.
- Larry Fine as Larry/Larry Jr.
- Shemp Howard as Shemp/Shemp Jr.

=== Uncredited ===
- Phil Arnold as voice of Sir Tom
  - Johnny Kascier as Sir Tom
- Jules White as voice of Red Skeleton (stock footage)

== Production notes ==
Creeps is a remake of The Ghost Talks! (1949), incorporating substantial stock footage from the original film. Filmed on May 16, 1955, new scenes includes the babies (also the Stooges) and introduce a torture room sequence wherein Moe's trousers undergo an unfortunate encounter with slicing implements.

Notably, during Sir Tom's narrative, a brief shot depicts the Stooges smoking, followed by a recycled clip where they are not. In addition, Creeps incorporates the distinctive sounds of the NBC chimes: first, when Moe administers three strikes to Shemp's head, and again when the Stooges employ hammers on the babies' heads.

== See also ==
- List of American films of 1956
