= Last Days of Boot Hill =

1947 film by Ray Nazarro

- Theatrical release poster
- Directed by: Ray Nazarro
- Screenplay by: Norman S. Hall
- Produced by: Colbert Clark
- Starring: Charles Starrett; Virginia Hunter; Paul Campbell; Mary Newton; Smiley Burnette
- Cinematography: George F. Kelley
- Edited by: Paul Borofsky
- Production company: Columbia Pictures
- Distributed by: Columbia Pictures
- Release date: November 20, 1947
- Running time: 55 minutes
- Country: United States
- Language: English

Last Days of Boot Hill is a 1947 American Western film directed by Ray Nazarro and written by Norman S. Hall. The film stars Charles Starrett, Virginia Hunter, Paul Campbell, Mary Newton and Smiley Burnette. The film was released on November 20, 1947, by Columbia Pictures. This was the twenty-seventh of 65 films in the Durango Kid series.

== Cast ==
- Charles Starrett as Steve Waring / The Durango Kid
- Virginia Hunter as Paula Thorpe
- Paul Campbell as Frank Rayburn
- Mary Newton as Clara Brent
- Smiley Burnette as Smiley Burnette
