= Rustlers of the Badlands =

1945 film by Derwin Abrahams

- Directed by: Derwin Abrahams
- Written by: J. Benton Cheney; Richard Hill Wilkinson
- Produced by: Colbert Clark
- Starring: Charles Starrett; Carla Balenda; Dub Taylor
- Cinematography: George Meehan
- Edited by: Aaron Stell
- Music by: Mischa Bakaleinikoff
- Production company: Columbia Pictures
- Distributed by: Columbia Pictures
- Release date: August 16, 1945
- Running time: 55 minutes
- Country: United States
- Language: English

Rustlers of the Badlands is a 1945 American Western film directed by Derwin Abrahams and starring Charles Starrett, Carla Balenda and Dub Taylor. This was the fourth of 65 films in the Durango Kid series.

== Cast ==
- Charles Starrett as Steve Lindsay / The Durango Kid
- Tex Harding as Tex Harding
- Dub Taylor as Cannonball
- Carla Balenda as Sally Boylston
- George Eldredge as Jim Norton
- Edward Howard as Henchman Regan
- Karl Hackett as Sheriff Mallory
- James T. 'Bud' Nelson as Henchman
- Frank McCarroll as Henchman
- Carl Sepulveda as Henchman

== Bibliography ==
- Bernard A. Drew. Motion Picture Series and Sequels: A Reference Guide. Routledge, 2013.
