= Mr. Skitch =

1933 film by James Cruze

- Theatrical release poster
- Directed by: James Cruze
- Screenplay by: Sonya Levien; Ralph Spence
- Starring: Will Rogers; Rochelle Hudson; ZaSu Pitts; Florence Desmond; Harry Green; Charles Starrett
- Cinematography: John F. Seitz
- Edited by: Irene Morra
- Production company: Fox Film Corporation
- Distributed by: Fox Film Corporation
- Release date: December 22, 1933
- Running time: 70 minutes
- Country: United States
- Language: English

Mr. Skitch is a 1933 American comedy film directed by James Cruze and written by Sonya Levien and Ralph Spence. The film stars Will Rogers, Rochelle Hudson, ZaSu Pitts, Florence Desmond, Harry Green and Charles Starrett. The film was released on December 22, 1933, by Fox Film Corporation.

== Plot ==
Ira Skitch, prominent resident of Flat River, Missouri, has fallen victim to the Great Depression and the bank has foreclosed on his home. With only a pittance settlement to show for it, Ira loads his wife, adult daughter Emily, three younger children, and six dogs into the beat-up family jalopy. They decide to drive to Los Angeles and take the slow, scenic route with which to educate their children.

At Yellowstone National Park, Emily is saved from drowning by handsome Harvey Denby. Ashamed of her newfound poverty, Emily pretends to be wealthy.

Denby comes from a wealthy family and is preparing to enter West Point, but the smitten man follows the Skitch family on the journey from one auto camp to another. Ira has made friends with Sam Cohen, a Yiddish ex-New Yorker who had been ordered to retire for his health and now travels the USA in a luxury motor home. Wife Maddie does not make friends with two bears who invade their campsite and devour their lunch. The bears turn out to be tame mascots, but Maddie is not convinced.

When they arrive at the Lake Tahoe area that borders Nevada and California, Ira wins $3,000.00 in a legal casino by latching onto the coattails of a friendly high-roller, Cliff Merriweather. Certain his luck cannot break he returns the next night and loses it all.

Figuring if Ira has learned anything on the trip it is how auto camps are run, Denby uses the family wealth to build a luxury auto camp in Flat River, makes Ira the manager and tells him the money came from Cohen. Ira eventually catches on to the deception. However, since Harvey is now his son-in-law, he tables his objections.

== Cast ==
- Will Rogers as Mr. Ira Skitch
- Rochelle Hudson as Emily Skitch
- ZaSu Pitts as Mrs. Maddie Skitch
- Florence Desmond as Flo
- Harry Green as Sam Cohen
- Charles Starrett as Harvey Denby
- Eugene Pallette as Cliff Merriweather
- Charles Middleton as Bank Foreclosure Man (uncredited)
- Charles Lane as Hotel Clerk (uncredited)
- Wally Albright as Skitch's Young Son (uncredited)
- Cleora and Glorea Robb as Skitch's Young Daughters (uncredited)
  - George Irving as Harvey Denby's Uncle (uncredited)
- Sam Flint as General Matthews (uncredited)
- Howard Lally as Indian Guide (uncredited)
- Frank Melton as Perry, Boy who Jilts Emily (uncredited)

== Reception ==
The film was one of Fox's biggest hits of the year.
