= Heading West (film) =

1946 film

- Theatrical release poster
- Directed by: Ray Nazarro
- Screenplay by: Ed Earl Repp
- Produced by: Colbert Clark
- Starring: Charles Starrett; Doris Houck; Hank Penny; Smiley Burnette
- Cinematography: George Meehan
- Edited by: Henry Batista
- Production company: Columbia Pictures
- Distributed by: Columbia Pictures
- Release date: August 15, 1946
- Running time: 54 minutes
- Country: United States
- Language: English

Heading West is a 1946 American Western film directed by Ray Nazarro and written by Ed Earl Repp. The film stars Charles Starrett, Doris Houck, Hank Penny and Smiley Burnette. The film was released on August 15, 1946, by Columbia Pictures. This was the fifteenth of 65 films in the Durango Kid series.

== Cast ==
- Charles Starrett as Steve Randall / The Durango Kid
- Doris Houck as Anne Parker
- Hank Penny as Guitar Player
- Smiley Burnette as Smiley Burnette
- Nolan Leary as Sam Parker
- Norman Willis as Rance Hudson
- Bud Geary as Blaze Curlew
- Wally Wales as Jim Mallory
- Tommy Coats as Carter
- Frank McCarroll as Red Curlew
- Stanley Price as Henchy
- Tom Chatterton as Doctor
- John Merton as Kelso
