= Challenge of the Range =

1949 film by Ray Nazarro

- Theatrical release poster
- Directed by: Ray Nazarro
- Screenplay by: Ed Earl Repp
- Produced by: Colbert Clark
- Starring: Charles Starrett; Paula Raymond; Billy Halop; Steve Darrell; Henry Hall; Robert Filmer; Smiley Burnette
- Cinematography: Rex Wimpy
- Edited by: Paul Borofsky
- Production company: Columbia Pictures
- Distributed by: Columbia Pictures
- Release date: February 3, 1949
- Running time: 56 minutes
- Country: United States
- Language: English

Challenge of the Range is a 1949 American Western film directed by Ray Nazarro and written by Ed Earl Repp. The film stars Charles Starrett, Paula Raymond, Billy Halop, Steve Darrell, Henry Hall, Robert Filmer and Smiley Burnette. The film was released on February 3, 1949, by Columbia Pictures. This was the thirty-sixth of 65 films in the Durango Kid series.

== Cast ==
- Charles Starrett as Steve Roper / The Durango Kid
- Paula Raymond as Judy Barton
- Billy Halop as Reb Matson
- Steve Darrell as Cal Matson
- Henry Hall as Jim Barton
- Robert Filmer as Great Largo
- Smiley Burnette as Smiley Burnette
