= Roaring Rangers =

1946 film by Ray Nazarro

- Theatrical release poster
- Directed by: Ray Nazarro
- Screenplay by: Barry Shipman
- Produced by: Colbert Clark
- Starring: Charles Starrett; Adele Roberts; Merle Travis; Smiley Burnette
- Cinematography: George F. Kelley
- Edited by: Jerome Thoms
- Production company: Columbia Pictures
- Distributed by: Columbia Pictures
- Release date: February 14, 1946
- Running time: 58 minutes
- Country: United States
- Language: English

Roaring Rangers is a 1946 American Western film directed by Ray Nazarro and written by Barry Shipman. The film stars Charles Starrett, Adele Roberts, Merle Travis and Smiley Burnette. The film was released on February 14, 1946, by Columbia Pictures. This was the tenth of 65 films in the Durango Kid series.

== Cast ==
- Charles Starrett as Steve Randall / The Durango Kid
- Adele Roberts as Doris Connor
- Merle Travis as Travis
- Smiley Burnette as Smiley Burnette
- Jack Rockwell as Sheriff Jeff Connor
- Ed Cassidy as Bill Connor
- Mickey Kuhn as Larry Connor
- Edmund Cobb as Taggert
- Ted Mapes as Slade
- Gerald Mackey as Scrud
