= South of the Chisholm Trail =

1947 film by Derwin Abrahams

- Theatrical release poster
- Directed by: Derwin Abrahams
- Screenplay by: Michael Simmons
- Produced by: Colbert Clark
- Starring: Charles Starrett; Nancy Saunders; Hank Newman; Smiley Burnette
- Cinematography: George F. Kelley
- Edited by: Paul Borofsky
- Production company: Columbia Pictures
- Distributed by: Columbia Pictures
- Release date: January 30, 1947
- Running time: 58 minutes
- Country: United States
- Language: English

South of the Chisholm Trail is a 1947 American Western film directed by Derwin Abrahams and written by Michael Simmons. The film stars Charles Starrett, Nancy Saunders, Hank Newman and Smiley Burnette. The film was released on January 30, 1947, by Columbia Pictures. This was the nineteenth of 65 films in the Durango Kid series.

== Cast ==
- Charles Starrett as Steve Haley / The Durango Kid
- Nancy Saunders as Nora Grant
- Hank Newman as Hank Newman
- Smiley Burnette as Smiley Burnette
- Frank Sully as Big Jim Grady
- Jim Diehl as Berke
- Jack Ingram as Chet Tobin
- George Chesebro as Doc Walker
- Frank LaRue as Pop Grant
- Jock Mahoney as Thorpe
- Eddie Parker as Sheriff Palmer
