= Phantom Valley =

1948 film by Ray Nazarro

- Theatrical release poster
- Directed by: Ray Nazarro
- Screenplay by: J. Benton Cheney
- Produced by: Colbert Clark
- Starring: Charles Starrett; Virginia Hunter; Ozie Waters; Smiley Burnette
- Cinematography: George F. Kelley
- Edited by: Paul Borofsky
- Production company: Columbia Pictures
- Distributed by: Columbia Pictures
- Release date: February 19, 1948
- Running time: 53 minutes
- Country: United States
- Language: English

Phantom Valley is a 1948 American Western film directed by Ray Nazarro and written by J. Benton Cheney. The film stars Charles Starrett, Virginia Hunter, Ozie Waters and Smiley Burnette. The film was released on February 19, 1948, by Columbia Pictures. This was the twenty-ninth of 65 films in the Durango Kid series.

== Cast ==
- Charles Starrett as Steve Collins / The Durango Kid
- Virginia Hunter as Janice Littlejohn
- Ozie Waters as Ozie Waters
- Smiley Burnette as Smiley Burnette
- Joel Friedkin as Sam Littlejohn
- Robert Filmer as Bob Reynolds
- Mikel Conrad as Crag Parker
- Zon Murray as Frazer
- Sam Flint as Jim Durant
- Fred F. Sears as Ben Thiebold
- Teddy Infuhr as Chips
- Jerry Jerome as Bart
