= The Rough, Tough West =

1952 film by Ray Nazarro

- Directed by: Ray Nazarro
- Written by: Barry Shipman
- Produced by: Colbert Clark
- Starring: Charles Starrett; Carolina Cotton; Jock Mahoney
- Cinematography: Fayte M. Browne
- Edited by: Paul Borofsky
- Production company: Columbia Pictures
- Distributed by: Columbia Pictures
- Release date: June 15, 1952
- Running time: 54 minutes
- Country: United States
- Language: English

The Rough, Tough West is a 1952 American Western film directed by Ray Nazarro and starring Charles Starrett, Jock Mahoney and Carolina Cotton. This was the sixty-third of 65 films in the Durango Kid series. At this late date the series relied on cost-cutting measures to stay within a low budget, so this film contains footage from older Starrett westerns.

== Plot ==
The Durango Kid arrives in a mining town in search of an old friend, only to find the man is now running the town and has become corrupt, which brings him to disguise himself as a masked stranger while exposing his old pal as the felon he is.

== Partial cast ==
- Charles Starrett as Steve Holden / The Durango Kid
- Jock Mahoney as Big Jack Mahoney
- Carolina Cotton as Carolina
- Pee Wee King as Pee Wee - Golden West Cowboys Band Leader
- Pee Wee King and His Band as Musicians
- Raider as Durango's Horse
- Bullet as Steve's Horse
- Smiley Burnette as Fire Chief Smiley Burnette

== Bibliography ==
- Gene Freese. Jock Mahoney: The Life and Films of a Hollywood Stuntman. McFarland, 2013.
