= Six-Gun Law =

1948 film by Ray Nazarro

- Theatrical release poster
- Directed by: Ray Nazarro
- Screenplay by: Barry Shipman
- Produced by: Colbert Clark
- Starring: Charles Starrett; Nancy Saunders; Paul Campbell; Hugh Prosser; Curly Clements; Smiley Burnette
- Cinematography: George F. Kelley
- Edited by: Henry DeMond
- Production company: Columbia Pictures
- Distributed by: Columbia Pictures
- Release date: January 9, 1948
- Running time: 54 minutes
- Country: United States
- Language: English

Six-Gun Law is a 1948 American Western film directed by Ray Nazarro and written by Barry Shipman. The film stars Charles Starrett, Nancy Saunders, Paul Campbell, Hugh Prosser, Curly Clements and Smiley Burnette. The film was released on January 9, 1948, by Columbia Pictures. This was the twenty-eighth of 65 films in the Durango Kid series.

== Cast ==
- Charles Starrett as Steve Norris / The Durango Kid
- Nancy Saunders as June Wallace
- Paul Campbell as Jim Wallace
- Hugh Prosser as Decker
- Curly Clements as Curley
- Smiley Burnette as Smiley Burnette
- George Chesebro as Bret Wallace
- Billy Dix as Crowl
- Robert J. Wilke as Larson
- John L. Cason as Ben
- Ethan Laidlaw as Sheriff Brackett
- Pierce Lyden as Marshal Jack Reed
- Bud Osborne as Barton
- Budd Buster as Duffy
