= Charles Starrett =

American actor (1903–1986)

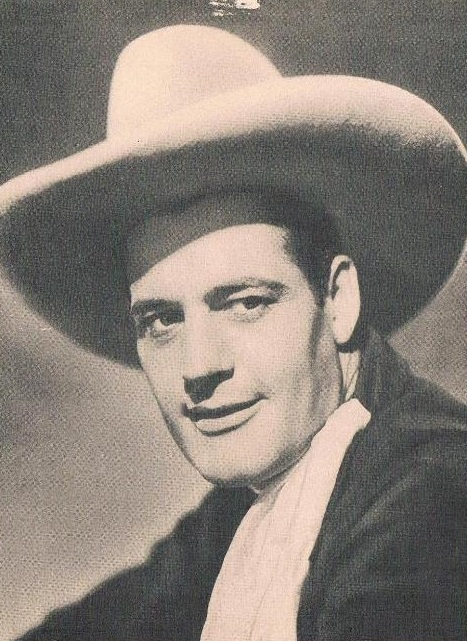
- Starrett in 1940
- Born: Charles Robert Starrett; March 28, 1903; Athol, Massachusetts U.S.
- Died: March 22, 1986 (aged 82); Borrego Springs, California U.S.
- Education: Dartmouth College
- Occupation: Actor
- Years active: 1926–1952
- Spouse: Mary McKinnon (m. 1927)
- Children: 2

Charles Robert Starrett (March 28, 1903 – March 22, 1986) was an American actor, best known for his starring role in the Durango Kid westerns. Starrett still holds the record for starring in the longest series of theatrical features: 131 westerns, all produced by Columbia Pictures.

== Early years ==
Starrett was born in Athol, Massachusetts, where his grandfather had built a prosperous tool works, L. S. Starrett Company. He graduated from the Worcester Academy in Massachusetts in 1922, then from Dartmouth College.

== Career ==
While Starrett was on the Dartmouth football team he was hired to play a football extra in the film The Quarterback (1926). Bitten by the acting bug, Starrett played minor roles in films and leading roles in stage plays. In 1928, he was a member of the Walker Company, a repertory theatre troupe headed by Stuart Walker.

He was signed by Paramount Pictures to a movie contract, and played the romantic lead in his first picture, Fast and Loose (1930), starring Frank Morgan, Miriam Hopkins, and Carole Lombard. Starrett starred in the Canadian production The Viking (1931), a rugged outdoor adventure filmed on location in Newfoundland, which had begun as a Paramount project.

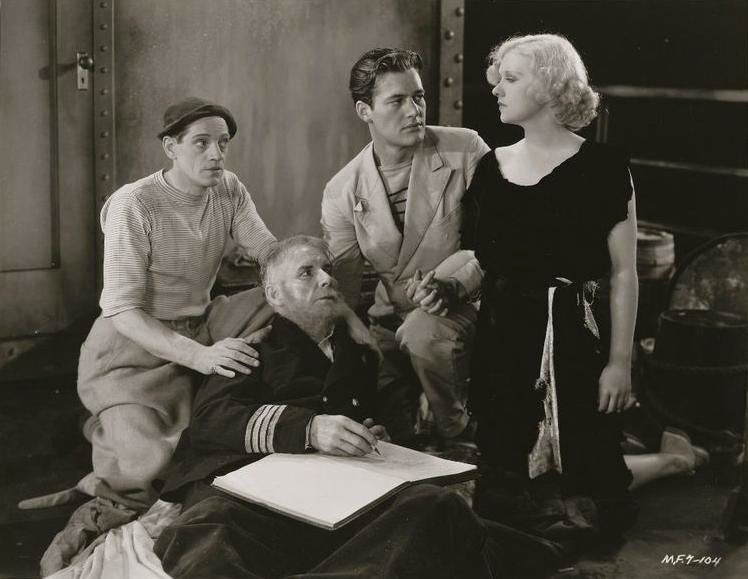
L-R: Eddie Borden, Clarence Geldart, Charles Starrett, and Anita Page in Jungle Bride (1933)

Starrett was very active for the next two years, playing juvenile leads for both major and minor studios. He was featured in Our Betters (1933), Murder on the Campus (1933), and as a young doctor named Orion in "Along Came Love", opposite Irene Hervey. Of Starrett's early character appearances, today's viewers may be most familiar with the Will Rogers picture Mr. Skitch (1933), featuring Starrett as the romantic lead.

Offscreen, Charles Starrett helped organize the Screen Actors Guild. He held membership card #10.

=== Cowboy star ===
In 1935, Columbia Pictures wanted to replace its incumbent western star Tim McCoy with a younger actor. Starrett heard about this and interviewed with Columbia producers. Starrett recalled that studio chief Harry Cohn was indifferent, caring about only one thing: "Can he ride a horse?" Starrett could, and got the job. His first western was Gallant Defender (1935). Starrett ultimately signed four contracts with Columbia, becoming the studio's number-one cowboy star. He cast an appealing figure with his tall stature (6' 2"), strong jawline, confident voice, and air of quiet authority.

Starrett hadn't planned on making an entire career out of westerns, and agreed to make them for two years, with the understanding that his bosses would then cast him in plainclothes roles. When they didn't, he walked out on his contract after the two years. "I sat out the waltz one year, thinking I'd like to make a change from westerns. That waltz cost me $60,000 [the dollar value of his original agreement]. But you know when you're raising a family -- I had two young boys, twins -- you can't always do what you want to do... And I think an actor's life is very much like an athlete's. It's youth. You've got to make it while you can. So after that year, I went back and went along with it." Theater exhibitors around the world were attracting big crowds with Charles Starrett westerns, so Columbia gave him a new contract with the actor insisting on appearing in a non-western. He finally got his chance—once—in 1937, for the collegiate musical comedy Start Cheering (released 1938). In a curious reflection of his own situation, Starrett played a disenchanted movie hero who wanted to do something different with his life. But Starrett's success in westerns established him firmly in outdoor fare and sealed his fate professionally. For the rest of his career he made Columbia westerns exclusively.

The musical westerns of Gene Autry inspired every Hollywood studio to have its cowboy personalities use their musical talents—but not Charles Starrett. He could carry a tune but left the songs to professional vocalists (his vocals in Start Cheering were dubbed by Robert Paige). Columbia solved the problem by hiring an entire singing group to support Starrett: the Sons of the Pioneers.

Charles Starrett made two dozen westerns under his new contract, and they tend to resemble each other because the production unit was very close-knit. The same company of technicians and players worked in film after film: almost always Iris Meredith as the leading lady, Dick Curtis as the villain, Hank Bell as the sidekick, Edward LeSaint as the senior character of father, rancher, marshal, etc., and the Sons of the Pioneers as the chorus. Very occasionally, Columbia reassigned Meredith to other productions, so various contract starlets took the ingenue roles, among them Lorna Gray and Ann Doran.

When Starrett's new contract lapsed in July 1940, he withdrew from westerns and Columbia disbanded the unit. Iris Meredith left the studio, and the Sons of the Pioneers moved to Republic Pictures, where they reunited with their former lead singer Roy Rogers.

Again, exhibitors petitioned Columbia for more Charles Starrett westerns, so the studio came through with a new contract at an increased salary. Starrett finally accepted his permanent cowboy status, and returned to Columbia in March 1941 as "The Medico": Steven Monroe, cowboy doctor.

The Medico series lapsed after only three features. Columbia then added former Hopalong Cassidy co-star Russell Hayden and comedian-musician Cliff Edwards to the Starrett company, following the "trigger trio" format popular at the time: three name stars in a western series, like The Three Mesquiteers, The Rough Riders, and The Range Busters. Hayden and Edwards were featured alongside Starrett during the 1941–42 season. Columbia gave Hayden his own starring series in 1942; Edwards left Columbia for RKO to work with Tim Holt.

=== The Durango Kid ===
After playing assorted rancher, ranger, and sheriff roles, Charles Starrett was cast as The Durango Kid in 1940. The character was an upright citizen known and liked by the townsfolk, but he masqueraded as a notorious, black-garbed horseman to terrorize the local criminals and foil their plans. The film was successful but not much different from some of Starrett's earlier good guy-chasing-bad-guy roles.

The character was revived five years later in The Return of the Durango Kid, which caught on very quickly. Starrett played an amiable cowpoke named Steve (the last name varied but he was always Steve to his friends), who would become angered by an injustice and go after the villains as the mysterious, elusive Durango Kid. Steve's paint horse was named "Bullet" and Durango's white horse was "Raider." A follow-up film was made, and then a series. One favorite device became a signature: the masked Durango Kid suddenly materializing like Superman, always catching the villains by surprise. The Durango Kid rejuvenated Charles Starrett's career, winning him a new generation of loyal fans, a new five-year contract, and even a comic-book adaptation, Charles Starrett as the Durango Kid (1949–1955), published by Magazine Enterprises. The film series was also a useful training ground for novice actresses and fashion models, who would be signed to six-month contracts and cast as cowgirls in Starrett westerns.

Dub Taylor, as comic sidekick "Cannonball", worked with Starrett until 1946. At that time, Smiley Burnette, who had been a very popular sidekick to Gene Autry, was brought in to replace Taylor. Burnette, appropriately enough, played a character called "Smiley Burnette." The Durango Kid films combined vigorous action sequences—often with spectacular stunts performed by Ted Mapes and later Jock Mahoney—and western music. Each film featured musical specialties by Burnette, and by a guest artist or group from records or radio.

In 1947 producer Colbert Clark faced a scheduling problem for the film Prairie Raiders and had to borrow scenes from older westerns to coax the running time up to the usual length. Thus Starrett's The Lone Hand Texan (1947) was filmed in nine days, but Prairie Raiders was finished in four. This emergency measure was only temporary, and the series returned to its standard schedule of six to nine days each until 1949, when the series faced a challenge. Production costs kept rising but the financial return was limited, so the budgets were cut. Now, every all-new Durango Kid adventure alternated with a "cheater" that filmed new scenes for about half the picture, and filled out the hour with old scenes from the film library. Sometimes the scripting and editing were very clever. Streets of Ghost Town (1950) was built around chunks from the 1946 westerns Gunning for Vengeance and Landrush, and the new scenes were staged in a deserted town, saving money on supporting actors, extras, stuntmen, sets, and props. In Cyclone Fury (1951), footage from four older Starrett westerns is worked into the plot. The final Durango Kid feature was The Kid from Broken Gun (1952), with the new footage set in a courtroom and the old footage illustrating the testimony of the various characters. Columbia was beginning to use this same recycling gambit in its action serials and Three Stooges comedies.

Charles Starrett retired at age 48, when his last Columbia contract lapsed. As Starrett had once taken over Columbia's westerns from Tim McCoy, Jock Mahoney took over the reins from Starrett, co-starring with Smiley Burnette in a new series under the same producer, Colbert Clark. The pilot feature, which began filming on May 6, 1952, was completed but never released; Columbia abandoned its program Westerns one month later, and Columbia's long history of B westerns ended with Charles Starrett.

Columbia serviced the still-strong demand for Starrett by reissuing his 1937-1940 westerns with the Sons of the Pioneers. These proved just as popular as the Durango series. At the time the studio was so certain of Charles Starrett's continuing appeal that, as reported by columnist Vincent Canby, Columbia "will keep the recently retired cowboy star on the nation's screens for what is conservatively estimated as the next 15 years." Columbia did keep dozens of the older Starrett features in theaters; they were reprinted in 1952, 1955, and 1958, and they remained available from local Columbia exchanges into the 1960s.

== Later years ==
Although his agent, Sam Jaffe, tried to interest movie and TV producers in hiring Starrett, the actor no longer needed or wanted a show-business career; he was independently wealthy from wise investments and his family fortune. In retirement he traveled widely with his wife, favoring tropical islands.

NBC-TV brought the Charles Starrett westerns to network television in 1956, under the program title Cowboy Theater. Starrett himself was approached to host the program, and he liked the idea but disapproved of the logistics: he would have to appear live in the studio every Saturday afternoon, and the studio was in New York City. Starrett, long established as a California resident, was understandably reluctant to commute across the country every week, and asked if his segments could be filmed in California. The network said no, because the show was to be broadcast live from New York, along the lines of NBC's popular Howdy Doody show under the same producer, Bob Rippen. Cowboy Theater went on with another host, Monty Hall, then a new face on American television. Cowboy Theater premiered on Saturday, September 15, 1956, at 12 noon Eastern time, and the first episode was a slightly edited version of Starrett's first Columbia feature, Gallant Defender (1935). The Starrett series ran for almost seven months, through March 9, 1957. Later that year, NBC revived Cowboy Theater as a Sunday-evening summertime series. This edition of the show did without a live host, presenting only the films; some of them were the 1941-42 theatrical series starring Charles Starrett and featuring Russell Hayden and Cliff Edwards. The revived Cowboy Theater ran from June 30 to September 15, 1957, at 6:30 p.m. Eastern time.

Charles Starrett's fans never forgot him, and corresponded with him in later years. Starrett was pleased by the interest and made guest appearances at a few film conventions and revivals.

== Death ==
Starrett died of cancer in Borrego Springs, California, on March 22, 1986, six days short of his 83rd birthday.

== Selected filmography ==
- Fast and Loose (1930)
- The Royal Family of Broadway (1930)
- Damaged Love (1931)
- The Viking (1931)
- Silence (1931)
- The Age for Love (1931)
- Touchdown (1931)
- Sky Bride (1932)
- Lady and Gent (1932)
- The Mask of Fu Manchu (1933)
- Jungle Bride (1933)
- Our Betters (1933)
- The Return of Casey Jones (1933)
- The Sweetheart of Sigma Chi (1933)
- Murder on the Campus (1933)
- Mr. Skitch (1933)
- Stolen Sweets (1934)
- Three on a Honeymoon (1934)
- This Man Is Mine (1934)
- Green Eyes (1934)
- Call It Luck (1934)
- Desirable (1934)
- Gentlemen Are Born (1934)
- Undercover Men (1934)
- The Silver Streak (1934)
- Sons of Steel (1934)
- A Shot in the Dark (1935)
- One New York Night (1935)
- One in a Million (1935)
- What Price Crime (1935)
- So Red the Rose (1935)
- Make a Million (1935)
- Gallant Defender (1935)
- The Mysterious Avenger (1936)
- Secret Patrol (1936)
- Code of the Range (1936)
- Along Came Love (1936)
- The Cowboy Star (1936)
- Stampede (1936)
- Dodge City Trail (1936)
- Westbound Mail (1937)
- Trapped (1937)
- Two Gun Law (1937)
- Two-Fisted Sheriff (1937)
- One Man Justice (1937)
- The Old Wyoming Trail (1937)
- Outlaws of the Prairie (1937)
- Cattle Raiders (1938)
- Start Cheering (1938)
- Call of the Rockies (1938)
- Law of the Plains (1938)
- West of Cheyenne (1938)
- South of Arizona (1938)
- The Colorado Trail (1938)
- West of the Santa Fe (1938)
- Rio Grande (1938)
- The Thundering West (1939)
- Texas Stampede (1939)
- North of the Yukon (1939)
- Spoilers of the Range (1939)
- Western Caravans (1939)
- The Man from Sundown (1939)
- Riders of Black River (1939)
- Outpost of the Mounties (1939)
- The Stranger from Texas (1939)
- Two-Fisted Rangers (1939)
- Bullets for Rustlers (1940)
- Blazing Six Shooters (1940)
- Texas Stagecoach (1940)
- The Durango Kid (1940) 1st Durango Kid film
- West of Abilene (1940)
- Thundering Frontier (1940)
- The Pinto Kid (1941)
- Outlaws of the Panhandle (1941)
- The Medico of Painted Springs (1941)
- Thunder Over the Prairie (1941)
- Prairie Stranger (1941)
- The Royal Mounted Patrol (1941)
- Riders of the Badlands (1941)
- West of Tombstone (1942)
- Lawless Plainsmen (1942)
- Down Rio Grande Way (1942)
- Riders of the Northland (1942)
- Bad Men of the Hills (1942)
- Overland to Deadwood (1942)
- Riding Through Nevada (1942)
- Pardon My Gun (1942)
- The Fighting Buckaroo (1943)
- Law of the Northwest (1943)
- Frontier Fury (1943)
- Robin Hood of the Range (1943)
- Hail to the Rangers (1943)
- Cowboy in the Clouds (1943)
- Cowboy Canteen (1944)
- Sundown Valley (1944)
- Riding West (1944)
- Cowboy from Lonesome River (1944)
- Cyclone Prairie Rangers (1944)
- Saddle Leather Law (1944)

The Durango Kid series

- The Return of the Durango Kid (1945) sequel to The Durango Kid; from this film forward, Starrett played The Durango Kid exclusively
- Both Barrels Blazing (1945)
- Sagebrush Heroes (1945)
- Rough Ridin' Justice (1945)
- Rustlers of the Badlands (1945)
- Outlaws of the Rockies (1945)
- Blazing the Western Trail (1945)
- Lawless Empire (1945)
- Texas Panhandle (1945)
- Frontier Gunlaw (1946)
- Roaring Rangers (1946)
- Gunning for Vengeance (1946)
- Galloping Thunder (1946)
- Two-Fisted Stranger (1946)
- The Desert Horseman (1946)
- Heading West (1946)
- Landrush (1946)
- Terror Trail (1946)
- The Fighting Frontiersman (1946)
- South of the Chisholm Trail (1947)
- The Lone Hand Texan (1947)
- West of Dodge City (1947)
- Law of the Canyon (1947)
- Prairie Raiders (1947)
- The Stranger from Ponca City (1947)
- Riders of the Lone Star (1947)
- Buckaroo from Powder River (1947)
- Last Days of Boot Hill (1947)
- Six-Gun Law (1948)
- Phantom Valley (1948)
- West of Sonora (1948)
- Whirlwind Raiders (1948)
- Blazing Across the Pecos (1948)
- Trail to Laredo (1948)
- El Dorado Pass (1948)
- Quick on the Trigger (1948)
- Challenge of the Range (1949)
- Desert Vigilante (1949)
- Laramie (1949)
- The Blazing Trail (1949)
- South of Death Valley (1949)
- Bandits of El Dorado (1949)
- Horsemen of the Sierras (1949)
- Renegades of the Sage (1949)
- Trail of the Rustlers (1950)
- Outcast of Black Mesa (1950)
- Texas Dynamo (1950)
- Streets of Ghost Town (1950)
- Across the Badlands (1950)
- Raiders of Tomahawk Creek (1950)
- Frontier Outpost (1950)
- Lightning Guns (1950)
- Prairie Roundup (1951)
- Pecos River (1951)
- Ridin' the Outlaw Trail (1951)
- Fort Savage Raiders (1951)
- Snake River Desperadoes (1951)
- Bonanza Town (1951)
- Cyclone Fury (1951)
- The Kid from Amarillo (1951)
- Smoky Canyon (1952)
- The Hawk of Wild River (1952)
- Laramie Mountains (1952)
- The Rough, Tough West (1952)
- Junction City (1952)
- The Kid from Broken Gun (1952)
