= Gunning for Vengeance =

1946 film

- Theatrical poster for the film
- Directed by: Ray Nazarro
- Screenplay by: Louise Rousseau; Ed Earl Repp
- Story by: Louise Rousseau
- Produced by: Colbert Clark
- Starring: Charles Starrett; Marjean Neville; The Trailsmen
- Cinematography: George Kelley
- Edited by: Al Clark; Paul Borofsky
- Production company: Columbia Pictures
- Release date: March 21, 1946 (US)
- Running time: 54 minutes
- Country: United States
- Language: English

Gunning for Vengeance is a 1946 American Western film directed by Ray Nazarro, which stars Charles Starrett, Marjean Neville, and The Trailsmen. This was the eleventh of 65 films in the Durango Kid series.

== Cast ==
- Charles Starrett as Steve Landry aka The Durango Kid
- Marjean Neville as Elaine Jenkins
- The Trailsmen
- Smiley Burnette as himself
- Robert Kortman as Curley
- George Chesebro as Mike
- Frank LaRue as Mayor Garry
- Lane Chandler as Jim Clayburn
- Phyllis Adair as Belle Madden
- Robert Williams as Shorty
- Jack Kirk as Leader
- Nolan Leary as Jenkins
- Frank Fanning as Dr. Hawkins
