= Law of the Canyon =

1947 film by Ray Nazarro

- Theatrical release poster
- Directed by: Ray Nazarro
- Screenplay by: Eileen Gary
- Produced by: Colbert Clark
- Starring: Charles Starrett; Nancy Saunders; Robert 'Buzz' Henry; Texas Jim Lewis; Smiley Burnette
- Cinematography: George F. Kelley
- Edited by: Burton Kramer
- Production company: Columbia Pictures
- Distributed by: Columbia Pictures
- Release date: April 24, 1947
- Running time: 56 minutes
- Country: United States
- Language: English

Law of the Canyon is a 1947 American Western film directed by Ray Nazarro and written by Eileen Gary. The film stars Charles Starrett, Nancy Saunders, Robert 'Buzz' Henry, Texas Jim Lewis and Smiley Burnette. The film was released on April 24, 1947, by Columbia Pictures. This was the twenty-second of 65 films in the Durango Kid series.

== Cast ==
- Charles Starrett as Steve Langtry / The Durango Kid
- Nancy Saunders as Mary Coleman
- Robert 'Buzz' Henry as Spike Coleman
- Texas Jim Lewis as Guitar Player
- Smiley Burnette as Smiley
- Fred F. Sears as Dr. Middleton
- George Chesebro as Sheriff Coleman
- Edmund Cobb as T. D. Wilson
- Zon Murray as Fletcher
- Jack Kirk as Ben
