= Landrush =

1946 film

- Theatrical release poster
- Directed by: Vernon Keays
- Screenplay by: Michael L. Simmons
- Produced by: Colbert Clark
- Starring: Charles Starrett; Doris Houck; Smiley Burnette; Emmett Lynn; Bud Geary; Steve Barclay
- Cinematography: George Meehan
- Edited by: James Sweeney
- Production company: Columbia Pictures
- Distributed by: Columbia Pictures
- Release date: November 18, 1946
- Running time: 53 minutes
- Country: United States
- Language: English

Landrush is a 1946 American Western film directed by Vernon Keays and starring Charles Starrett, Doris Houck, Smiley Burnette, Emmett Lynn, Bud Geary and Steve Barclay. The film was released on November 18, 1946, by Columbia Pictures. This was the sixteenth of 65 films in the Durango Kid series.

== Cast ==
- Charles Starrett as Steve Harmon / The Durango Kid
- Doris Houck as Mary Parker
- Smiley Burnette as Smiley Burnette
- Emmett Lynn as Jake Parker
- Bud Geary as Claw Hawkins
- Steve Barclay as Caleb Garvey
- Bob Kortman as Sackett
- George Chesebro as Bill
- Bud Osborne as Sheriff Jim Collins
