= The Lone Hand Texan =

1947 film by Ray Nazarro

- Theatrical release poster
- Directed by: Ray Nazarro
- Screenplay by: Ed Earl Repp
- Produced by: Colbert Clark
- Starring: Charles Starrett; Mustard; Gravy; Smiley Burnette; John Cason; George Chesebro
- Cinematography: George F. Kelley
- Edited by: Paul Borofsky
- Music by: Walter Greene
- Production company: Columbia Pictures
- Distributed by: Columbia Pictures
- Release date: March 6, 1947
- Running time: 54 minutes
- Country: United States
- Language: English

The Lone Hand Texan is a 1947 American Western musical film directed by Ray Nazarro and starring Charles Starrett, Mustard, Gravy, Smiley Burnette, John Cason, and George Chesebro. The film was released by Columbia Pictures on March 6, 1947. This was the twentieth of 65 films in the Durango Kid series.

== Cast ==
- Charles Starrett as Steve Driscoll / The Durango Kid
- Mustard as Musician Mustard (as Mustard and Gravy)
- Gravy as Musician Gravy (as Mustard and Gravy)
- Smiley Burnette as Smiley Burnette
- John Cason as Henchman (uncredited)
- George Chesebro as Scanlon (uncredited)
- Jim Diehl as Strawboss (uncredited)
- Art Dillard as J.E. Clark aka Lefty (uncredited)
- Herman Hack as Well Worker (uncredited)
- Robert Kellard as Boomer Kildea (uncredited)
- Mary Newton as Mrs. Clarabelle Adams (uncredited)
- Maudie Prickett as Hattie Hatfield (uncredited)
- Raider as Durango's Horse (uncredited)
- Matty Roubert as Henchman (uncredited)
- George Russell as Henchman (uncredited)
- Fred F. Sears as Sam Jason (uncredited)
- Charles Soldani as Wildcatter Pledging Money (uncredited)
- Jasper Weldon as Stagecoach Driver (uncredited)
- Blackie Whiteford as Well Worker (uncredited)
