= West of Dodge City =

1947 film by Ray Nazarro

- Theatrical release poster
- Directed by: Ray Nazarro
- Screenplay by: Bert Horswell
- Produced by: Colbert Clark
- Starring: Charles Starrett; Nancy Saunders; Mustard; Gravy; Smiley Burnette
- Cinematography: George F. Kelley
- Edited by: Paul Borofsky
- Production company: Columbia Pictures
- Distributed by: Columbia Pictures
- Release date: March 27, 1947
- Running time: 57 minutes
- Country: United States
- Language: English

West of Dodge City is a 1947 American Western film directed by Ray Nazarro and written by Bert Horswell. The film stars Charles Starrett, Nancy Saunders, Mustard, Gravy and Smiley Burnette. The film was released on March 27, 1947, by Columbia Pictures. This was the twenty-first of 65 films in the Durango Kid series.

== Cast ==
- Charles Starrett as Steve Ramsey / The Durango Kid
- Nancy Saunders as Anne Avery
- Mustard as Mustard
- Gravy as Gravy
- Smiley Burnette as Smiley Burnette
- Fred F. Sears as Henry Hardison
- Glenn Stuart as Danny Avery
- I. Stanford Jolley as Borger
- George Chesebro as Hod Barker
- Robert J. Wilke as Adams
- Nolan Leary as John Avery
- Steve Clark as Sheriff
- Zon Murray as Dirk
- Marshall Reed as Flint
- Tom Chatterton as Officer manager
- Bud Osborne as Stage driver
