= Nancy Saunders =

American actress (1925–2020)

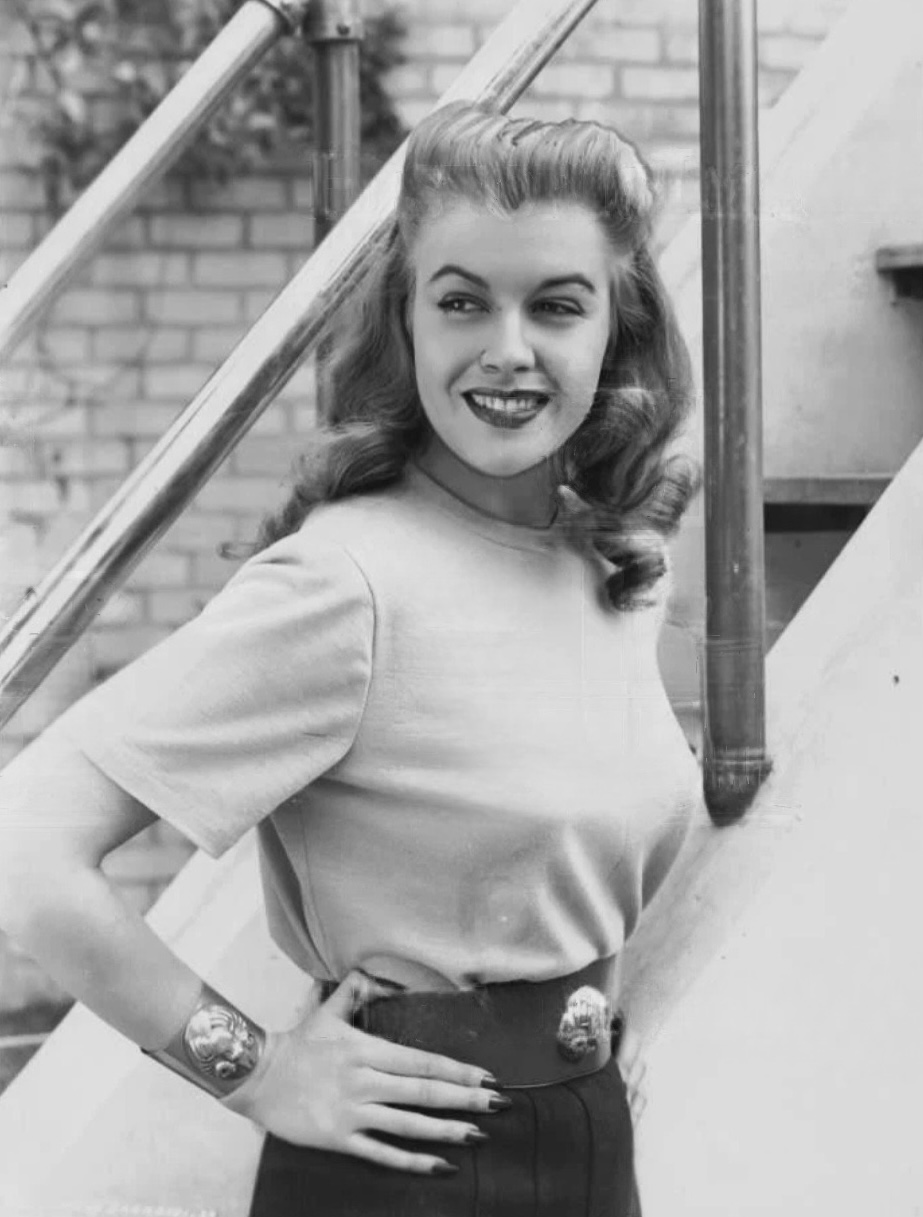
- Saunders in 1947
- Born: Nancy Lou Sanders; June 29, 1925; Los Angeles, California, U.S.
- Died: June 13, 2020 (aged 94); Mission Viejo, California, U.S.
- Occupation: Actress
- Years active: 1946–2011
- Spouse: Ray Russell Davioni (m. 1946; ann. 1947)

Nancy Lou Saunders (June 29, 1925 – June 13, 2020) was an American actress of film, television and the stage.

== Career ==
Saunders appeared in over 20 films between 1946 and 1957. She was discovered when a talent scout was looking for attractive actresses who could ride a horse.

Saunders was a contract actress first with RKO Pictures and later with Columbia Pictures.

To modern viewers, Saunders is known for her roles in several Three Stooges films from the Shemp Howard era, specifically I'm a Monkey's Uncle (and its remake Stone Age Romeos) and as Lady Godiva in The Ghost Talks.

Saunders entered the "Queen" competition at the 1972 All American Quarter Horse Congress.

== Personal life ==
Saunders was born in Hollywood, Los Angeles in June 1925. In December 1946, Saunders married used-car dealer Ray Russell Davioni in Las Vegas. The marriage was annulled in August 1947.

She died from leukemia in Mission Viejo, California in June 2020 at the age of 94.

== Selected filmography ==
- The Bamboo Blonde (1946) as glamour girl
- Lady Luck (1946) as manicurist
- The Secret of the Whistler (1946) as girl
- Slappily Married (1946) as bellhop
- Criminal Court (1946) as secretary
- The Locket (1946) as Miss Wyatt - Blair's secretary
- South of the Chisholm Trail (1946) as Nora Grant
- The Thirteenth Hour (1947) as Donna
- West of Dodge City (1947) as Anne Avery
- A Likely Story (1947) as blonde on train
- Law of the Canyon (1947) as Mary Coleman
- The Millerson Case (1947) as Belle Englehart
- Prairie Raiders (1947) as Ann Bradford
- The Woman on the Beach (1947) as girl at party
- Brideless Groom (1947) as former girlfriend
- When a Girl's Beautiful (1947) as Sue Dennis, model
- Her Husband's Affairs (1947) as nurse
- The Lone Wolf in London (1947) as Ann Klemscott
- It Had to Be You (1947) as Nancy, the model
- Six-Gun Law (1948) as June Wallace
- Prairie Raiders (1949) as Ann Bradford
- Outlaw Country (1949) as Jane Evans
- Arizona Territory (1949) as Doris Devan
- Mrs. O'Malley and Mr. Malone (1950) as Joanie
