= Derwin Abrahams =

American film director

- Born: August 17, 1903; New York City, U.S.
- Died: November 5, 1974 (aged 71); Yolo County, California, U.S.
- Other name: Derwin M. Abbe
- Occupation: Director
- Years active: 1941–1959

Derwin Abrahams (August 17, 1903 – November 5, 1974) was an American film director. He directed four serials in the 1940s for Columbia Pictures, including Hop Harrigan, Chick Carter, Detective, Tex Granger, and Son of the Guardsman, followed by The Great Adventures of Captain Kidd in 1953.

Abrahams's directoral debut was Border Vigilantes (1941). He directed around two dozen western features, as well as episodes of the TV series The Adventures of Kit Carson, Hopalong Cassidy and The Cisco Kid.

Abraham was a film editor on Harry Sherman's staff.

== Selected filmography ==
- Texas Rifles (1944)
- Northwest Trail (1945)
- Both Barrels Blazing (1945)
- Rustlers of the Badlands (1945)
- Drifting Along (1946)
- South of the Chisholm Trail (1947)
- Docks of New Orleans (1948)
- The Girl from San Lorenzo (1950)
- Whistling Hills (1951)
