= Paul Borofsky =

Russian-American film editor (1901–65)

- Born: November 11, 1901; Moscow, Russian Empire
- Died: October 2, 1965 (aged 63); Los Angeles, California; United States
- Occupation: Editor
- Years active: 1941–1958 (film)

Paul Borofsky (November 11, 1901 – October 2, 1965) was a Russian-born American film editor.

== Selected filmography ==
- Dangerous Mists (1944)
- Sailor's Holiday (1944)
- The Missing Juror (1944)
- Gunning for Vengeance (1946)
- Lone Star Moonlight (1946)
- The Lone Hand Texan (1947)
- West of Dodge City (1947)
- Phantom Valley (1948)
- Challenge of the Range (1949)
- The Blazing Trail (1949)
- Laramie (1949)
- Trail of the Rustlers (1950)
- Lightning Guns (1950)
- The Kid from Amarillo (1951)
- Ridin' the Outlaw Trail (1951)
- Bonanza Town (1951)
- Pecos River (1951)
- Smoky Canyon (1952)
- Junction City (1952)
- Laramie Mountains (1952)
- The Rough, Tough West (1952)

== Bibliography ==
- Pitts, Michael R. Western Film Series of the Sound Era. McFarland, 2009.
