= Uncle Tom's Cabin (disambiguation) =

Uncle Tom's Cabin is an anti-slavery novel by Harriet Beecher Stowe.

Uncle Tom's Cabin may also refer to:

== Film ==
- Uncle Tom's Cabin (1903 film), an American silent short drama
- Uncle Tom's Cabin (1910 Thanhouser film), an American silent short drama produced by the Thanhouser Company
- Uncle Tom's Cabin (1910 Vitagraph film), an American silent short drama produced by Vitagraph Studios
- Uncle Tom's Cabin (1914 film), an American silent historical drama film
- Uncle Tom's Cabin (1918 film), an American silent drama film
- Uncle Tom's Cabin (1927 film), a silent film by Harry A. Pollard
- Uncle Tom's Cabin (1965 film), a film by Géza von Radványi
- Uncle Tom's Cabin (1987 film), a television film featuring Avery Brooks

== Other uses ==
- "Uncle Tom's Cabin" (song), a 1990 song by Warrant from Cherry Pie
- Uncle Tom's Cabin Historic Site, an open-air museum and African American history centre near Dresden, Ontario, Canada
- Uncle Tom's Cabin, a pub in Wincanton, Somerset, England
- Uncle Tom's Cabin, a pub in Dundrum, Dublin, Republic of Ireland
- Riley-Bolten House, known locally as Uncle Tom's Cabin

== See also ==
- A Key to Uncle Tom's Cabin by Harriet Beecher Stowe
- Film adaptations of Uncle Tom's Cabin
- Onkel Toms Hütte (Berlin U-Bahn), a U-Bahn station
- Tom Shows, stage productions based on Uncle Tom's Cabin
- Uncle Tom, a pejorative term for a black person who is perceived as behaving subserviently to white authority
