= Film adaptations of Uncle Tom's Cabin =

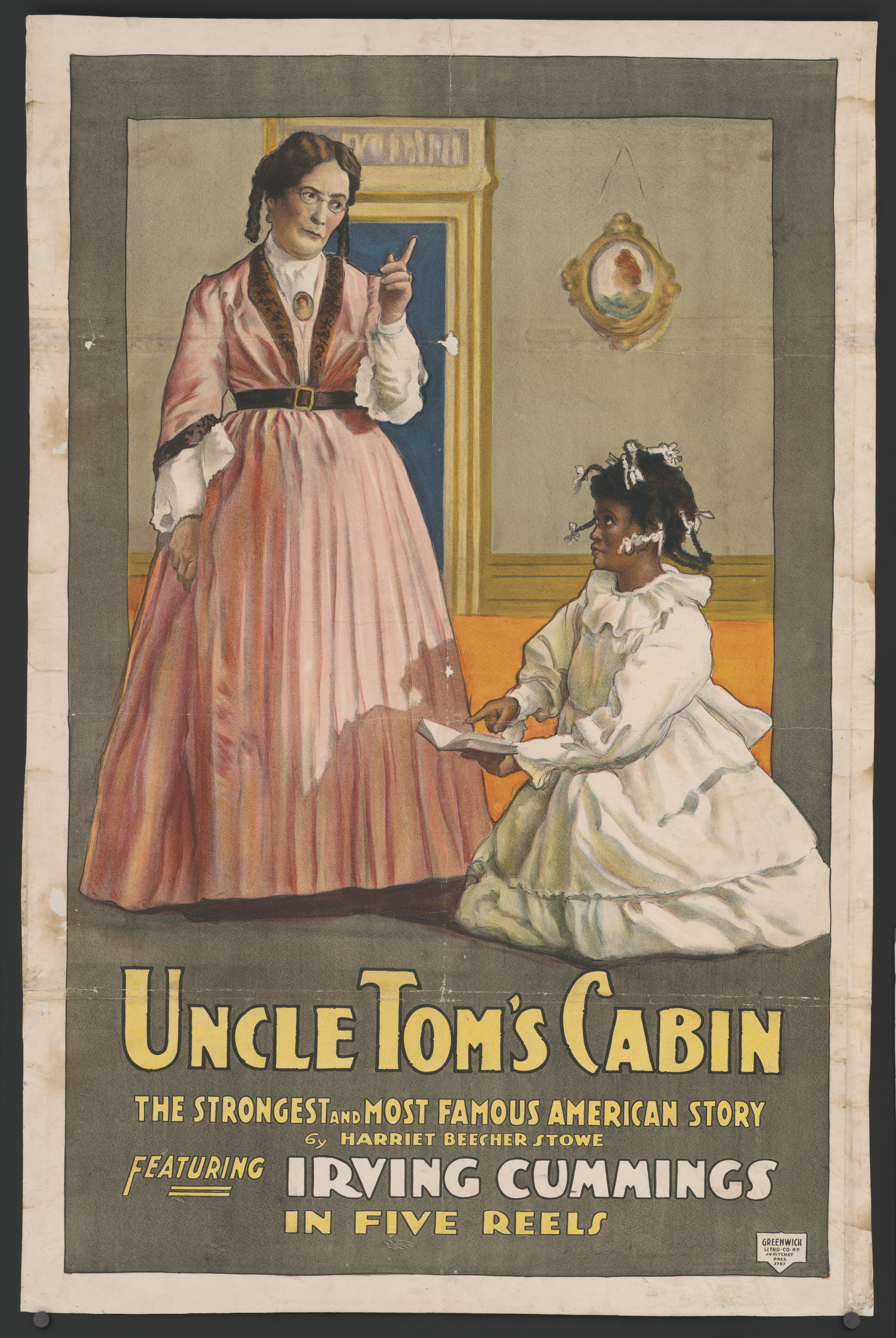
Poster for the World Film Company production of Uncle Tom's Cabin (1914), part of the National Film Registry

A number of film adaptations of Harriet Beecher Stowe's 1852 novel Uncle Tom's Cabin have been made over the years. Most of these movies were created during the silent film era (with Uncle Tom's Cabin being the most-filmed story of that time period). Since the 1930s, Hollywood studios have considered the story too controversial for another adaptation (although one foreign film and a made-for-TV movie have been created). Characters, themes and plot elements from Uncle Tom's Cabin have also influenced a large number of other movies, including The Birth of a Nation (1915), while also inspiring numerous animated cartoons.

== Silent film versions ==
Edwin S. Porter's 1903 version of Uncle Tom's Cabin, which was one of the first "full length" movies.

Uncle Tom's Cabin was the most-filmed story of the silent film era with at least nine known adaptations between 1903 – 1927. This popularity was due to the continuing popularity of both the book and "Tom shows", meaning audiences were already familiar with the characters and the plot, making it easier for the film to be understood without spoken words.

- A 1903 version of Uncle Tom's Cabin, directed by Edwin S. Porter was one of the earliest "full-length" movies (although "full-length" at that time meant between 10 and 14 minutes). This film, produced by the Edison Manufacturing Company, used white actors in blackface in the major roles and black performers only as extras. This version was evidently similar to many of the "Tom Shows" of earlier decades and featured a large number of black stereotypes (such as having the slaves dance in almost any context, including at a slave auction). It was the most expensive film production ever at the time of its production.
- Another film version from 1903 was directed by Siegmund Lubin and starred Lubin as Simon Legree. While no copies of Lubin's film still exist, according to accounts the movie was similar to Porter's version and reused the sets and costumes from a "Tom Show."
- In 1910, a 3-Reel Vitagraph Company of America production was directed by J. Stuart Blackton and adapted by Eugene Mullin. According to The Dramatic Mirror, this film was "a decided innovation" in motion pictures and "the first time an American company" released a dramatic film in 3 reels. Until then, "full-length" movies of the time were 15 minutes long and contained only one reel of film. The movie starred Florence Turner, Mary Fuller, Edwin R. Phillips, Flora Finch, Genevieve Tobin, and Carlyle Blackwell Sr.
- Another 1910 version by the Thanhouser Company was directed by Barry O'Neil, starred Frank Hall Crane as Uncle Tom, Anna Rosemond as Eliza, Marie Eline as Little Eva, and Grace Eline as Topsy.
- A 1913 release was directed by Otis Turner and adapted by Allan Dwan. It starred Edward Alexander, Margarita Fischer, Harry A. Pollard, Iva Shepard and Gertrude Short.
- Another 1913 release was directed by Sidney Olcott and starred Anna Q. Nilsson.
- A 1914 version was directed by William Robert Daly. It was adapted Edward McWade from the play adaptation by George L. Aiken. It starred Sam Lucas, Teresa Michelena, Marie Eline (again), Royce D. Applegate and Boots Wall. This was the first "white" film to have an African-American star. This version was added to the National Film Registry in 2012.
- The Birth of a Nation (1915) deliberately used a cabin similar to Uncle Tom's home in the film's dramatic climax, where several white Southerners unite with their former enemy (Yankee soldiers) to defend what the film's caption says is their "Aryan birthright." According to scholars, this reuse of such a familiar cabin would have resonated with, and been understood by, audiences of the time.
- A 1918 version was directed and adapted by J. Searle Dawley. It starred Marguerite Clark (as both Little Eva and Topsy), Sam Hardy, Florence Carpenter, Frank Losee and Walter P. Lewis. It is now considered to be a lost film.
- A 1927 version was directed by Harry A. Pollard (who'd played Uncle Tom in the 1913 release of Uncle Tom's Cabin). This two-hour movie spent more than a year in production and was the third most expensive picture of the silent era (at a cost of $1.8 million). Black actor Charles Gilpin was originally cast in the title role, but was fired after the studio decided his "portrayal was too aggressive." James B. Lowe then took over the character of Tom. One difference in this film from the novel is that after Tom dies, he returns as a vengeful spirit and confronts Simon Legree before leading the slave owner to his death. Black media outlets of the time praised the film, but the studio—fearful of a backlash from Southern and white film audiences—ended up cutting out controversial scenes, including the film's opening at a slave auction (where a mother is torn away from her baby). The story was adapted by Pollard, Harvey F. Thew and A.P. Younger, with titles by Walter Anthony. It starred James B. Lowe, Virginia Grey, George Siegmann, Margarita Fischer, Mona Ray and Madame Sul-Te-Wan.

== Cartoons ==
A number of animated short films have parodied characters, plots, and themes from Uncle Tom's Cabin. Most of them are withheld from circulation due to the exaggerated and stereotypical depictions of African-American people.

- Walt Disney Productions' Mickey's Mellerdrammer (1933) features Mickey Mouse performing the play in blackface with exaggerated, orange lips.
- Harman-Ising Productions' The Old Plantation (1935) is an abridged adaptation with mechanical toys.
- Leon Schlesinger Productions' Uncle Tom's Bungalow (1937) is an abridged adaptation and parody of the book. Directed by Tex Avery, it is infamous for being part of the Censored Eleven, 11 cartoons produced by the studio that were acquired and barred from release by United Artists.
- Terrytoons' Eliza on Ice integrates the novel's plot into the typical Mighty Mouse formula.
- Metro-Goldwyn-Mayer's Uncle Tom's Cabaña (1947) is a spiritual successor to Uncle Tom's Bungalow, also directed by Avery and remains out of circulation.
- A gag in Southern Fried Rabbit (1953) involves Bugs Bunny disguising himself as Uncle Tom and singing "My Old Kentucky Home" in order to cross the Mason–Dixon line.

== Cinematic mentions and later films ==
A number of movies have utilized characters, plots, and themes from Uncle Tom's Cabin, including An Uncle Tom's Cabin Troupe (1913); the Duncan Sisters' Topsy and Eva (1927); "Uncle Tom's Uncle," a 1926 Our Gang episode which has the kids creating their own "Tom Show" and 1938's Everybody Sing (which features Judy Garland in blackface). But for several decades after the end of the silent film era, the subject matter of Stowe's novel was judged too sensitive for further film interpretation. In 1946, Metro-Goldwyn-Mayer considered filming the story, but ceased production after protests led by the National Association for the Advancement of Colored People.

- Dimples, a 1936 Shirley Temple film, is a humorous look at the opening night of the 1853 play version of Uncle Tom's Cabin in New York. The film's last scene features a minstrel show starring Temple and Stepin Fetchit.
- In the final scene of the Abbott and Costello film The Naughty Nineties (1945), Costello is seen comically in drag as Little Eva in a showboat performance of the novel. He "ascends" to Heaven on a wire that gets caught.
- A highlight of the Rodgers and Hammerstein musical The King and I (1951) is a ballet, "Small House of Uncle Thomas", in traditional Siamese style which has been organized by Tuptim, on the subversive theme of Eliza's escape.
- A German-language version under the title Onkel Toms Hütte, appeared in 1965, directed by Géza von Radványi (1907-1986). It was screened in the United States by exploitation film presenter Kroger Babb.
- A Cabana do Pai Tomás was a 1969-70 Brazilian television serial adaptation of the Harriet Beecher Stowe story.
- A 1971 Italian pseudo-documentary film called Goodbye Uncle Tom recreated historical events from the slave era. It was generally thought at the time to be exploitive and racist.
- Uncle Tom no Koya (1977), an abridged Japanese anime adaptation featured in an episode of anthology series Manga Fairy Tales of the World.
- The most recent film version was a television broadcast in 1987 directed by Stan Lathan and adapted by John Gay. It starred Avery Brooks, Phylicia Rashad, Edward Woodward, Jenny Lewis, Bruce Dern, Samuel L. Jackson and Endyia Kinney.
- In Gangs of New York (2002), Leonardo DiCaprio and Daniel Day-Lewis's characters attend an imagined wartime adaptation of Uncle Tom's Cabin with a deus ex machina ending. An actor portraying Abraham Lincoln is suspended in mid-air as he speaks consolingly to the blackface actors portraying Stowe's characters. The nativist audience members respond by shouting racist epithets, throwing objects at "Lincoln," and rioting to calls of "Down with the Union!" (Gangs of New York, the film, took great liberties with its source, Gangs of New York, the book, so much so that the book is not officially acknowledged.)
- In a deleted scene of the Indian film Rang De Basanti (India's official entry to the Oscar 2007), Indian revolutionaries are shown opting to watch the film while they were starving.

== Evolution of Uncle Tom's Cabin in film ==
Edwin S. Porter's 1903 film production, Uncle Tom’s Cabin; or, Slavery Days, was based largely off of the theatrical productions of the same story common during that time. The movie lived up to racial stereotypes in wide circulation, and scenes were included to showcase slave dances. While African-American extras made appearances, white actors in blackface played the main slave characters. The film storyline strays widely from the plot of the novel, as exemplified by a scene completely independent of the novel depicting a steamboat race. The film assumes the audience is generally familiar with the plot due to the story's long running popularity.

Universal Studio's 1927 release of Uncle Tom’s Cabin was an epic film and a step forward for Stowe's work. While certain stigmatic similarities remained, such as scenes depicting outlandish slave dances and Topsy's flamboyant unruliness, this version was less outmoded in its characterization of slaves. More than earlier adaptations, this film took care to accurately follow the book, and some lines in the movie are direct quotes from the text. Integral characters omitted from previous films were brought to the forefront, such as George Harris. While the overall story remained intact, the writers did take some liberties. For instance, after escaping to freedom, Eliza and Harry are captured by the lawyer Marks and runaway slave tracker Tom Loker and sold down the river as opposed to receiving aid from kindly Quakers. Harry is separated from his mother when purchased by a nameless slave-owner before eventually being reunited with his father. Eliza is sold off to Simon Legree at the same auction as Uncle Tom. This alteration omits the entire subplot involving the Harris family's escape to Canada, weaving the story into one coherent plot. Another twist in the storyline occurs when Union soldiers on the march through the south liberate hundreds of slaves along the way, including the residents of Legree's plantation. The director moved the story forward historically to capitalize on the public's patriotic sympathies.

Socially, this film was more progressive than previous versions. Fewer characters were portrayed in blackface (Topsy is an outstanding exception) and less of an emphasis was put on exotic slave customs. Still, the majority of the screen time is dedicated to the white actors. African American actor James B. Lowe played the character Uncle Tom, but was on screen for less than 9 minutes and speaks less than a dozen lines.

== See also ==
- List of films featuring slavery
