= Matty Roubert =

American male actor

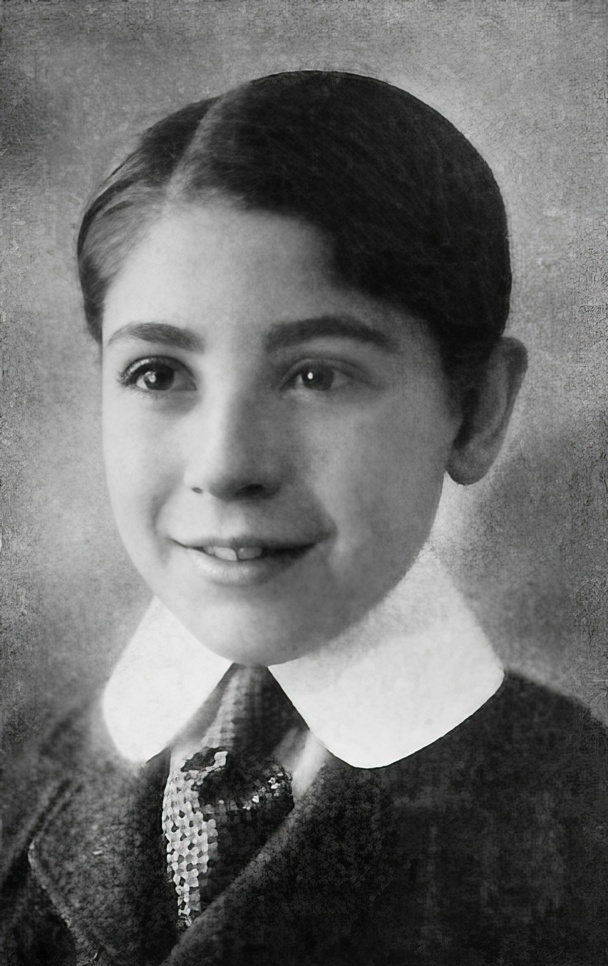
- Roubert at twelve years old
- Born: Matthew Roubert; January 22, 1907; Manhattan, New York
- Died: May 17, 1973 (aged 66); Honolulu, Hawaii
- Occupation: Actor
- Known for: The Universal Boy

Matthew "Matty" Roubert (January 22, 1907 – May 17, 1973) was an American actor, who started out as a child actor working in silent films. As an adult, he mainly worked in B movie western films. Roubert made his film debut at the age of two in Uncle Tom's Cabin

At the age of seven, The Universal Company hired Roubert to star in a series of short films as "The Universal Boy", who visited many prominent people and celebrities. When he was twelve, Reelcraft Picture Company cast him in the Romances of Youth series, which were marketed to a wider audience. Roubert was inducted into the Young Hollywood Hall of Fame in 1913.

== Biography ==
Matty Roubert was born on January 22, 1907, in Manhattan, New York to William and Rachel Roubert. His father was an actor and director, and his mother was a member of the Powers Motion Picture Company. Roubert made his film debut at the age of two in Uncle Tom's Cabin His father also established a production company, named after his son, Matty Roubert Productions, which produced Heritage.

== Career ==
Roubert first appeared in films for Vitagraph and Biograph before starring in comedies for Pat Powers. He was frequently featured alongside Baby Early. They were known as the "Powers Kids". In 1914, the Universal company hired him to star in a series of short films, and he was known as the Universal Boy. In 1920, Reelcraft Picture Company cast him in several short films known as the Romance of Youth series. As an adult, he starred primarily in western films, sometimes working as a stunt double. Roubert has over 140 credits as an actor.

In 1917, while directing Roubert in Parentage, Hobart Henley remarked that Roubert was "probably the greatest boy actor in the industry" at that time. Henley said he didn't bother with costumes or make-up for the actor, because he "wanted him just as he found him, just as he looked when he went to school each day". Film historian Anthony Slide suggested that during the 1910s, there were more children on the screen than at any other period in film history, with Roubert being one of the most prominent. When he turned 18, Roubert recalled working with Norma Talmadge and Mary Pickford before they became well known, and D. W. Griffith directed him in the first two-reeler he made. Roubert also starred in the first three-reeler made in the United States.

== Personal life ==
In 1924, he was dating Thelma Salter, who he had starred with in several productions when they were child actors. That same year, Roubert also told the Los Angeles Times, that when he was a boy, he once had lunch with Theodore Roosevelt, after he climbed on the running board of Roosevelt's car. In 1934, he married Helen Gutierrez, while living in Hollywood. She appeared in several Community Playhouse productions. In 1936, Roubert and his wife traveled to Tahiti, where they lived for six months. By 1973, Roubert was living in Honolulu, Hawaii, where he died in May 1973.

== Filmography ==
Clip from Uncle Tom's Cabin, featuring Roubert in his debut at two years old

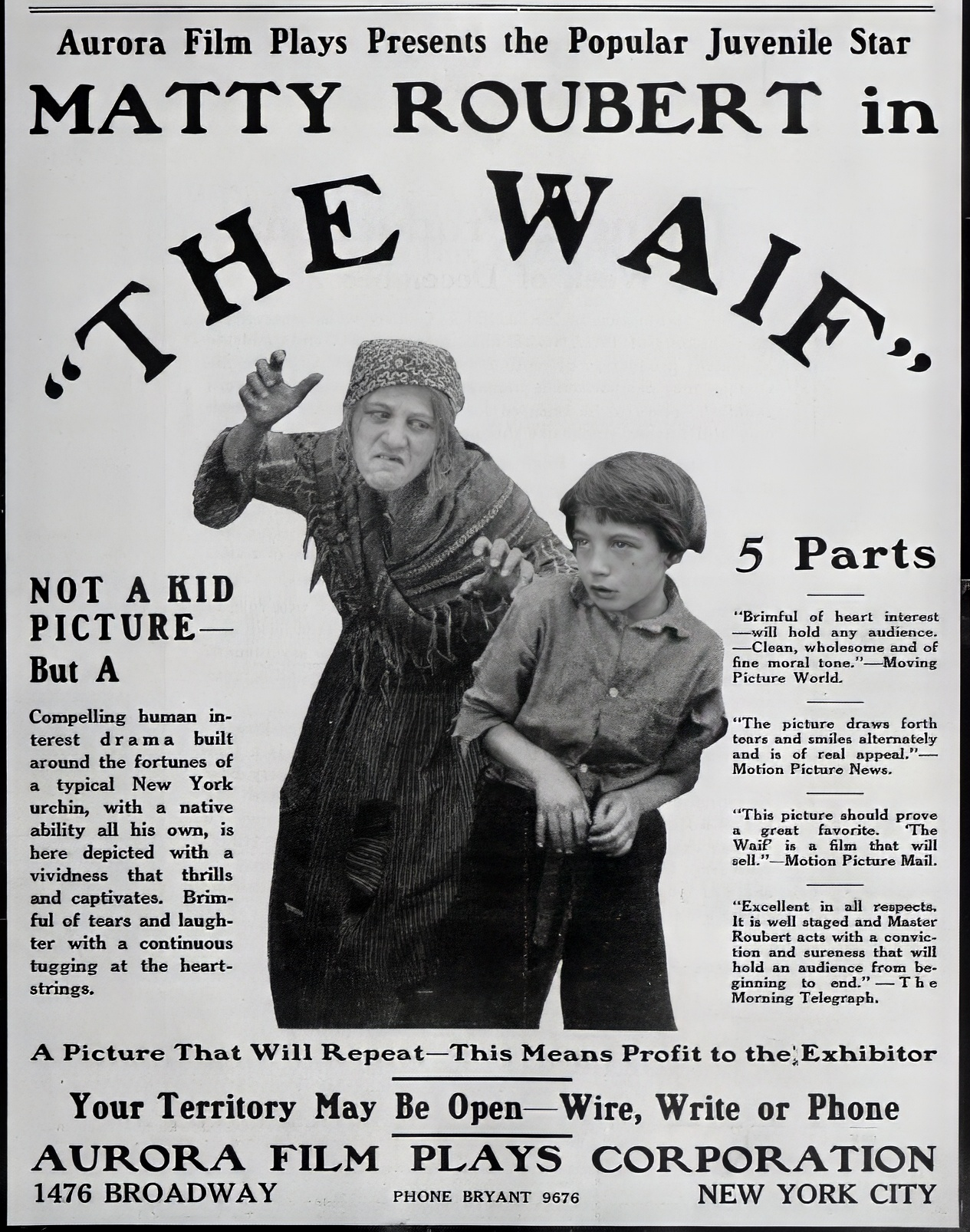
Advertisement for silent film The Waif

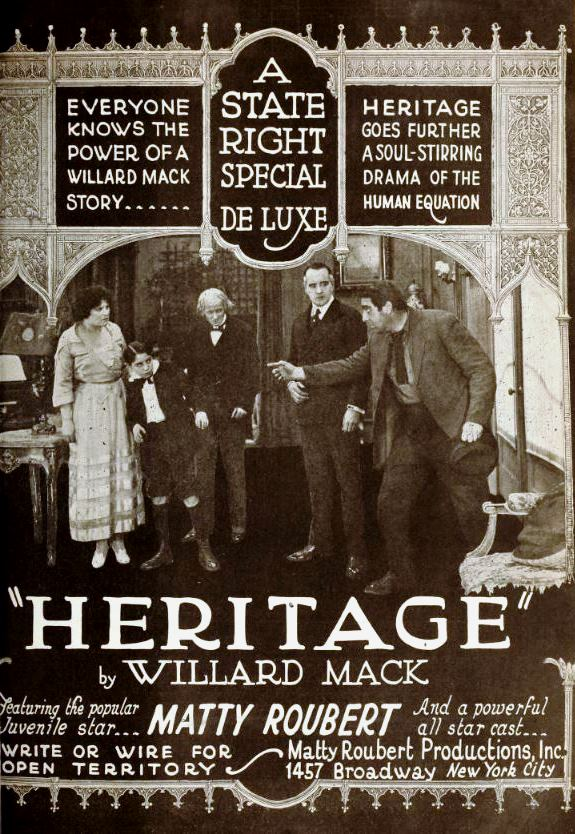
Advertisement for Heritage

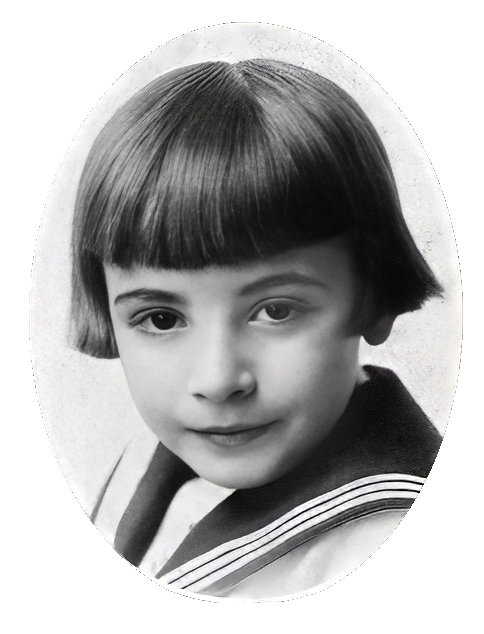
Roubert publicity photograph circa 1914

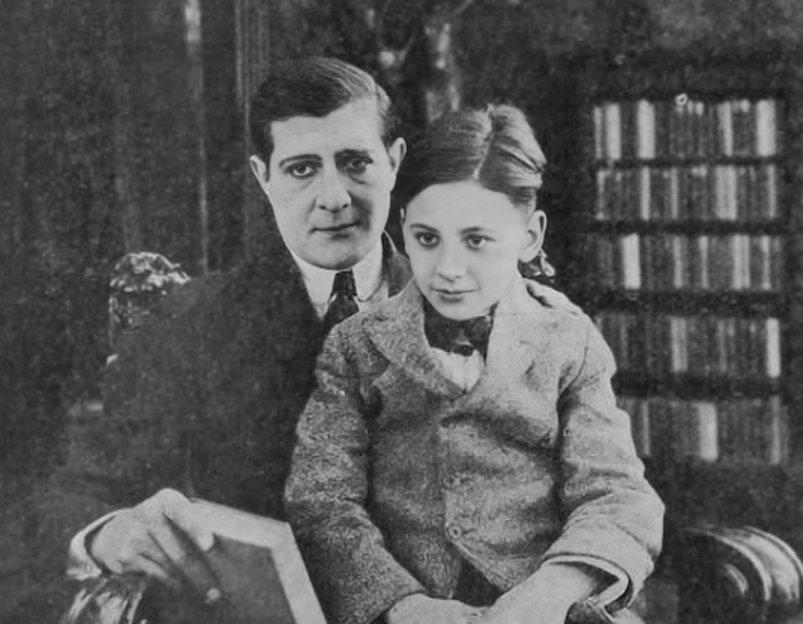
Roubert with Hobart Henley in a scene from Parentage

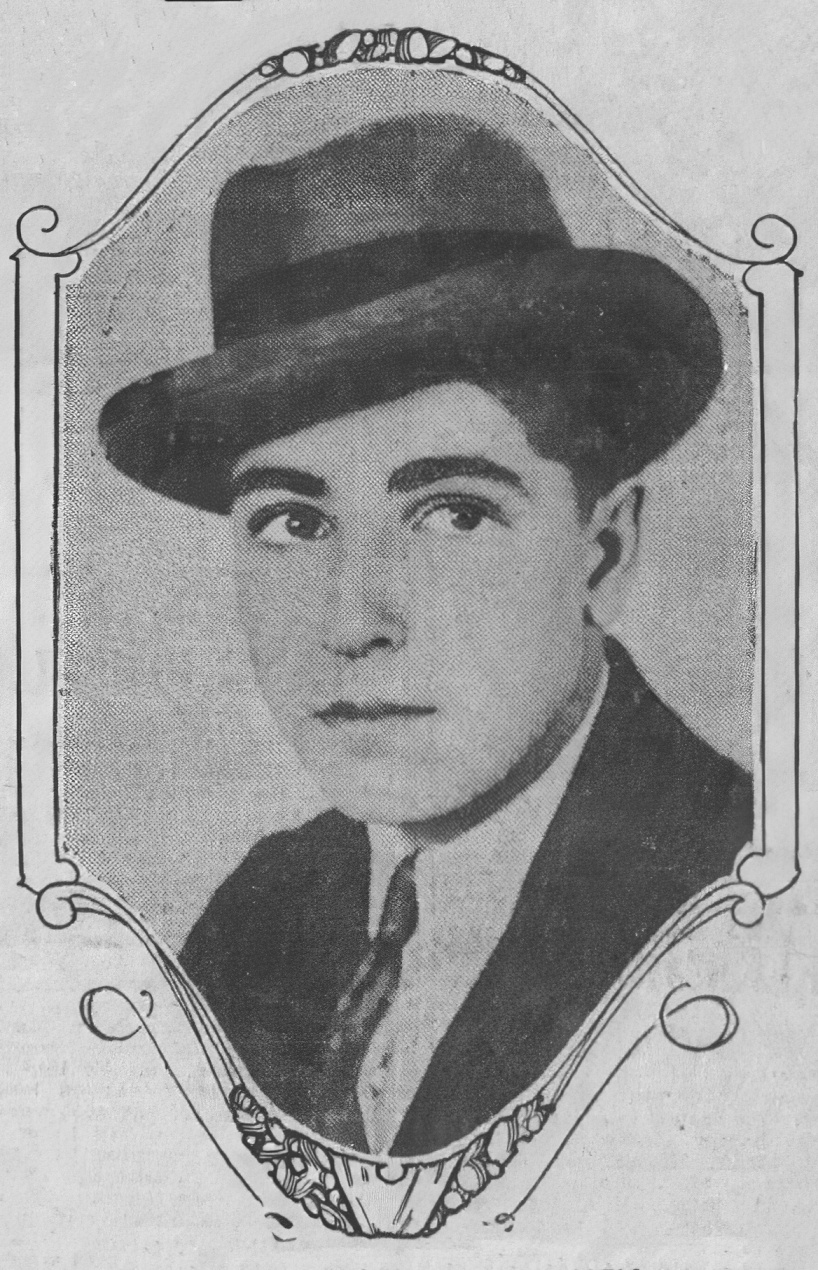
Roubert at eighteen years old

Year	Film	Ref.
1910	Uncle Tom's Cabin	
1911	The Freshet	
1912	Baby Sherlock	
1912	The Coming Generation	
1912	The Golden Rule	
1912	Ransom	
1912	Tangled	
1913	A Man's Awakening	
1913	Mrs. Brown's Burglar	
1913	When Dolly Died	
1914	How Villains Are Made	
1914	John Barleycorn	
1914	Little Billy's City Cousin	
1914	One Day Of Matty's Life	
1914	The Race	
1914	Vasco the Vampire	
1915	A Bachelor's Christmas	
1916	The Big Sister	
1916	Blind Man's Bluff	
1916	The Scarlet Mark	
1917	The Waif	
1918	Parentage	
1920	Heritage	
1923	For You My Boy	
1923	The Stolen Child	
1925	After a Reputation	
1929	Close Harmony	
1931	The Wife Wins	
1931	Up Pops the Devil	
1932	Tom Brown of Culver	
1933	The Prizefighter and the Lady	
1934	Broadway Bill	
1934	Evelyn Prentice	
1934	Jealousy	
1934	The Merry Widow	
1934	The Mighty Barnum	
1935	Mad Love	
1935	The Four Star Boarder	
1936	Divot Diggers	
1937	Crusade Against Rackets	
1938	Gold Mine in the Sky	
1938	Shine On, Harvest Moon	
1939	Saga of Death Valley	
1940	Adventures of Red Ryder	
1940	Frontier Vengeance	
1940	Lone Star Raiders	
1940	Knute Rockne, All American	
1940	One Man's Law	
1940	The Trail Blazers	
1940	Under Texas Skies	
1941	Arizona Bound	
1941	Gauchos of Eldorado	
1941	The Phantom Cowboy	
1943	The Blocked Trail	
1943	West of Texas	
1945	Gangster's Den	
1945	Song of the Prairie	
1946	Daughter of Don Q	
1946	The Fighting Frontiersman	
1946	Galloping Thunder	
1946	Gunning for Vengeance	
1946	Heading West	
1946	Lone Star Moonlight	
1946	Prairie Outlaws	
1946	Romance of the West	
1946	Santa Fe Uprising	
1946	Stars Over Texas	
1946	Terror Trail	
1946	That Texas Jamboree	
1946	Thunder Town	
1946	Tumbleweed Trail	
1946	Two-Fisted Stranger	
1947	Border Feud	
1947	Buffalo Bill Rides Again	
1947	The Fighting Vigilantes	
1947	Law of the Lash	
1947	The Lone Hand Texan	
1947	Valley of Fear	
1948	G-Men Never Forget	
1948	Phantom Valley	
1949	Challenge of the Range	
1950	Gunfire	
1950	Hoedown	
1950	I Shot Billy the Kid	
1951	Cyclone Fury	
1952	The Rough, Tough West	

== Short films series ==
Circus Days, 1920 silent film starring Roubert, Romances of Youth series

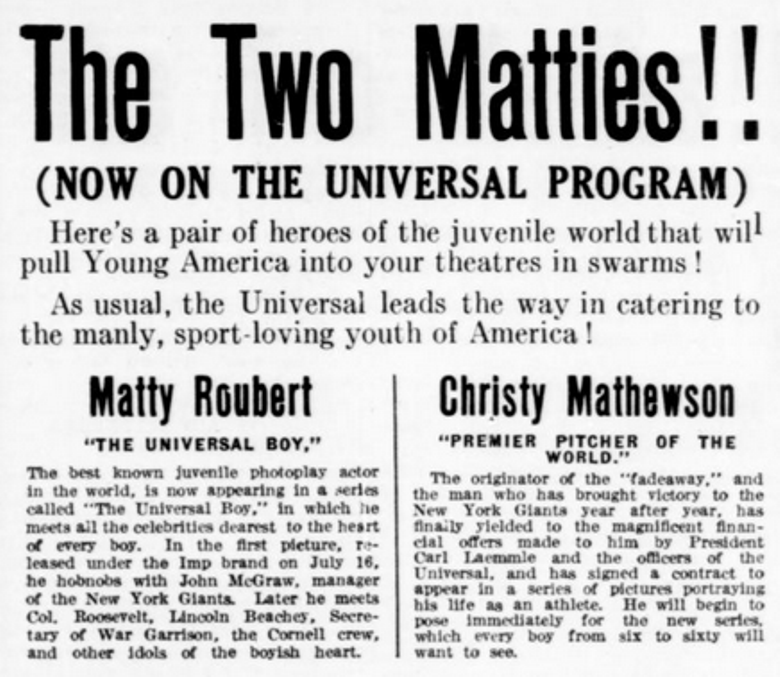
Advertisement for The Universal Boy series

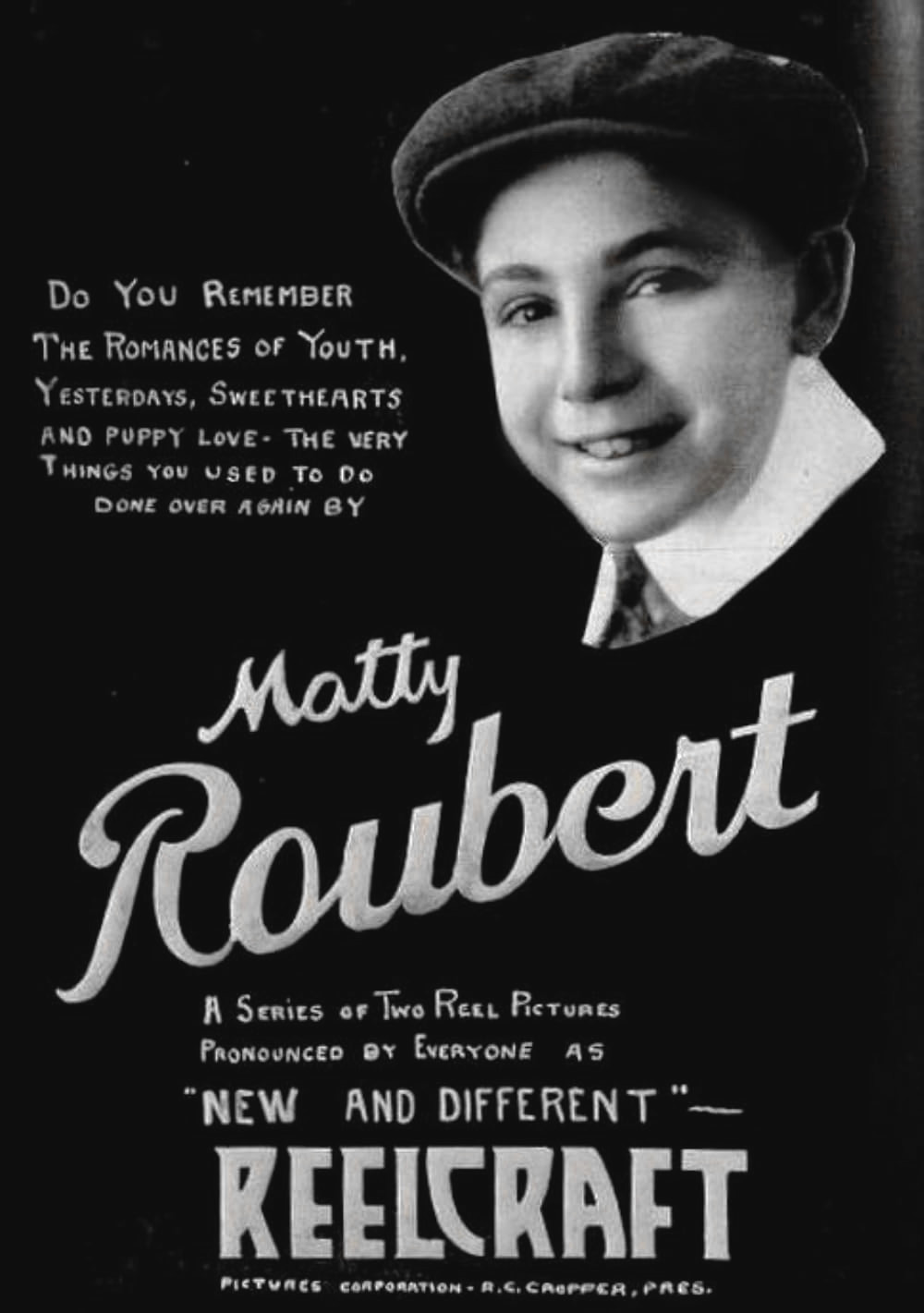
Advertisement for Romances of Youth series

Roubert was seven years old when he became the Universal Boy. During his stint in the series, Roubert would meet a well known celebrity in each short, among them: American actors King Baggot, William Shay, Frank Crane, DeWolf Hopper, American aviator Lincoln Beachey, New York Giants manager John McGraw, Australian swimmer Annette Kellerman, American lyricist Oscar Hammerstein, New York Giants pitcher Christy Mathewson, Secretary of War Lindley Garrison, the Columbia University rowing crew, Theodore Roosevelt, American race car driver Barney Oldfield, American businessman Nathan Straus, and German-American editorial cartoonist Hy Mayer.

Roubert was twelve when he was cast in the Romance of Youth series. According to R.C. Cropper, president of Reelcraft Pictures, "this will be the biggest series of its kind ever attempted in the independent field. These will be feature productions in every sense of the word, from the preparation of the story right on through cast and production. The stories will concern adventures of boys and girls, in other words, the days of youth, but they will appeal to audiences of all ages."

Universal Boy Series
Year	Film	Ref.
1914	The Universal Boy	
1914	The Universal Boy Joins the Boy Scouts	
1914	The Universal Boy Solves the Chinese Mystery	
1914	The Universal Boy in the Juvenile Reformer	
1914	The Universal Boy as the Newsboy's Friend	
1914	The Universal Boy in Rural Adventures	
1914	The Universal Boy in the Gates of Liberty	
1914	The Universal Boy in the Mystery of the New York Docks	
1914	The Universal Boy in Cupid and the Fishes	
1914	The Universal Boy in the Young Philanthropist	
Romances of Youth series
1920	A Bold Bad Pirate	
1920	At The Old Swimming Hole	
1920	Circus Days	
1920	Everyone's Orphan	
1920	Romance	
1920	She's a Vamp	
1920	Summer Days	
1920	Sunshine	

== Gallery ==
Roubert meeting various individuals for the Universal Boy series.

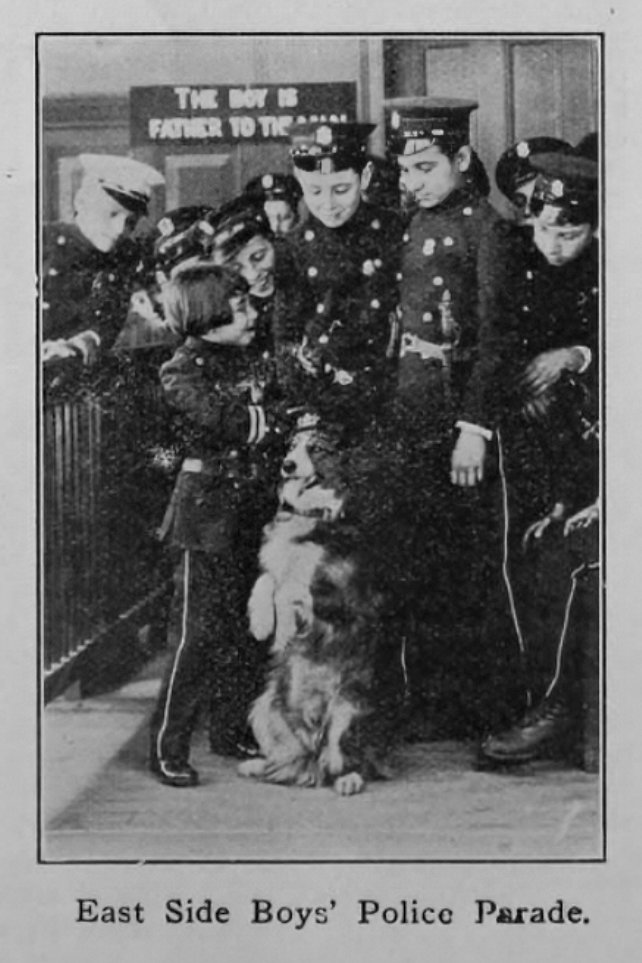
Roubert meets the police

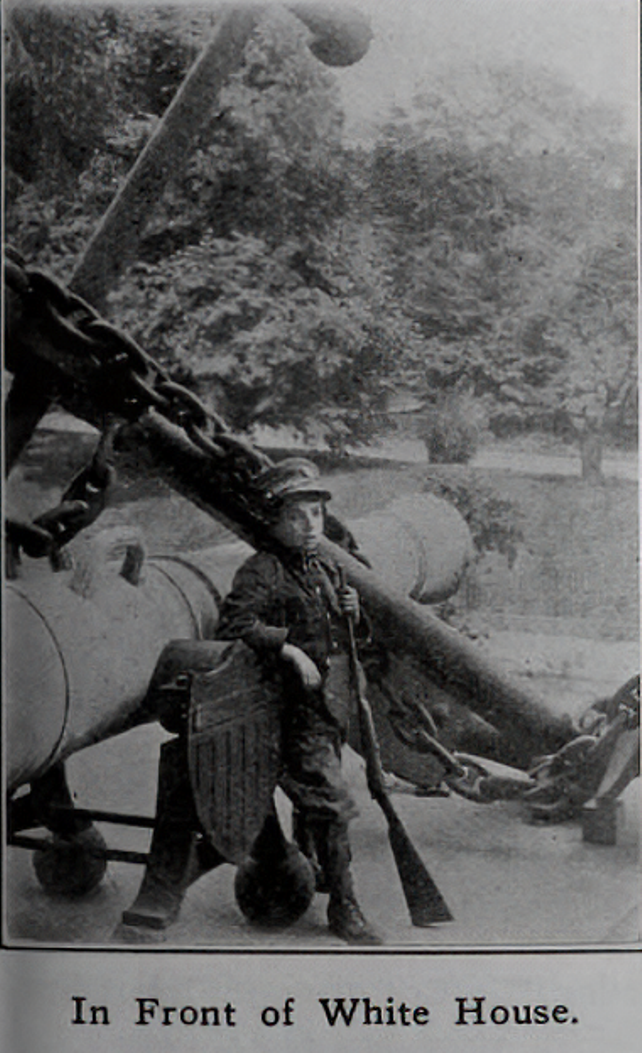
Roubert at the White House

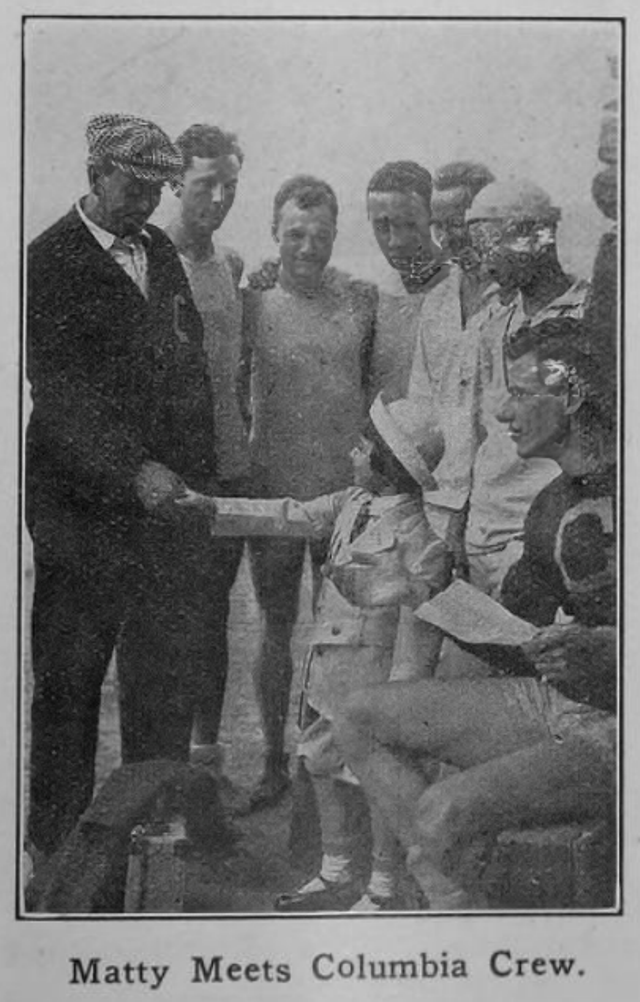
Roubert meets the Columbia University rowing crew

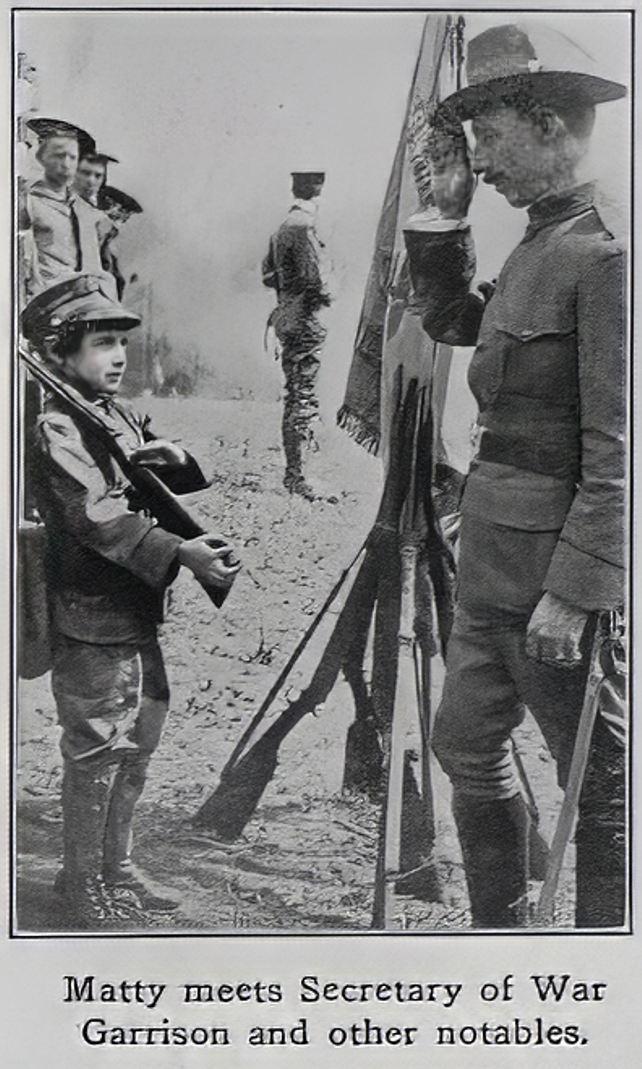
Roubert meets Secretary of War Lindley Garrison

== See also ==
- List of American former child actors
- List of lost silent films (1910–1914)
- List of lost silent films (1915–1919)
- List of lost silent films (1920–1924)

== Sources ==
- Adams, Les (1978). Shoot-em-ups: The Complete Reference Guide to Westerns of the Sound Era. Arlington House Publishers. ISBN 978-0-87000-393-6.
- "Matty Roubert". American Film Institute Catalog. American Film Institute. Archived from the original on May 15, 2025.
- "At The Theaters". The Andover Townsman. March 11, 1921. p. 2.
- Braff, Richard E. (1999). The Universal Silents: A Filmography of the Universal Motion Picture Manufacturing Company, 1912–1929. Jefferson, North Carolina: McFarland. ISBN 978-0-7864-0287-8.
- "Master Matty Roubert". The Billboard. Vol. 25, no. 1. January 4, 1913. p. 15.
- Braff, Richard (2002). The Braff Silent Short Film Working Papers: Over 25, 000 Films, 1903–1929, Alphabetized and Indexed. McFarland. ISBN 0786410310.
- "Buddy and Nancy Make Love, Sing and Dance in Close Harmony". The China Press. November 10, 1929. p. A5.
- "Today: The Waif". The Daily Republican. April 9, 1917. p. 3.
- Decatur Daily (October 11, 1914). "The Child Of The Movies". Decatur Daily Review. p. 8.
- Hale, Wanda (July 25, 1937). "Rackets Picture Reopens Gaiety". New York Daily News. p. 67.
- Hall, Mordaunt (May 16, 1931). "The Screen: The Wife Wins. A Costly Car. An Engaging Philanderer. Mr. Jones's Second Lesson. Miss Davies's New Comedy. Modern Marriage". The New York Times. p. 20.
- Dunkleberger, Amy; King Hanson, Patricia, eds. (1999). AFI Catalog of Motion Pictures Produced in the United States. University of California Press. p. 1348. ISBN 978-0-520-21521-4.
- "Early Film Star Returns To Field". Hollywood Daily Citizen. November 7, 1924. p. 9.
- Honolulu Advertiser (May 22, 1973). "Obiturary: Roubert, Matthew Matty of Honolulu". The Honolulu Advertiser. p. 28.
- Henley, Hobart (1917). "Hobart Henley Tells How He Obtained Results With Children In Parentage". Dramatic Mirror of the Stage and Motion Pictures. Vol. 77. p. 25.
- Hoffman, Esther (September 11, 1914). "Do You Know Matty, The Movie Boy?". The Pittsburgh Press.
- King, Rob (Fall 2001). "The Kid from The Kid: Jackie Coogan and the Consolidation of Child Consumerism". The Velvet Light Trap. 48: 4.
- "First Film Tots Sweethearts". Los Angeles Times. Vol. 43. October 29, 1924. p. 1.
- Maltin, Leonard (1972). The Great Movie Shorts. foreword by Pete Smith. New York: Crown Publishers. ISBN 978-0-517-50455-0.
- Mank, Gregory William (June 21, 2010). Hollywood Cauldron: Thirteen Horror Films from the Genre's Golden Age. McFarland. p. 121. ISBN 978-0-7864-6255-1.
- Martin, Len D. (1998). The Republic Pictures Checklist: Features, Serials, Cartoons, Short Subjects and Training Films of Republic Pictures Corporation, 1935–1959. McFarland. ISBN 978-1-4766-0960-7.
- Massa, Steve (2013). "Hal Roach Presents His Silent Rascals". Lame Brains and Lunatics. foreword by Eileen Bowser. Duncan, Oklahoma: BearManor Media. p. 383. ISBN 978-1-59393-268-8.
- "Master Matty Roubert to be Starred in New 'Universal Boy' Film Series". The Morning Star. Vol. 94, no. 110. July 19, 1914. p. 12.
- "Matty Rouberts Series Selling Fast". Motion Picture News: 1897. September 4, 1920.
- "Reelcraft Pictures Corp. Royal Comedies". Motion Picture News: 2712. October 2, 1920.
- "An Ideal Studio At Hollywood For The Powers Photo Plays". The Moving Picture News. Vol. 7, no. 1. January 4, 1913. p. 15.
- "Reelcraft Reports Practically All Territory Sold on Matty Roubert's Romances Of Youth". The Moving Picture World. September 4, 1920. p. 75.
- The Moving Picture World (1915). "Matty Roubert, Boy Star Of The Waif". The Moving Picture World. p. 2368.
- "Matty Roubert Starts Work on Third Picture of His Series For Reelcraft". The Moving Picture World: 1168. August 28, 1920.
- "The Newsboy's Friend". The Moving Picture World: 65. 1914.
- "Six New Productions Are Completed For Reelcraft". The Moving Picture World: 1244. October 30, 1920.
- "Reelcraft Producing a Series of Two-Reel Boyhood Stories With Matty Roubert as Star". The Moving Picture World: 1324. June 5, 1920.
- Munden, Kenneth W., ed. (1971). The American Film Institute Catalog Of Motion Pictures Produced In The United States. American Film Institute: Feature Films 1921-1930. New York: R.R. Bowker Company. p. 766. ISBN 0-8352-0440-5.
- "The Big Sister". The New York Clipper. Vol. 64, no. 33. September 23, 1916. p. 35.
- "Marriage Is Told". Pasadena Star-News. December 14, 1934.
- "Bon Voyage Party is Given in Honor of Mrs. M. Roubert". Pasadena Star-News. February 8, 1936. p. 6.
- Pitts, Michael R. (2009). Western Film Series of the Sound Era. McFarland. ISBN 978-0-7864-3529-6.
- Rainey, Buck (1990). The Shoot-em-ups Ride Again: A Supplement To Shoot-em-ups. Scarecrow Press. ISBN 978-0-8108-2132-3.
- Reid, John Howard (2005). Hollywood B Movies: A Treasury of Spills, Chills & Thrills. ISBN 978-1-4116-5065-7.
- "Boys Organize Exalted Order Of Kingfishes". Seminole Producer. p. 11.
- "Up Pops The Devil". Sunday Times Signal. June 14, 1931. p. 9.
- Slide, Anthony (1978). "Child Stars Of The 'Teens". Aspects of American Film History Prior to 1920. Scarecrow Press. pp. 19–20. ISBN 0-8108-1130-8.
- Todd, Stanley W. (1916). "The Boys Of The Screen". Motion Picture Classic. Vol. 2. p. 21.
- "For You My Boy, Sensation of year". Reading Times. March 15, 1924. p. 1.
- "Matty Roubert List of Movies". TV Guide. 2025. Archived from the original on May 14, 2025.
- Usai, Paolo Cherchi (July 25, 2019). The Griffith Project, Volume 12: Essays on D.W. Griffith. Bloomsbury Publishing. p. 20. ISBN 978-1-83902-003-2.
- "John Barleycorn". Variety. Vol. 35, no. 7. July 17, 1914. p. 17.
- "Youth Seven Screen Success". The Vicksburg Post. July 24, 1914. p. 5. story continued
- Wids (1920). "Matty Roubert: Current Release Heritage". Wids Year Book. p. 250.
- "Silent Film Artists 1908–1919". Young Hollywood Hall of Fame.
