= Uncle Tom (disambiguation) =

Uncle Tom is the title character of Harriet Beecher Stowe's 1852 novel, Uncle Tom's Cabin.

Uncle Tom may also refer to:

- Uncle Tom (painting), an 1857 painting by Edwin Landseer
- Uncle Tom (film), a 2020 documentary film about Black conservatism in the United States
- Uncle Tom syndrome, a psychological coping skill in which individuals use passivity and submissiveness when confronted with a threat
- Uncle Tom Cobley, a humorous placeholder name in British English

== See also ==
- Uncle Tom's Cabin (disambiguation)
