= Her Better Self =

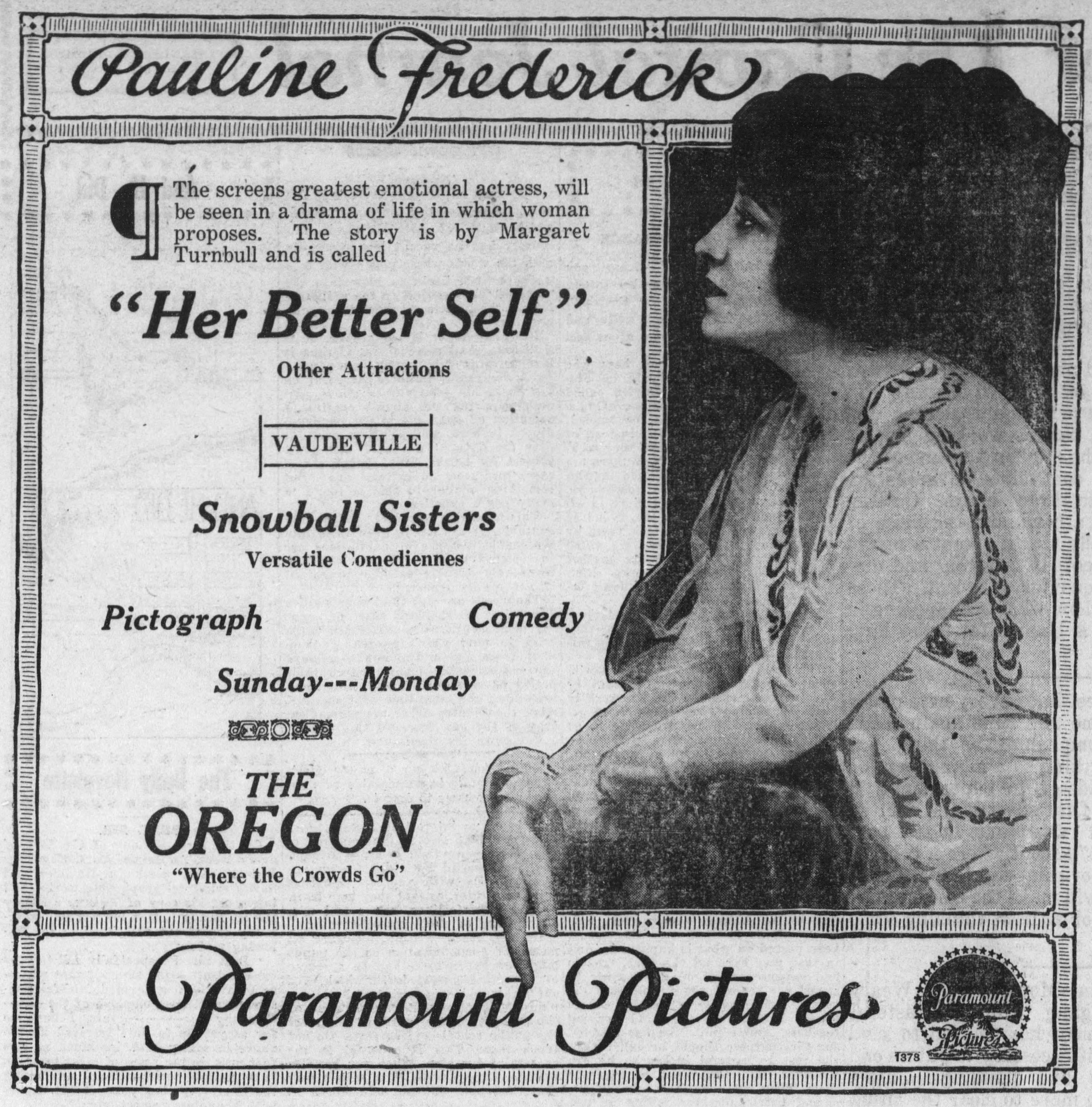
- Newspaper advertisement
- Directed by: Robert G. Vignola; William J. Scully (asst. director)
- Written by: Margaret Turnbull
- Produced by: Adolph Zukor
- Starring: Pauline Frederick; Thomas Meighan
- Cinematography: Ned Van Buren
- Production company: Famous Players Film Company
- Distributed by: Paramount Pictures
- Release date: May 21, 1917
- Running time: 50 minutes
- Country: United States
- Language: Silent (English intertitles)

Her Better Self is a 1917 American silent drama film starring Pauline Frederick and Thomas Meighan and directed by Robert G. Vignola. It was produced by Famous Players Film Company and distributed by Paramount Pictures.

== Cast ==
- Pauline Frederick as Vivian Tyler
- Thomas Meighan as Dr. Robert Keith
- Alice Hollister as Aggie May
- Maude Turner Gordon as Mrs.Tyler
- Charles Wellesley as Mr. Tyler
- Frank De Rheim as Count Belloto
- Armand Cortes as Dopey

== Reception ==
Like many American films of the time, Her Better Self was subject to cuts by city and state film censorship boards. The Chicago Board of Censors required cuts of two scenes of a girl walking away with a man and the arrest of the girl, an intertitle stating "I left the town in disgrace," and the stabbing in the suicide scene and the vision of the same.

== Preservation ==
Her Better Self is currently presumed lost. In February of 2021, the film was cited by the National Film Preservation Board on their Lost U.S. Silent Feature Films list.

== See also ==
- List of lost films
