= Heritage (1920 film) =

1920 film

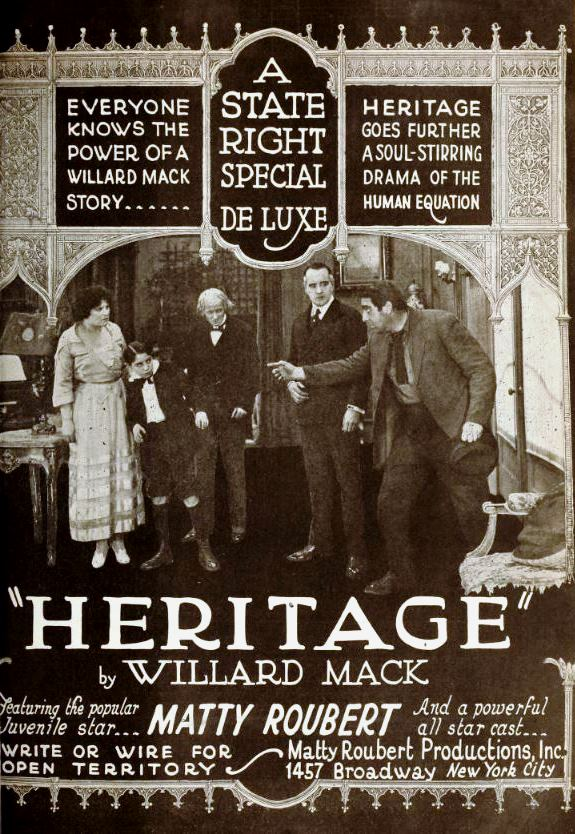
- Advertisement
- Directed by: William L. Roubert
- Written by: William L. Roubert
- Based on: a story by Willard Mack
- Produced by: Matty Roubert Productions
- Starring: Matty Roubert; Herbert Standing
- Cinematography: N. C. Travis
- Production company: Matty Roubert Productions Inc.
- Distributed by: State Rights
- Release date: August 1920
- Running time: 5 reels
- Country: United States
- Language: Silent (English intertitles)

Heritage is 1920 American silent drama film directed by William L. Roubert and starring his son Matty Roubert and Herbert Standing.

== Cast ==
- Matty Roubert as Jit
- Herbert Standing as Charles Suydam
- Augusta Perry as Mrs. Suydam
- Joseph Burke as Edward Brackett
- Phil Sanford as Tony (credited as Philip Sanford)
- Adelaide Fitz-Allen as Tony's Mother (credited as Adelaide Fitzallen)

== Preservation status ==
A print of Heritage is preserved in the Library of Congress collection.
