= Hour of Reckoning =

1927 film

- Directed by: John Ince
- Written by: Frederick Chapin
- Produced by: George H. Davis; John Ince
- Starring: Herbert Rawlinson; Grace Darmond; Harry von Meter
- Cinematography: Bert Baldridge
- Production company: John Ince Productions
- Distributed by: Davis Distributing Division
- Release date: September 19, 1927
- Running time: 58 minutes
- Country: United States
- Languages: Silent; English intertitles

Hour of Reckoning is a 1927 American silent drama film directed by John Ince and starring Herbert Rawlinson, Grace Darmond and Harry von Meter.

== Synopsis ==
A clerk at a safe manufacturing company is wrongly accused of steal money, when the real culprit is the owner's son.

== Cast ==
- Herbert Rawlinson as Jim Armstrong
- Grace Darmond as Marion Hastings
- John Ince as Winton Crane
- Harry von Meter as Turner
- James B. Lowe as Servant
- Virginia Castleman
- John J. Darby
- Edwin Middleton

== Bibliography ==
- Munden, Kenneth White. The American Film Institute Catalog of Motion Pictures Produced in the United States, Part 1. University of California Press, 1997.
