= The Scarab Ring =

1921 silent film

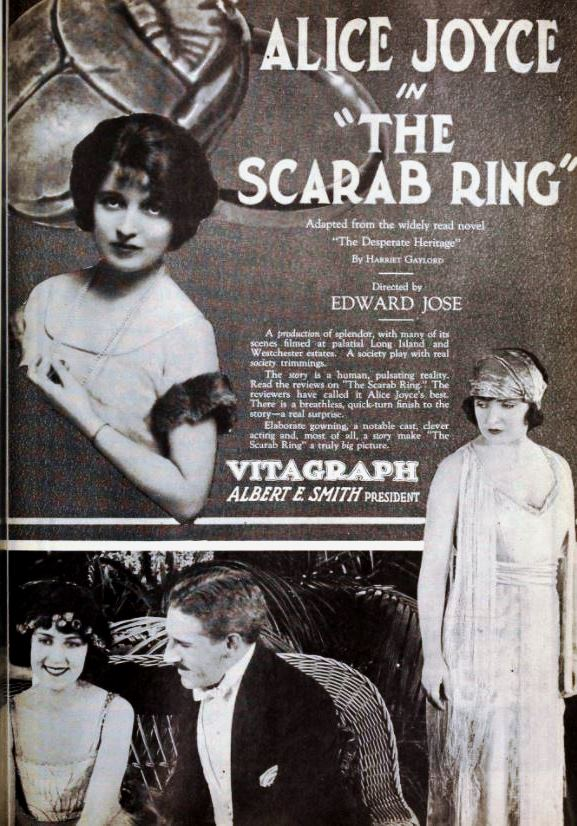
- Directed by: Edward José
- Written by: C. Graham Baker; Harriet Gaylord
- Starring: Alice Joyce; Maude Malcolm; Joe King
- Cinematography: Joseph Shelderfer
- Production company: Vitagraph Company of America
- Distributed by: Vitagraph Company of America
- Release date: June 1921
- Running time: 60 minutes
- Country: United States
- Languages: Silent; English intertitles

The Scarab Ring is a 1921 American silent mystery film directed by Edward José and starring Alice Joyce, Maude Malcolm and Joe King.

== Plot ==
On his deathbed, bank president John Randall talks with his oldest daughter, Constance, about a long-ago crime he has covered up with her help, paying a subordinate to take the fall for him. Constance swears to her father that she will never reveal his secret to her younger sister, Muriel.

After her father's death, Constance is approached by the villainous Hugh Martin. He has obtained letters written by Constance and her father which detail their collusion in the cover-up. Martin tells Constance she must persuade Muriel to marry him, or he will expose their father's misdeeds by giving the letters to the newspaper. Before he can carry out his threat Martin is found dead in his apartment. Near his body is a scarab ring similar to one belonging to Constance. She is charged with his murder and put on trial. Her lover, the lawyer Ward Locke, successfully defends her and she is acquitted. After the trial, Ward proposes marriage, but Constance refuses him. Ward's father questions Constance, and she confesses to having committed the murder, although it was done in self-defense. Ward declares his love for Constance is unchanged, and she accepts his proposal.

== Cast ==
- Alice Joyce as Constance Randall
- Maude Malcolm as Muriel Randall
- Joe King as Ward Locke
- Eddie Phillips as Burton Temple
- Fuller Mellish as John Randall
- Claude King as Hugh Martinn
- Joseph W. Smiley as James Locke
- Jack Hopkins as Mr. Kheres
- Armand Cortes as Kennedy

== Bibliography ==
- Ken Wlaschin. Silent Mystery and Detective Movies: A Comprehensive Filmography. McFarland, 2009.
