= Maude Turner Gordon =

American actress

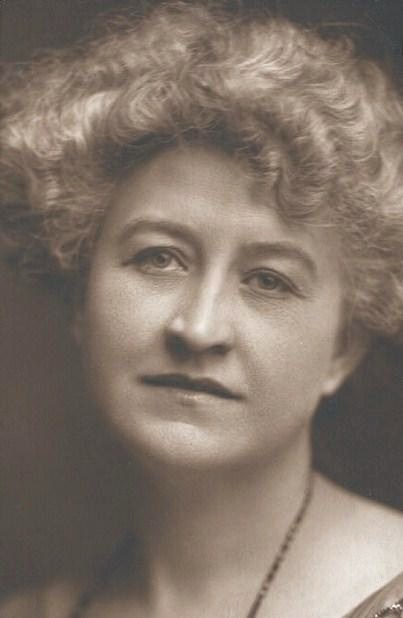
- Turner in 1910
- Born: Maude Turner; November 10, 1868; Franklin, Indiana, U.S.
- Died: January 12, 1940 (aged 71); Los Angeles, California, U.S.
- Resting place: Hollywood Forever Cemetery
- Occupations: Actress, theatrical producer
- Years active: 1914-1938
- Spouse: John Charles Fremont Gordon (1885-1940; her death)
- Children: 1

Maude Turner Gordon (November 10, 1868 – January 12, 1940) was an American actress who appeared in 81 films between 1914 and 1938.

== Biography ==
Born in Franklin, Indiana, Gordon was the daughter of Alexander and Nancy (Wright) Turner. She was educated in the schools in Franklin.

In the early 1900s, Gordon performed in repertory theatre with the Neill Stock Company in California.

She appeared in a number of Broadway productions from 1908 to 1925 including: Glorious Betsy, The American Maid, A Full House, Elsie, and Big Boy. She appeared onstage in Mrs. Holmes, Detective, which was produced by her own company.

Her elder sister, Emma Harper Turner, served from 1890 to 1893 as Grand President of Pi Beta Phi, an international women's fraternity. Another sister, Nelle Turner, was a member of Pi Beta Phi.

== Family ==
She eloped and married John C. Gordon on December 19, 1885, in Johnson County, Indiana. Their daughter, Dorothy, an alumna of the Fauquier Institute of Warrenton, Virginia, married Lt. Robert A. White of the U.S. Navy in 1916.

== Death ==
On January 12, 1940, Gordon died from pneumonia in Los Angeles, California, aged 71. Survivors included her sister, Emma.

== Selected filmography ==
- The Kreutzer Sonata (1915)
- Miss George Washington (1916)
- The Honeymoon (1917)
- Her Better Self (1917)
- The Lie (1918)
- The Service Star (1918)
- The Danger Mark (1918)
- The Turn of the Wheel (1918)
- The Ordeal of Rosetta (1918)
- Just for Tonight (1918)
- The Divorcee (1919)
- Home Wanted (1919)
- Away Goes Prudence (1920)
- Civilian Clothes (1920)
- Beyond Price (1921)
- The Price of Possession (1921)
- Enchantment (1921)
- Women Men Marry (1922)
- Homeward Bound (1923)
- Born Rich (1924)
- The Little French Girl (1925)
- The Early Bird (1925)
- The Palm Beach Girl (1926)
- Cheating Cheaters (1927)
- The Wizard (1927)
- Home Made (1927)
- Hot News (1928)
- The Naughty Duchess (1928)
- Glad Rag Doll (1929)
- The Hottentot (1929)
- The Marriage Playground (1929)
- Sally (1929)
- The Last of Mrs. Cheyney (1929)
- High Stakes (1931)
- Back Street (1932)
- Shopworn (1932)
- She Loves Me Not (1934)
- Living on Velvet (1935)
