= They Shall Pay =

1921 film

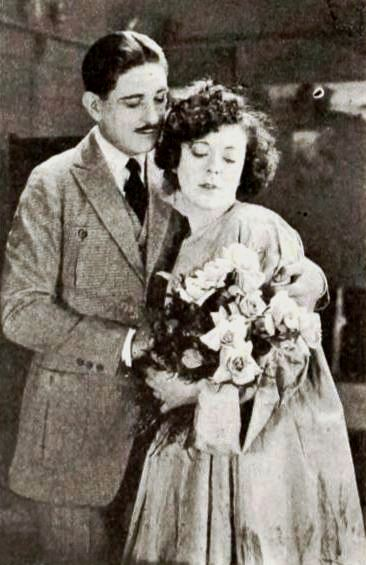
- Still with Allan Forrest and Lottie Pickford
- Directed by: Martin Justice
- Written by: Martin Justice
- Starring: Lottie Pickford; Allan Forrest; Paul Weigel
- Cinematography: L. William O'Connell
- Edited by: Stuart Heisler
- Production company: Playgoers Pictures
- Distributed by: Associated Exhibitors
- Release date: August 17, 1921
- Running time: 60 minutes
- Country: United States
- Language: Silent (English intertitles)

They Shall Pay is a 1921 American silent drama film directed by Martin Justice and starring Lottie Pickford, Allan Forrest, and Paul Weigel.

The film's sets were designed by the art director Max Parker.

== Cast ==
- Lottie Pickford as Margaret Seldon
- Allan Forrest as Allan Forbes
- Paul Weigel as Henry Seldon
- Lloyd Whitlock as Courtland Wells
- George Periolat as Amos Colby
- Katherine Griffith as Mrs. Yates

== Bibliography ==
- Langman, Larry. American Film Cycles: The Silent Era. Greenwood Publishing, 1998.
