= The Big Sister (film) =

1916 film by John B. O'Brien

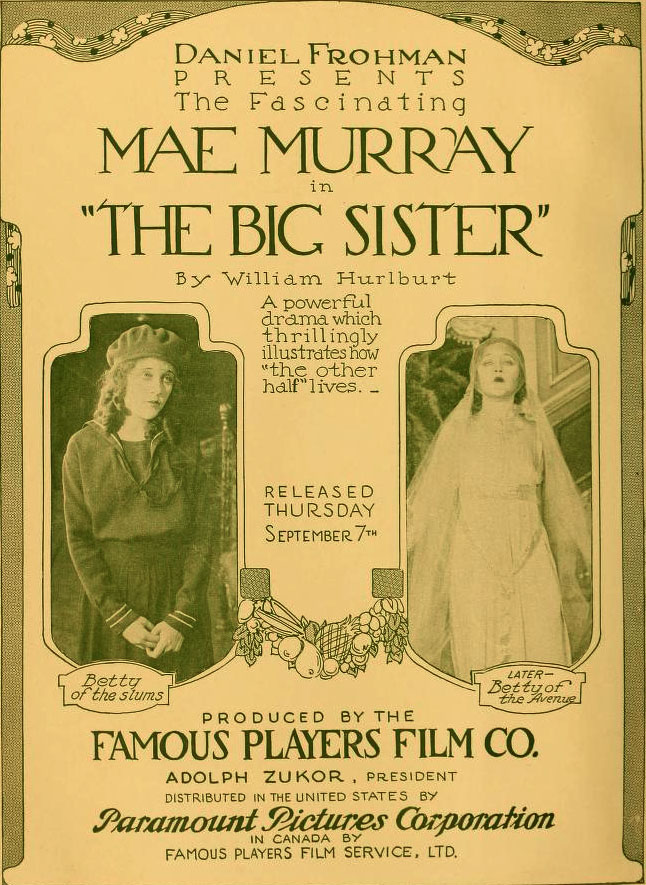
- Theatrical release poster
- Directed by: John B. O'Brien
- Screenplay by: Harvey F. Thew
- Story by: William Hurlbut
- Starring: Mae Murray; Matty Roubert; Harry C. Browne; Ida Darling; Armand Cortes; Tammany Young
- Cinematography: Larry Williams
- Production company: Famous Players Film Company
- Distributed by: Paramount Pictures
- Release date: September 7, 1916
- Running time: 50 minutes
- Country: United States
- Languages: Silent film (English intertitles)

The Big Sister is a lost 1916 American drama silent film directed by John B. O'Brien and written by Harvey F. Thew. The film stars Mae Murray, Matty Roubert, Harry C. Browne, Ida Darling, Armand Cortes and Tammany Young. The film was released on September 7, 1916, by Paramount Pictures.

== Plot ==
Escaping Nifty Mendez, a slave trader who framed their father, Betty Norton and younger brother Jimmy are on the run when the boy is hit by a car that fractures his leg. The driver, Rodney Channing, insists on hosting Jimmy during his convalescence and so, dating the beautiful Betty, he falls in love with her and the couple begin to plan a future together.

But Mendez, having learned of the thing, threatens the girl, whose father is in prison: if he does not pay for her silence, he will reveal her past to the betrothed, thus messing up the wedding. Betty, however, does not give in to blackmail: she herself writes a letter to Rodney where she tells him her story and then runs away.

When Mendez is killed in a showdown, Betty is free. Rodney, who was looking for her, finally finds her: he doesn't care about his father, he just wants her. The doors of a radiant future open wide to the two.

== Cast ==
- Mae Murray as Betty Norton
- Matty Roubert as Jimmy Norton
- Harry C. Browne as Rodney Channing
- Ida Darling as Mrs. Spaulding
- Armand Cortes as Nifty Mendez
- Tammany Young as Joe Kelly
- Florence Flinn as Edith
- Joseph Gleason as Robert Colton
- J. Albert Hall as Norton

== Preservation ==
With no holdings located in archives, The Big Sister is considered a lost film.
