= Armand Cortes =

American actor (1880–1948)

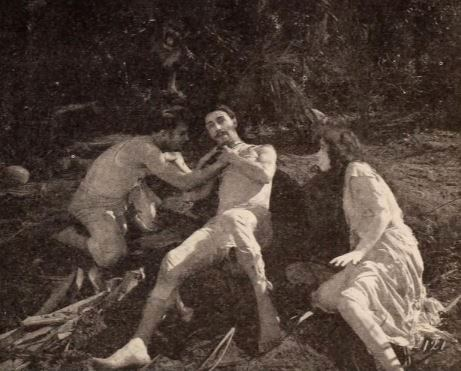
- Cortes (center) in The Revenge of Tarzan (1920)
- Born: August 16, 1880; Nîmes, France
- Died: November 19, 1948 (aged 68); San Francisco, California, U.S.
- Occupation: Actor

Armand Cortes, sometimes credited as Armand Cortez, (August 16, 1880 – November 19, 1948) was an American actor in theater and film in the United States. He had various theatrical roles in the late 1920s and early 1930s.

In 1902, he was cast in the musical comedy The Messenger Boy. He was in the musical revue Star Time at the Majestic Theater in 1944.

He had various supporting roles in films. In 1918 he played the villain in Dodging a Million. He also played the villain in The Revenge of Tarzan.

He was born in Nîmes, France. He died in San Francisco.

== Filmography ==
- The House of Bondage (1914)
- How Molly Made Good (1915)
- The Big Sister (film) (1916)
- Yellow Menace (1916), as Hong Kong Harry
- Seven Keys to Baldpate (1917)
- Her Better Self (1917)
- The Angel Factory (1917)
- The Road Between (1917)
- Dodging a Million (1918)
- The Servant Question (1920)
- His Temporary Wife (1920)
- The Revenge of Tarzan (1920)
- The Scarab Ring (1921)
- The Matrimonial Web (1921)
- Wages of Virtue (1924)
- Galloping Hoofs (1924)
- The Crowded Hour (1925)
- The Palm Beach Girl (1926)
- The Music Master (film) (1927)
- What an Idea (1932)
- Bluebeard's Eighth Wife (1938)
- Broadway Brevities
