= The Angel Factory =

- Directed by: Lawrence B. McGill
- Written by: Lucien Hubbard; Will M. Ritchey
- Starring: Antonio Moreno; Helene Chadwick; Armand Cortes
- Cinematography: Harry Wood
- Production company: Astra Film
- Distributed by: Pathé Exchange
- Release date: September 16, 1917
- Country: United States
- Languages: Silent; English intertitles

The Angel Factory is a 1917 American silent drama film directed by Lawrence B. McGill and starring Antonio Moreno, Helene Chadwick and Armand Cortes.

== Action ==
In the slums of New York, David Darrow runs a home called "The Angel Factory" where he attempts to help people who are being oppressed. In the course of this work, Darrow meets Florence, an innocent young woman from the poor slum, and quickly becomes romantically attracted to her. However, Betty, Darrow's snobbish fiancée, soon becomes jealous and invites Florence to a reception - hoping to embarrass her.

But this doesn't work out as he planned, and the gyn soon becomes popular with all the guests present. At the same time, Darrow is pursued by gangster Tony Podessa, a jealous man from Florence's past. As Florence watches the two men confront each other, Tony is killed by a mysterious gunshot. The police arrive and quickly arrest Darrow for the murder, even though he was actually innocent of the crime.

== Cast ==
- Antonio Moreno as David Darrow
- Helene Chadwick as Florence Lamont
- Armand Cortes as Tony Podessa
- Margaret Greene as Betty
- Suzanne Willa as Marie Lacy
- Frank Conlan as Sailor Bill

== Bibliography ==
- Donald W. McCaffrey & Christopher P. Jacobs. Guide to the Silent Years of American Cinema. Greenwood Publishing, 1999.
