= The House of Bondage =

1914 film

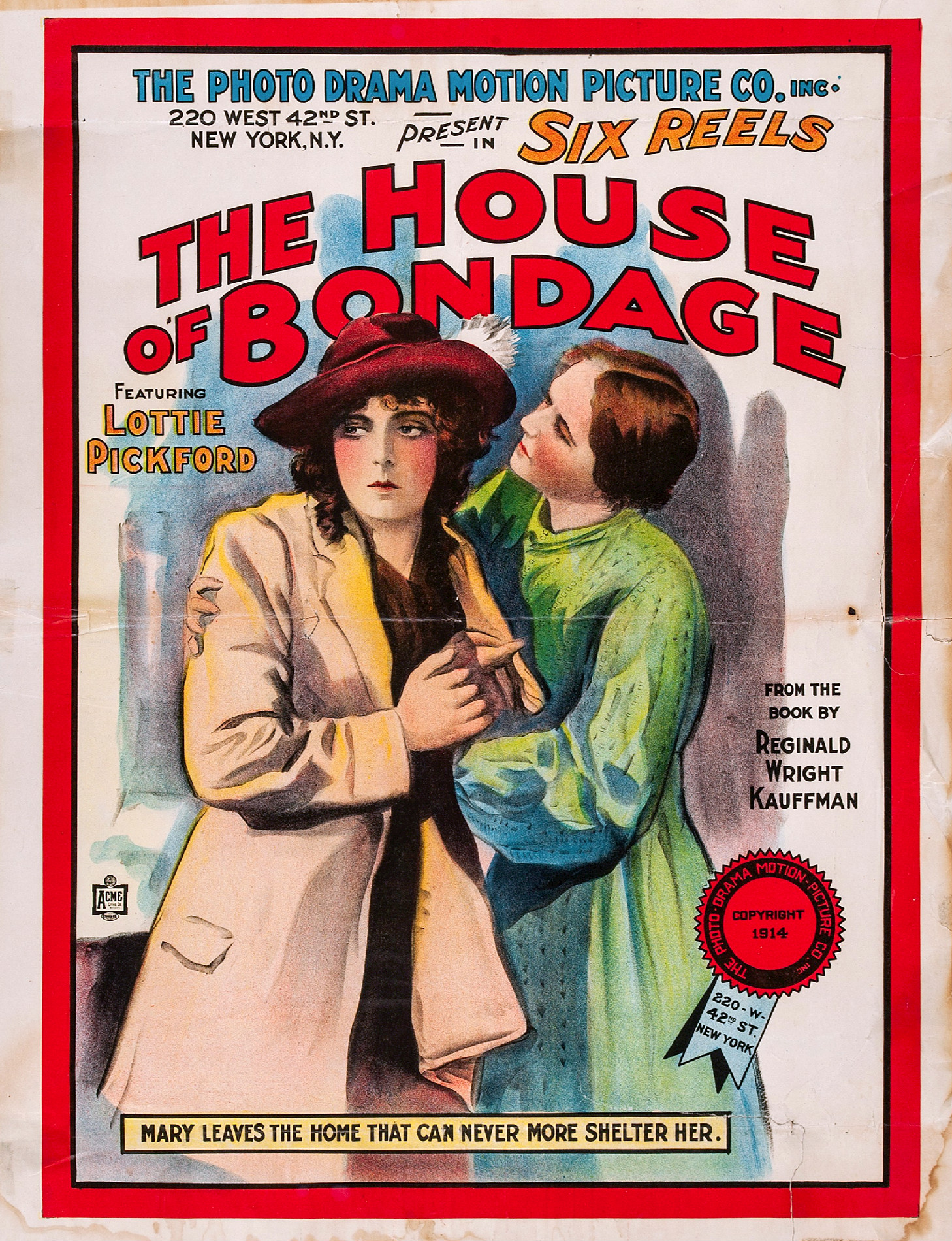
- Film poster
- Directed by: Pierce Kingsley; Raymond B. West
- Written by: Pierce Kingsley
- Based on: The House of Bondage by Reginald Wright Kaufmann
- Produced by: Photo Drama Motion Picture Company; William Steiner
- Starring: Lottie Pickford
- Release date: January 1914
- Running time: 6 reels
- Country: United States
- Languages: Silent, English titles

The House of Bondage is a lost 1914 silent film drama directed by Pierce Kingsley and starring Lottie Pickford.

It was adapted from the novel The House of Bondage by Reginald Wright Kauffman.

In a Motion Picture Magazine interview, Pickford mentioned that she disliked the film.

== Plot ==
This synopsis is taken from the Library of Congress Motion Picture Descriptions Collection.

Max Crossman receives a commission from the notorious Rose Legere. He travels to a small town in Pennsylvania and stays at a run-down hotel. Mary Denbigh, a pretty high school girl, has been disciplined in school for "deficiency in lessons." After school, Mary walks by the hotel and Max, taken by her beauty, follows her. She resents his advances, but Max is persistent.

Mary considers herself to be abused by her parents. While still upset about her homelife, she meets Max again. He entices her with the promise of marriage if she elopes with him.

Max takes Mary to New York City, telling her that they will obtain a marriage license there. Under the pretense of wanting to protect Mary from scandal, he takes her to stay in the home of a woman, whom he claims is a friend of his mother's. Mary comes to realize is that she is now under the control of Rose Legere. It is implied that she has been trafficked and is expected to be a sex worker in Rose's brothel. Mary struggles to escape from bondage, and she seeks respectable employment.

The film presents the argument that girls who have had a religious upbringing are more likely to avoid Mary's situation. Another character, Katie Flanagan, is a poor orphan in New York's East Side. However, she had a strong religious upbringing, which gives her the morality to resist a life of crime.

Mary, meanwhile, falls ill. She continues to try to build a better life for herself. However, respectable society had turned against her, and she struggles to get back on her feet. Without any support from others, she ends up in poverty and turns to a life of crime.

She eventually adopts the alias Bella Nimick, and secures employment in the household of Mrs. Chamberline. However, Mrs. Chamberline's son, Beckman, recognize Mary because he met her while she a sex worker. He fires her to protect his family from scandal.

The despondent Mary longs for vengeance against Max, the man who led her astray, but she is powerless. She continues to live in poverty, and eventually encounters Beckman again. He realizes how serious Mary's situation is and gives her enough money for her to return to Pennsylvania.

Mary comes home, only to learn that her parents have disowned her and won't welcome her back. Returning to New York, Mary asks Rose to employ her in again, but she is turned away. Mary falls down on the street, sobbing, and her fate is left unknown.

== Cast ==
- Lottie Pickford as Mary Denbigh
- Armand Cortes as Max Crossman
- Susanne Willis as Rose Legere
- Robert Lawrence as Wesley Dyker
- Herbert Barrington as Angel
- Vivian De Wolfe as Katie Flannigan
- Miss Bancroft as Mrs. Denbigh
- Brian Darley as Owen Denbigh
- Clyde Morris as Philip Beekman
- Amelia Badarracco as Carrie Berkowitz
- C. Shropshire as Herman Hoffman
- Anna Jordan as Mrs. Chamberline
- Julia Walcott as Big Lou
- Katherine Vaughn as Vivian De Pere
- Gertie Millar as Sallie Denbigh
- Marion Coleman as Cisse, Rose's maid
- De Forrest Dawley as Dyker's clerk
- Fred Nicholls as District Attorney
- Della Buckridge as Mrs. Foot
- Mr. McPhee as Michael
- George Moss as Evangelist
- Mrs. Cortes as Mission lady
- George Ricketts as Doctor
- Miss Nelson as Fritzie
- Miss Crane as Wanda
- Miss Earl as Celeste
- Miss Gormely as New girl
- Gerald King as Bill Stevens

== Lawsuit ==
The Social Uplift Company filed a lawsuit against the Photo Drama Motion Picture Company, claiming that the latter did not hold the motion picture rights to the original Kauffman novel. Social Uplift claimed that they had bought the film rights from Joseph Byron Totten, who had previously bought the dramatic rights. Social Uplift sought to restrain Photo Drama from screening a film based upon the novel. Judge Learned Hand of the United States District Court for the Southern District of New York ruled on February 10, 1914, in favor of Photo Drama. As a result, Photo Drama was free to exhibit The House of Bondage, and Hand's decision held that the motion picture rights to a copyrighted novel are separate from the dramatic rights.
