= Blue Blazes (1926 film) =

1926 film

- Directed by: Joseph Franz; Milburn Morante
- Written by: Frank S. Beresford; Frank C. Robertson
- Produced by: Carl Laemmle
- Starring: Pete Morrison; Jim Welch; Barbara Starr
- Cinematography: Jack Young
- Production company: Universal Pictures
- Distributed by: Universal Pictures
- Release date: March 21, 1926
- Running time: 52 minutes
- Country: United States
- Language: Silent (English intertitles)

Blue Blazes is a 1926 American silent Western film directed by Joseph Franz and Milburn Morante and starring Pete Morrison, Jim Welch, and Barbara Starr.

== Plot ==
As described in a film magazine review, Grace Macy searches for money hidden by her grandfather just before he was killed by thieves. She hears a dying criminal's confession which brands McKeller as the murderer. Buck Fitzgerald offers to help her. Dee Halloran knows that McKeller is innocent. Buck attacks Grace to obtain the confession, but she escapes to Death Wash, where her grandfather's deserted cabin is located, pursued by Buck and his men. Dee comes to the rescue of Grace, locates the missing money, and wins her affection.

== Cast ==
- Pete Morrison as Dee Halloran
- Jim Welch as McKeller
- Barbara Starr as Grace Macy
- Dick La Reno Jr. as Jess Macy
- Les Bates as Buck Fitzgerald
- Jerome La Grasse as Matt Bunker
- James B. Lowe as Rastus

== Reception ==
The magazine, Photoplay, called the film "fair" with "usual riding, shooting, conflict and love" for a western of its time.

== Preservation ==
With no holdings located in archives, Blue Blazes is considered a lost film.
