= The Demon Rider =

1925 film

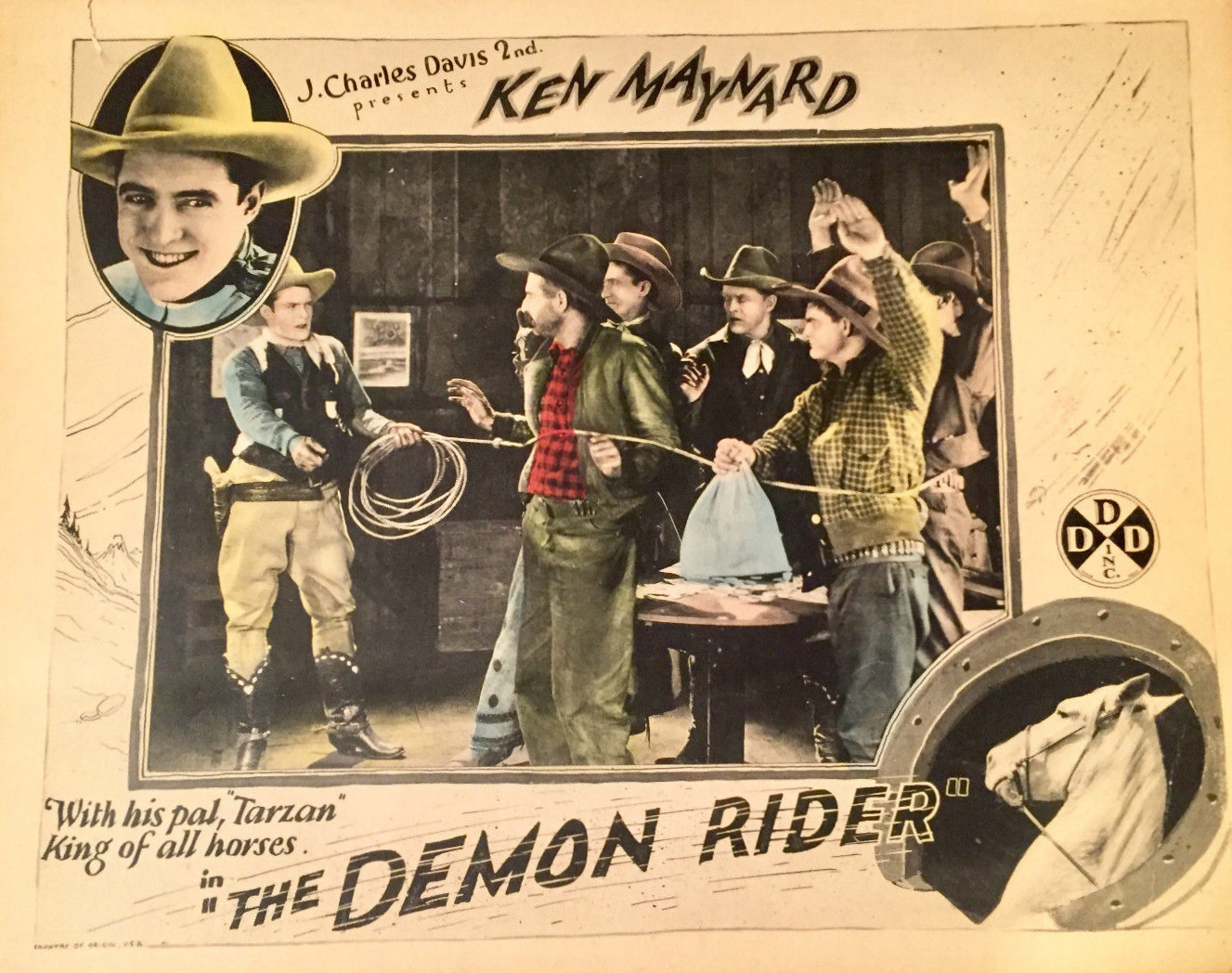
- Lobby card
- Directed by: Paul Hurst
- Story by: Jay Inman Kane
- Produced by: J. Charles Davis
- Starring: Ken Maynard
- Cinematography: Frank Cotner
- Distributed by: Davis Distributing Division
- Release date: November 1925
- Running time: 5 reels
- Country: United States
- Language: Silent (English intertitles)

The Demon Rider is a 1925 American silent Western film directed by Paul Hurst and starring Ken Maynard. It was distributed on a State Rights basis by Davis Distributing (J. Charles Davis).

== Plot ==
As described in a film magazine reviews, Black Hawk and his bandits steal a bag of money from the bank; the foreman of “B” ranch, Billy Dennis, pursues them. While the bandits divide the loot, Billy obtains the bag and makes away with it. He intends to return it to the bank. The sheriff comes upon the bandits, who accuse Billy of being the Black Hawk. Billy loses the bag and is chased by the sheriff. Jim Low, the cook finds the money and starts for his ranch with the thought of returning the money. The Black Hawk gang steals an automobile which they drive over a cliff. Billy is in time to rope the Black Hawk before the crash. It is explained that Billy was trying to restore the money when the cook appears; and everything ends happily.

== Cast ==
- Ken Maynard as Billy Dennis
- Alma Rayford as Mary Bushman
- Fred Burns as Sheriff Jim Lane
- Tom London as Black Hawk
- James B. Lowe as Ranch Cook (credited as James Low)
- Tarzan as Tarzan (horse)
- Hollywood Beauty Sextette as Six Tourists

== Preservation ==
The film is preserved in the Library of Congress and George Eastman Museum Motion Picture Collection.
