= The Palm Beach Girl =

1926 film

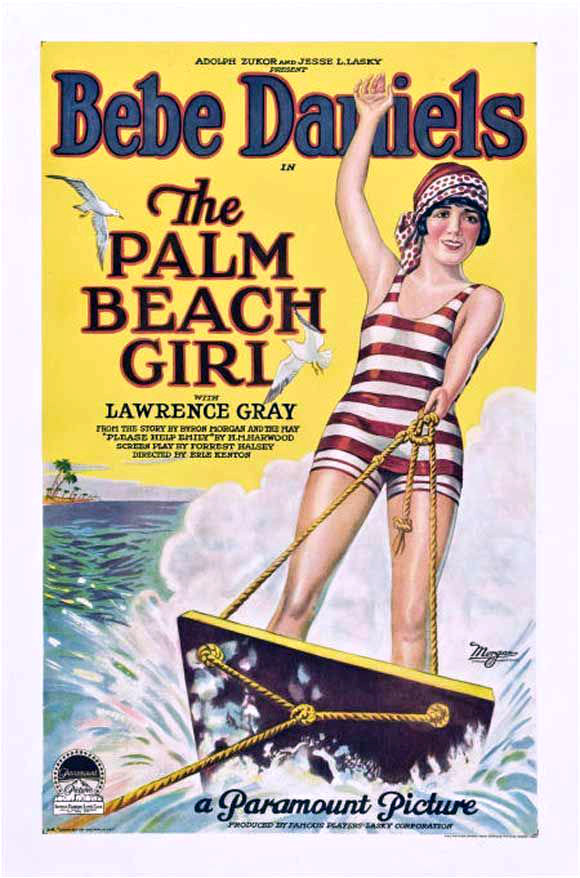
- Film poster
- Directed by: Erle C. Kenton
- Written by: Byron Morgan (adaptation); Forrest Halsey
- Based on: Please Help Emily by Harold Marsh Harwood
- Produced by: Adolph Zukor; Jesse Lasky
- Starring: Bebe Daniels
- Cinematography: Lee Garmes
- Distributed by: Paramount Pictures
- Release date: May 17, 1926
- Running time: 70 minutes; 7 reels
- Country: United States
- Language: Silent (English intertitles)

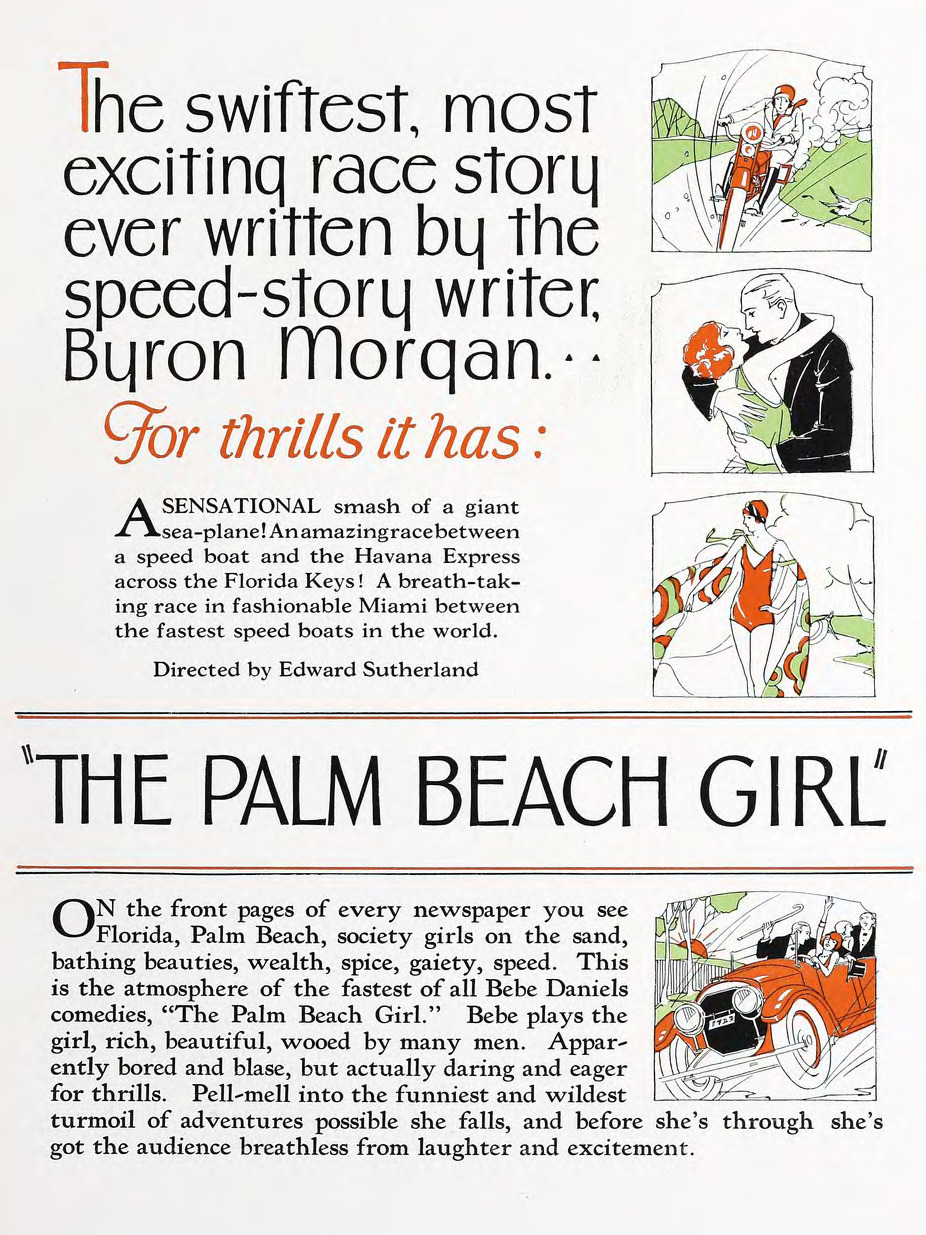
The Palm Beach Girl 1925 advertisement

The Palm Beach Girl is a 1926 American silent romantic comedy film starring Bebe Daniels and directed by Erle C. Kenton. Set in Palm Beach, Florida, it is based upon the short-lived 1916 Broadway play, Please Help Emily, written by H. M. Harwood. The play had previously been adapted to film in 1917 under its original title.

== Plot ==
As described in a film magazine, Emily Bennett, a small town girl, comes to Florida to visit her wealthy aunts Jerry and Beatrice. During the train ride she puts her head out of the window for a better view and becomes covered with soot. Mistaken for a young black woman, she is forced to ride in the racially segregated Jim Crow passenger car. Her aunts are embarrassed when she arrives, but try to help her make a good social impression. Emily tries to help but bungles the christening of playboy Jack Trotter's boat. The young woman discovers some bootleggers transferring a cargo into Jack's speed boat with plans to steal it. She interferes and is pushed into the boat, goes for a wild ride, and is later set adrift. The boat must be back the next day for the races, and Emily has an exciting time endeavoring to manipulate the craft. She gets back in time, operates the boat in the race, and wins it and the affection of Jack.

== Cast ==
- Bebe Daniels as Emily Bennett
- Lawrence Gray as Jack Trotter
- Marguerite Clayton as Julia
- Josephine Drake as Aunt Jerry
- John Patrick as Herbert Moxon (credited as John G. Patrick)
- Armand Cortes as Tug Wilson
- Royal Byron as Sheriff (credited as Roy Byron)
- Maude Turner Gordon as Aunt Beatrice
- Beryl Roberts

== Production ==
The film was shot on location in Florida, specifically at Biscayne Bay, Miami Beach, Palm Beach, and Lake Worth.

== Preservation ==
The Palm Beach Girl is currently presumed lost. In February of 2021, the film was cited by the National Film Preservation Board on their Lost U.S. Silent Feature Films list.
