= James B. Lowe =

American film actor (1880-1963)

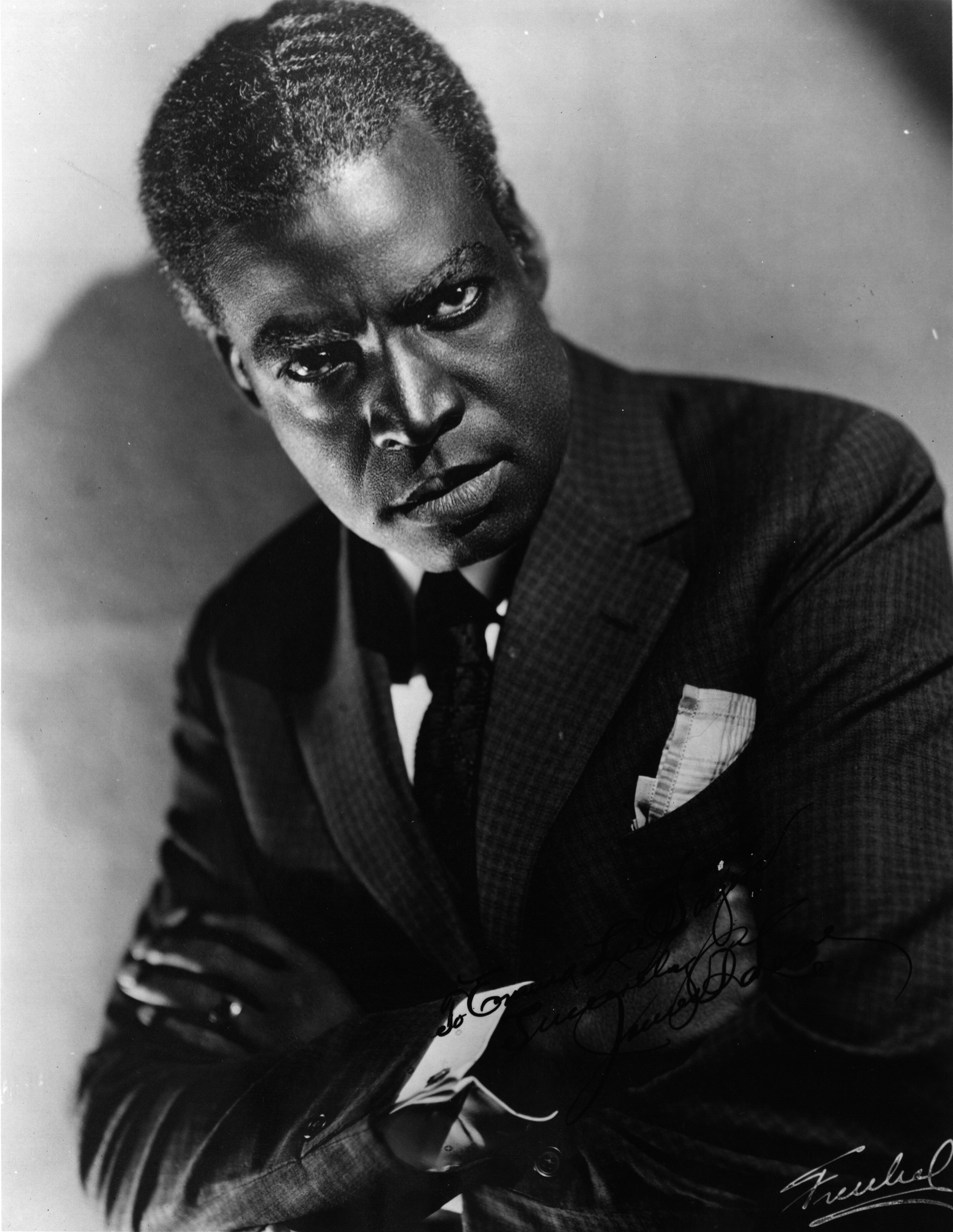
- Lowe, c. 1922
- Born: James Buchanan Lowe; October 10, 1880; Macon, Georgia, USA
- Died: May 19, 1963 (aged 82); Los Angeles, California, USA
- Occupation: Actor

James B. Lowe (1880 –1963) was an American stage and screen actor who was best known for his role in the 1927 silent film adaptation of Uncle Tom's Cabin.

== Biography ==
James was born in Macon, Georgia, to James B. Lowe Sr. and Rachel Burton. As a young man, among other jobs, he reportedly worked as a gold miner in Alaska.

He first began a career as a stage actor before beginning to appear in movies in the mid-1920s. After a few minor roles, he took the lead in Uncle Tom's Cabin after fellow theatre actor Charles Gilpin dropped out of the picture. Although the film — and Lowe's performance — received favorable reviews among the general public at the time of its release, it has since been cited as contributing to defining the Uncle Tom stereotype.

After the success of Uncle Tom's Cabin, he returned to theatrical work, receiving rave notices for his roles in plays such as The South Before the War in Europe. In 1941, after working in Paris for over a decade, he returned to the United States, settling in Los Angeles and setting up shop as a tailor next to the Dunbar Hotel. He died in 1963.

== Filmography ==
- Uncle Tom's Cabin (1927)
- Should Sleepwalkers Marry? (1926)
- Hour of Reckoning (1926)
- Blue Blazes (1926)
- The Demon Rider (1925)
