= Uncle Tom's Cabin (1910 Vitagraph film) =

1910 film by J. Stuart Blackton

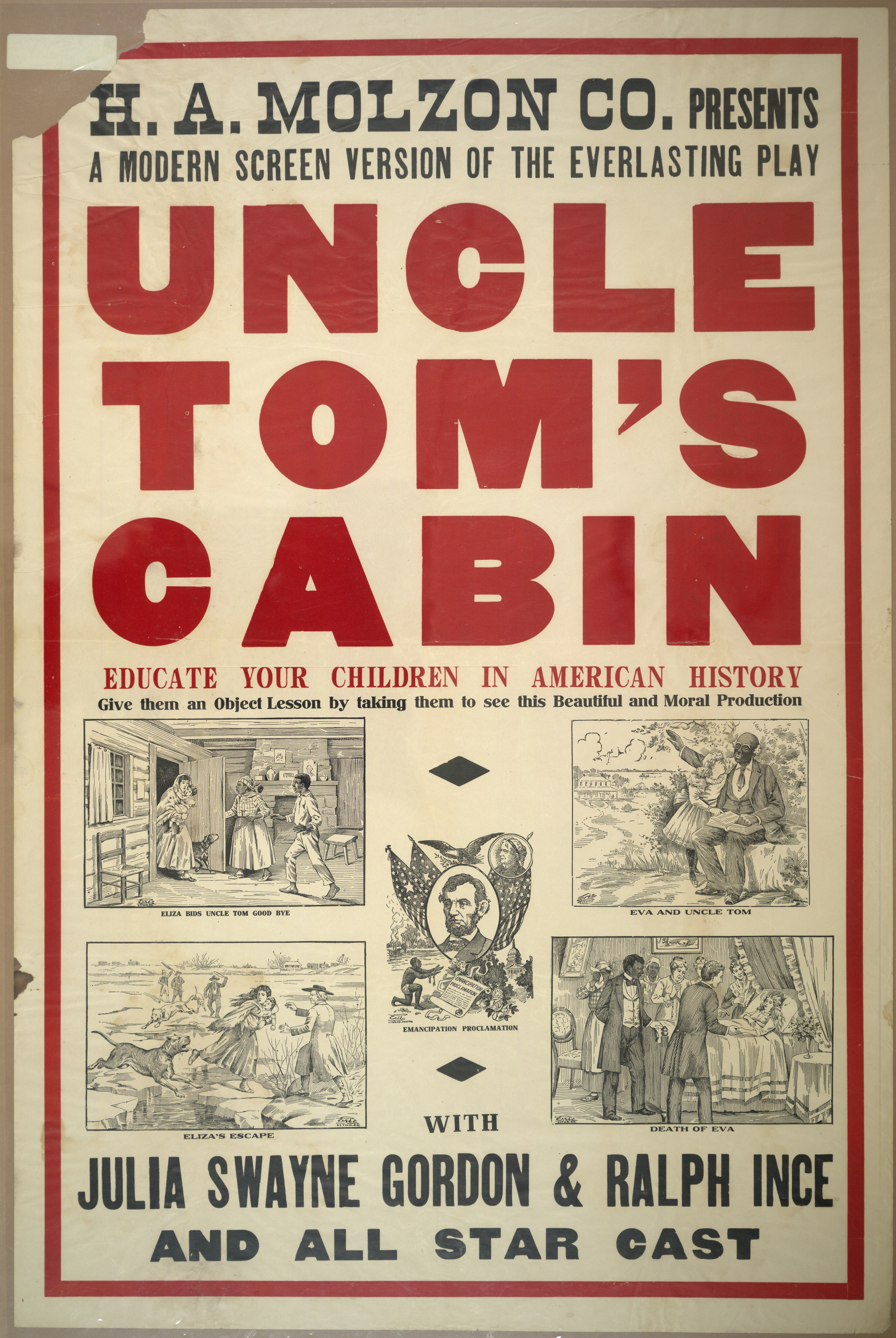
- A surviving film still.
- Directed by: J. Stuart Blackton
- Written by: Harriet Beecher Stowe (Novel); Eugene Mullin & Rollin S. Sturgeon (Scenario)
- Produced by: Vitagraph Studios
- Starring: Florence Turner; Mary Fuller; Edwin R. Phillips; Flora Finch; Genevieve Tobin; Carlyle Blackwell
- Release date: July 26, 1910
- Country: United States
- Languages: Silent film English inter-titles

Uncle Tom's Cabin is a 1910 American silent short drama produced by Vitagraph Studios. The film was adapted from the 1852 novel Uncle Tom's Cabin by Harriet Beecher Stowe. The first reel was released on July 26, 1910, the same day that the Thanhouser Company released their own three-reel version of Uncle Tom's Cabin. This prompted the Thanhouser Company to advertise against the Vitagraph film by referring to the other as being overly drawn out.

The film survives in an incomplete form, and has been released in a restored version as a bonus feature of the Kino release of Uncle Tom's Cabin (1927).

== Release ==
Each of the film's three reels was released on a different day: Tuesday, July 26; Friday, July 29; and Saturday, July 30, 1910.

== Legacy ==
According to Prof. Stephen Railton, "Vitagraph’s 1910 production was the first 'three-reeler.'" This was an innovation over the then-standard "one-reelers," which were roughly 15 minutes long, and "were shown in theaters as part of about an hour's worth of entertainment usually involving a live singer as well as several films."

== See also ==
- List of American films of 1910
- List of incomplete or partially lost films
