= Mona Ray =

American actress

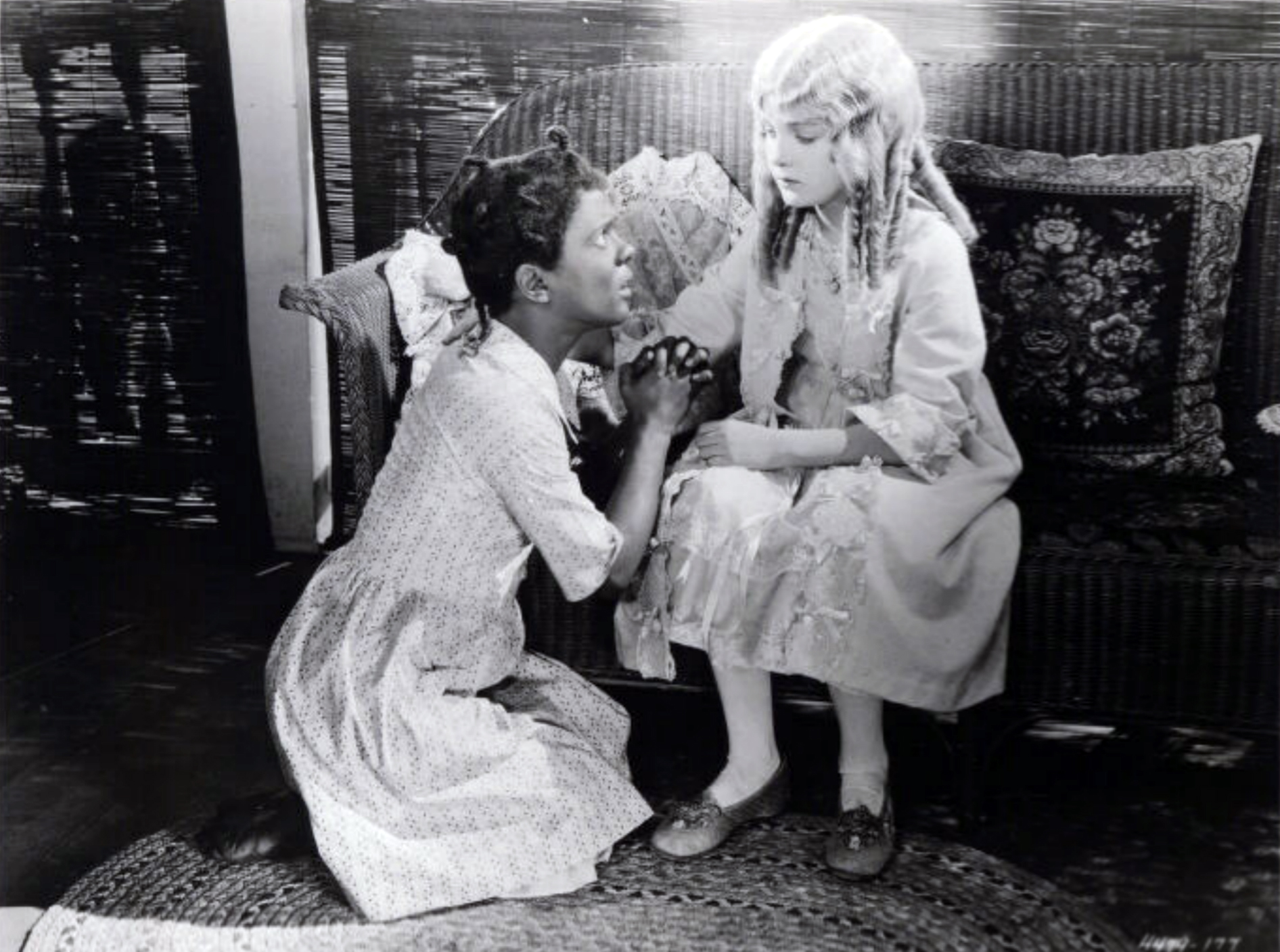
- Still from Uncle Tom's Cabin (1927) with Ray at left
- Born: January 17, 1905
- Died: July 3, 1986 (aged 81)
- Occupation(s): Stage, film actress

Mona Ray (January 17, 1905 – July 3, 1986) was an American stage and screen actress from the late 1920s to the early 1940s. Her most famous role was an appearance in black face as the mischievous slave Topsy in the 1927 silent film Uncle Tom's Cabin. During the 1930s, she starred in a number of musical/comedy films; she also appeared as Mammy Yokum in the 1940 version of Li'l Abner. She last appeared on the Broadway stage in 1942.

Ray was born Mona Kelly in New York according to the California Death Index, though some references refer to her birthplace as Pittsburgh, Pennsylvania. She married scene writer and dialog director Hugh J. Cummings in the late 1920s. In May 1945, Cummings was awarded a legal separation from Ray on charges of cruelty and adultery. He alleged that she had spent an evening with her brother-in-law, Josef Montiague (husband of her sister, actress Judy King) in only a "tightly clad sweater". Differences must have been resolved, however, as Ray remained with Cummings until his death of a heart attack in April, 1953 at the age of 69. Ray married a second time to Raymond A. Pestana, and continued her life as a housewife along with being involved in various organizations including the Film Welfare League, Inc. Ray died in Nevada on July 3, 1986. Her second husband, Raymond, followed her in death in October 1987.

== Partial filmography ==
- 1927 Uncle Tom's Cabin as Topsy
- 1930 Half-Pint Polly as Half-Pint Polly
- 1930 Pardon My Gun as Peggy Martin
- 1940 Li'l Abner as Mammy Yokum
