= Uncle Tom's Cabin (1910 Thanhouser film) =

1910 film by Barry O'Neil

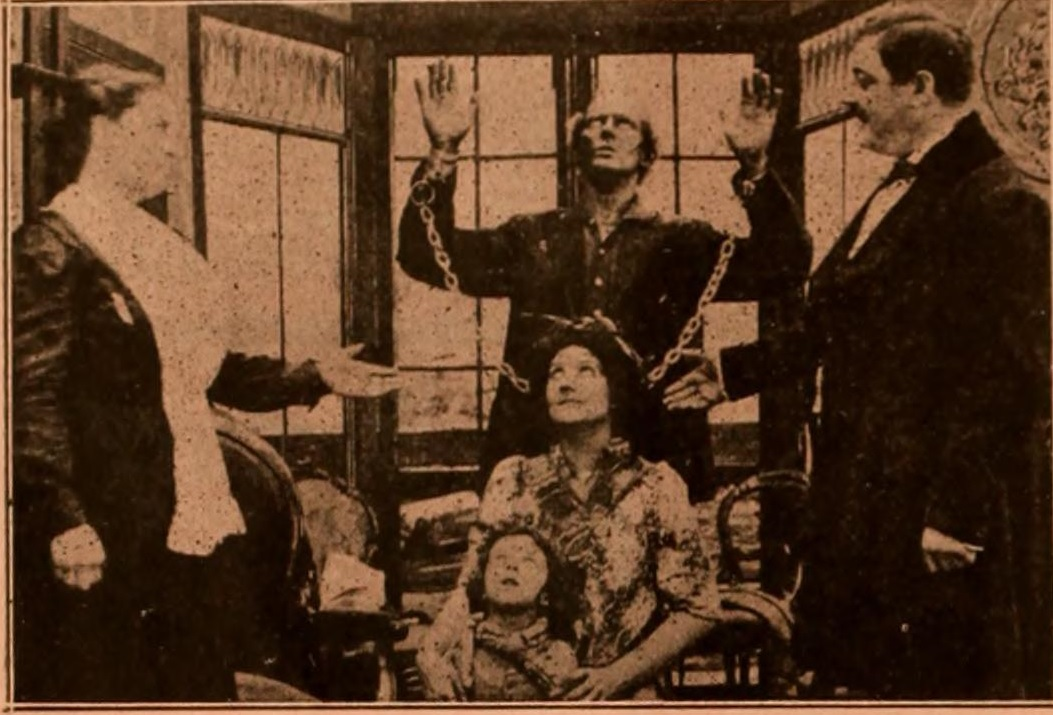
- A surviving film still.
- Directed by: Barry O'Neil
- Produced by: Thanhouser Company
- Release date: July 26, 1910
- Country: United States
- Languages: Silent film English intertitles

Uncle Tom's Cabin is a 1910 American silent short drama produced by the Thanhouser Company. The film was adapted from the 1852 novel Uncle Tom's Cabin by Harriet Beecher Stowe. The plot of the Thanhouser production streamlined the actual story to portray the film over the course of a single reel. The film was released on July 26, 1910, on the same day that Vitagraph released the first reel of their own three reel version of Uncle Tom's Cabin. This prompted the Thanhouser Company to advertise against the Vitagraph film by referring to the other as being overly drawn out. The film garnered mixed, but mostly positive reception in trade publications. The film is presumed lost. (Note: Some sources erroneously claim this film is extant while the Vitagraph version is not. One such source is Nineteenth-century Women at the Movies: Adapting Classic Women's Fiction to Film. There is no known surviving print of the Thanhouser Production, in full or in part.)

== Plot ==
Though the film is presumed lost, a synopsis survives in The Moving Picture World from July 30, 1910. It states: "The story opens in winter when Mr. Shelby has to sell some of his slaves due to business problems. Until this time they have lived all their lives with him, and he has been noted for his kindness to them.... Unfortunately the person to whom he was compelled to sell is the slave owner of the other sort, brutal, heartless, and a hard master - Simon Legree. Legree agrees to buy as many slaves as he desires, provided that Mr. Shelby gives him his choice. The slaves are passed and reviewed, and Legree selects Uncle Tom, one of the oldest and trusted, and the young son of Eliza, also a slave who has been with Shelby for many years. Despite the protestations of Mr. Shelby and the entreaties of the slaves themselves, these two are heartlessly taken from their homes and families. Legree refuses to buy any of the others, and as Shelby needs immediate money, he is forced to sell these two. The small boy is torn from his mother's arms and placed in Uncle Tom's care to be taken with him to Legree's plantation. But Uncle Tom cannot resist a mother's pleading, and when Eliza entreats him to give her back her child he does so and aids her to escape with him."

"For this deed he is beaten by Legree and forced to join the bloodhounds in which Legree institutes to recover the slave. Eliza, with her boy in her arms, escapes over the Kentucky border to Ohio, a free state, making a perilous crossing on one block of ice to another on the Ohio River. Terribly overcome by the cold and faint from exposure, Eliza is carried unconscious to the home of Senator Bird of Ohio. Tracked down by the purchaser, Simon Legree, to Bird's home, Mr. Bird out of goodness buys the boy and, giving him his freedom, gives him to his mother. Uncle Tom is not fortunate enough to find another purchaser and is taken by Legree to the plantation in Mississippi, finding on the trip that the new owner has taken a dislike to him and treats him with great brutality."

During his journey, while waiting for a Mississippi steamboat, Uncle Tom first meets little Eva, who with her father is also taking the boat south. Tom is at once attracted to the beautiful little girl, and she in turn talks to the kindly old darkey. While looking at the boats, the little one accidentally falls into the swiftly flowing river and escapes drowning only through the bravery of Uncle Tom. He of all the crowd has the courage to jump in and rescue the little girl. Eva's father to reward Tom for his bravery, buys him from Legree, and once more Tom knows what it is to be treated kindly. He lives happily as little Eva's special bodyguard until the little one is seized with a sudden sickness and dies. She had become greatly attached to Uncle Tom, and the last act of her life was to present him with a little locket containing her picture. Once more Uncle Tom is sold and again falls into the hands of Simon Legree. He is taken to Legree's plantation in Mississippi, where he is overworked and ill-treated to the point of death. Just before he dies he presses to his lips the locket with the picture of his beloved little girl and in a vision sees her in the clouds holding out her arms to him that he, too, may enter with her the pearly gates, inside of which all souls are equal, and all free. The comedy of the story is furnished by little Eva's Aunt Ophelia, a queer old lawyer named Marx, and his stubborn donkey, to say nothing of Topsy, a wicked little colored girl, who Aunt Ophelia tries hard to convert."

== Cast ==
- Frank H. Crane as Uncle Tom
- Anna Rosemond as Eliza
- Marie Eline as Little Eva
- Florence Turner as Topsy

== Production ==
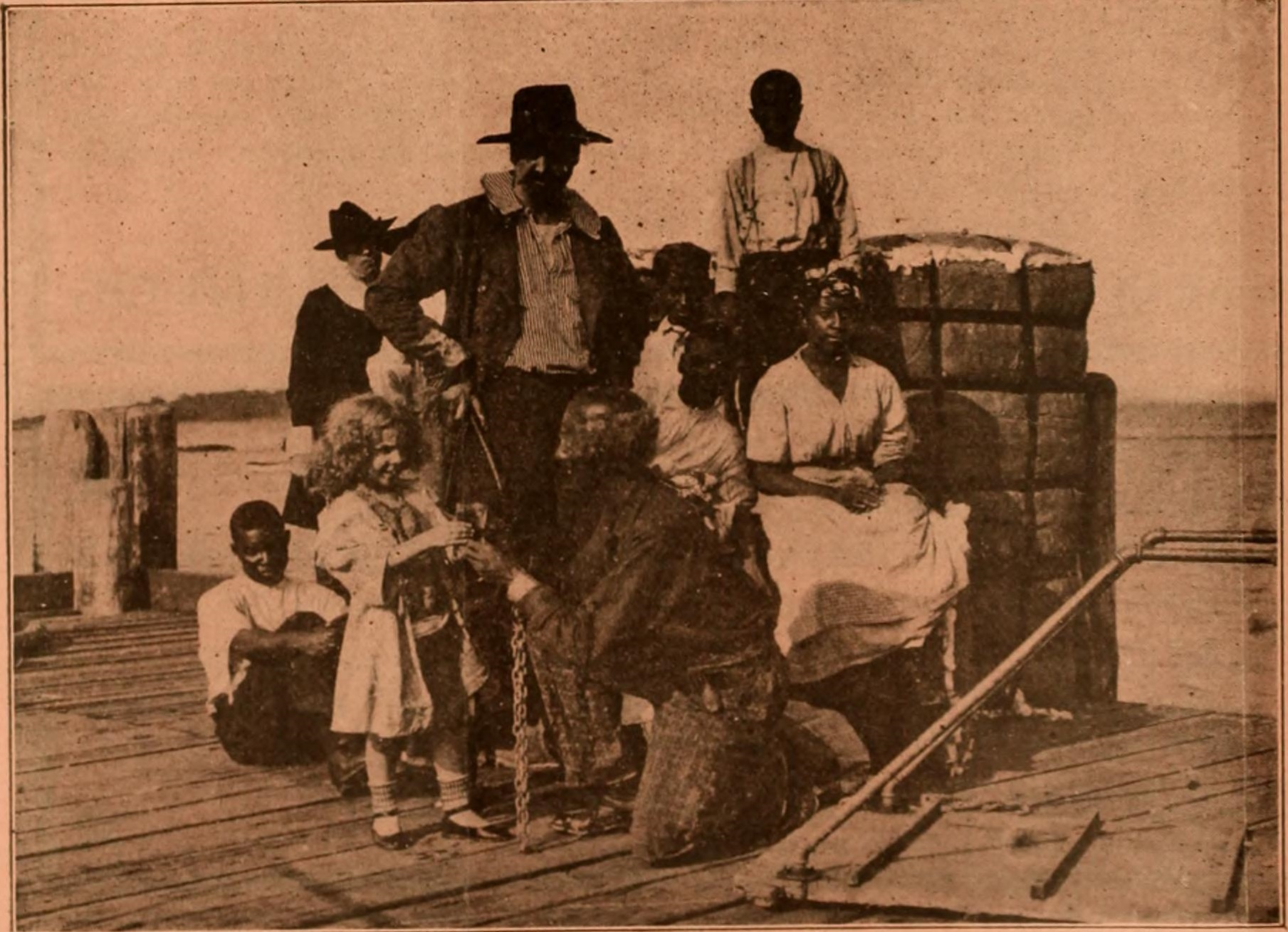
Another surviving film still

The 1852 publication of Uncle Tom's Cabin by Harriet Beecher Stowe was the best-selling novel of the 19th century and the second best-selling book of that century, following the Bible. It is credited with helping fuel the abolitionist cause in the 1850s. The writer of the adapted scenario is unknown, but it was most likely Lloyd Lonergan. He was an experienced newspaperman employed by The New York Evening World while writing scripts for the Thanhouser productions. The director of the film was Barry O'Neil, whose real name was Thomas J. McCarthy. He would direct many important Thanhouser pictures, including its first two-reeler, Romeo and Juliet.

Marie Eline, popularly known as "The Thanhouser Kid" played the role of Little Eva. Marie Eline would also play this role in the five-reel World Film Corporation version of Uncle Tom's Cabin, released on August 10, 1914. The role of Eliza was played by Anna Rosemond, one of two leading ladies of the Thanhouser company in this era. Frank H. Crane, cast in the role of Tom, was a leading male actor of the company. Crane was also involved in the very beginnings of the Thanhouser Company and would later become a director at Thanhouser. Surviving film stills, from advertisements in Moving Picture World, show Crane in blackface in order to portray the part of Uncle Tom. The other players in the production are uncredited because their identities are unknown. Bowers states that most of the credits are fragmentary for 1910 Thanhouser productions. The cast and credits of this film are sometimes erroneously given because of confusion with other films of the same name. Robert K. Klepper, Silent Films, 1877-1996: A Critical Guide to 646 Movies, misidentifies the Thanhouser release as "Thanhouser/Minot" and lists the director as William Robert Daly. The 1914 Minot Films Inc. release was not produced by Thanhouser.

== Release and reception ==
The one reel drama, approximately 1,000 feet long, was released on July 26, 1910. The release of the film fell on the same date of Vitagraph's Uncle Tom's Cabin. Vitagraph had previously released multi-reel works, but a three reel drama was considered a bold innovation by The New York Dramatic Mirror. The Mirror article stated the multi-reel release was risky because Pathé's two reel adaptation of Drink was not followed by other two reel releases. The sudden competition prompted Thanhouser to advertise against Vitagraph's production in The Moving Picture World by declaring the three reel film as being overly drawn out and that audiences could get the full story in a single reel from Thanhouser. Edward Wagenknecht, author of The Movies in the Age of Innocence, refers to Thanhouser advertising against a two reel version with, "You can see the whole thing in one reel - why buy two?" This is actually an erroneous reference to the three reel Vitagraph version by Edwin Thanhouser that was published in The Moving Picture World on March 10, 1917. (Note: This reference is composed of three separate links. The attribution of the quote to Edwin Thanhouser is confirmed by Bowers in the narrative history of the Thanhouser Encyclopedia. The erroneous two-reel reference is resolved by Q. David Bowers in a footnote. The citation for the publication and date in which the error appears is given in another separate footnote.) H. Philip Bolton, author of Women Writers Dramatized: A Calendar of Performances from Narrative Works Published in English to 1900, would identify the Thanhouser and Vitagraph release, but is unable to identify and attribute the directorial and casting credits to the productions. A third 1910 adaptation, also named Uncle Tom's Cabin, release by Pathé is cited in The Complete Index to Literary Sources in Film. According to Bowers, most Thanhouser posters of this era were of one-sheet size, but an additional six-sheet format poster was created for Uncle Tom's Cabin. The film likely had a wide national release, but specific identification of the Thanhouser film is muddied by the prevalence of Vitagraph's production and stage plays. Two advertisements in Indiana and Kansas specifically note that the film to be shown will be the Thanhouser production.

By the time of the film's release, the quality of the Thanhouser films in general stood out amongst the Independent producers. An editorial by "The Spectator" in the Mirror contained specific praise for Thanhouser productions by stating, "...practically all other Independent American companies, excepting Thanhouser, show haste and lack of thought in their production. Crude stories are crudely handled, giving the impression that they are rushed through in a hurry - anything to get a thousand feet of negative ready for the market. Such pictures, of course, do not cost much to produce, but they are not of a class to make reputation. The Thanhouser company, alone of the Independents, shows a consistent effort to do things worthwhile..." The editorial was written by Frank E. Woods of the American Biograph Company, a Licensed company, and like the publication itself had a considerable slant to the Licensed companies.

Still, the film received mixed praise from trade publications. The Mirror commended the film for the clever adaptation which preserved coherency in the story, the good acting and adequate costuming despite a few flaws in the production. Among the errors highlighted by the Mirror was Eliza's ice scene and another scene where the black actors wore inaccurate attire such as a laborer who wore a fine shirt and tie. The Morning Telegraph reviewer did not care for the production much, finding issues with the adaptation, the acting and the scenes. The Moving Picture News was more positive in its review, praising the photography and the sensible adaptation of the book to the film format. Three different reviews in The Moving Picture World were published, each of which were positive. In contrast to the fault found in the Mirror, one of the reviewers specifically praised the ice scene by stating, "This part of the picture seems to have been conceived and carried out with extraordinary realism. You see the snow falling, the ice floes cracking and moving, you felt the danger that the woman and child were running as they made their escape across the ice, pursued by their remorseless enemy through the blinding snowstorm. This is one of the finest effects I have seen on the moving picture screen, and the whole story, so far as I have seen it, is worked out with wonderful realism, effect and verisimilitude. It's as good a rendering of the subject as I have ever seen, and I have seen Uncle Tom's Cabin played several times." The Leavenworth Times of Leavenworth, Kansas had an article reviewing the production and offered much praise for adaptation.

== See also ==
- List of American films of 1910
