= Uncle Tom's Cabin (1927 film) =

1927 film

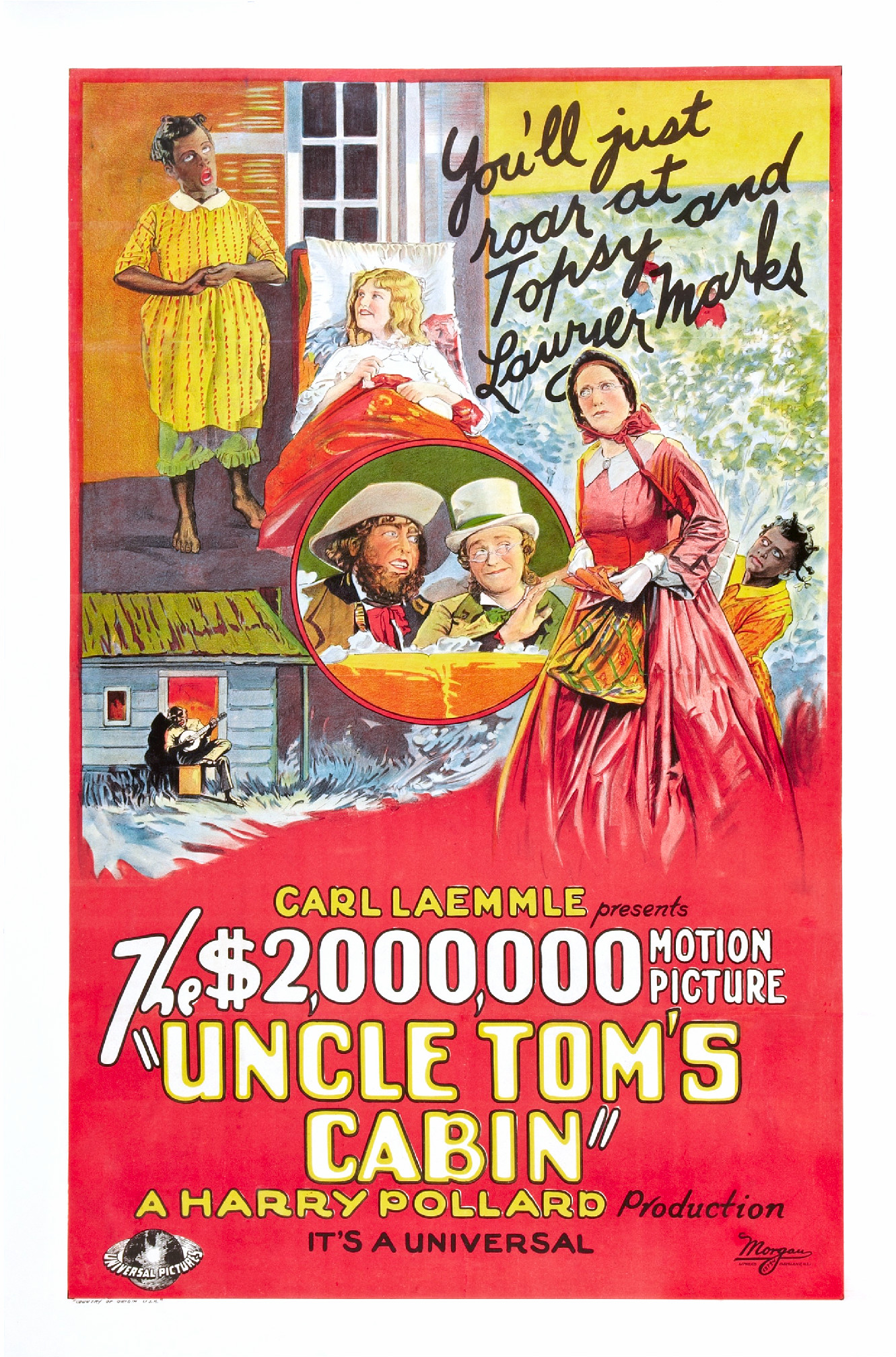
- Film poster
- Directed by: Harry A. Pollard
- Written by: Harvey F. Thew (continuity); A. P. Younger (continuity); Walter Anthony (intertitles)
- Based on: Uncle Tom's Cabin by Harriet Beecher Stowe
- Produced by: Carl Laemmle
- Starring: Margarita Fischer; Arthur Edmund Carewe; George Siegmann; James B. Lowe
- Cinematography: Charles Stumar; Jacob Kull
- Edited by: Gilmore Walker; Daniel Mandell; Byron Robinson; Ted Kent
- Music by: Erno Rapee; Hugo Riesenfeld (1928 re-release in Movietone)
- Production company: Universal Studios
- Distributed by: Universal Pictures
- Release dates: November 4, 1927 (Silent version); September 2, 1928 (Sound version)
- Running time: 112 minutes (13 reels)
- Country: United States
- Languages: Sound (Synchronized) (English Intertitles)

Uncle Tom's Cabin is a 1927 American synchronized sound drama film directed by Harry A. Pollard and released by Universal Pictures. While the film has no audible dialog, it was released with a synchronized musical score with sound effects using the Western Electric sound-on-film process. The film is based on the 1852 novel Uncle Tom's Cabin by Harriet Beecher Stowe and was the last version filmed without audible dialogue. This film is important historically as being Universal's first sound feature.

In this version of the film, all of the major slave roles, with the exception of Uncle Tom himself, were portrayed by white actors. Actress Mona Ray played the slave Topsy in blackface while the slaves Eliza, George, Cassie, and Harry were all presented as having very light skin coloring because of mixed-race heritage. This film was released on DVD in 1999 by Kino.

The film was re-released in 1958 with sound added and narration by Raymond Massey.

== Plot ==
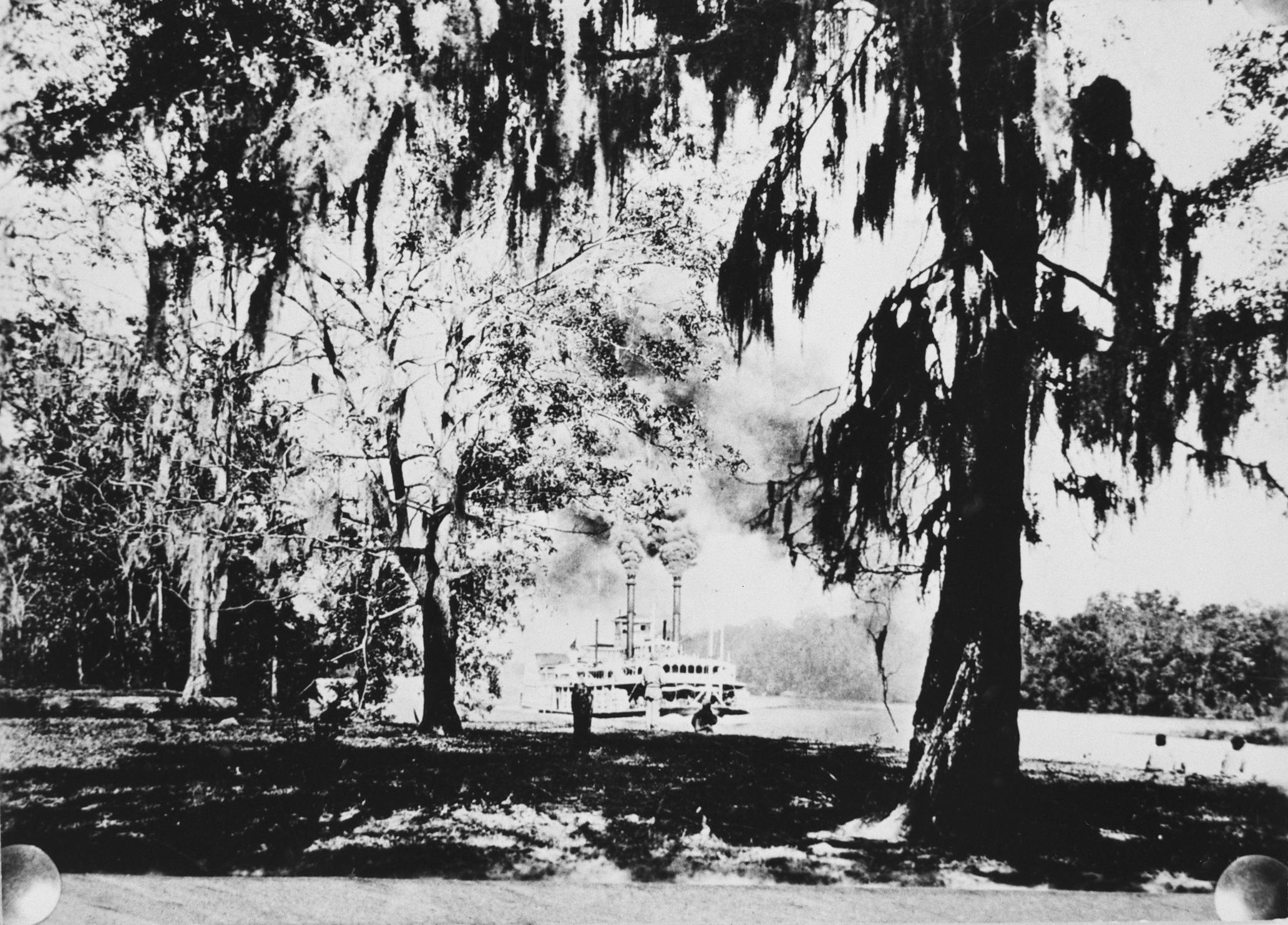
A still from the movie featuring the steamboat Kate Adams, refashioned and renamed La Belle Riviere for the film

Full film with synchronized sound

At the elegant Kentucky mansion of the Shelbys, a well-regarded Southern family, preparations are underway for the wedding of one of their most beloved slaves, Eliza (Margarita Fischer), an attractive young mulatto woman purchased by the Shelbys as a child in New Orleans. Eliza is to marry George Harris (Arthur Edmund Carewe), a light-skinned mulatto and brilliant inventor, currently the property of a neighbor but working in Mr. Shelby's hemp factory. Shelby has promised to buy George and free him.

The wedding becomes a social highlight, arranged by Mrs. Shelby (Vivien Oakland), and all seems promising until George's cruel master, Edward Harris, arrives and forcibly reclaims him. Despite the Shelbys' protests and offers to buy him, Harris refuses and drives George away under the lash.

Five years pass. Shelby has sunk deeper into debt, primarily to slave trader Tom Haley (Adolph Milar). On the night Haley comes to collect on the debt, Shelby attempts to delay with a payment sent via his loyal slave Uncle Tom (James B. Lowe). Though Tom returns with the money just in time, Shelby's financial situation worsens, and eventually, he agrees to sell both Tom and Eliza's young son, Harry (Lassie Lou Ahern), to Haley.

That same night, George, ordered by Harris to marry another slave woman and told that slave marriages have no legal standing, flees in despair. After a sorrowful farewell, he disappears into the snowy woods, hoping to cross the Ohio River to freedom.

Meanwhile, Eliza overhears the plan to sell Tom and Harry. Desperate to save her son, she packs hurriedly and stops at Uncle Tom's cabin to warn him. Aunt Chloe (Gertrude Howard), Tom's wife, watches tearfully as Eliza departs. Tom refuses to run, hoping to remain faithful and protect his family. Eliza escapes through the snowy woods with Harry, unknowingly passing George along the way, and takes refuge at a riverside inn.

There, she is spotted by Lawyer Marks (Lucien Littlefield) and his partner Tom Loker (J. Gordon Russell), opportunistic slave catchers. When Haley and Harris arrive with bloodhounds, Eliza makes a daring escape by jumping across floating ice chunks on the Ohio River, finally reaching the far bank with the help of Phineas Fletcher, a kindly Quaker, and his wife Ruth.

Despite the Quakers’ efforts, Eliza and Harry are recaptured due to the Dred Scott decision. Marks and Loker reclaim them legally.

Meanwhile, Tom is taken away by Haley, bidding a heart-wrenching goodbye to Chloe and his three children. George, learning of Eliza's capture, begins a desperate search. He secures work as a stoker on the steamboat Belle Riviere, where Haley boards with Tom in chains—and later, Marks and Loker arrive with Eliza and Harry.

Eliza and Tom briefly reunite and share their stories. Marks and Loker sell Harry to Mr. Johnson, a slave dealer. In grief, Eliza tries to leap overboard, but Tom prevents her.

Also aboard are Augustine St. Clare (John Roche), his gentle young daughter Eva (Virginia Grey), and their cousin, the stern and pious Miss Ophelia (Aileen Manning) from Vermont. Eva is drawn to Tom's kindness. He entertains her with peach-stone toys and songs, and she begs her father to buy him. St. Clare agrees and purchases Tom from Haley.

Now owned by the St. Clares in New Orleans, Tom lives peacefully under their roof. Eva and Tom form a deep spiritual bond. Meanwhile, Miss Ophelia, tasked with managing the household, struggles to discipline the wild and mischievous slave girl Topsy (Mona Ray), whom St. Clare has whimsically brought home. Topsy lies and steals without remorse, frustrating Miss Ophelia. Only Eva treats her kindly, telling her, “I love you if nobody else does.” Topsy is gradually transformed by Eva's affection.

As Eva's health fails, her father, mother, Miss Ophelia, Topsy, and Tom gather at her bedside. When Eva dies, her loss devastates them—especially St. Clare, who soon dies of grief. With both protectors gone, the household's slaves are sent to auction.

At the New Orleans slave market, Simon Legree (George Siegmann), a brutal plantation owner from Georgia, buys Uncle Tom. In another section of the market, Eliza—after months of hiding—is being sold. Tom recognizes her and reacts. Legree notices this and buys her too.

At Legree's plantation, Tom is forbidden from praying or reading the Bible. He endures savage beatings. Cassie (Eulalie Jensen), a beautiful mulatto woman who has long been Legree's victim, sees Eliza's arrival as a threat. Yet upon learning Eliza's story, she realizes Eliza is her long-lost daughter, whom she believed had been sold to a family named Shelby.

Determined to save her daughter from a fate like her own, Cassie deceives Legree into letting her take Eliza away under the pretense of punishment. That night, she and Eliza escape through a window and hide in the toolhouse with Tom. They are spotted, but slip back into the attic unnoticed while Legree violently interrogates Tom, who refuses to betray them.

Legree, drunk and raging, sends Sambo and Quimbo, his overseers, to beat Tom senseless. Upstairs, the sound of howling wind and eerie visions of Tom terrify Legree. When he and his men storm the attic, Cassie and Eliza defend themselves in a fierce fight. As Legree grapples with Cassie, he sees a ghostly image of Tom leading him to the attic window—through which he falls to his death.

Eliza cries for help from the attic. Among the passing Northern refugees is Mr. Johnson, with little Harry, now reunited with George Harris, who had tracked them. Soldiers hear Eliza's cries. Sambo and Quimbo, shaken by Tom's dying forgiveness, urge the soldiers to intervene.

The troops rescue Eliza and Cassie, and a joyful reunion occurs as George, Eliza, and their son are finally reunited, free at last.

== Cast ==
- Margarita Fischer as Eliza
- James B. Lowe as Uncle Tom
- Arthur Edmund Carewe as George Harris
- George Siegmann as Simon Legree
- Eulalie Jensen as Cassie
- Mona Ray as Topsy
- Virginia Grey as Eva St. Clare
- Lassie Lou Ahern as Little Harry
- Lucien Littlefield as Lawyer Marks
- Adolph Milar as Mr. Tom Haley
- J. Gordon Russell as Tom Loker
- Gertrude Howard as Aunt Chloe, (Uncle Tom's wife)
- Jack Mower as Mr. Shelby
- Vivien Oakland as Mrs. Shelby
- John Roche as Augustine St. Clare
- Aileen Manning as Aunt Ophelia

Unbilled

- Tom Amardares – Quimbo
- Gertrude Astor – Mrs. St. Clare
- Grace Carlyle – Mrs. Fletcher
- Matthew Beard – Child
- Louise Beavers – Slave at Wedding
- William Dyer – G.M. Beard – Auctioneer
- Francis Ford – Captain
- Eugene Jackson – Child
- Carla Laemmle – Auction Spectator
- Jeanette Loff – Auction Spectator
- Nelson McDowell – Phineas Fletcher
- Rolfe Sedan – Adolph
- Madame Sul-Te-Wan – Slave at Wedding
- Dick Sutherland – Sambo
- Clarence Wilson – Bidder at Eliza's Auction

== Production ==
The title role was originally played by the notable stage actor Charles Gilpin, but he quit amid onset dissatisfaction with the depiction of the role and was replaced by James B. Lowe, re-shooting the scenes already filmed with Gilpin. Uncle Tom's Cabin was partially shot on location in Plattsburg, New York.

== Preservation ==
A print of Uncle Tom's Cabin is preserved at the Library of Congress.

== See also ==
- List of films featuring slavery
- List of early sound feature films (1926–1929)
