= List of Western films of the 1940s =

A list of Western films released in the 1940s.

Title	Director	Cast	Country	Subgenre/Notes
1940
20 Mule Team	Richard Thorpe	Wallace Beery, Anne Baxter, Leo Carrillo	United States	mining Western
Adventures of Red Ryder	William Witney	Don "Red" Barry, Noah Beery Sr.	United States	Red Ryder serial Western
Arizona	Wesley Ruggles	Jean Arthur, William Holden	United States	traditional Western
Bad Man from Red Butte	Ray Taylor	Johnny Mack Brown, Bob Baker, Fuzzy Knight	United States	B Western
Beyond the Sacramento	Lambert Hillyer	Wild Bill Elliott, Evelyn Keyes, Dub Taylor	United States	B Western
Billy the Kid's Gun Justice	Sam Newfield	Bob Steele, Al St. John, Louise Currie	United States	Billy the Kid serial Western
Billy the Kid in Texas	Sam Newfield	Bob Steele, Al St. John, Terry Walker	United States	Billy the Kid serial Western
Billy the Kid Outlawed	Sam Newfield	Bob Steele, Al St. John, Louise Currie	United States	Billy the Kid serial Western
Blazing Six Shooters	Joseph H. Lewis	Charles Starrett, Iris Meredith, Dick Curtis	United States	B Western
The Border Legion	Joseph Kane	Roy Rogers, George "Gabby" Hayes	United States	Singing cowboy Western
Boss of Bullion City	Ray Taylor	Johnny Mack Brown, Fuzzy Knight, Nell O'Day	United States	B Western
Brigham Young	Henry Hathaway	Tyrone Power, Linda Darnell, John Carradine	United States	traditional Western
Buck Benny Rides Again	Mark Sandrich	Jack Benny, Ellen Drew, Andy Devine, Ward Bond	United States	comedy Western
Bullets for Rustlers	Sam Nelson	Charles Starrett, Lorna Gray, Bob Nolan	United States	B Western
Carson City Kid	Joseph Kane	Roy Rogers, George "Gabby" Hayes	United States	Singing cowboy Western
Carolina Moon	Frank McDonald	Gene Autry, Smiley Burnette, June Storey	United States	Singing cowboy Western
Colorado	Joseph Kane	Roy Rogers, George "Gabby" Hayes, Milburn Stone	United States	Singing cowboy Western
Covered Wagon Days	George Sherman	Robert Livingston, Raymond Hatton, Duncan Renaldo	United States	The Three Mesquiteers serial Western
The Dark Command	Raoul Walsh	John Wayne, Claire Trevor, Walter Pidgeon	United States	traditional Western
Deadwood Dick	James W. Horne	Don Douglas, Lorna Gray, Harry Harvey	United States	serial Western
The Durango Kid	Lambert Hillyer	Charles Starrett, Luana Walters, Kenneth MacDonald	United States	B Western
The Fargo Kid	Edward Killy	Tim Holt, Ray Whitley, Emmett Lynn	United States	B Western
Gaucho Serenade	Frank McDonald	Gene Autry, Smiley Burnette	United States	Singing cowboy Western
The Gay Caballero	Otto Brower	Cesar Romero, Chris-Pin Martin, Sheila Ryan	United States	The Cisco Kid serial Western
Ghost Valley Raiders	George Sherman	Don "Red" Barry, Lona Andre, LeRoy Mason, Tom London	United States	traditional western
Girl of the Golden West	Carl Koch	Michel Simon, Isa Pola, Rossano Brazzi, Valentina Cortese	Italy	fascist era Spaghetti Western
Go West	Edward Buzzell	Groucho Marx, Harpo Marx, Chico Marx	United States	comedy Western
Granny Get Your Gun	George Amy	May Robson, Harry Davenport, Margot Stevenson, Hardie Albright	United States	comedy Western
Heroes of the Saddle	William Witney	Robert Livingston, Raymond Hatton, Duncan Renaldo	United States	The Three Mesquiteers serial Western
Hidden Gold	Lesley Selander	William Boyd, Russell Hayden	United States	Hopalong Cassidy serial Western
The Howards of Virginia	Frank Lloyd	Cary Grant, Martha Scott, Cedric Hardwicke	United States	traditional Western
King of the Lumberjacks	William Clemens	John Payne, Gloria Dickson, Stanley Fields	United States	B Western
King of the Royal Mounted	John English, William Witney	Allan "Rocky" Lane, Robert Strange, Robert Kellard	United States	Canadian mountie serial Western
Kit Carson	George B. Seitz	Jon Hall, Lynn Bari, Dana Andrews, Ward Bond	United States	traditional Western
Knights of the Range	Lesley Selander	Russell Hayden, Victor Jory, Jean Parker	United States	traditional Western
Law and Order	Ray Taylor	Johnny Mack Brown, Fuzzy Knight, Nell O'Day	United States	B Western
The Light of Western Stars	Lesley Selander	Victor Jory, Jo Ann Sayers, Russell Hayden	United States	traditional Western
Lightning Strikes West	Harry L. Fraser	Ken Maynard, Claire Rochelle	United States	serial Western
Lone Star Raiders	George Sherman	Robert Livingston, Bob Steele, Rufe Davis	United States	The Three Mesquiteers serial Western
Lucky Cisco Kid	H. Bruce Humberstone	Cesar Romero, Mary Beth Hughes, Dana Andrews	United States	The Cisco Kid serial Western
The Man from Tumbleweeds	Joseph H. Lewis	Wild Bill Elliott, Iris Meredith	United States	B Western
The Mark of Zorro	Rouben Mamoulian	Tyrone Power, Linda Darnell, Basil Rathbone, Gale Sondergaard	United States	Mexico Western
Melody Ranch	Joseph Santley	Gene Autry, Jimmy Durante, Ann Miller	United States	Singing cowboy Western
Men with Steel Faces	Otto Brower, B. Reeves Eason	Gene Autry, Frankie Darro, Betsy King Ross, Dorothy Christy	United States	science fiction Western—a feature-length re-edit of the 1935 serial 'The Phantom Empire'
Murder on the Yukon	Louis J. Gasnier	James Newill, Polly Ann Young, Dave O'Brien	United States	Northern Western
My Little Chickadee	Edward F. Cline	Mae West, W. C. Fields, Joseph Calleia	United States	comedy/musical Western
North West Mounted Police	Cecil B. DeMille	Gary Cooper, Paulette Goddard, Madeleine Carroll	United States	Northern Western
Northwest Passage	King Vidor	Spencer Tracy, Robert Young, Walter Brennan	United States	colonial American frontier
Oklahoma Renegades	Nate Watt	Robert Livingston, Raymond Hatton, Duncan Renaldo	United States	The Three Mesquiteers serial Western
Out West with the Peppers	Charles Barton	Edith Fellows, Charles Peck, Tommy Bond, Bobby Larson, Dorothy Anne Seese	United States	comedy Western
Phantom Rancher	Harry L. Fraser	Ken Maynard, Dorothy Short, Harry Harvey	United States	serial Western
Pioneers of the Frontier	Sam Nelson	Charles Starrett, Dorothy Comingore	United States	B Western
Pioneers of the West	Lester Orlebeck	Robert Livingston, Raymond Hatton, Duncan Renaldo	United States	The Three Mesquiteers serial Western
Pony Post	Ray Taylor	Johnny Mack Brown, Fuzzy Knight, Nell O'Day	United States	B Western
Prairie Schooners	Sam Nelson	Wild Bill Elliott, Evelyn Young, Dub Taylor	United States	B Western
Queen of the Yukon	Phil Rosen	Charles Bickford, Irene Rich, Melvin Lang, George Cleveland, June Carlson	United States	Alaska gold rush Western
Ragtime Cowboy Joe	Ray Taylor	Johnny Mack Brown, Fuzzy Knight, Nell O'Day	United States	B Western
Rancho Grande	Frank McDonald	Gene Autry, Smiley Burnette, June Storey, Mary Lee	United States	Singing cowboy Western
The Range Busters	S. Roy Luby	Ray "Crash" Corrigan, John "Dusty" King, Max Terhune	United States	first Range Busters serial Western
The Ranger and the Lady	Joseph Kane	Roy Rogers, George "Gabby" Hayes, Julie Bishop	United States	Singing cowboy Western
Rangers of Fortune	Sam Wood	Fred MacMurray, Albert Dekker, Gilbert Roland, Patricia Morison	United States	traditional Western
The Return of Frank James	Fritz Lang	Henry Fonda, Gene Tierney, Jackie Cooper, Henry Hull, John Carradine	United States	outlaw Western
The Return of Wild Bill	Joseph H. Lewis	Wild Bill Elliott, Iris Meredith	United States	B Western
Ride, Tenderfoot, Ride	Frank McDonald	Gene Autry, Smiley Burnette, June Storey	United States	Singing cowboy Western
Riders of Pasco Basin	Ray Taylor	Johnny Mack Brown, Bob Baker, Fuzzy Knight	United States	B Western
River's End	Ray Enright	Dennis Morgan, Elizabeth Inglis, George Tobias	United States	traditional Western
Rocky Mountain Rangers	George Sherman	Robert Livingston, Raymond Hatton, Duncan Renaldo	United States	The Three Mesquiteers serial Western
Santa Fe Marshal	Lesley Selander	William Boyd, Russell Hayden, Marjorie Rambeau	United States	Hopalong Cassidy serial Western
Santa Fe Trail	Michael Curtiz	Errol Flynn, Olivia de Havilland, Raymond Massey, Ronald Reagan, Van Heflin	United States	traditional Western
Shooting High	Alfred E. Green	Gene Autry, Jane Withers, Marjorie Weaver	United States	Singing cowboy Western
The Showdown	Howard Bretherton	William Boyd, Russell Hayden, Britt Wood	United States	Hopalong Cassidy serial Western
Son of Roaring Dan	Ford Beebe	Johnny Mack Brown, Fuzzy Knight, Nell O'Day	United States	B Western
Stagecoach War	Lesley Selander	William Boyd, Russell Hayden, Julie Carter	United States	Hopalong Cassidy serial Western
Take Me Back to Oklahoma	Albert Herman	Tex Ritter, Bob Wills, Slim Andrews	United States	Singing cowboy Western
The Texas Rangers Ride Again	James P. Hogan	Ellen Drew, John Howard, Akim Tamiroff	United States	Modern Western
Texas Stagecoach	Joseph H. Lewis	Charles Starrett, Iris Meredith, Bob Nolan	United States	B Western
Texas Terrors	George Sherman	Don "Red" Barry, Julie Duncan, Al St. John	United States	B Western
The Trail Blazers	George Sherman	Robert Livingston, Bob Steele, Rufe Davis	United States	The Three Mesquiteers serial Western
Three Men from Texas	Lesley Selander	William Boyd, Russell Hayden, Andy Clyde	United States	Hopalong Cassidy serial Western
Thundering Frontier	D. Ross Lederman	Charles Starrett, Iris Meredith, Ray Bennett	United States	B Western
Trailing Double Trouble	S. Roy Luby	Ray "Crash" Corrigan, John "Dusty" King, Max Terhune, Lita Conway	United States	Range Busters serial Western
Under Texas Skies	George Sherman	Robert Livingston, Bob Steele, Rufe Davis	United States	The Three Mesquiteers serial Western
Virginia City	Michael Curtiz	Errol Flynn, Miriam Hopkins, Randolph Scott, Humphrey Bogart, Frank McHugh, Alan Hale, Guinn "Big Boy" Williams, John Litel, Douglass Dumbrille, Moroni Olsen, Russell Hicks, Dickie Jones, Frank Wilcox, Russell Simpson, Victor Kilian, Charles Middleton	United States	traditional Western
Viva Cisco Kid	Norman Foster	Cesar Romero, Jean Rogers, Chris-Pin Martin	United States	The Cisco Kid serial Western
Wagon Train	Edward Killy	Tim Holt, Ray Whitley, Martha O'Driscoll	United States	B Western
Wagons Westward	Lew Landers	Chester Morris, Anita Louise, Buck Jones	United States	B Western
West of Abilene	Ralph Ceder	Charles Starrett, Bruce Bennett, Marjorie Cooley	United States	B Western
West of Carson City	Ray Taylor	Johnny Mack Brown, Bob Baker, Fuzzy Knight	United States	B Western
West of Pinto Basin	S. Roy Luby	Ray "Crash" Corrigan, John "Dusty" King, Max Terhune	United States	Range Busters serial Western
The Westerner	William Wyler	Gary Cooper, Walter Brennan, Doris Davenport	United States	traditional Western
When the Daltons Rode	George Marshall	Randolph Scott, Kay Francis, Brian Donlevy, George Bancroft, Broderick Crawford, Stuart Erwin, Andy Devine, Frank Albertson, Mary Gordon, Edgar Dearing, Dorothy Granger, Robert McKenzie, Fay McKenzie, Walter Soderling, Mary Ainslee, Erville Alderson, Sally Payne, Edgar Buchanan	United States	traditional Western
The Wildcat of Tucson	Lambert Hillyer	Wild Bill Elliott, Evelyn Young	United States	B Western
Winners of the West	Ford Beebe, Ray Taylor	Dick Foran, Anne Nagel, James Craig	United States	serial Western
Wyoming	Richard Thorpe	Wallace Beery, Leo Carrillo, Ann Rutherford	United States	traditional Western
Young Bill Hickok	Joseph Kane	Roy Rogers, George "Gabby" Hayes, Sally Payne	United States	Singing cowboy Western
Young Buffalo Bill	Joseph Kane	Roy Rogers, George "Gabby" Hayes, Pauline Moore	United States	Singing cowboy Western
1941
Across the Sierras	D. Ross Lederman	Wild Bill Elliott, Richard Fiske, Luana Walters	United States	B Western
Along the Rio Grande	Edward Killy	Tim Holt, Betty Jane Rhodes, Ray Whitley	United States	serial Western
Arizona Bound	Spencer Gordon Bennet	Buck Jones, Tim McCoy, Raymond Hatton	United States	serial Western - first of the "Rough Rider" series
Arizona Cyclone	Joseph H. Lewis	Johnny Mack Brown, Fuzzy Knight, Nell O'Day	United States	B Western
Arkansas Judge	Frank McDonald	Leon Weaver, Frank Weaver, June Weaver, Roy Rogers	United States	musical Western
Back in the Saddle	Lew Landers	Gene Autry, Smiley Burnette	United States	Singing cowboy Western
The Bad Man	Richard Thorpe	Wallace Beery, Lionel Barrymore, Laraine Day, Ronald Reagan	United States	traditional Western
Bad Man of Deadwood	Joseph Kane	Roy Rogers, George "Gabby" Hayes, Sally Payne	United States	Singing cowboy Western
Bad Men of Missouri	Ray Enright	Dennis Morgan, Jane Wyman, Wayne Morris, Arthur Kennedy	United States	traditional Western
Badlands of Dakota	Alfred E. Green	Robert Stack, Broderick Crawford, Ann Rutherford	United States	traditional Western
The Bandit Trail	Edward Killy	Tim Holt, Ray Whitley, Janet Waldo	United States	serial Western
Belle Starr	Irving Cummings	Randolph Scott, Gene Tierney, Dana Andrews, John Strudwick, Elizabeth Patterson, Chill Wills, Louise Beavers, Olin Howland, Paul Burns, Joseph Sawyer, Joseph Downing, Howard C. Hickman, Charles Trowbridge, James Flavin, Charles Middleton	United States	Civil War Western
Billy the Kid	David Miller	Robert Taylor, Brian Donlevy, Lon Chaney Jr.	United States	traditional Western
Billy the Kid's Fighting Pals	Sam Newfield	Bob Steele, Al St. John, Phyllis Adair	United States	Billy the Kid serial Western
Billy the Kid in Santa Fe	Sam Newfield	Bob Steele, Al St. John, Dave O'Brien	United States	Billy the Kid serial Western
Billy the Kid's Range War	Sam Newfield	Bob Steele, Al St. John, Joan Barclay	United States	Billy the Kid serial Western
Billy the Kid's Round-Up	Sam Newfield	Buster Crabbe, Al St. John, Joan Barclay	United States	Billy the Kid serial Western
Billy the Kid Wanted	Sam Newfield	Buster Crabbe, Al St. John, Dave O'Brien	United States	Billy the Kid serial Western
Border Vigilantes	Derwin Abrahams	William Boyd, Russell Hayden, Andy Clyde	United States	Hopalong Cassidy serial Western
Bury Me Not on the Lone Prairie	Ray Taylor	Johnny Mack Brown, Fuzzy Knight, Nell O'Day	United States	B Western
The Cowboy and the Blonde	Ray McCarey	Mary Beth Hughes, George Montgomery	United States	comedy Western
Cyclone on Horseback	Edward Killy	Tim Holt, Marjorie Reynolds, Ray Whitley	United States	serial Western
Doomed Caravan	Lesley Selander	William Boyd, Andy Clyde, Russell Hayden	United States	Hopalong Cassidy serial Western
Down Mexico Way	Joseph Santley	Gene Autry, Smiley Burnette	United States	Singing cowboy Western
Dude Cowboy	David Howard	Tim Holt, Marjorie Reynolds, Eddie Kane	United States	serial Western
Fighting Bill Fargo	Ray Taylor	Johnny Mack Brown, Fuzzy Knight, Jean Brooks	United States	B Western
Forbidden Trails	Robert N. Bradbury	Buck Jones, Tim McCoy, Raymond Hatton	United States	Rough Riders serial Western
Fugitive Valley	S. Roy Luby	Ray "Crash" Corrigan, John "Dusty" King, Max Terhune	United States	Range Busters serial Western
Gangs of Sonora	John English	Robert Livingston, Bob Steele, Rufe Davis	United States	The Three Mesquiteers serial Western
Go West, Young Lady	Frank R. Strayer	Glenn Ford, Penny Singleton, Ann Miller, Charles Ruggles	United States	comedy Western
Gauchos of El Dorado	Lester Orlebeck	Tom Tyler, Bob Steele, Rufe Davis	United States	The Three Mesquiteers serial Western
The Gunman from Bodie	Spencer Gordon Bennet	Buck Jones, Tim McCoy, Raymond Hatton	United States	Rough Riders serial Western
Hands Across the Rockies	Lambert Hillyer	Wild Bill Elliott, Mary Daily	United States	B Western
Honky Tonk	Jack Conway	Clark Gable, Lana Turner, Claire Trevor	United States	traditional Western
Hudson's Bay	Irving Pichel	Paul Muni, Gene Tierney	United States	traditional Western
In Old Cheyenne	Joseph Kane	Roy Rogers, George "Gabby" Hayes, Joan Woodbury	United States	Singing cowboy Western
In Old Colorado	Howard Bretherton	William Boyd, Andy Clyde	United States	Hopalong Cassidy serial Western
Jesse James at Bay	Joseph Kane	Roy Rogers, George "Gabby" Hayes, Sally Payne	United States	Singing cowboy Western
The Kid's Last Ride	S. Roy Luby	Ray "Crash" Corrigan, John "Dusty" King, Max Terhune, Luana Walters	United States	Range Busters serial Western
King of Dodge City	Lambert Hillyer	Wild Bill Elliott, Tex Ritter	United States	B Western
King of the Texas Rangers	William Witney, John English	Sammy Baugh, Neil Hamilton, Duncan Renaldo, Pauline Moore	United States	serial modern Western
The Lady from Cheyenne	Frank Lloyd	Loretta Young, Robert Preston, Edward Arnold, Frank Craven, Gladys George	United States	comedy Western
Lady from Louisiana	Bernard Vorhaus	John Wayne, Ona Munson	United States	traditional Western
Last of the Duanes	James Tinling	George Montgomery, Lynne Roberts, Eve Arden, Francis Ford	United States	B Western
Law of the Range	Ray Taylor	Johnny Mack Brown, Fuzzy Knight, Nell O'Day	United States	B Western
The Lone Rider Ambushed	Sam Newfield	George F. Houston, Al St. John, Maxine Leslie	United States	Lone Rider serial Western
The Lone Rider Crosses the Rio	Sam Newfield	George F. Houston, Al St. John, Roquell Verria	United States	Lone Rider serial Western
The Lone Rider Fights Back	Sam Newfield	George F. Houston, Al St. John, Dennis Moore	United States	Lone Rider serial Western
The Lone Rider in Frontier Fury	Sam Newfield	George F. Houston, Al St. John, Hillary Brooke	United States	Lone Rider serial Western
The Lone Rider in Ghost Town	Sam Newfield	George F. Houston, Al St. John, Rebel Randall	United States	Lone Rider serial Western
The Lone Rider Rides On	Sam Newfield	George F. Houston, Al St. John, Hillary Brooke	United States	Lone Rider serial Western
Man from Montana	Ray Taylor	Johnny Mack Brown, Fuzzy Knight, Billy Lenhart	United States	B Western
The Masked Rider	Ford Beebe	Johnny Mack Brown, Fuzzy Knight, Nell O'Day	United States	B Western
The Medico of Painted Springs	Lambert Hillyer	Charles Starrett, Terry Walker, Ben Taggart	United States	B Western
Nevada City	Joseph Kane	Roy Rogers, George "Gabby" Hayes	United States	Singing cowboy Western
North from the Lone Star	Lambert Hillyer	Wild Bill Elliott, Richard Fiske	United States	B Western
Outlaws of Cherokee Trail	Lester Orlebeck	Tom Tyler, Bob Steele, Rufe Davis	United States	The Three Mesquiteers serial Western
Outlaws of the Desert	Howard Bretherton	William Boyd, Andy Clyde, Duncan Renaldo	United States	Hopalong Cassidy serial Western
Outlaws of the Panhandle	Sam Nelson	Charles Starrett, Frances Robinson, Stanley Brown	United States	B Western
The Parson of Panamint	William C. McGann	Charlie Ruggles, Ellen Drew, Phillip Terry	United States	traditional Western
The Pioneers	Albert Herman	Tex Ritter, Slim Andrews, Red Foley	United States	Singing cowboy Western
Pals of the Pecos	Lester Orlebeck	Robert Livingston, Bob Steele, Rufe Davis	United States	The Three Mesquiteers serial Western
The Pinto Kid	Lambert Hillyer	Charles Starrett, Louise Currie, Bob Nolan	United States	B Western
Pirates on Horseback	Lesley Selander	William Boyd, Russell Hayden, Andy Clyde	United States	Hopalong Cassidy serial Western
Prairie Pioneers	Lester Orlebeck	Robert Livingston, Bob Steele, Rufe Davis	United States	The Three Mesquiteers serial Western
Prairie Stranger	Lambert Hillyer	Charles Starrett, Cliff Edwards, Patti McCarty	United States	B Western
Rawhide Rangers	Ray Taylor	Johnny Mack Brown, Fuzzy Knight, Kathryn Adams	United States	B Western
Red River Valley	Joseph Kane	Roy Rogers, George "Gabby" Hayes, Sally Payne	United States	Singing cowboy Western
The Return of Daniel Boone	Lambert Hillyer	Wild Bill Elliott, Betty Miles, Dub Taylor	United States	B Western
Ride on Vaquero	Herbert I. Leeds	Cesar Romero, Chris-Pin Martin, Lynne Roberts	United States	The Cisco Kid serial Western
Riders of the Badlands	Howard Bretherton	Charles Starrett, Russell Hayden, Cliff Edwards	United States	B Western
Riders of Death Valley	Ford Beebe, Ray Taylor	Dick Foran, Leo Carrillo, Buck Jones, Charles Bickford, Guinn "Big Boy" Williams, Lon Chaney Jr., Noah Beery Jr.	United States	serial Western
Riders of the Purple Sage	James Tinling	George Montgomery, Mary Howard, Robert Barrat	United States	B Western
Riders of the Timberline	Lesley Selander	William Boyd, Andy Clyde, Victor Jory	United States	Hopalong Cassidy serial Western
Ridin' on a Rainbow	Lew Landers	Gene Autry, Smiley Burnette, Mary Lee	United States	Singing cowboy Western
Ridin' the Cherokee Trail	Spencer Gordon Bennet	Tex Ritter, Slim Andrews, Betty Miles	United States	Singing cowboy Western
Roaring Frontiers	Lambert Hillyer	Wild Bill Elliott, Tex Ritter	United States	B Western
Robbers of the Range	Edward Killy	Tim Holt, Virginia Vale, Ray Whitley	United States	serial Western
Robin Hood of the Pecos	Joseph Kane	Roy Rogers, George "Gabby" Hayes, Marjorie Reynolds	United States	Singing cowboy Western
Romance of the Rio Grande	Herbert I. Leeds	Cesar Romero, Chris-Pin Martin, Lynne Roberts	United States	The Cisco Kid serial Western
The Royal Mounted Patrol	Lambert Hillyer	Charles Starrett, Russell Hayden, Wanda McKay	United States	B Western
Saddle Mountain Roundup	S. Roy Luby	Ray "Crash" Corrigan, John "Dusty" King, Max Terhune	United States	Range Busters serial Western
Saddlemates	Lester Orlebeck	Robert Livingston, Bob Steele, Rufe Davis	United States	The Three Mesquiteers serial Western
Secret of the Wasteland	Derwin Abrahams	William Boyd, Andy Clyde, Barbara Britton	United States	Hopalong Cassidy serial Western
The Shepherd of the Hills	Henry Hathaway	John Wayne, Betty Field	United States	traditional Western
Sheriff of Tombstone	Joseph Kane	Roy Rogers, George "Gabby" Hayes, Elyse Knox	United States	Singing cowboy Western
Sierra Sue	William Morgan	Gene Autry, Smiley Burnette, Fay McKenzie	United States	Singing cowboy Western
The Singing Hill	Lew Landers	Gene Autry, Smiley Burnette, Mary Lee	United States	Singing cowboy Western
Six-Gun Gold	David Howard	Tim Holt, Ray Whitley, Jan Clayton	United States	serial Western
The Son of Davy Crockett	Lambert Hillyer	Wild Bill Elliott, Iris Meredith	United States	B Western
Stick to Your Guns	Lesley Selander	William Boyd, Andy Clyde, Brad King	United States	Hopalong Cassidy serial Western
Sunset in Wyoming	William Morgan	Gene Autry, Smiley Burnette, Maris Wrixon	United States	Singing cowboy Western
Texas	George Marshall	William Holden, Glenn Ford, Claire Trevor	United States	traditional Western
They Died with Their Boots On	Raoul Walsh	Errol Flynn, Olivia de Havilland, Arthur Kennedy, Gene Lockhart, Anthony Quinn, Sydney Greenstreet	United States	traditional Western
Thunder Over the Prairie	Lambert Hillyer	Charles Starrett, Cliff Edwards, Eileen O'Hearn	United States	B Western
Tonto Basin Outlaws	S. Roy Luby	Ray "Crash" Corrigan, John "Dusty" King, Max Terhune	United States	Range Busters serial Western
The Trail of Silver Spurs	S. Roy Luby	Ray "Crash" Corrigan, John "Dusty" King, Max Terhune	United States	Range Busters serial Western
Tumbledown Ranch in Arizona	S. Roy Luby	Ray "Crash" Corrigan, John "Dusty" King, Max Terhune	United States	Range Busters serial Western
Twilight on the Trail	Howard Bretherton	William Boyd, Andy Clyde, Wanda McKay	United States	Hopalong Cassidy serial Western
Under Fiesta Stars	Frank McDonald	Gene Autry, Smiley Burnette, Carol Hughes	United States	Singing cowboy Western
Underground Rustlers	S. Roy Luby	Ray "Crash" Corrigan, John "Dusty" King, Max Terhune	United States	Range Busters serial Western
West of Cimarron	Lester Orlebeck	Bob Steele, Tom Tyler, Rufe Davis	United States	The Three Mesquiteers serial Western
Western Union	Fritz Lang	Robert Young, Randolph Scott, Dean Jagger, Virginia Gilmore, John Carradine, Barton MacLane, Russell Hicks, Slim Summerville, Chill Wills, Victor Kilian, Minor Watson, George Chandler, Chief John Big Tree, Chief Thundercloud, Addison Richards, Irving Bacon, Hank Bell, Tom London, Charles Middleton	United States	traditional Western
White Eagle	James W. Horne	Buck Jones, Raymond Hatton, Dorothy Fay	United States	serial Western
Wide Open Town	Lesley Selander	William Boyd, Andy Clyde, Russell Hayden	United States	Hopalong Cassidy serial Western
Wrangler's Roost	S. Roy Luby	Ray "Crash" Corrigan, John "Dusty" King, Max Terhune	United States	Range Busters serial Western
Wyoming Wildcat	George Sherman	Don Barry, Julie Duncan	United States	Red Ryder serial Western
1942
American Empire	William C. McGann	Richard Dix, Leo Carrillo	United States	B Western
Arizona Roundup	Robert Emmett Tansey	Tom Keene, Sugar Dawn	United States	B Western
Arizona Stage Coach	S. Roy Luby	Ray "Crash" Corrigan, John "Dusty" King, Max Terhune	United States	Range Busters serial Western
Bad Men of the Hills	William Berke	Charles Starrett, Russell Hayden, Cliff Edwards	United States	B Western
Bandit Ranger	Lesley Selander	Tim Holt, Joan Barclay, Cliff Edwards	United States	serial Western
Bells of Capistrano	William Morgan	Gene Autry, Smiley Burnette	United States	Singing cowboy Western
Below the Border	Howard Bretherton	Buck Jones, Tim McCoy, Raymond Hatton	United States	Rough Riders serial Western
Billy the Kid's Smoking Guns	Sam Newfield	Buster Crabbe, Al St. John, Dave O'Brien	United States	Billy the Kid serial Western
Billy the Kid Trapped	Sam Newfield	Buster Crabbe, Al St. John, Anne Jeffreys	United States	Billy the Kid serial Western
Boot Hill Bandits	S. Roy Luby	Ray "Crash" Corrigan, John "Dusty" King, Max Terhune	United States	Range Busters serial Western
Border Roundup	Sam Newfield	George F. Houston, Al St. John, Dennis Moore	United States	Lone Rider serial Western
Boss of Hangtown Mesa	Joseph H. Lewis	Johnny Mack Brown, Fuzzy Knight, William Farnum	United States	B Western
Bullets for Bandits	Wallace Fox	Wild Bill Elliott, Tex Ritter	United States	B Western
Call of the Canyon	Joseph Santley	Gene Autry, Smiley Burnette	United States	Singing cowboy Western
Code of the Outlaw	John English	Tom Tyler, Bob Steele, Rufe Davis	United States	The Three Mesquiteers serial Western
Come on Danger	Edward Killy	Tim Holt, Ray Whitley, Frances E. Neal	United States	serial Western
Cowboy Serenade	William Morgan	Gene Autry, Smiley Burnette	United States	Singing cowboy Western
Dawn on the Great Divide	Howard Bretherton	Buck Jones, Raymond Hatton, Mona Barrie, Rex Bell	United States	Rough Riders serial Western
Deep in the Heart of Texas	Elmer Clifton	Johnny Mack Brown, Tex Ritter, Fuzzy Knight, Jennifer Holt	United States	B Western
Down Rio Grande Way	William Berke	Charles Starrett, Russell Hayden, Britt Wood	United States	B Western
Down Texas Way	Howard Bretherton	Buck Jones, Tim McCoy, Raymond Hatton, Luana Walters	United States	Rough Riders serial Western
The Devil's Trail	Lambert Hillyer	Wild Bill Elliott, Tex Ritter	United States	B Western
Ghost Town Law	Howard Bretherton	Buck Jones, Tim McCoy, Raymond Hatton, Virginia Carpenter	United States	Rough Riders serial Western
The Great Man's Lady	William A. Wellman	Barbara Stanwyck, Joel McCrea, Brian Donlevy	United States	traditional Western
Heart of the Golden West	Joseph Kane	Roy Rogers, Smiley Burnette, George "Gabby" Hayes	United States	Singing cowboy Western
Heart of the Rio Grande	William Morgan	Gene Autry, Smiley Burnette	United States	Singing cowboy Western
Home in Wyomin'	William Morgan	Gene Autry, Smiley Burnette	United States	Singing cowboy Western
In Old California	William C. McGann	John Wayne, Binnie Barnes, Albert Dekker	United States	gold rush Western
Jackass Mail	Norman Z. McLeod	Wallace Beery, Marjorie Main, J. Carrol Naish	United States	comedy Western
King of the Mounties	William Witney	Allan "Rocky" Lane, Gilbert Emery, Russell Hicks	United States	Canadian mountie serial Western
Land of the Open Range	Edward Killy	Tim Holt, Ray Whitley, Janet Waldo	United States	serial Western
Law and Order	Sam Newfield	Buster Crabbe, Al St. John, Dave O'Brien	United States	Billy the Kid serial Western
Lawless Plainsmen	William Berke	Charles Starrett, Russell Hayden, Luana Walters	United States	B Western
Little Joe, the Wrangler	Lewis D. Collins	Johnny Mack Brown, Tex Ritter, Fuzzy Knight, Jennifer Holt	United States	B Western
The Lone Prairie	William Berke	Russell Hayden, Dub Taylor, Bob Wills	United States	B Western
The Lone Rider and the Bandit	Sam Newfield	George F. Houston, Al St. John, Dennis Moore	United States	Lone Rider serial Western
The Lone Rider in Cheyenne	Sam Newfield	George F. Houston, Al St. John, Dennis Moore	United States	Lone Rider serial Western
The Lone Rider in Texas Justice	Sam Newfield	George F. Houston, Al St. John, Dennis Moore	United States	Lone Rider serial Western
Lone Star Ranger	James Tinling	John Kimbrough, Sheila Ryan	United States	B Western
The Lone Star Vigilantes	Wallace Fox	Wild Bill Elliott, Tex Ritter	United States	B Western
Lost Canyon	Lesley Selander	William Boyd, Andy Clyde, Jay Kirby	United States	Hopalong Cassidy serial Western
Man from Cheyenne	Joseph Kane	Roy Rogers, George "Gabby" Hayes, Sally Payne	United States	Singing cowboy Western
Men of Texas	Ray Enright	Robert Stack, Broderick Crawford, Jackie Cooper	United States	traditional Western
The Mysterious Rider	Sam Newfield	Buster Crabbe, Al St. John, Kermit Maynard	United States	Billy the Kid serial Western
North of the Rockies	Lambert Hillyer	Wild Bill Elliot, Tex Ritter	United States	B Western
Northwest Rangers	Joseph M. Newman	James Craig, William Lundigan, Patricia Dane	United States	Northern Western
The Old Chisholm Trail	Elmer Clifton	Johnny Mack Brown, Tex Ritter, Fuzzy Knight, Jennifer Holt	United States	B Western
Outlaws of Boulder Pass	Sam Newfield	George F. Houston, Al St. John, Dennis Moore	United States	Lone Rider serial Western
Overland Mail	Ford Beebe	Lon Chaney Jr., Noah Beery Sr., Noah Beery Jr.	United States	serial Western
Overland Stagecoach	Sam Newfield	Robert Livingston, Al St. John, Dennis Moore	United States	Lone Rider serial Western
Overland to Deadwood	William Berke	Charles Starrett, Russell Hayden, Cliff Edwards	United States	B Western
Pardon My Gun	William Berke	Charles Starrett, Alma Carroll, Arthur Hunnicutt	United States	B Western
Perils of the Royal Mounted	James W. Horne	Robert Kellard, Nell O'Day, Kenneth MacDonald	United States	Canadian Mountie serial Western
The Phantom Plainsmen	John English	Tom Tyler, Bob Steele, Rufe Davis	United States	The Three Mesquiteers serial Western
Prairie Gunsmoke	Lambert Hillyer	Wild Bill Elliott, Tex Ritter	United States	B Western
Pirates of the Prairie	Howard Bretherton	Tim Holt, Cliff Edwards, Nell O'Day	United States	serial Western
Raiders of the Range	John English	Tom Tyler, Bob Steele, Rufe Davis	United States	The Three Mesquiteers serial Western
The Rangers Take Over	Albert Herman	Dave O'Brien, James Newill, Guy Wilkerson	United States	Texas Rangers serial Western
Red River Robin Hood	Lesley Selander	Tim Holt, Cliff Edwards, Barbara Moffett	United States	serial Western
Ride 'Em Cowboy	Arthur Lubin	Bud Abbott, Lou Costello, Johnny Mack Brown, Dick Foran	United States	comedy Western
Riders of the Northland	William Berke	Charles Starrett, Russell Hayden, Shirley Patterson	United States	B Western
Riders of the West	Howard Bretherton	Buck Jones, Tim McCoy, Raymond Hatton	United States	Rough Riders serial Western
Ridin' Down the Canyon	Joseph Kane	Roy Rogers, George "Gabby" Hayes, The Sons of the Pioneers	United States	Singing cowboy Western
Riding the Wind	Edward Killy	Tim Holt, Ray Whitley, Joan Barclay	United States	serial Western
Riding Through Nevada	William Berke	Charles Starrett, Shirley Patterson, Arthur Hunnicutt	United States	B Western
Rock River Renegades	S. Roy Luby	Ray "Crash" Corrigan, John "Dusty" King, Max Terhune	United States	Range Busters serial Western
Romance on the Range	Joseph Kane	Roy Rogers, George "Gabby" Hayes, Sally Payne	United States	Singing cowboy Western
Shadows on the Sage	Lester Orlebeck	Tom Tyler, Bob Steele, Jimmie Dodd	United States	The Three Mesquiteers serial Western
Sheriff of Sage Valley	Sam Newfield	Buster Crabbe, Al St. John, Dave O'Brien	United States	Billy the Kid serial Western
Shut My Big Mouth	Charles Barton	Joe E. Brown, Adele Mara, Victor Jory	United States	comedy Western
The Silver Bullet	Joseph H. Lewis	Johnny Mack Brown, Fuzzy Knight, William Farnum, Jennifer Holt	United States	B Western
Silver Queen	Lloyd Bacon	George Brent, Priscilla Lane, Bruce Cabot	United States	traditional Western
Sin Town	Ray Enright	Constance Bennett, Broderick Crawford, Patric Knowles	United States	traditional Western
Sons of the Pioneers	Joseph Kane	Roy Rogers, George "Gabby" Hayes, Bob Nolan	United States	Singing cowboy Western
South of Santa Fe	Joseph Kane	Roy Rogers, George "Gabby" Hayes, Paul Fix	United States	Singing cowboy Western
The Spoilers	Ray Enright	Marlene Dietrich, Randolph Scott, John Wayne, Margaret Lindsay, Harry Carey, Richard Barthelmess, George Cleveland, Samuel S. Hinds, Russell Simpson, William Farnum, Marietta Canty, Jack Norton, Forrest Taylor, Charles Halton, Bud Osborne	United States	Alaska gold rush Western
Stagecoach Buckaroo	Ray Taylor	Johnny Mack Brown, Fuzzy Knight, Nell O'Day	United States	B Western
Stardust on the Sage	William Morgan	Gene Autry, Smiley Burnette	United States	Singing cowboy Western
Sundown Jim	James Tinling	John Kimbrough, Virginia Gilmore, Arleen Whelan, Joe Sawyer	United States	B Western
Sunset on the Desert	Joseph Kane	Roy Rogers, George "Gabby" Hayes, Lynne Carver	United States	Singing cowboy Western
Sunset Serenade	Joseph Kane	Roy Rogers, George "Gabby" Hayes, Helen Parrish	United States	Singing cowboy Western
Ten Gentlemen from West Point	Henry Hathaway	George Montgomery, Maureen O'Hara, John Sutton	United States	traditional Western
Texas to Bataan	Arthur Hoerl	John "Dusty" King, David Sharpe, Max Terhune	United States	Range Busters serial Western
Texas Trouble Shooters	S. Roy Luby	Ray "Crash" Corrigan, John "Dusty" King, Max Terhune	United States	Range Busters serial Western
Thunder River Feud	S. Roy Luby	Ray "Crash" Corrigan, John "Dusty" King, Max Terhune	United States	Range Busters serial Western
Thundering Hoofs	Lesley Selander	Tim Holt, Ray Whitley, Luana Walters	United States	serial Western
Tombstone, the Town Too Tough to Die	William C. McGann	Richard Dix, Edgar Buchanan, Frances Gifford	United States	gunfighter Western
A Tornado in the Saddle	William Berke	Russell Hayden, Dub Taylor, Alma Carroll	United States	B Western
Trail Riders	Robert Emmett Tansey	John "Dusty" King, David Sharpe, Max Terhune	United States	Range Busters serial Western
Undercover Man	Lesley Selander	William Boyd, Andy Clyde, Jay Kirby	United States	Hopalong Cassidy serial Western
Valley of Hunted Men	John English	Tom Tyler, Bob Steele, Jimmie Dodd	United States	The Three Mesquiteers serial Western
Valley of the Sun	George Marshall	Lucille Ball, James Craig, Cedric Hardwicke, Dean Jagger	United States	comedy Western
The Valley of Vanishing Men	Spencer Gordon Bennet	Wild Bill Elliott, Slim Summerville, Kenneth MacDonald	United States	serial Western
Vengeance of the West	Lambert Hillyer	Wild Bill Elliott, Tex Ritter	United States	B Western
West of the Law	Howard Bretherton	Buck Jones, Tim McCoy, Raymond Hatton	United States	Rough Riders serial Western
West of Tombstone	Howard Bretherton	Charles Starrett, Russell Hayden, Cliff Edwards	United States	serial Western
Western Mail	Robert Emmett Tansey	Tom Keene, Frank Yaconelli, LeRoy Mason	United States	B Western
Westward Ho	John English	Tom Tyler, Bob Steele, Rufe Davis	United States	The Three Mesquiteers serial Western
Wild Bill Hickok Rides	Ray Enright	Constance Bennett, Bruce Cabot, Warren William	United States	traditional Western
1943
The Avenging Rider	Sam Nelson	Tim Holt, Cliff Edwards, Ann Summers	United States	serial Western
Bad Men of Thunder Gap	Albert Herman	Dave O'Brien, James Newill, Guy Wilkerson	United States	Texas Rangers serial Western
Bar 20	Lesley Selander	William Boyd, Andy Clyde, George Reeves	United States	Hopalong Cassidy serial Western
Beyond the Last Frontier	Howard Bretherton	Eddie Dew, Smiley Burnette, Robert Mitchum	United States	traditional Western
Black Market Rustlers	S. Roy Luby	Ray "Crash" Corrigan, Dennis Moore, Max Terhune	United States	Range Busters serial Western
Blazing Frontier	Sam Newfield	Buster Crabbe, Al St. John, Marjorie Manners	United States	Billy the Kid serial Western
Blazing Guns	Robert Emmett Tansey	Ken Maynard, Hoot Gibson, LeRoy Mason	United States	Trail Blazers serial Western
The Blocked Trail	Elmer Clifton	Bob Steele, Tom Tyler, Jimmie Dodd	United States	The Three Mesquiteers serial Western
Border Buckaroos	Oliver Drake	Dave O'Brien, James Newill, Guy Wilkerson	United States	Texas Rangers serial Western
Border Patrol	Lesley Selander	William Boyd, Andy Clyde	United States	Hopalong Cassidy serial Western
Boss of Rawhide	Elmer Clifton	Dave O'Brien, James Newill, Guy Wilkerson	United States	Texas Rangers serial Western
Buckskin Frontier	Lesley Selander	Richard Dix, Jane Wyatt, Lee J. Cobb	United States	traditional Western
Bullets and Saddles	Anthony Marshall	Ray "Crash" Corrigan, Dennis Moore, Max Terhune	United States	Range Busters serial Western
Cattle Stampede	Sam Newfield	Buster Crabbe, Al St. John, Frances Gladwin	United States	Billy the Kid serial Western
Cheyenne Roundup	Ray Taylor	Johnny Mack Brown, Tex Ritter, Fuzzy Knight, Jennifer Holt	United States	B Western
Colt Comrades	Lesley Selander	William Boyd, Andy Clyde, George Reeves	United States	Hopalong Cassidy serial Western
Cowboy Commandos	S. Roy Luby	Ray "Crash" Corrigan, Dennis Moore, Max Terhune	United States	Range Busters serial Western
Cowboy in the Clouds	Benjamin H. Kline	Charles Starrett, Dub Taylor, Julie Duncan	United States	B Western
Daredevils of the West	John English	Allan "Rocky" Lane, Kay Aldridge, Eddie Acuff	United States	serial Western
Death Rides the Plains	Sam Newfield	Robert Livingston, Al St. John, Patti McCarty	United States	The Lone Rider serial Western; B Western
Death Valley Rangers	Robert Emmett Tansey	Ken Maynard, Hoot Gibson, Bob Steele	United States	Trail Blazers serial Western
The Desperadoes	Charles Vidor	Randolph Scott, Claire Trevor, Glenn Ford, Evelyn Keyes, Edgar Buchanan, Guinn 'Big Boy' Williams, Raymond Walburn, Porter Hall, Bernard Nedell, Joan Woodbury, Irving Bacon, Glenn Strange	United States	traditional Western
Devil Riders	Sam Newfield	Buster Crabbe, Al St. John, Patti McCarty	United States	Billy the Kid serial Western
False Colors	George Archainbaud	William Boyd, Andy Clyde	United States	Hopalong Cassidy serial Western
The Fighting Buckaroo	William Berke	Charles Starrett, Kay Harris, Arthur Hunnicutt	United States	B Western
Fighting Frontier	Lambert Hillyer	Tim Holt, Cliff Edwards, Ann Summers	United States	serial Western
Fighting Valley	Oliver Drake	Dave O'Brien, James Newill, Guy Wilkerson	United States	Texas Rangers serial Western
Frontier Fury	William Berke	Charles Starrett, Roma Aldrich, Arthur Hunnicutt	United States	B Western
Frontier Law	William Berke	Russell Hayden, Fuzzy Knight, Dennis Moore	United States	B Western
Fugitive of the Plains	Sam Newfield	Buster Crabbe, Al St. John, Maxine Leslie	United States	Billy the Kid serial Western
Girl Crazy	Norman Taurog	Mickey Rooney, Judy Garland	United States	Musical western
The Ghost Rider	Wallace Fox	Johnny Mack Brown, Raymond Hatton, Harry Woods	United States	B Western
Hail to the Rangers	William Berke	Charles Starrett, Arthur Hunnicutt, Robert Owen Atcher	United States	B Western
Haunted Ranch	Robert Emmett Tansey	John "Dusty" King, David Sharpe, Max Terhune	United States	Range Busters serial Western
Hoppy Serves a Writ	George Archainbaud	William Boyd, Andy Clyde, Robert Mitchum	United States	Hopalong Cassidy serial Western
Idaho	Joseph Kane	Roy Rogers, Smiley Burnette, Virginia Grey	United States	Singing cowboy Western
In Old Oklahoma, aka: War of the Wildcats	Albert S. Rogell	John Wayne, George "Gabby" Hayes, Dale Evans, Albert Dekker, Martha Scott	United States	land rush Western
The Kansan	George Archainbaud	Richard Dix, Jane Wyatt, Albert Dekker	United States	town tamer Western
The Kid Rides Again	Sam Newfield	Buster Crabbe, Al St. John, Iris Meredith	United States	Billy the Kid serial Western
King of the Cowboys	Joseph Kane	Roy Rogers, Smiley Burnette	United States	Singing cowboy Western
Klondike Kate	William Castle	Ann Savage, Tom Neal	United States	B Western
A Lady Takes a Chance	William A. Seiter	John Wayne, Jean Arthur	United States	contemporary Western
Land of Hunted Men	S. Roy Luby	Ray "Crash" Corrigan, Dennis Moore, Max Terhune, Phyllis Adair	United States	Range Busters serial Western
Law of the Northwest	William Berke	Charles Starrett, Shirley Patterson, Arthur Hunnicutt	United States	B Western
Law of the Saddle	Melville De Lay	Robert Livingston, Al St. John, Betty Miles	United States	Lone Rider serial Western
The Law Rides Again	Alan James	Ken Maynard, Hoot Gibson, Jack La Rue, Betty Miles	United States	Trail Blazers serial Western
Leather Burners	Joseph Henabery	William Boyd, Andy Clyde	United States	Hopalong Cassidy serial Western
The Lone Star Trail	Ray Taylor	Johnny Mack Brown, Tex Ritter, Fuzzy Knight, Jennifer Holt	United States	B Western
The Man from Music Mountain, aka, Texas Legionnaires	Joseph Kane	Roy Rogers, Sons of the Pioneers	United States	Singing cowboy Western
My Friend Flicka	Harold D. Schuster	Roddy McDowall, Preston Foster, Rita Johnson	United States	family Western
The Outlaw	Howard Hughes	Jack Buetel, Jane Russell, Thomas Mitchell, Walter Huston	United States	adult Western
Outlaws of Stampede Pass	Wallace Fox	Johnny Mack Brown, Raymond Hatton, Ellen Hall	United States	B Western
The Ox-Bow Incident	William A. Wellman	Henry Fonda, Dana Andrews	United States	psychological Western
Raiders of Red Gap	Sam Newfield	Robert Livingston, Al St. John, Myrna Dell	United States	Lone Rider serial Western
Raiders of San Joaquin	Lewis D. Collins	Johnny Mack Brown, Tex Ritter, Fuzzy Knight, Jennifer Holt	United States	B Western
Raiders of Sunset Pass	John English	Eddie Dew, Smiley Burnette, Jennifer Holt	United States	B Western
The Renegade	Sam Newfield	Buster Crabbe, Al St. John, Lois Ranson	United States	Billy the Kid serial Western
Return of the Rangers	Elmer Clifton	Dave O'Brien. James Newill, Guy Wilkerson	United States	Texas Rangers serial Western
Riders of the Deadline	Lesley Selander	William Boyd, Andy Clyde, Jimmy Rogers	United States	Hopalong Cassidy serial Western
Riders of the Northwest Mounted	William Berke	Russell Hayden, Dub Taylor, Bob Wills	United States	B Western
Riders of the Rio Grande	Howard Bretherton	Tom Tyler, Bob Steele, Jimmie Dodd	United States	The Three Mesquiteers serial Western
Robin Hood of the Range	William Berke	Charles Starrett, Arthur Hunnicutt, Kay Harris	United States	B Western
Saddles and Sagebrush	William Berke	Russell Hayden, Dub Taylor, Ann Savage	United States	B Western
Sagebrush Law	Sam Nelson	Tim Holt, Cliff Edwards, Joan Barclay	United States	B Western
Santa Fe Scouts	Howard Bretherton	Tom Tyler, Bob Steele, Jimmie Dodd	United States	The Three Mesquiteers serial Western
Silver City Raiders	William Berke	Russell Hayden, Dub Taylor, Bob Wills	United States	B Western
Silver Spurs	Joseph Kane	Roy Rogers, Smiley Burnette, John Carradine	United States	Singing cowboy Western
Six Gun Gospel	Lambert Hillyer	Johnny Mack Brown, Raymond Hatton, Eddie Dew	United States	B Western
Song of Texas	Joseph Kane	Roy Rogers, Sheila Ryan, Barton MacLane	United States	Singing cowboy Western
The Stranger from Pecos	Lambert Hillyer	Johnny Mack Brown, Raymond Hatton, Kirby Grant, Christine McIntyre	United States	B Western
Tenting Tonight on the Old Campground	Lewis D. Collins	Johnny Mack Brown, Tex Ritter, Fuzzy Knight, Jennifer Holt	United States	B Western
The Texas Kid	Lambert Hillyer	Johnny Mack Brown, Raymond Hatton, Shirley Patterson	United States	B Western
Thundering Trails	John English	Tom Tyler, Bob Steele, Jimmie Dodd	United States	The Three Mesquiteers serial Western
Trail of Terror	Oliver Drake	Dave O'Brien, James Newill, Guy Wilkerson	United States	Texas Rangers serial Western
Two Fisted Justice	Robert Emmett Tansey	John "Dusty" King, David Sharpe, Max Terhune	United States	Range Busters serial Western
The Vigalantes Ride	William Berke	Russell Hayden, Dub Taylor, Bob Wills	United States	B Western
West of Texas	Oliver Drake	Dave O'Brien, James Newill, Guy Wilkerson	United States	Texas Rangers serial Western
Western Cyclone	Sam Newfield	Buster Crabbe, Al St. John, Marjorie Manners	United States	Billy the Kid serial Western
Wild Horse Rustlers	Sam Newfield	Robert Livingston, Al St. John, Lane Chandler	United States	Lone Rider serial Western
Wild Horse Stampede	Alan James	Ken Maynard, Hoot Gibson, Betty Miles	United States	Trail Blazers serial Western
Wolves of the Range	Sam Newfield	Robert Livingston, Al St. John, I. Stanford Jolley	United States	Lone Rider serial Western
The Woman of the Town	George Archainbaud	Claire Trevor, Albert Dekker, Barry Sullivan	United States	town tamer Western
1944
Arizona Whirlwind	Robert Emmett Tansey	Ken Maynard, Hoot Gibson, Bob Steele	United States	Trail Blazers serial Western
Barbary Coast Gent	Roy Del Ruth	Wallace Beery, Binnie Barnes, John Carradine	United States	comedy Western
Belle of the Yukon	William A. Seiter	Randolph Scott, Gypsy Rose Lee, Dinah Shore, Bob Burns, Charles Winninger, William Marshall, Guinn "Big Boy" Williams, Robert Armstrong, Florence Bates, Victor Kilian, Wanda McKay, Edward Fielding, Jane Hale	United States	traditional Western
The Big Bonanza	George Archainbaud	Jane Frazee, Richard Arlen, George "Gabby" Hayes	United States	revenge Western
Black Arrow	Lew Landers, B. Reeves Eason	Robert Scott, Adele Jergens, Kenneth MacDonald	United States	serial Western
Bordertown Trail	Lesley Selander	Sunset Carson, Smiley Burnette, Weldon Heyburn	United States	Sunset Carson serial Western
Boss of Boomtown	Ray Taylor	Rod Cameron, Tom Tyler, Fuzzy Knight, Vivian Austin	United States	B Western
Brand of the Devil	Harry L. Fraser	Dave O'Brien, James Newill, Ellen Hall	United States	Texas Rangers serial Western
Buffalo Bill	William A. Wellman	Joel McCrea, Maureen O'Hara, Thomas Mitchell, Linda Darnell	United States	biopic Western
Call of the Rockies	Lesley Selander	Sunset Carson, Smiley Burnette, Kirk Alyn, Harry Woods	United States	Sunset Carson serial Western
Can't Help Singing	Frank Ryan	Deanna Durbin, Robert Paige, Akim Tamiroff	United States	musical Western
Cheyenne Wildcat	Lesley Selander	Wild Bill Elliott, Robert Blake, Peggy Stewart	United States	Red Ryder serial Western
Code of the Prairie	Spencer Gordon Bennet	Sunset Carson, Smiley Burnette, Peggy Stewart	United States	Sunset Carson serial Western
Cowboy and the Senorita	Joseph Kane	Roy Rogers, Mary Lee, Dale Evans	United States	Singing cowboy Western
Cowboy Canteen	Lew Landers	Charles Starrett, Jane Frazee, Max Terhune, Tex Ritter	United States	USO song & comedy review Western
Cowboy from Lonesome River	Benjamin H. Kline	Charles Starrett, Vi Athens, Dub Taylor	United States	B Western
Cyclone Prairie Rangers	Benjamin H. Kline	Charles Starrett, Dub Taylor, Constance Worth	United States	B Western
Dead or Alive	Elmer Clifton	Tex Ritter, Dave O'Brien, Marjorie Clements	United States	Texas Rangers serial Western
Firebrands of Arizona	Lesley Selander	Sunset Carson, Smiley Burnette, Peggy Stewart	United States	Sunset Carson serial Western
Forty Thieves	Lesley Selander	William Boyd, Andy Clyde	United States	Hopalong Cassidy serial Western
Frontier Outlaws	Sam Newfield	Buster Crabbe, Al St. John, Charles King	United States	Billy the Kid serial Western
Fuzzy Settles Down	Sam Newfield	Buster Crabbe, Al St. John, Patti McCarty	United States	Billy the Kid serial Western
Gangsters of the Frontier	Elmer Clifton	Tex Ritter, Dave O'Brien, Guy Wilkerson	United States	Texas Rangers serial Western
Gentle Annie	Andrew Marton	Donna Reed, James Craig, Marjorie Main	United States	romance Western
Ghost Guns	Lambert Hillyer	Johnny Mack Brown, Raymond Hatton, Evelyn Finley	United States	B Western
Guns of the Law	Elmer Clifton	Dave O'Brien, Jennifer Holt, James Newill, Guy Wilkerson	United States	Texas Rangers serial Western
Gunsmoke Mesa	Hary L. Fraser	Dave O'Brien, James Newill, Guy Wilkerson	United States	Texas Rangers serial Western
Hands Across the Border	Joseph Kane	Roy Rogers, Guinn "Big Boy" Williams	United States	Singing cowboy Western
Harmony Trail	Robert Emmett Tansey	Ken Maynard, Eddie Dean, Gene Alsace, Max Terhune	United States	Trail Blazers serial Western
Hidden Valley Outlaws	Howard Bretherton	Wild Bill Elliott, George "Gabby" Hayes, Anne Jeffreys	United States	Red Ryder serial Western
Land of the Outlaws	Lambert Hillyer	Johnny Mack Brown, Raymond Hatton, Nan Holliday	United States	B Western
The Last Horseman	William Berke	Russell Hayden, Dub Taylor, Bob Wills	United States	B Western
Law Men	Lambert Hillyer	Johnny Mack Brown, Raymond Hatton, Jan Wiley	United States	B Western
Law of the Valley	Howard Bretherton	Johnny Mack Brown, Raymond Hatton, Lynne Carver	United States	B Western
Lights of Old Santa Fe	Frank McDonald	Roy Rogers, Dale Evans, George "Gabby" Hayes	United States	Singing cowboy Western
Lucky Cowboy	Josef Berne	Eddie Dew, Julie Gibson, Bob Kortman	United States	musical Western short
Lumberjack	Lesley Selander	William Boyd, Andy Clyde	United States	Hopalong Cassidy serial Western
Marked Trails	John P. McCarthy	Hoot Gibson, Bob Steele, Veda Ann Borg	United States	B Western
Marshal of Gunsmoke	Vernon Keays	Tex Ritter, Russell Hayden, Fuzzy Knight	United States	Singing cowboy Western
Marshal of Reno	Wallace Grissell	Wild Bill Elliott, George "Gabby" Hayes, Robert Blake	United States	Red Ryder serial Western
Mystery Man	George Archainbaud	William Boyd, Andy Clyde	United States	Hopalong Cassidy serial Western
Nevada	Edward Killy	Robert Mitchum, Anne Jeffreys	United States	traditional Western
Oath of Vengeance	Sam Newfield	Buster Crabbe, Al St. John, Jack Ingram	United States	Billy the Kid serial Western
The Old Texas Trail	Lewis D. Collins	Rod Cameron, Eddie Dew, Fuzzy Knight	United States	traditional Western
Outlaw Roundup	Harry L. Fraser	Dave O'Brien, James Newill, Guy Wilkerson	United States	Texas Rangers serial Western
Outlaw Trail	Robert Emmett Tansey	Hoot Gibson, Bob Steele, Gene Alsace	United States	Trail Blazers serial Western
Partners of the Trail	Lambert Hillyer	Johnny Mack Brown, Raymond Hatton, Christine McIntyre	United States	B Western
The Pinto Bandit	Elmer Clifton	Dave O'Brien, James Newill, Guy Wilkerson	United States	Texas Rangers serial Western
Raiders of Ghost City	Lewis D. Collins, Ray Taylor	Dennis Moore, Wanda McKay, Lionel Atwill	United States	serial Western
Raiders of the Border	John P. McCarthy	Johnny Mack Brown, Raymond Hatton, Ellen Hall	United States	B Western
Range Law	Lambert Hillyer	Johnny Mack Brown, Raymond Hatton, Sarah Padden	United States	B Western
Riding West	William Berke	Charles Starrett, Shirley Patterson, Arthur Hunnicutt	United States	B Western
The San Antonio Kid	Howard Bretherton	Wild Bill Elliott, Robert Blake, Alice Fleming	United States	Red Ryder serial Western
Saddle Leather Law	Benjamin H. Kline	Charles Starrett, Dub Taylor, Vi Athens	United States	B Western
San Fernando Valley	John English, Yakima Canutt	Roy Rogers, Dale Evans, Jean Porter, Andrew Tombes	United States	Singing cowboy Western
Sheriff of Las Vegas	Lesley Selander	Wild Bill Elliott, Robert Blake, Peggy Stewart	United States	Red Ryder serial Western
Sheriff of Sundown	Lesley Selander	Allan "Rocky" Lane, Linda Stirling, Max Terhune	United States	B Western
Silver City Kid	John English	Allan "Rocky" Lane, Peggy Stewart, Wally Vernon	United States	B Western
Song of Nevada	Joseph Kane	Roy Rogers, Dale Evans, Mary Lee	United States	Singing cowboy Western
Sonora Stagecoach	Robert Emmett Tansey	Hoot Gibson, Bob Steele, Gene Alsace	United States	Trail Blazers serial Western
Spook Town	Elmer Clifton	Dave O'Brien, James Newill, Guy Wilkerson	United States	Texas Rangers serial Western
Stagecoach to Monterey	Lesley Selander	Allan "Rocky" Lane, Peggy Stewart, Wally Vernon	United States	B Western
Sundown Valley	Benjamin H. Kline	Charles Starrett, Dub Taylor, Jeanne Bates	United States	B Western
Swing in the Saddle	Lew Landers	Jane Frazee, Guinn "Big Boy" Williams, Slim Summerville	United States	B Western
Tall in the Saddle	Edwin L. Marin	John Wayne, Ella Raines, Ward Bond, George "Gabby" Hayes	United States	B Western
Texas Masquerade	George Archainbaud	William Boyd, Andy Clyde	United States	Hopalong Cassidy serial Western
Thundering Gun Slingers	Sam Newfield	Buster Crabbe, Frances Gladwin, Al St. John	United States	Billy the Kid serial Western
Trail to Gunsight	Vernon Keays	Eddie Dew, Lyle Talbot, Fuzzy Knight, Ray Whitley	United States	B Western
Trigger Trail	Lewis D. Collins	Rod Cameron, Fuzzy Knight, Eddie Dew	United States	B Western
Tucson Raiders	Spencer Gordon Bennet	Wild Bill Elliott, George "Gabby" Hayes, Robert Blake	United States	Red Ryder serial Western
The Utah Kid	Vernon Keays	Hoot Gibson, Bob Steele, Beatrice Gray	United States	B Western
Vigilantes of Dodge City	Wallace Grissell	Wild Bill Elliott, Robert Blake, Linda Stirling	United States	Red Ryder serial Western
West of the Rio Grande	Lambert Hillyer	Johnny Mack Brown, Raymond Hatton, Christine McIntyre	United States	B Western
Westward Bound	Robert Emmett Tansey	Ken Maynard, Hoot Gibson, Bob Steele, Betty Miles	United States	Trail Blazers serial Western
The Whispering Skull	Elmer Clifton	Tex Ritter, Dave O'Brien, Guy Wilkerson	United States	Texas Rangers serial Western
Wild Horse Phantom	Sam Newfield	Buster Crabbe, Al St. John, Kermit Maynard	United States	Billy the Kid serial Western
Wyoming Hurricane	William Berke	Russell Hayden, Dub Taylor, Bob Wills	United States	B Western
The Yellow Rose of Texas	Joseph Kane	Roy Rogers, Dale Evans, William Haade	United States	Singing cowboy Western
Zorro's Black Whip	Spencer Gordon Bennet, Wallace Grissell	George J. Lewis, Linda Stirling, Lucien Littlefield	United States	serial Western
1945
Along Came Jones	Stuart Heisler	Gary Cooper, Loretta Young, William Demarest, Dan Duryea	United States	comedy Western
Along the Navajo Trail	Frank McDonald	Roy Rogers, Dale Evans, George "Gabby" Hayes	United States	Singing cowboy Western
Bandits of the Badlands	Thomas Carr	Sunset Carson, Peggy Stewart, Si Jenks	United States	Sunset Carson serial Western
Bells of Rosarita	Frank McDonald	Roy Rogers, Dale Evans, George "Gabby" Hayes, Allan "Rocky" Lane, Don "Red" Barry, Sunset Carson	United States	Singing cowboy Western
Blazing the Western Trail	Vernon Keays	Charles Starrett, Tex Harding, Dub Taylor	United States	B Western
Border Badmen	Sam Newfield	Buster Crabbe, Al St. John, Lorraine Miller	United States	Billy the Kid serial Western
Both Barrels Blazing	Derwin Abrahams	Charles Starrett, Tex Harding, Dub Taylor	United States	B Western
The Cherokee Flash	Thomas Carr	Sunset Carson, Linda Stirling, Tom London	United States	Sunset Carson serial Western
The Cisco Kid In Old New Mexico	Phil Rosen	Duncan Renaldo, Martin Garralaga, Gwen Kenyon	United States	The Cisco Kid serial Western
The Cisco Kid Returns	John P. McCarthy	Duncan Renaldo, Martin Garralaga, Eva Puig	United States	The Cisco Kid serial Western
Colorado Pioneers	R.G. Springsteen	Wild Bill Elliott, Robert Blake, Alice Fleming	United States	Red Ryder serial Western
Corpus Christi Bandits	Wallace Grissell	Allan "Rocky" Lane, Helen Talbot, Jack Kirk	United States	B Western
Dakota	Joseph Kane	John Wayne, Walter Brennan, Ward Bond	United States	traditional Western
Don't Fence Me In	John English	Roy Rogers, Dale Evans, George "Gabby" Hayes	United States	Singing cowboy Western
Enemy of the Law	Harry L. Fraser	Tex Ritter, Dave O'Brien, Kay Hughes, Guy Wilkerson	United States	Texas Rangers serial Western
Fighting Bill Carson	Sam Newfield	Buster Crabbe, Al St. John, Kay Hughes	United States	Billy the Kid serial Western
Flame of Barbary Coast	Joseph Kane	John Wayne, Ann Dvorak, Joseph Schildkraut, Virginia Grey	United States	gambler Western
Flame of the West	Lambert Hillyer	Johnny Mack Brown, Raymond Hatton, Joan Woodbury	United States	B Western
Flaming Bullets	Harry L. Fraser	Tex Ritter, Dave O'Brien, Guy Wilkerson	United States	Texas Rangers serial Western
Frontier Feud	Lambert Hillyer	Johnny Mack Brown, Raymond Hatton, Christine McIntyre	United States	B Western
Frontier Fugitives	Harry L. Fraser	Tex Ritter, Dave O'Brien, Guy Wilkerson	United States	Texas Rangers serial Western
Gangster's Den	Sam Newfield	Buster Crabbe, Al St. John, Sydney Logan	United States	B Western
Great Stagecoach Robbery	Lesley Selander	Wild Bill Elliott, Robert Blake, Alice Fleming	United States	Red Ryder serial Western
Gun Smoke	Howard Bretherton	Johnny Mack Brown, Raymond Hatton, Jennifer Holt	United States	B Western
His Brother's Ghost	Sam Newfield	Buster Crabbe, Al St. John, Charles King	United States	Billy the Kid serial Western
Jeep Herders	Harvey Parry, Richard Talmadge	John Daheim, June Carlson, Pat Michaels	United States	Modern Western
Lawless Empire	Vernon Keays	Charles Starrett, Tex Harding, Dub Taylor	United States	B Western
Lightning Raiders	Sam Newfield	Buster Crabbe, Al St. John, Mady Lawrence	United States	Billy the Kid serial Western
Lone Texas Ranger	Spencer Gordon Bennet	Wild Bill Elliott, Robert Blake, Alice Fleming	United States	Red Ryder serial Western
The Lost Trail	Lambert Hillyer	Johnny Mack Brown, Raymond Hatton, Jennifer Holt	United States	B Western
The Man from Oklahoma	Frank McDonald	Roy Rogers, Dale Evans, George "Gabby" Hayes	United States	Singing cowboy Western
Marked for Murder	Elmer Clifton	Tex Ritter, Dave O'Brien, Guy Wilkerson	United States	Texas Rangers serial Western
Marshal of Laredo	R.G. Springsteen	Wild Bill Elliott, Robert Blake, Peggy Stewart	United States	Red Ryder serial Western
The Navajo Trail	Howard Bretherton	Johnny Mack Brown, Raymond Hatton, Jennifer Holt	United States	B Western
Northwest Trail	Derwin Abrahams	Bob Steele, Joan Woodbury	United States	Canadian Mountie Western
Oregon Trail	Thomas Carr	Sunset Carson, Peggy Stewart, Frank Jaquet	United States	Sunset Carson serial Western
Outlaws of the Rockies	Ray Nazarro	Charles Starrett, Tex Harding, Dub Taylor	United States	B Western
Phantom of the Plains	Lesley Selander	Wild Bill Elliott, Robert Blake, Alice Fleming	United States	Red Ryder serial Western
Prairie Rustlers	Sam Newfield	Buster Crabbe, Al St. John, Evelyn Finley	United States	Billy the Kid serial Western
Renegades of the Rio Grande	Howard Bretherton	Rod Cameron, Eddie Dew, Fuzzy Knight, Jennifer Holt	United States	B Western
The Return of the Durango Kid	Derwin Abrahams	Charles Starrett, Tex Harding	United States	B Western
Rhythm Round-Up	Vernon Keays	Ken Curtis, Cheryl Walker, Guinn "Big Boy" Williams, Raymond Hatton, Bob Wills	United States	Singing cowboy/musical review Western
Rockin' in the Rockies	Vernon Keays	Moe Howard, Larry Fine, Curly Howard	United States	Three Stooges musical Western
Rough Riders of Cheyenne	Thomas Carr	Sunset Carson, Peggy Stewart, Monte Hale	United States	Sunset Carson serial Western
Rough Ridin' Justice	Derwin Abrahams	Charles Starrett, Dub Taylor, Betty Jane Graham	United States	B Western
Rustler's Hideout	Sam Newfield	Buster Crabbe, Al St. John, Patti McCarty	United States	Billy the Kid serial Western
Rustlers of the Badlands	Derwin Abrahams	Charles Starrett, Tex Harding, Dub Taylor	United States	B Western
Sagebrush Heroes	Benjamin H. Kline	Charles Starrett, Dub Taylor	United States	B Western
Salome Where She Danced	Charles Lamont	Yvonne De Carlo, Rod Cameron, David Bruce	United States	adult Western
San Antonio	David Butler	Errol Flynn, Alexis Smith	United States	town-tamer Western
Santa Fe Saddlemates	Thomas Carr	Sunset Carson, Linda Stirling, Olin Howland	United States	Sunset Carson serial Western
Saratoga Trunk	Sam Wood	Gary Cooper, Ingrid Bergman	United States	traditional Western
Shadows of Death	Sam Newfield	Buster Crabbe, Al St. John, Dona Dax	United States	Billy the Kid serial Western
Sheriff of Cimarron	Yakima Canutt	Sunset Carson, Linda Stirling, Olin Howland	United States	Sunset Carson serial Western
Sing Me a Song of Texas	Vernon Keays	Rosemary Lane, Tom Tyler, Guinn "Big Boy" Williams, Slim Summerville, Carole Mathews, Noah Beery, Pinky Tomlin	United States	Singing cowboy/musical review Western
Song of Old Wyoming	Robert Emmett Tansey	Eddie Dean, Sarah Padden, Lash LaRue	United States	Singing cowboy Western
Song of the Prairie	Ray Nazarro	Ken Curtis, June Storey, Andy Clyde, Guinn "Big Boy" Williams	United States	Singing cowboy/musical review Western
South of the Rio Grande	Lambert Hillyer	Duncan Renaldo, Martin Garralaga, Armida	United States	The Cisco Kid serial Western
Stagecoach Outlaws	Sam Newfield	Buster Crabbe, Al St. John, Frances Gladwin	United States	Billy the Kid serial Western
Stranger from Santa Fe	Lambert Hillyer	Johnny Mack Brown, Raymond Hatton, Beatrice Gray	United States	B Western
Sunset in El Dorado	Frank McDonald	Roy Rogers, Dale Evans, George "Gabby" Hayes	United States	Singing cowboy Western
Texas Panhandle	Ray Nazarro	Charles Starrett, Tex Harding, Dub Taylor	United States	B Western
Three in the Saddle	Harry L. Fraser	Tex Ritter, Dave O'Brien, Guy Wilkerson	United States	Texas Rangers serial Western
Thunderhead, Son of Flicka	Louis King	Roddy McDowall, Preston Foster, Rita Johnson	United States	family Western
The Topeka Terror	Howard Bretherton	Allan "Rocky" Lane, Linda Stirling, Earle Hodgins	United States	B Western
Trail of Kit Carson	Lesley Selander	Allan "Rocky" Lane, Helen Talbot, Tom London	United States	B Western
Utah	John English	Roy Rogers, Dale Evans, George "Gabby" Hayes	United States	Singing cowboy Western
Wagon Wheels Westward	R.G. Springsteen	Wild Bill Elliott, Robert Blake, Alice Fleming	United States	Red Ryder serial Western
Wanderer of the Wasteland	Wallace Grissell, Edward Killy	James Warren, Richard Martin, Audrey Long	United States	revenge Western
West of the Pecos	Edward Killy	Robert Mitchum, Barbara Hale, Richard Martin	United States	bandit Western
Wildfire	Robert Emmett Tansey	Bob Steele, Sterling Holloway, John Miljan	United States	B Western
1946
Abilene Town	Edwin L. Marin	Randolph Scott, Rhonda Fleming, Ann Dvorak, Edgar Buchanan	United States	town tamer Western
Alias Billy the Kid	Thomas Carr	Sunset Carson, Peggy Stewart, Tom London	United States	Sunset Carson serial Western
Bad Bascomb	S. Sylvan Simon	Wallace Beery, Margaret O'Brien	United States	traditional Western
Badman's Territory	Tim Whelan	Randolph Scott, Ann Richards, George 'Gabby' Hayes	United States	traditional Western
Beauty and the Bandit	William Nigh	Gilbert Roland, Martin Garralaga, Ramsay Ames	United States	The Cisco Kid serial Western
Border Bandits	Lambert Hillyer	Johnny Mack Brown, Raymond Hatton, Rosa del Rosario	United States	B Western
California Gold Rush	R.G. Springsteen	Wild Bill Elliott, Robert Blake, Alice Fleming	United States	Red Ryder serial Western
Canyon Passage	Jacques Tourneur	Dana Andrews, Brian Donlevy, Susan Hayward	United States	traditional Western
The Caravan Trail	Robert Emmett Tansey	Eddie Dean, Lash LaRue, Jean Carlin	United States	Singing cowboy Western
Conquest of Cheyenne	R.G. Springsteen	Wild Bill Elliott, Robert Blake, Alice Fleming	United States	Red Ryder serial Western
Cowboy Blues	Ray Nazarro	Ken Curtis, Jeff Donnell, Guy Kibbee, Guinn "Big Boy" Williams	United States	Singing cowboy/musical review Western
Days of Buffalo Bill	Thomas Carr	Sunset Carson, Peggy Stewart, Tom London	United States	Sunset Carson serial Western
The Desert Horseman	Ray Nazarro	Charles Starrett, Adelle Roberts, Smiley Burnette	United States	B Western
The Devil's Playground	George Archainbaud	William Boyd, Andy Clyde	United States	Hopalong Cassidy serial Western
Drifting Along	Derwin Abrahams	Johnny Mack Brown, Raymond Hatton, Lynne Carver	United States	B Western
Duel in the Sun	King Vidor	Gregory Peck, Jennifer Jones, Joseph Cotten	United States	adult Western
The El Paso Kid	Thomas Carr	Sunset Carson, Marie Harmon, Hank Patterson	United States	Sunset Carson serial Western
The Fighting Frontiersman	Derwin Abrahams	Charles Starrett, Helen Mowery, Smiley Burnette	United States	B Western
Frontier Gunlaw	Derwin Abrahams	Charles Starrett, Tex Harding, Dub Taylor	United States	B Western
Galloping Thunder	Ray Nazarro	Charles Starrett, Adelle Roberts, Smiley Burnette	United States	B Western
The Gay Cavalier	William Nigh	Gilbert Roland, Martin Garralaga, Ramsay Ames	United States	The Cisco Kid serial Western
The Gentleman from Texas	Lambert Hillyer	Johnny Mack Brown, Raymond Hatton, Claudia Drake	United States	B Western
Gentlemen with Guns	Sam Newfield	Buster Crabbe, Al St. John, Patricia Knox	United States	Billy the Kid serial Western
Ghost of Hidden Valley	Sam Newfield	Buster Crabbe, Al St. John, Jean Carlin	United States	Billy the Kid serial Western
God's Country	Robert Emmett Tansey	Robert Lowery, William Farnum, Buster Keaton	United States	contemporary Western
Gunning for Vengeance	Ray Nazarro	Charles Starrett, Marjean Neville, Smiley Burnette	United States	B Western
The Harvey Girls	George Sidney	Judy Garland, John Hodiak, Ray Bolger	United States	musical Western
The Haunted Mine	Derwin Abrahams	Johnny Mack Brown, Raymond Hatton, Linda Leighton	United States	B Western
Heading West	Ray Nazarro	Charles Starrett, Doris Houck, Smiley Burnette	United States	B Western
Heldorado	William Witney	Roy Rogers, Dale Evans, George "Gabby" Hayes	United States	Singing cowboy Western
Home in Oklahoma	William Witney	Roy Rogers, Dale Evans, George "Gabby" Hayes	United States	Singing cowboy Western
Home on the Range	R.G. Springsteen	Monte Hale, Bob Nolan, Lorna Gray	United States	B Western
In Old Sacramento	Joseph Kane	Wild Bill Elliott, Constance Moore	United States	traditional Western
Landrush	Vernon Keays	Charles Starrett, Doris Houck, Smiley Burnette	United States	B Western
Lone Star Moonlight	Ray Nazarro	Ken Curtis, Joan Barton, Guy Kibbee	United States	Singing cowboy/musical review Western
The Man from Rainbow Valley	R.G. Springsteen	Monte Hale, Ferris Taylor, Lorna Gray	United States	B Western
My Darling Clementine	John Ford	Henry Fonda, Victor Mature, Linda Darnell, Ward Bond, Walter Brennan, Tim Holt	United States	traditional Western
My Pal Trigger	Frank McDonald	Roy Rogers, George 'Gabby' Hayes	United States	Singing cowboy Western
'Neath Canadian Skies	B. Reeves Eason	Russell Hayden, Inez Cooper, Douglas Fowley	United States	Northern Western
North of the Border	B. Reeves Eason	Russell Hayden, Douglas Fowley, Lyle Talbot	United States	B Western
Out California Way	Lesley Selander	Roy Rogers, Monte Hale, Lorna Gray, Robert Blake, Allan "Rocky" Lane	United States	Singing cowboy Western
Outlaws of the Plains	Sam Newfield	Buster Crabbe, Al St. John, Patti McCarty	United States	Billy the Kid serial Western
The Overlanders	Harry Watt	Chips Rafferty, John Nugent Hayward, Daphne Campbell	United Kingdom, Australia	traditional Western
Overland Riders	Sam Newfield	Buster Crabbe, Al St. John, Patti McCarty	United States	Billy the Kid serial Western
The Phantom Rider	Spencer Gordon Bennet, Fred C. Brannon	Robert Kent, Peggy Stewart, LeRoy Mason	United States	serial Western
Prairie Badmen	Sam Newfield	Buster Crabbe, Al St. John, Patricia Knox	United States	Billy the Kid serial Western
Rainbow Over Texas	Frank McDonald	Roy Rogers, Dale Evans, George "Gabby" Hayes	United States	Singing cowboy Western
Red River Renegades	Thomas Carr	Sunset Carson, Peggy Stewart, Tom London	United States	Sunset Carson serial Western
Renegade Girl	William Berke	Ann Savage, Alan Curtis, Edward Brophy	United States	B Western
Renegades	George Sherman	Evelyn Keyes, Willard Parker, Larry Parks, Edgar Buchanan	United States	traditional Western
Rio Grande Raiders	Thomas Carr	Sunset Carson, Linda Stirling, Bob Steele	United States	Sunset Carson serial Western
Roaring Rangers	Ray Nazarro	Charles Starrett, Adelle Roberts, Merle Travis	United States	B Western
Roll on Texas Moon	William Witney	Roy Rogers, Dale Evans, George "Gabby" Hayes	United States	Singing cowboy Western
Santa Fe Uprising	R.G. Springsteen	Allan "Rocky" Lane, Robert Blake, Martha Wentworth	United States	Red Ryder serial Western
The Scarlet Horseman	Lewis D. Collins, Ray Taylor	Peter Cookson, Paul Guilfoyle, Janet Shaw	United States	adventure Western
Shadows on the Range	Lambert Hillyer	Johnny Mack Brown, Raymond Hatton, Jan Bryant	United States	B Western
Sheriff of Redwood Valley	R.G. Springsteen	Wild Bill Elliott, Robert Blake, Bob Steele	United States	Red Ryder serial Western
Silver Range	Lambert Hillyer	Johnny Mack Brown, Raymond Hatton, Jan Bryant	United States	B Western
Singing on the Trail	Ray Nazarro	Ken Curtis, Jeff Donnell, Guy Kibbee, Guinn "Big Boy" Williams	United States	Singing cowboy/musical review Western
Singin' in the Corn	Del Lord	Judy Canova, Allen Jenkins, Guinn "Big Boy" Williams	United States	Singing cowboy/musical review Western
Sioux City Sue	Frank McDonald	Gene Autry, Lynne Roberts, Sterling Holloway	United States	Singing cowboy Western
Smoky	Louis King	Fred MacMurray, Anne Baxter	United States	Traditional Western
Song of Arizona	Frank McDonald	Roy Rogers, Dale Evans, George "Gabby" Hayes	United States	Singing cowboy Western
South of Monterey	William Nigh	Gilbert Roland, Martin Garralaga, Marjorie Riordan	United States	The Cisco Kid serial Western
Stagecoach to Denver	R.G. Springsteen	Allan "Rocky" Lane, Robert Blake, Martha Wentworth	United States	Red Ryder serial Western
Stars Over Texas	Robert Emmett Tansey	Eddie Dean, Roscoe Ates, Shirley Patterson	United States	Singing cowboy Western
Sun Valley Cyclone	R.G. Springsteen	Wild Bill Elliott, Robert Blake, Alice Fleming	United States	Red Ryder serial Western
Sunset Pass	William A. Berke	James Warren, Nan Leslie, John Laurenz	United States	B Western
Terror Trail	Ray Nazarro	Charles Starrett, Barbara Pepper, Smiley Burnette	United States	B Western
Terrors on Horseback	Sam Newfield	Buster Crabbe, Al St. John, Patti McCarty	United States	Billy the Kid serial Western
That Texas Jamboree	Ray Nazarro	Ken Curtis, Jeff Donnell, Andy Clyde, Guinn "Big Boy" Williams	United States	Singing cowboy/musical review Western
Throw a Saddle on a Star	Ray Nazarro	Ken Curtis, Jeff Donnell, Andy Clyde, Guinn "Big Boy" Williams	United States	Singing cowboy/musical review Western
Trigger Fingers	Lambert Hillyer	Johnny Mack Brown, Raymond Hatton, Jennifer Holt	United States	B Western
Two-Fisted Stranger	Ray Nazarro	Charles Starrett, Doris Houck, Smiley Burnette	United States	B Western
Under Arizona Skies	Lambert Hillyer	Johnny Mack Brown, Raymond Hatton, Reno Browne	United States	B Western
Under Nevada Skies	Frank McDonald	Roy Rogers, Dale Evans, George "Gabby" Hayes	United States	Singing cowboy Western
The Virginian	Stuart Gilmore	Joel McCrea, Brian Donlevy	United States	B Western
Wild West	Robert Emmett Tansey	Eddie Dean, Lash LaRue, Sarah Padden, Roscoe Ates	United States	Singing cowboy Western
The Yearling	Clarence Brown	Gregory Peck, Jane Wyman	United States	family Western
1947
Angel and the Badman	James Edward Grant	John Wayne, Gail Russell	United States	traditional Western
Along the Oregon Trail	R.G. Springsteen	Monte Hale, Clayton Moore, Lorna Gray	United States	B Western
Apache Rose	William Witney	Roy Rogers, Dale Evans	United States	Singing cowboy Western
Bandits of Dark Canyon	Philip Ford	Allan "Rocky" Lane, Bob Steele, Eddy Waller	United States	B Western
Black Gold	Phil Karlson	Anthony Quinn, Katherine DeMille 'Ducky' Louie	United States	traditional Western
Bells of San Angelo	William Witney	Roy Rogers, Trigger, Dale Evans, Andy Devine	United States	Singing cowboy Western
Bells of San Fernando	Terry O. Morse	Donald Woods, Gloria Warren, Byron Foulger	United States	B Western
Border Feud	Ray Taylor	Lash LaRue, Al St. John, Gloria Marlen	United States	Cheyenne Davis serial Western
Bowery Buckaroos	William Beaudine	Leo Gorcey, Huntz Hall	United States	The Bowery Boys serial/comedy Western
Buckaroo from Powder River	Ray Nazarro	Charles Starrett, Eve Miller, Smiley Burnette	United States	B Western
California	John Farrow	Ray Milland, Barbara Stanwyck, Barry Fitzgerald, George Coulouris, Anthony Quinn	United States	traditional Western
Cheyenne	Raoul Walsh	Dennis Morgan, Jane Wyman, Janis Paige	United States	traditional Western
Cheyenne Takes Over	Ray Taylor	Lash LaRue, Al St. John, Nancy Gates	United States	Cheyenne Davis serial Western
Code of the Saddle	Thomas Carr	Johnny Mack Brown, Raymond Hatton, Kay Morley	United States	B Western
Code of the West	William A. Berke	James Warren, Debra Alden	United States	B Western
Dangerous Venture	George Archainbaud	William Boyd, Andy Clyde	United States	Hopalong Cassidy serial Western
The Fabulous Texan	Edward Ludwig	Wild Bill Elliott, John Carroll	United States	traditional Western
The Fighting Vigilantes	Ray Taylor	Lash LaRue, Al St. John, Jennifer Holt	United States	Cheyenne Davis serial Western
Flashing Guns	Lambert Hillyer	Johnny Mack Brown, Raymond Hatton, Jan Bryant	United States	B Western
Fool's Gold	George Archainbaud	William Boyd, Andy Clyde	United States	Hopalong Cassidy serial Western
The Fugitive	John Ford	Henry Fonda, Dolores del Río, Pedro Armendáriz	United States, Mexico	traditional Western
Gas House Kids Go West	William Beaudine	Carl Switzer, Tommy Bond\, William Wright	United States	Cheyenne Davis serial Western
Ghost Town Renegades	Ray Taylor	Lash LaRue, Al St. John, Jennifer Holt	United States	Modern Western comedy
Gun Talk	Lambert Hillyer	Johnny Mack Brown, Raymond Hatton, Christine McIntyre	United States	B Western
Gunfighters	George Waggner	Randolph Scott, Bruce Cabot, Barbara Britton	United States	traditional Western
Heaven Only Knows	Albert S. Rogell	Robert Cummings, Brian Donlevy, Marjorie Reynolds	United States	traditional Western
Homesteaders of Paradise Valley	R.G. Springsteen	Allan "Rocky" Lane, Robert Blake, Martha Wentworth	United States	Red Ryder serial Western
Hoppy's Holiday	George Archainbaud	William Boyd, Andy Clyde	United States	Hopalong Cassidy serial Western
Jesse James Rides Again	Fred C. Brannon, Thomas Carr	Clayton Moore, Roy Barcroft, Linda Stirling	United States	serial Western
King of the Bandits	Christy Cabanne	Gilbert Roland, Chris-Pin Martin, Angela Greene	United States	The Cisco Kid serial Western
King of the Wild Horses	George Archainbaud	Preston Foster, Gail Patrick, Billy Sheffield	United States	traditional Western
Land of the Lawless	Lambert Hillyer	Johnny Mack Brown, Raymond Hatton, Christine McIntyre	United States	B Western
Last Days of Boot Hill	Ray Nazarro	Charles Starrett, Virginia Hunter, Smiley Burnette	United States	B Western
Last Frontier Uprising	Lesley Selander	Monte Hale, Malcolm "Bud" McTaggart, Lorna Gray	United States	B Western
Last of the Redmen	George Sherman	Jon Hall, Michael Shea	United States	traditional Western
The Last Round-Up	John English	Gene Autry, Iron Eyes Cody, Jay Silverheels, Jean Heather	United States	Singing cowboy Western
The Law Comes to Gunsight	Lambert Hillyer	Johnny Mack Brown, Raymond Hatton, Reno Browne	United States	B Western
Law of the Canyon	Ray Nazarro	Charles Starrett, Nancy Saunders, Smiley Burnette	United States	B Western
Law of the Lash	Ray Taylor	Lash LaRue, Al St. John	United States	Cheyenne Davis serial Western
The Lone Hand Texan	Ray Nazarro	Charles Starrett, Smiley Burnette	United States	B Western
The Marauders	George Archainbaud	William Boyd, Andy Clyde	United States	Hopalong Cassidy serial Western
Marshal of Cripple Creek	R.G. Springsteen	Allan "Rocky" Lane, Robert Blake, Martha Wentworth	United States	Red Ryder serial Western
The Michigan Kid	Ray Taylor	Jon Hall, Victor McLaglen, Rita Johnson, Andy Devine	United States	B Western
Northwest Outpost	Allan Dwan	Nelson Eddy, Ilona Massey	United States	traditional Western
On the Old Spanish Trail	William Witney	Roy Rogers, Tito Guízar, Andy Devine, Jane Frazee	United States	Singing cowboy Western
Oregon Trail Scouts	R.G. Springsteen	Allan "Rocky" Lane, Robert Blake, Martha Wentworth	United States	Red Ryder serial Western
Out West	Edward Bernds	Moe Howard, Larry Fine, Shemp Howard, Christine McIntyre, Jock Mahoney	United States	3 Stooges Western short
Over the Santa Fe Trail	Ray Nazarro	Ken Curtis, Jennifer Holt, Guinn "Big Boy" Williams	United States	Singing cowboy/musical review Western
Pioneer Justice	Ray Taylor	Lash LaRue, Al St. John, Jennifer Holt	United States	Cheyenne Davis serial Western
Prairie Express	Lambert Hillyer	Johnny Mack Brown, Raymond Hatton, Virginia Belmont	United States	B Western
Prairie Raiders	Derwin Abrahams	Charles Starrett, Nancy Saunders, Smiley Burnette	United States	B Western
Pirates of Monterey	Alfred L. Werker	Maria Montez, Rod Cameron, Mikhail Rasumny, Phillip Reed, Gilbert Roland, Gale Sondergaard	United States	California independence Western
Pursued	Raoul Walsh	Robert Mitchum, Teresa Wright, Alan Hale	United States	noir Western
Raiders of the South	Lambert Hillyer	Johnny Mack Brown, Raymond Hatton, Evelyn Brent	United States	B Western
Ramrod	André de Toth	Joel McCrea, Veronica Lake, Charles Ruggles, Lloyd Bridges	United States	traditional Western
The Red Stallion	Lesley Selander	Robert Paige, Noreen Nash, Ted Donaldson	United States	family Western
Return of the Lash	Ray Taylor	Lash LaRue, Al St. John, Mary Maynard	United States	Cheyenne Davis serial Western
Riders of the Lone Star	Derwin Abrahams	Charles Starrett, Virginia Hunter, Smiley Burnette	United States	B Western
Riding the California Trail	William Nigh	Gilbert Roland, Martin Garralaga, Teala Loring	United States	The Cisco Kid serial Western
Robin Hood of Monterey	Christy Cabanne	Gilbert Roland, Chris-Pin Martin, Evelyn Brent	United States	The Cisco Kid serial Western
Robin Hood of Texas	Lesley Selander	Gene Autry, Lynne Roberts, Sterling Holloway	United States	Singing cowboy Western
The Romance of Rosy Ridge	Roy Rowland	Van Johnson, Thomas Mitchell, Janet Leigh	United States	traditional Western
Rustlers of Devil's Canyon	R.G. Springsteen	Allan "Rocky" Lane, Robert Blake, Martha Wentworth	United States	Red Ryder serial Western
Saddle Pals	Lesley Selander	Gene Autry, Lynne Roberts, Sterling Holloway	United States	Singing cowboy Western
The Sea of Grass	Elia Kazan	Spencer Tracy, Katharine Hepburn, Melvyn Douglas	United States	dramatic Western
Smoky River Serenade	Derwin Abrahams	Paul Campbell, Ruth Terry, Guinn "Big Boy" Williams, Virginia Hunter, Carolina Cotton, Cottonseed Clark	United States	Singing cowboy/musical review Western
South of the Chisholm Trail	Derwin Abrahams	Charles Starrett, Nancy Saunders, Smiley Burnette	United States	B Western
Springtime in the Sierras	William Witney	Roy Rogers, Jane Frazee, Andy Devine	United States	Singing cowboy Western
Stage to Mesa City	Ray Taylor	Lash LaRue, Al St. John, Jennifer Holt	United States	Cheyenne Davis serial Western
Stallion Road	James V. Kern	Ronald Reagan, Alexis Smith, Zachary Scott	United States	family Western
The Stranger from Ponca City	Derwin Abrahams	Charles Starrett, Virginia Hunter, Smiley Burnette	United States	B Western
Swing the Western Way	Derwin Abrahams	Jack Leonard, Mary Dugan, Thurston Hall, Regina Wallace, Tris Coffin, Sam Flint	United States	Singing cowboy/musical review Western
Thunder in the Valley	Louis King	Lon McCallister, Peggy Ann Garner, Edmund Gwenn	United States	family Western
Thunder Mountain	Lew Landers	Tim Holt, Martha Hyer, Jason Robards Sr.	United States	B Western
Trail of the Mounties	Howard Bretherton	Russell Hayden, Jennifer Holt, Emmett Lynn	United States	Canadian Mountie Western
Trail Street	Ray Enright	Randolph Scott, Joel McCrea, Frances Dee, Charles Bickford	United States	traditional Western
Trail to San Antone	John English	Gene Autry, Peggy Stewart, Sterling Holloway	United States	Singing cowboy Western
Trailing Danger	Lambert Hillyer	Johnny Mack Brown, Raymond Hatton, Peggy Wynne	United States	B Western
Twilight on the Rio Grande	Frank McDonald	Gene Autry, Sterling Holloway, Adele Mara	United States	Singing cowboy Western
Unconquered	Cecil B. DeMille	Gary Cooper, Paulette Goddard, Boris Karloff, Ward Bond	United States	frontier Western
Under Colorado Skies	R.G. Springsteen	Monte Hale, Paul Hurst, Lorna Gray	United States	B Western
Under the Tonto Rim	Lew Landers	Tim Holt, Nan Leslie, Richard Martin	United States	B Western
Unexpected Guest	George Archainbaud	William Boyd, Andy Clyde	United States	Hopalong Cassidy serial Western
Valley of Fear	Lambert Hillyer	Johnny Mack Brown, Raymond Hatton, Christine McIntyre	United States	B Western
The Vigilante	Wallace Fox	Ralph Byrd, Lyle Talbot	United States	Vigilante serial Western
Vigilantes of Boomtown	R.G. Springsteen	Allan "Rocky" Lane, Robert Blake, Martha Wentworth	United States	Red Ryder serial Western
The Vigilantes Return	Ray Taylor	Jon Hall, Margaret Lindsay, Andy Devine	United States	B Western
West of Dodge City	Ray Nazarro	Charles Starrett, Nancy Saunders, Smiley Burnette	United States	B Western
Where the North Begins	Howard Bretherton	Russell Hayden, Jennifer Holt, Tristram Coffin	United States	Canadian Mountie Western
Wild Country	Ray Taylor	Eddie Dean, Roscoe Ates, I. Stanford Jolley	United States	Singing cowboy Western
The Wild Frontier	Philip Ford	Allan "Rocky" Lane, Jack Holt, Eddy Waller	United States	B Western
Wild Horse Mesa	Wallace Grissell	Tim Holt, Nan Leslie, Richard Martin	United States	B Western
The Wistful Widow of Wagon Gap	Charles Barton	Bud Abbott, Lou Costello, Marjorie Main	United States	comedy Western
Wyoming	Joseph Kane	Wild Bill Elliott, Vera Ralston, George "Gabby" Hayes, Albert Dekker	United States	ranchers vs. settlers Western
1948
3 Godfathers	John Ford	John Wayne, Harry Carey Jr., Pedro Armendáriz, Ward Bond	United States	outlaw Western
Adventures in Silverado	Phil Karlson	William Bishop, Gloria Henry, Edgar Buchanan	United States	traditional Western
Adventures of Frank and Jesse James	Fred C. Brannon, Yakima Canutt	Clayton Moore, Steve Darrell, Noel Neill	United States	serial Western
Adventures of Gallant Bess	Lew Landers	Cameron Mitchell, Audrey Long	United States	B Western
Albuquerque	Ray Enright	Randolph Scott, Barbara Britton, Gabby Hayes	United States	traditional Western
Angel in Exile	Allan Dwan, Philip Ford,	John Carroll, Adele Mara	United States	traditional Western
The Arizona Ranger	John Rawlins	Tim Holt, Jack Holt, Nan Leslie	United States	B Western
The Arkansas Swing	Ray Nazarro	The Hoosier Hot Shots, Gloria Henry, June Vincent, Elinor Donahue, Cottonseed Clark	United States	Singing comedy/musical review Western
Back Trail	Christy Cabanne	Johnny Mack Brown, Raymond Hatton, Mildred Coles	United States	B Western
Black Bart	George Sherman	Yvonne De Carlo, Dan Duryea, Jeffrey Lynn	United States	outlaw Western
Black Eagle	Robert Gordon	William Bishop, Virginia Patton, Gordon Jones	United States	traditional Western
Blazing Across the Pecos	Ray Nazarro	Charles Starrett, Patricia Barry, Smiley Burnette	United States	B Western
Blood on the Moon	Robert Wise	Robert Mitchum, Barbara Bel Geddes, Robert Preston, Walter Brennan, Phyllis Thaxter, Frank Faylen, Tom Tully	United States	Noir Western
The Bold Frontiersman	Philip Ford	Allan "Rocky" Lane, Eddy Waller, Roy Barcroft	United States	B Western
Borrowed Trouble	George Archainbaud	William Boyd, Andy Clyde	United States	Hopalong Cassidy serial Western
California Firebrand	Philip Ford	Monte Hale, Paul Hurst, Lorna Gray	United States	B Western
Carson City Raiders	Yakima Canutt	Allan "Rocky" Lane, Eddy Waller, Frank Reicher	United States	B Western
Coroner Creek	Ray Enright	Randolph Scott, Marguerite Chapman, Edgar Buchanan	United States	traditional Western
Crossed Trails	Lambert Hillyer	Johnny Mack Brown, Raymond Hatton, Lynne Carver	United States	B Western
The Dead Don't Dream	George Archainbaud	William Boyd, Andy Clyde	United States	Hopalong Cassidy serial Western
Dead Man's Gold	Ray Taylor	Lash LaRue, Al St. John, Peggy Stewart	United States	Lash LaRue serial Western
Deadline	Oliver Drake	Sunset Carson, Al Terry, Pat Starling	United States	Sunset Carson serial Western
The Denver Kid	Philip Ford	Allan "Rocky" Lane, Eddy Waller, William Henry	United States	B Western
Desperadoes of Dodge City	Philip Ford	Allan "Rocky" Lane, Eddy Waller, Mildred Coles	United States	B Western
The Dude Goes West	Kurt Neumann	Eddie Albert, Gale Storm	United States	comedy Western
El Dorado Pass	Ray Nazarro	Charles Starrett, Elena Verdugo, Smiley Burnette	United States	B Western
Eyes of Texas	William Witney	Roy Rogers, Andy Devine, Lynne Roberts	United States	Singing cowboy Western
False Paradise	George Archainbaud	William Boyd, Andy Clyde, Rand Brooks	United States	Hopalong Cassidy serial Western
The Far Frontier	William Witney	Roy Rogers, Andy Devine, Clayton Moore	United States	Singing cowboy Western
Fighting Mustang	Oliver Drake	Sunset Carson, Al Terry, Pat Starling	United States	Sunset Carson serial Western
The Fighting Ranger	Lambert Hillyer	Johnny Mack Brown, Raymond Hatton, Christine Larsen	United States	B Western
Fort Apache	John Ford	John Wayne, Henry Fonda, Shirley Temple, Pedro Armendáriz, Ward Bond, George O'Brien, Victor McLaglen, Dick Foran	United States	cavalry Western
Four Faces West	Alfred E. Green	Joel McCrea, Frances Dee, Charles Bickford	United States	traditional Western
Frontier Agent	Lambert Hillyer	Johnny Mack Brown, Raymond Hatton, Reno Browne	United States	B Western
Frontier Revenge	Ray Taylor	Lash LaRue, Al St. John, Peggy Stewart	United States	Lash LaRue serial Western
Fury at Furnace Creek	H. Bruce Humberstone	Victor Mature, Coleen Gray, Glenn Langan	United States	traditional Western
The Gallant Legion	Joseph Kane	Wild Bill Elliott, Lorna Gray, Joseph Schildkraut, Bruce Cabot	United States	traditional Western
The Gay Ranchero	William Witney	Roy Rogers, Andy Devine	United States	Singing cowboy Western
Grand Canyon Trail	William Witney	Roy Rogers, Andy Devine	United States	Singing cowboy Western
Green Grass of Wyoming	Louis King	Peggy Cummins, Charles Coburn	United States	family Western
Gun Smugglers	Frank McDonald	Tim Holt, Martha Hyer, Richard Martin	United States	B Western
Guns of Hate	Lesley Selander	Tim Holt, Nan Leslie, Richard Martin	United States	B Western
Gunning for Justice	Ray Taylor	Johnny Mack Brown, Raymond Hatton, Max Terhune, Evelyn Finley	United States	B Western
The Hawk of Powder River	Ray Taylor	Eddie Dean, Roscoe Ates, Jennifer Holt	United States	Singing cowboy Western
Hidden Danger	Ray Taylor	Johnny Mack Brown, Raymond Hatton, Max Terhune	United States	B Western
Indian Agent	Lesley Selander	Tim Holt, Noah Beery Jr., Richard Martin	United States	B Western
The Kissing Bandit	László Benedek	Frank Sinatra, Kathryn Grayson, Ricardo Montalbán, Ann Miller	United States	comedy/musical Western
Last of the Wild Horses	Robert L. Lippert	James Ellison, Mary Beth Hughes, Jane Frazee	United States	traditional Western
Loaded Pistols	John English	Gene Autry, Barbara Britton, Chill Wills	United States	Singing cowboy Western
The Man from Colorado	Henry Levin	Glenn Ford, William Holden	United States	traditional Western
Mark of the Lash	Ray Taylor	Lash LaRue, Al St. John, Suzi Crandall	United States	Lash LaRue serial Western
Marshal of Amarillo	Philip Ford	Allan "Rocky" Lane, Eddy Waller, Mildred Coles	United States	B Western
Night Time in Nevada	William Witney	Roy Rogers, Andy Devine, Adele Mara	United States	Singing cowboy Western
Northwest Stampede	Albert S. Rogell	Joan Leslie, James Craig, Jack Oakie	United States	Northern Western
Oklahoma Badlands	Yakima Canutt	Allan "Rocky" Lane, Eddy Waller, Mildred Coles	United States	B Western
Old Los Angeles	Joseph Kane	Wild Bill Elliott, John Carroll, Catherine McLeod, Joseph Schildkraut	United States	traditional Western
Overland Trails	Lambert Hillyer	Johnny Mack Brown, Raymond Hatton, Virginia Belmont	United States	B Western
The Paleface	Norman Z. McLeod	Bob Hope, Jane Russell	United States	comedy Western
Panhandle	Lesley Selander	Rod Cameron, Cathy Downs, Reed Hadley	United States	traditional Western
Phantom Valley	Ray Nazarro	Charles Starrett, Virginia Hunter, Smiley Burnette	United States	B Western
The Plunderers	Joseph Kane	Rod Cameron, Ilona Massey, Lorna Gray, Forrest Tucker	United States	traditional Western
Quick on the Trigger	Ray Nazarro	Charles Starrett, Lyle Talbot, Smiley Burnette, Helen Parrish	United States	B Western
Rachel and the Stranger	Norman Foster	William Holden, Robert Mitchum, Loretta Young	United States	Colonial American frontier Western
Red River	Howard Hawks	John Wayne, Montgomery Clift, Walter Brennan, Harry Carey, John Ireland	United States	cattle drive Western
Relentless	George Sherman	Robert Young, Marguerite Chapman, Willard Parker, Akim Tamiroff	United States	traditional Western
Renegades of Sonora	R.G. Springsteen	Allan "Rocky" Lane, Eddy Waller, Roy Barcroft	United States	B Western
Return of the Bad Men	Ray Enright	Randolph Scott, Robert Ryan, Anne Jeffreys	United States	traditional Western
The Sheriff of Medicine Bow	Lambert Hillyer	Johnny Mack Brown, Raymond Hatton, Max Terhune, Evelyn Finley	United States	B Western
Silent Conflict	George Archainbaud	William Boyd, Andy Clyde	United States	Hopalong Cassidy serial Western
Silver River	Raoul Walsh	Errol Flynn, Ann Sheridan, Thomas Mitchell	United States	traditional Western
Silver Trails	Christy Cabanne	Jimmy Wakely, Dub Taylor, Christine Larsen, Whip Wilson	United States	serial Western
Singin' Spurs	Ray Nazarro	Kirby Grant, Patricia Barry, Lee Patrick, Jay Silverheels, Dick Elliott, William Wilkerson	United States	Singing cowboy/musical review Western
Sinister Journey	George Archainbaud	William Boyd, Andy Clyde	United States	Hopalong Cassidy serial Western
Six-Gun Law	Ray Nazarro	Charles Starrett, Nancy Saunders, Smiley Burnette	United States	B Western
Smoky Mountain Melody	Ray Nazarro	Roy Acuff, Guinn "Big Boy" Williams, Jock Mahoney	United States	Singing cowboy/musical review Western
Song of Idaho	Ray Nazarro	The Hoosier Hot Shots, Kirby Grant, June Vincent, Tommy Ivo, Dorothy Vaughan, Emory Parnell	United States	Singing cowboy/musical review Western
Son of God's Country	R.G. Springsteen	Monte Hale, Paul Hurst, Pamela Blake	United States	B Western
Sons of Adventure	Yakima Canutt	Russell Hayden, Lynne Roberts, Gordon Jones	United States	B Western
A Southern Yankee	Edward Sedgwick	Red Skelton, Brian Donlevy, Arlene Dahl	United States	comedy Western
Station West	Sidney Lanfield	Dick Powell, Jane Greer	United States	traditional Western
Strange Gamble	George Archainbaud	William Boyd, Andy Clyde, Rand Brooks	United States	Hopalong Cassidy serial Western
The Strawberry Roan	John English	Gene Autry, Gloria Henry, Pat Buttram	United States	Singing cowboy Western
Sundown in Santa Fe	R.G. Springsteen	Allan "Rocky" Lane, Eddy Waller, Roy Barcroft	United States	B Western
Sunset Carson Rides Again	Oliver Drake	Sunset Carson, Al Terry, Bob Curtis	United States	B Western
Tex Granger	Derwin Abrahams	Robert Kellard, Peggy Stewart, Smith Ballew	United States	Midnight Rider of the Plains serial Western
Thunderhoof	Phil Karlson	Preston Foster, Mary Stuart, William Bishop	United States	traditional Western
The Timber Trail	Philip Ford	Monte Hale, James Burke, Lynne Roberts	United States	B Western
Trail of the Mounties	Howard Bretherton	Russell Hayden, Jennifer Holt, Emmett Lynn	United States	Northern Western
Trail of the Yukon	William Beaudine	Kirby Grant, Suzanne Dalbert, Bill Edwards	United States	Northern Western
Trail to Laredo	Ray Nazarro	Charles Starrett, Virginia Maxey, Smiley Burnette	United States	B Western
The Treasure of the Sierra Madre	John Huston	Humphrey Bogart, Walter Huston, Tim Holt, Bruce Bennett	United States	traditional Western
Triggerman	Howard Bretherton	Johnny Mack Brown, Raymond Hatton, Virginia Carroll	United States	B Western
Two Guys from Texas	David Butler	Dennis Morgan, Jack Carson	United States	Singing cowboy Western
Under California Stars	William Witney	Roy Rogers, Jane Frazee, Andy Devine	United States	Singing cowboy Western
The Untamed Breed	Charles Lamont	Sonny Tufts, George 'Gabby' Hayes, Barbara Britton	United States	traditional Western
The Valiant Hombre	Wallace Fox	Duncan Renaldo, Leo Carrillo, Barbara Billingsley	United States	The Cisco Kid serial Western
West of Sonora	Ray Nazarro	Charles Starrett, Anita Castle, Smiley Burnette, Steve Darrell	United States	B Western
Western Heritage	Wallace Grissell	Tim Holt, Nan Leslie, Richard Martin	United States	B Western
Whirlwind Raiders	Vernon Keays	Charles Starrett, Nancy Saunders, Smiley Burnette	United States	B Western
Whispering Smith	Leslie Fenton	Alan Ladd, Robert Preston, Brenda Marshall	United States	traditional Western
The Wolf Hunters	Budd Boetticher	Kirby Grant, Jan Clayton, Edward Norris	United States	Northern Western
Yellow Sky	William A. Wellman	Gregory Peck, Anne Baxter, Richard Widmark	United States	traditional Western
1949
Apache Chief	Frank McDonald	Russell Hayden, Alan Curtis, Tom Neal	United States	B Western
Bad Men of Tombstone	Kurt Neumann	Barry Sullivan, Marjorie Reynolds, Broderick Crawford	United States	traditional Western
Bandit King of Texas	Fred C. Brannon	Allan "Rocky" Lane, Eddy Waller, Helene Stanley	United States	B Western
Bandits of El Dorado	Ray Nazarro	Charles Starrett, Smiley Burnette, Clayton Moore	United States	B Western
The Beautiful Blonde from Bashful Bend	Preston Sturges	Betty Grable, Cesar Romero, Rudy Vallée	United States	comedy Western
The Big Cat	Phil Karlson	Lon McCallister, Peggy Ann Garner, Preston Foster, Forrest Tucker, Skip Homeier	United States	Rancher vs. Mountain Lion
Big Jack	Richard Thorpe	Wallace Beery, Richard Conte, Marjorie Main	United States	traditional Western
The Big Sombrero	Frank McDonald	Gene Autry, Elena Verdugo	United States	Singing cowboy Western
The Blazing Trail	Ray Nazarro	Charles Starrett, Marjorie Stapp, Smiley Burnette, Jock Mahoney	United States	B Western
Brimstone	Joseph Kane	Rod Cameron, Lorna Gray, Walter Brennan, Forrest Tucker	United States	traditional Western
Brothers in the Saddle	Lesley Selander	Tim Holt, Steve Brodie, Richard Martin	United States	B Western
Calamity Jane and Sam Bass	George Sherman	Yvonne De Carlo, Howard Duff, Dorothy Hart, Willard Parker, Norman Lloyd, Lloyd Bridges, Marc Lawrence, Houseley Stevenson, Milburn Stone, John Rodney, Roy Roberts, Ann Doran, Walter Baldwin	United States	biopic Western
Call of the Forest	John F. Link Sr.	Robert Lowery, Ken Curtis, Chief Thundercloud	United States	B Western
Canadian Pacific	Edwin L. Marin	Randolph Scott, Jane Wyatt, J. Carrol Naish, Victor Jory, Nancy Olson, Robert Barrat,Walter Sande, Grandon Rhodes, Don Haggerty, John Parrish, Mary Kent, John Hamilton,Dick Wessel	United States	empire building Western
Challenge of the Range	Ray Nazarro	Charles Starrett, Paula Raymond, Smiley Burnette	United States	B Western
Colorado Territory	Raoul Walsh	Joel McCrea, Virginia Mayo, Dorothy Malone, Henry Hull, John Archer, James Mitchell, Morris Ankrum, Basil Ruysdael, Frank Puglia, Ian Wolfe, Harry Woods, Houseley Stevenson, Maudie Prickett	United States	traditional Western
The Cowboy and the Indians	John English	Gene Autry, Sheila Ryan, Frank Richards	United States	Singing cowboy Western
Cowboy and the Prizefighter	Lewis D. Collins	Jim Bannon, Don Reynolds, Emmett Lynn	United States	Red Ryder serial Western
Crashing Thru	Ray Taylor	Whip Wilson, Andy Clyde, Christine Larsen	United States	Whip Wilson serial Western
The Daring Caballero	Wallace Fox	Duncan Renaldo, Leo Carrillo, Kippee Valez	United States	The Cisco Kid serial Western
Death Valley Gunfighter	R.G. Springsteen	Allan "Rocky" Lane, Eddy Waller, Gail Davis	United States	B Western
Deputy Marshal	William Berke	Russell Hayden, Frances Langford, Dick Foran	United States	B Western
Desert Vigilante	Fred F. Sears	Charles Starrett, Peggy Stewart, Smiley Burnette	United States	B Western
Diamond City	David MacDonald	David Farrar, Honor Blackman, Diana Dors	United Kingdom	South African Western
The Doolins of Oklahoma	Gordon Douglas	Randolph Scott, George Macready, Louise Allbritton, John Ireland, Virginia Huston, Charles Kemper, Noah Beery Jr., Dona Drake, Robert Barrat, Lee Patrick, Griff Barnett, Frank Fenton, Jock O'Mahoney	United States	traditional Western
Down Dakota Way	William Witney	Roy Rogers, Dale Evans	United States	Singing cowboy Western
Dude Cowboy	David Howard	Tim Holt, Marjorie Reynolds, Ray Whitley, Lee "Lasses" White	United States	serial Western
Feudin' Rhythm	Edward Bernds	Eddy Arnold, Gloria Henry, Kirby Grant, Isabel Randolph, Tommy Ivo, Fuzzy Knight, Carolina Cotton	United States	Singing cowboy/musical review Western
The Fighting Kentuckian	George Waggner	John Wayne, Vera Ralston, Philip Dorn, Oliver Hardy	United States	post-colonial (1818) American frontier
Fighting Man of the Plains	Edwin L. Marin	Randolph Scott, Bill Williams, Victor Jory, Jane Nigh, Douglas Kennedy, Joan Taylor, James Todd, Rhys Williams, Barry Kelley, Berry Kroeger, Paul Fix, James Millican, Dale Robertson, Burk Symon, Herbert Rawlinson, J. Farrell MacDonald, Harry Cheshire, James Griffith	United States	traditional Western
The Fighting Redhead	Lewis D. Collins	Jim Bannon, Don Reynolds Emmett Lynn	United States	Red Ryder serial Western
Frontier Investigator	Fred C. Brannon	Allan "Rocky" Lane, Eddy Waller, Roy Barcroft	United States	B Western
The Gal Who Took the West	Frederick de Cordova	Yvonne De Carlo, Charles Coburn, Scott Brady, John Russell, Myrna Dell, James Millican, Clem Bevans, Bob Stevenson, Houseley Stevenson, Robin Short, Russell Simpson,John Litel, James Todd, Edward Earle	United States	Technicolor Western with songs and comedy
The Gay Amigo	Wallace Fox	Duncan Renaldo, Leo Carrillo	United States	Cisco Kid serial Western
Ghost of Zorro	Fred C. Brannon	Clayton Moore, Pamela Blake, Roy Barcroft	United States	B Western
The Golden Stallion	William Witney	Roy Rogers, Dale Evans, Estelita Rodriguez	United States	Singing cowboy Western
Haunted Trails	Lambert Hillyer	Whip Wilson, Andy Clyde, Reno Browne	United States	Whip Wilson serial Western
Hellfire	R.G. Springsteen	William Elliott, Marie Windsor, Forrest Tucker, Jim Davis, H. B. Warner, Paul Fix, Grant Withers, Emory Parnell, Esther Howard, Jody Gilbert, Louis R. Faust, Harry Woods, Denver Pyle, Trevor Bardette, Dewey Robinson, Paula Hill	United States	traditional Western
Home in San Antone	Ray Nazarro	Roy Acuff, The Smoky Mountain Boys, The Modernaires, Doye O'Dell, Lyn Thomas, Bill Edwards	United States	Singing cowboy/musical review Western
Horsemen of the Sierras	Fred F. Sears	Charles Starrett, Jason Robards Sr., Smiley Burnette	United States	B Western
I Shot Jesse James	Samuel Fuller	Reed Hadley, John Ireland, Barbara Britton	United States	outlaw Western
The James Brothers of Missouri	Fred C. Brannon	Keith Richards, Robert Bice, Noel Neill	United States	serial Western
Kazan	Will Jason	Stephen Dunne, Lois Maxwell, Joe Sawyer	United States	B Western
Laramie	Ray Nazarro	Charles Starrett, Fred F. Sears, Smiley Burnette	United States	B Western
The Last Bandit	Joseph Kane	Wild Bill Elliott, Lorna Gray, Andy Devine, Jack Holt	United States	traditional Western
Law of the Barbary Coast	Lew Landers	Gloria Henry, Stephen Dunne, Adeele Jergens, Robert Shayne, Stefan Schnabel	United States	B Western
Law of the Golden West	Philip Ford	Monte Hale, Paul Hurst, Gail Davis	United States	serial Western
Law of the West	Ray Taylor	Johnny Mack Brown, Max Terhune, Bill Kennedy	United States	B Western
Lust for Gold	S. Sylvan Simon	Glenn Ford, Ida Lupino, Gig Young	United States	traditional Western
Masked Raiders	Lesley Selander	Tim Holt, Richard Martin, Marjorie Lord	United States	B Western
The Mysterious Desperado	Lesley Selander	Tim Holt, Richard Martin, Edward Norris	United States	B Western
Navajo Trail Riders	R.G. Springsteen	Allan "Rocky" Lane, Eddy Waller, Robert Emmett Keane	United States	B Western
Outcasts of the Trail	Philip Ford	Monte Hale, Paul Hurst, Jeff Donnell	United States	serial Western
Outlaw Country	Ray Taylor	Lash LaRue, Al St. John, Dan White	United States	Lash LaRue serial Western
Pioneer Marshal	Philip Ford	Monte Hale, Paul Hurst, Nan Leslie	United States	serial Western
Powder River Rustlers	Philip Ford	Allan "Rocky" Lane, Eddy Waller, Gerry Ganzer	United States	B Western
Prince of the Plains	Philip Ford	Monte Hale, Paul Hurst, Shirley Davis	United States	serial Western
Range Justice	Ray Taylor	Johnny Mack Brown, Max Terhune, Tristram Coffin	United States	B Western
Range Land	Lambert Hillyer	Whip Wilson, Andy Clyde, Reno Browne	United States	Whip Wilson serial Western
Ranger of Cherokee Strip	Philip Ford	Monte Hale, Paul Hurst, Alix Talton	United States	serial Western
Red Canyon	George Sherman	Ann Blyth, Howard Duff, George Brent	United States	family Western
The Red Pony	Lewis Milestone	Myrna Loy, Robert Mitchum, Peter Miles	United States	family Western
Red Stallion in the Rockies	Ralph Murphy	Arthur Franz, Jean Heather, Jim Davis	United States	family Western
Renegades of the Sage	Ray Nazarro	Charles Starrett, Leslie Banning, Smiley Burnette, Jock Mahoney	United States	B Western
Ride, Ryder, Ride	Lewis D. Collins	Jim Bannon, Don Reynolds, Emmett Lynn	United States	Red Ryder serial Western
Riders in the Sky	John English	Gene Autry, Gloria Henry, Pat Buttram	United States	Singing cowboy Western
Riders of the Dusk	Lambert Hillyer	Whip Wilson, Andy Clyde, Reno Browne	United States	Whip Wilson serial Western
Riders of the Pony Express	Michael Salle	Ken Curtis, Shug Fisher, Cathy Douglas	United States	B Western
Riders of the Range	Lesley Selander	Tim Holt, Richard Martin, Jacqueline White, Reed Hadley	United States	B Western
Riders of the Whistling Pines	John English	Gene Autry, Patricia Barry, Clayton Moore	United States	Singing cowboy Western
Rim of the Canyon	John English	Gene Autry, Alan Hale Jr., Thurston Hall, Jock Mahoney, Denver Pyle	United States	Singing cowboy Western
Rimfire	B. Reeves Eason	James Millican, Mary Beth Hughes, Reed Hadley, Henry Hull, Victor Kilian, Fuzzy Knight, Chris-Pin Martin, George Cleveland, Margia Dean, Ray Bennett, Glenn Strange, John Cason, Jason Robards, Sr., I. Stanford Jolley, Ben Erway	United States	noir Western
Rio Grande	Norman Sheldon	Sunset Carson, Evohn Keyes, Lee Morgan	United States	Sunset Carson serial Western
Roll, Thunder, Roll	Lewis D. Collins	Jim Bannon, Don Reynolds, Emmett Lynn	United States	Red Ryder serial Western
Roughshod	Mark Robson	Gloria Grahame, Robert Sterling, John Ireland	United States	outlaw Western
Rustlers	Lesley Selander	Tim Holt, Richard Martin, Martha Hyer	United States	B Western
San Antone Ambush	Philip Ford	Monte Hale, Paul Hurst, Bette Daniels	United States	serial Western
Sand	Louis King	Mark Stevens, Coleen Gray,	United States	traditional Western
Satan's Cradle	Ford Beebe	Duncan Renaldo, Leo Carrillo, Ann Savage	United States	The Cisco Kid serial Western
Shadows of the West	Ray Taylor	Whip Wilson, Andy Clyde, Riley Hill	United States	Whip Wilson serial Western
She Wore a Yellow Ribbon	John Ford	John Wayne, Joanne Dru, John Agar, Ben Johnson,Harry Carey Jr., Victor McLaglen, Mildred Natwick, George O'Brien, Arthur Shields, Michael Dugan, Chief John Big Tree, Fred Graham, George Sky Eagle,Tom Tyler, Noble Johnson	United States	cavalry Western
Sheriff of Wichita	R.G. Springsteen	Allan "Rocky" Lane, Eddy Waller, Roy Barcroft	United States	B Western
Son of a Badman	Ray Taylor	Lash LaRue, Al St. John, Noel Neill	United States	Lash LaRue serial Western
Son of Billy the Kid	Ray Taylor	Lash LaRue, Al St. John, June Carr	United States	Lash LaRue serial Western
Sons of New Mexico	John English	Gene Autry, Gail Davis, Clayton Moore	United States	Singing cowboy Western
South of Death Valley	Ray Nazarro	Charles Starrett, Gail Davis, Fred F. Sears, Lee Roberts	United States	B Western
South of Rio	Philip Ford	Monte Hale, Kay Christopher, Paul Hurst	United States	serial Western
South of St. Louis	Ray Enright	Joel McCrea, Alexis Smith, Zachary Scott, Douglas Kennedy, Alan Hale, Victor Jory, Bob Steele, Art Smith, Russell Hicks, Jack Mower,Forrest Taylor	United States	traditional Western
Stagecoach Kid	Lew Landers	Tim Holt, Richard Martin, Jeff Donnell	United States	B Western
Stallion Canyon	Harry L. Fraser	Ken Curtis, Shug Fisher, Carolina Cotton	United States	B Western
Stampede	Lesley Selander	Rod Cameron, Gale Storm, Johnny Mack Brown	United States	ranchers vs. settlers Western
Streets of Laredo	Leslie Fenton	William Holden, Mona Freeman, Macdonald Carey, Mona Freeman, William Bendix, Stanley Ridges, Alfonso Bedoya, Ray Teal, Clem Bevans, James Bell, Grandon Rhodes	United States	outlaw Western
Susanna Pass	William Witney	Roy Rogers, Dale Evans, Estelita Rodriguez	United States	Singing cowboy Western
Trail of the Yukon	William Beaudine	Kirby Grant, Suzanne Dalbert, Bill Edwards, Iris Adrian	United States	Canadian mountie serial Western
Trails End	Lambert Hillyer	Johnny Mack Brown, Raymond Hatton, Max Terhune, Kay Morley	United States	B Western
Trouble at Melody Mesa	W. Merle Connell	Brad King, Cal Shrum, Lorraine Miller	United States	B Western
The Walking Hills	John Sturges	Randolph Scott, Ella Raines, William Bishop, Edgar Buchanan, Arthur Kennedy, John Ireland, Jerome Courtland, Russell Collins, Josh White, Charles Stevens	United States	traditional Western
West of El Dorado	Ray Taylor	Johnny Mack Brown, Max Terhune, Reno Browne	United States	B Western
Western Renegades	Wallace Fox	Johnny Mack Brown, Max Terhune, Jane Adams	United States	B Western
The Wyoming Bandit	Philip Ford	Allan "Rocky" Lane, Eddy Waller, Trevor Bardette	United States	B Western

== TV series ==
see, List of TV Westerns
