= The Medico of Painted Springs =

1941 film by Lambert Hillyer

- Theatrical release poster
- Directed by: Lambert Hillyer
- Screenplay by: Wyndham Gittens; Winston Miller
- Based on: The Medico of Painted Springs by James Lyon Rubel
- Produced by: Jack Fier
- Starring: Charles Starrett; Terry Walker; Ben Taggart; Wheeler Oakman; The Simp-Phonies
- Cinematography: Benjamin Kline
- Edited by: Mel Thorsen
- Production company: Columbia Pictures
- Distributed by: Columbia Pictures
- Release date: June 26, 1941
- Running time: 58 minutes
- Country: United States
- Language: English

The Medico of Painted Springs (also known as Doctor's Alibi) is a 1941 American Western film produced by Columbia Pictures. Based on the novel of the same name by James Lyon Rubel, the film stars Charles Starrett, Terry Walker, Ben Taggart, Wheeler Oakman, and the Simp-Phonies in a cameo appearance. It was directed by Lambert Hillyer and written by Wyndham Gittens and Winston Miller. In the film, Starrett's character, Dr. Steven Monroe, travels to a tumultuous Painted Springs and attempts to resolve a raging conflict between two camps – the cattlemen and the sheep ranchers.

The film received mixed reviews from contemporary film critics. After the release of the film in June 1941, Columbia allowed the release of two more Medico films, Thunder Over the Prairie (July 1941) and Prairie Stranger (September 1941). Starrett, who went on to star in around sixty other western flicks, found The Medico of Painted Springs to be his favorite film. The film has many noticeable differences from Rubel's original work.

== Plot ==
Upon arriving at Painted Springs, Dr. Steven Monroe witnesses a clash between sheep herders and cattle breeders. As Monroe starts to investigate the cause of the conflict, he finds out about Fred Burns' diabolical scheme – he intends to steal John Richards' cattle and frame sheep rancher Ed Gordon for the deed. After a series of fights, during which Burns and his men kidnap Richards' daughter Nancy, Monroe rescues Nancy and manages to get Burns to confess. With his evil intentions revealed, the two camps cease battling, and Monroe quietly leaves Painted Springs.

== Cast ==
- Charles Starrett as Dr. Steven Monroe
- Terry Walker as Nancy Richards
- Ben Taggart as John Richards
- Ray Bennett as Ed Gordon
- Wheeler Oakman as Fred Burns
- Richard Fiske as Kentucky Lane
- Edmund Cobb as Sheriff
- Edythe Elliott as Maw Blaine
- Bud Osborne as Karns
- Steve Clark as Ellis
- Chuck Hamilton as Pete
- Lloyd Bridges as Henchman (uncredited)
- The Simp-Phonies as Musical Ensemble

== Production ==
Charles Starrett, who had previously appeared in the 1940 Western film The Durango Kid, was cast as Dr. Steven Monroe. Terry Walker was chosen to play Nancy Richards, and Ben Taggart portrayed John Richards. Ray Bennett was announced to play Ed Gordon. Wheeler Oakman was cast as Fred Burns. The Simp-Phonies made a cameo appearance in the film. Then-novice actor Lloyd Bridges, who joined Columbia Pictures in 1941, also had a brief and uncredited role in the film. It marked one of the earliest films he made an appearance in.

Lambert Hillyer directed the film. Winston Miller and Wyndham Gittens wrote the screenplay based on James Lyon Rubel's 1934 novel The Medico of Painted Springs. Jack Fier was in charge of production for Columbia Pictures. Benjamin Kline served as cinematographer, while Mel Thorsen edited the film. Filming began on May 5, 1941, and ended on May 14, 1941.

All of the songs in The Medico of Painted Springs were sung by the Simp-Phonies. There were a total of four distinct songs in the film, namely "Corny Troubles", "We'd Just as Soon Fiddle as Fight", "Lonely Rangeland", and "Rocking and Rolling in the Saddle".

== Release and reception ==
The film premiered at the Lido Theater, a cinema in Newport Beach, California. It was released in the United States in June 1941. Up till at least January 1942, screenings of the film were still available at cinemas. It was re-screened in September 1957 at the Apollo Theatre. It received mixed reviews from contemporary film critics. A reviewer for Variety wrote, "Saddled with sophomoric episodes and dialog, The Medico of Painted Springs will find a groove for Saturday matinees, where the kids will stand for anything as long as it's western."

In an entry for the film in his book The Western film Encyclopedia, Phil Hardy commented that "[t]he picture's main failing is Miller and Gittens' dialogue which has Starrett oscillate between a brash cowboy and a wild-mannered medico."

Michael R. Pitts, in his book Western Movies, found the film to be "[a] pretty good actioner in Charles Starrett's Columbia series." Towards the end of his film career spanning sixty-odd western flicks, Starrett commented that his best films were from the 1940s, and that his favorite one was The Medico of Painted Springs.

== Differences between the film and the novel ==
The film has a handful of differences from Rubel's original work. Many character names were changed for the film, including Cliff Monroe to Steven Monroe, Puff Gordon to Ed Gordon, and Nancy Starweather to Nancy Richards. Additionally, the majority of the characters in the film were nameless in the book. The ending was also tweaked. In the novel, Monroe professes his love for Nancy Starweather and they happily marry in Painted Springs. In the film, this does not happen, and Monroe just leaves the area.

== Sequels ==
The film marked the first entry of the Medico film series by Columbia Pictures. The following two films in the series were Thunder Over the Prairie (July 1941) and Prairie Stranger (September 1941). However, they were not based on Rubel's works. More sequels to The Medico of Painted Springs were planned for production, but were never greenlit after the dismal box office performance of the two released sequels. All three films had Charles Starrett playing the role of Dr. Steven Monroe.

== See also ==
- List of Columbia Pictures films
- List of Western films of the 1940s

== Bibliography ==
- Western Film Collector. Western Film Collectors. 1973.
- Danny Peary (November 1991). Cult movie stars. Simon & Schuster. ISBN 978-0-671-74924-8.
- Tom Weaver (2003). Double Feature Creature Attack: A Monster Merger of Two More Volumes of Classic Interviews. McFarland. ISBN 978-0-7864-8215-3.
- John Reid (October 1, 2004). Westerns for a Rainy Saturday. Lulu.com. ISBN 978-1-4116-1431-4.
- Michael R. Pitts (January 20, 2009). Western film series of the sound era. McFarland. ISBN 978-0-7864-3529-6.
- Gene Blottner (2012). Columbia Pictures Movie Series, 1926–1955: The Harry Cohn Years. McFarland. ISBN 978-0-7864-3353-7.
