= Cheyenne Wildcat =

1944 film

- Directed by: Lesley Selander
- Written by: Randall Faye
- Based on: Red Ryder comic strip by Fred Harman
- Produced by: Louis Gray
- Starring: Wild Bill Elliott
- Cinematography: Bud Thackery
- Edited by: Charles Craft
- Music by: Joseph Dubin
- Distributed by: Republic Pictures
- Release date: September 30, 1944 (United States)
- Running time: 56 minutes
- Country: United States
- Language: English

Cheyenne Wildcat is a 1944 American Western film directed by Lesley Selander and one of the 23 Republic Pictures Red Ryder features. The film, starring veteran western actor, Wild Bill Elliott as Red Ryder, was based on the comic strip "Red Ryder" created by Fred Harman (1938–1964), and licensed through a special arrangement with Stephen Slesinger. Costarring as Little Beaver, was actor Robert Blake.

== Plot ==
The president of Blue Springs Bank, Jason Hopkins, seeks to entrap his cashier, Harrison Colby, whom he suspects is exchanging the bank's gold certificates with fake ones. Colby is caught and confesses but also incriminates his partner, Dandy Joe Meeker. The worried Colby consults Meeker, who engages a gunslinger to kill Hopkins and then to pin the murder on Jim Douglas. Douglas, soon to be paroled from prison, had formally been arrested and convicted for a similar crime that he hadn't committed. Hopkins meets Douglas in order to tell him the truth regarding his imprisonment but is killed by the gunman. Douglas is subsequently jailed for the murder. However, the gunman is captured by Red Ryder and his Indian ward, Little Beaver.

Douglas is hesitant to explain his situation for fear that his daughter, Betty Lou Hopkins will discover that he, not Jason Hopkins, is her real father. The now jailed gunman is stabbed in the back and the sheriff, convinced that the gunman was killed to silence him, frees Douglas. He is hired by Colby as a bank guard, where he uses the name Johnson in order that he can see his daughter every day.

Meeker has Colby steal the forged certificates before they are discovered as fake and then claim that Hopkins embezzled the originals. To cover the losses, Betty Lou decides to invest her inheritance in the bank. Red Ryder and his Aunt, the Duchess contribute as well. But, still wanting to take over the bank, Meeker instigates a run on the bank, which he hopes will close it down. Thanks to Red and Little Beaver, Meeker's plan is foiled and the bank remains solvent.

The bank receives a shipment of money which Meeker's gang steals. Betty Lou, seeing only part of the robbery, mistakenly assumes that Douglas was in on the heist, although in reality, he was forced at gunpoint to accompany the fleeing criminals. Suspicious of Colby's insistence that only Meeker can help them now, Red, however, decides to investigate, and near the open vault, he discovers a pocket watch, inscribed "to Jim Douglas from Jason Hopkins." The watch contains a picture of Betty Lou's mother, leading Red to deduce Douglas' real identity and his relationship to Betty Lou.

Red plants newspaper stories that Betty Lou was seriously injured in the robbery. This lures Douglas back to Blue Springs, but in the meantime, Meeker pressures a bank commissioner to take control of the bank. Red's newspaper ploy works, and Douglas admits to him that he is Betty Lou's father, but insists that he is innocent of any wrongdoing. Red continues to gather evidence proving that Douglas was framed for the robbery, and then informs Betty Lou that Douglas is her real father. The delighted Betty Lou has Douglas released from jail, but Meeker tries to organize a lynch mob by telling the townspeople that he will not invest in the bank if Douglas is freed. However, Red' Ryder's evidence proves Meeker's guilt. Now caught, Colby and Meeker take the Duchess hostage in an attempt to escape. Red fights with Meeker, who is killed with his own knife after he tries to stab Red. After the rest of the gang is rounded up, Betty Lou hosts a party to celebrate the re-opening of the bank, which they intend to run together.

== Cast ==
- Wild Bill Elliott as Red Ryder
- Robert Blake as Little Beaver (as Bobby Blake)
- Alice Fleming as The Duchess
- Peggy Stewart as Betty Lou Hopkins
- Francis McDonald as Jim Douglas
- Roy Barcroft as Dandy Joe Meeker
- Tom London as Harrison Colby
- Tom Chatterton as Jason Hopkins
- Kenne Duncan as Henchman Pete
- Bud Geary as Henchman Chuck
- Jack Kirk as Sheriff Brown
- Sam Burton as Bank Teller
- Rudy Bowman as Townsman (uncredited)
- Bob Burns as Stage Guard Clem (uncredited)
- Horace B. Carpenter as Townsman (uncredited)
- Steve Clark as Station Agent Joe (uncredited)
- Wade Crosby as Henchman (uncredited)
- Tex Driscoll as Townsman (uncredited)
- Frank Ellis as Deputy (uncredited)
- Franklyn Farnum as Evans - Lynch Mob Member (uncredited)
- Neal Hart as Townsman (uncredited)
- Fred Howard as Townsman (uncredited)
- Rex Lease as Lyncher (uncredited)
- Charles Morton as Bushwhacker (uncredited)
- Merlyn Nelson as Townsman (uncredited)
- Jack O'Shea as Bank Customer (uncredited)
- Bud Osborne as Henchman Dusty (uncredited)
- Tom Smith as Lynch Mob Member (uncredited)
- Charles Soldani as Lynch Mob Member (uncredited)
- Tom Steele as Sniper (uncredited)
- Forrest Taylor as Doctor (uncredited)
- Jack Tornek as Lynch Mob Member (uncredited)
- Lucille Ward as Townswoman (uncredited)
- Robert J. Wilke as Deputy Charlie (uncredited)

=== Stunts ===
- Bud Geary
- Fred Graham
- Tom Steele

== See also ==
- List of American Western films of the 1940s, especially from 1944
