= Take Me Back to Oklahoma =

1940 film

- Directed by: Albert Herman
- Written by: Robert Emmett Tansey (screenplay)
- Produced by: Edward Finney
- Starring: Tex Ritter; Karl Hackett; Bob Wills
- Cinematography: Marcel Le Picard
- Edited by: Frederick Bain
- Production company: Edward F. Finney Productions
- Distributed by: Monogram Pictures
- Release date: November 11, 1940
- Running time: 57 minutes
- Country: United States
- Language: English

Take Me Back to Oklahoma is a 1940 American Western film directed by Albert Herman and starring Tex Ritter, Karl Hackett and Bob Wills.

== Plot ==
Tex and his sidekick Slim ride into the town of Peeko to help out Tex's old friend, Ace Hutchinson, the foreman of the Peeko Stage Line. The stage line, owned by Jane Winters, is being sabotaged by Storm and his gang, who are plotting to take over the line for themselves. Because a race of the coaches will determine who will be awarded the stage franchise, Storm determines to eliminate Tex and orders his gang to steal $2,000 raised at a church benefit and plant it in Tex's saddlebags. In case the law fails to remove Tex, Storm then hires Mule Bates to kill him. Unknown to Storm, however, Tex has befriended Bates's little son, and so Bates informs Tex of Storm's plot. Tex and Bates stage a duel for Storm's benefit, but Storm double-crosses Bates and shoots him. On the day of the race, Tex takes the coach reins from Ace, fends off Storm's treachery and wins the franchise for Jane. At the finish line, Storm is arrested on Bates's testimony, and Tex is exonerated of all charges.

== Cast ==
- Tex Ritter as Tex Lawton
- Bob Wills as Himself, leader Texas Playboys
- Slim Andrews as Slim Hunkapillar
- Terry Walker as Jane Winters
- Robert McKenzie as Deacon Ames
- Karl Hackett as Storm
- Donald Curtis as Henchman Snapper
- Gene Alsace as Henchman Red
- Olin Francis as Mule Bates
- Carleton Young as Ace Hutchinson
- George Eldredge as Sheriff
- Johnny Lee Wills as Texas Playboy
- Leon McAuliffe as Texas Playboy
- Son Caz Lansford as Texas Playboy
- Wayne Johnson as Texas Playboy
- Eldon Shamblin as Texas Playboy
- White Flash as Tex's Horse

== Production ==
=== Music ===
Music for the film was done by Bob Willis along with part of the Texas Playboys. His 1940 trip to Hollywood for the film introduced his music to the West Coast. The film worked Willis and the Playboys into the cast as part of the film. Most of the band remained in Tulsa as the contract was for a small string band, but he returned to Hollywood in 1941 with the entire band to film Go West, Young Lady.

== Reception ==
In his book Back in the Saddle, film critic Gary Yoggy noted that Take Me Back to Oklahoma was one of Tex Ritter's best films.

== Soundtrack ==
- "Village Blacksmith" (by Lew Porter and Johnny Lange)
- "Kalamity Kate" (by Lew Porter and Johnny Lange)
- "You Are My Sunshine" (by Jimmie Davis with Charles Mitchell's Orchestra)
- "Good Old Oklahoma" (by Bob Wills)
- "Take Me Back To Tulsa" (by Bob Wills)
- "Going Indian" (by Bob Wills)
- "Lone Star Rag" (by Bob Wills)
- "Bob Wills Special" (by Bob Wills)
