= Thunder Over the Prairie =

1941 film by Lambert Hillyer

- Theatrical release poster
- Directed by: Lambert Hillyer
- Screenplay by: Betty Burbridge
- Based on: The Medico Rides by James L. Rubel
- Produced by: William Berke
- Starring: Charles Starrett; Cliff Edwards; Eileen O'Hearn; Stanley Brown; Danny Mummert; David Sharpe
- Cinematography: Benjamin H. Kline
- Edited by: Burton Kramer
- Music by: Morris Stoloff
- Production company: Columbia Pictures
- Distributed by: Columbia Pictures
- Release date: July 30, 1941
- Running time: 60 minutes
- Country: United States
- Language: English

Thunder Over the Prairie is a 1941 American Western film directed by Lambert Hillyer and written by Betty Burbridge. It is based on the 1935 novel The Medico Rides by James L. Rubel. The film stars Charles Starrett, Cliff Edwards, Eileen O'Hearn, Stanley Brown, Danny Mummert and David Sharpe. The film was released on July 30, 1941, by Columbia Pictures. It is a sequel to The Medico of Painted Springs, released a month earlier. The third "Medico" film, Prairie Stranger, debuted in September.

== Cast ==
- Charles Starrett as Dr. Steven Monroe
- Cliff Edwards as 'Bones' Malloy
- Eileen O'Hearn as Nora Mandan
- Stanley Brown as Roy Mandan
- Danny Mummert as Timmy Wheeler
- David Sharpe as Clay Mandan
- Ray Bennett as 'Ace' Hartley
- Joe McGuinn as Hartley
- Donald Curtis as Taylor
- Ted Adams as Dave Wheeler
- Jack Rockwell as Henry Clayton
- Budd Buster as Judge Merriwether
- Horace B. Carpenter as Bailiff
- Cal Shrum as Band Leader

== Bibliography ==
- Fetrow, Alan G. Feature Films, 1940-1949: a United States Filmography. McFarland, 1994.
