= Prairie Stranger =

1941 film by Lambert Hillyer

- Theatrical release poster
- Directed by: Lambert Hillyer
- Screenplay by: Winston Miller
- Based on: The Medico Rides the Trail by James L. Rubel
- Produced by: William Berke
- Starring: Charles Starrett; Cliff Edwards; Patti McCarty; Forbes Murray; Frank LaRue; Archie R. Twitchell
- Cinematography: Benjamin H. Kline
- Edited by: James Sweeney
- Production company: Columbia Pictures
- Distributed by: Columbia Pictures
- Release date: September 18, 1941
- Running time: 58 minutes
- Country: United States
- Language: English

Prairie Stranger is a 1941 American Western film directed by Lambert Hillyer and written by Winston Miller. It is based on the 1936 novel The Medico Rides the Trail by James L. Rubel. The film stars Charles Starrett, Cliff Edwards, Patti McCarty, Forbes Murray, Frank LaRue and Archie R. Twitchell. The film was released on September 18, 1941, by Columbia Pictures. The film is the third in the "Medico" series, which includes The Medico of Painted Springs and Thunder Over the Prairie, released earlier that year.

== Cast ==
- Charles Starrett as Steven Monroe
- Cliff Edwards as 'Bones' Mallory
- Patti McCarty as Sue Evans
- Forbes Murray as Jud Evans
- Frank LaRue as Jim Dawson
- Archie R. Twitchell as Barton
- Francis Walker as Craig
- Edmund Cobb as Dr. Westridge
- Jim Corey as Undertaker
- Russ Powell as Whittling Jones
- Lew Preston as Lew Preston
- Lopez Willingham as Ranch Hand
