= Slim Andrews =

American musician (1931–2022)

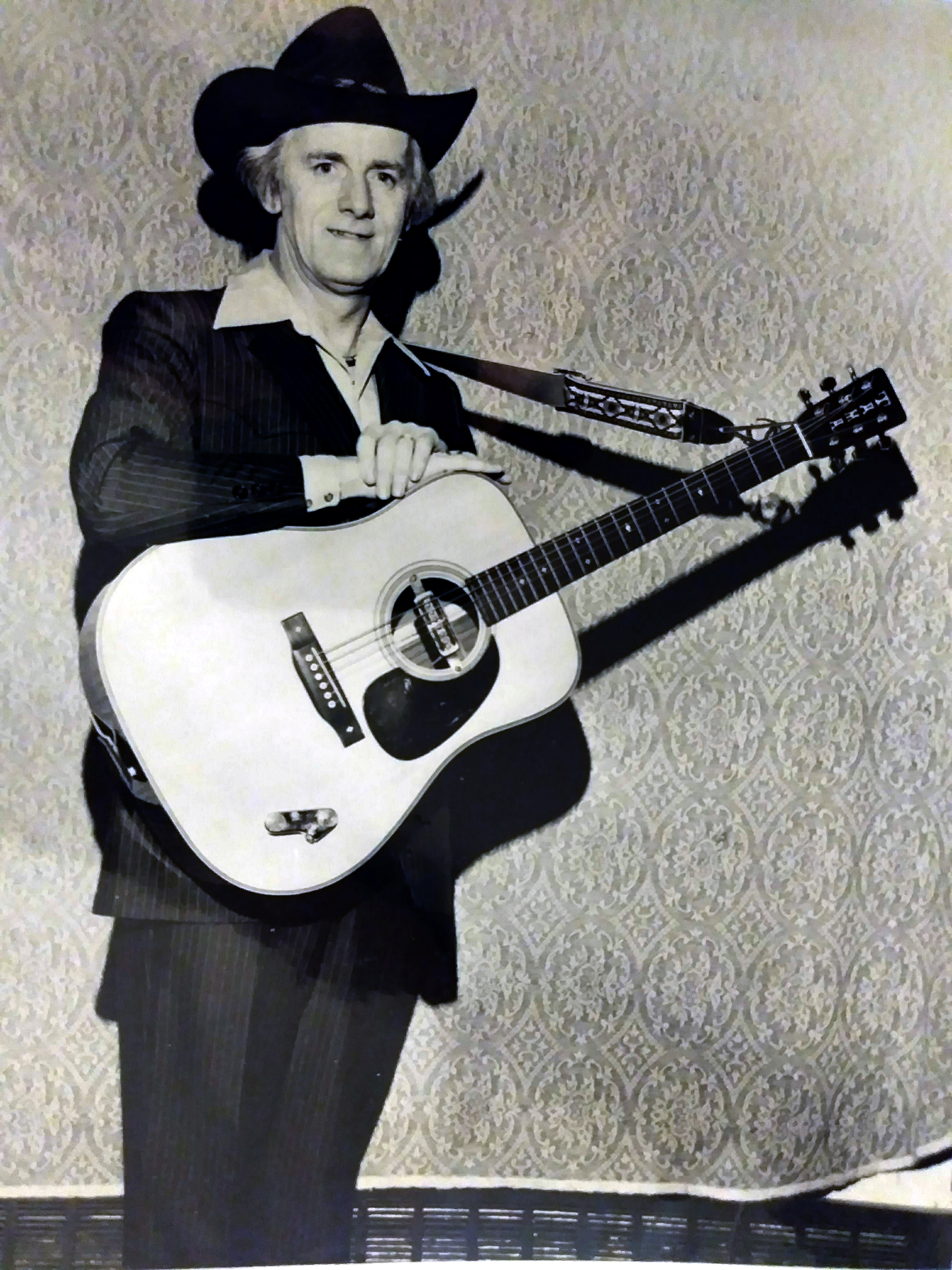

Background information
- Born: Leonard Andrews Huntington, Jr. June 14, 1931; Roxbury, Boston, Massachusetts, United States
- Died: January 15, 2022 (aged 90)
- Genres: Country
- Occupations: Booking agent, Television presenter, Vocalist, Musician
- Instruments: Vocals, guitar
- Years active: 1942-2017

Slim Andrews (born Leonard Andrews Huntington, Jr., June 14, 1931 - January 15, 2022) was an American country music artist with seven decades of performing at the local and regional levels. He began his music career in 1942 at the age of eleven when he won a talent contest at the Community Theater in New Auburn, ME. He got his first guitar at this time and spent 75 years of his life entertaining throughout the South and Northeast.

== Early years and military service ==
When Andrews was six months old, his family moved to Auburn, ME, and he remained there until his mother died. In 1946, he then moved back to Dorchester, MA. After graduating from high school in 1948, Andrews joined the U.S. Army and spent three years and three months in Germany where, in addition to his military service which included participating in the Berlin Airlift during the Blockade, he entertained the troops periodically on special assignments. After his honorable discharge from the Army, Andrews married his high school sweetheart, fathered five sons and one daughter, and moved forward with his career as a country music performer with several groups in the southeastern Massachusetts area. One of his first gigs was in 1954 at "Nick's Place" on Nantasket beach in Hull, MA. From 1952 to 1954, Andrews played at several churches with his friend and "button" accordionist, Victor Jenkins.

== Career growth ==
In 1958 Andrews formed the Berkshire Mountain Boys based in Brockton, MA. After 13 years there, he returned to Maine in 1971 and formed the Cumberland Valley Boys. In 1976 Andrews established the State of Maine Country Music Awards Show with Gini Eaton of the Single Spur in Windham, ME. Together they started the Slim Andrews Enterprises Booking Agency. After the divorce from Andrews' first wife, Pearl, Andrews married Gini in 1979 and they continued to run the Single Spur and the booking agency together. The booking agency brought many Nashville acts to venues throughout New England and upstate New York, including clubs, fairs, and TV and radio shows. Some of the well known acts that Andrews booked during this period included Nat Stuckey, Grandpa Jones, Johnny Russell, Lee Golden of the Oak Ridge Boys, and Barbara Fairchild. It was also during this time that Andrews put together an annual State of Maine Country Music All Star Review of Top Maine Talent that included other New England award-winning performers. In 1980, Andrews was cited by the Maine Sunday Telegram as one of the most influential drivers of country music in Maine, along with two other Maine country music pioneers, Dick Curless and Al Hawkes. In the 1980s Single Spur was reinvented and reintroduced as the Silver Spur, a full-service restaurant, bar and club. In 1977, Slim and Gini, along with Barry Deane, founded the Maine Country Music Association with Slim becoming the acting president until regular officers were elected in July of that year.

In early 1979, Andrews approached Windham's representative to the state legislature, William Diamond, and asked him to sponsor a bill that would exempt club owners from having to pay an unemployment tax for part-time musicians that the musicians would never be able to collect. Andrews' efforts in this matter paid off when the governor of Maine, Joseph E. Brennan, signed into law on April 13 legislation that ended this practice.

On February 4, 1980, on Maine's NBC affiliate WCSH 6, Maine country music made its debut on the Tangents show hosted by Lew Colby. The Tangents show ran on Sundays at 11:15 p.m. In the fall of 1980, Andrews and Bud Bailey helped to produce a one-hour show consisting of performances by the top four country bands appearing in Maine at the time. This show has been archived and is now available digitally.

In 1985 the responsibilities of Andrews' "day job" required that Andrews and Gini and their children move to Kalamazoo, Michigan, where they stayed until 1990. Andrewswent to Kalamazoo to open a general agency there through contacts he made as Director of Agencies for Texas-based American Income Life in Portland, ME (Day job hat). In a partnership with Harvey and Myrna Knapp, Andrews was able to build a general agency in the Senior Insurance Market of Medicare Supplemental and Long Term Care Insurance. During this time in Kalamazoo, Slim's wife, Gini, contracted breast cancer and the move to a warmer climate in Savannah, Georgia in 1990 was made for Gini's sake. Savannah was chosen as their home for the next ten years because Gini loved it, and the demographics for senior citizens was ideal for Slim's continued service to the senior insurance market. While living in Michigan, Andrews continued to appear with various country groups as a single entertainer, quite frequently with an old friend from Maine, Dale Bennett. They, in fact, performed for the Executive Board of the Michigan AFL/CIO in Harrison, MI.

Andrews created the American Legion Band in Savannah known as the "Country Vets," which was an outreach program aimed at veterans in nursing homes and retirement communities. They returned to Maine in 2000, and in May 2001, Gini died after 14 years of fighting cancer.

== Later years ==
In 2002, Andrews was inducted into the Maine Country Music Hall of Fame and in this year he also married his present wife, Carole Ann. In 2004, Slim reprised "The Cumberland Valley Boys" with Vicki James. In May 2005, after 63 years in the country music business, Andrews recorded and released his first album, "Favorites For A Lifetime," consisting of eleven songs. Six of these songs are original songs written by Andrews and his son, Jamie. The three songs that Andrews wrote by himself deal with the changing seasons in his life; the birth of his son, Jamie, his marriage to Gini and her subsequent death, and his signature song, "The Autumn of Our Lives," which tells of his marriage to his third wife, Carole Ann. Slim has recorded several albums and over 200 songs.

In 2017 at the age of 86, Andrews set an all time airplay record for a Maine country music artist. In addition to that, he also set a record for chart appearances by a Maine country music artist on the International Mainstream Country Music Charts.

Andrews was the chairman of the induction committee for the Maine Country Music Hall of Fame and served on its board of directors. He was a major spokesperson for the Maine Country Music Hall of Fame Museum, which he helped to establish. The Maine Country Music Hall of Fame Museum is one of only a few museums of this nature in the entire country.

== Awards and recognition ==
- Inducted Into The Maine Country Music Hall Of Fame 2002
- Duke Knight Memorial Award from The Maine Country Music Association 2003, 2006
- American Legion Post 197 Commander's Award 2006, 2009
- Trailblazer Award From The Pine Tree State Country Music Association 2006
- Gospel Song of The Year From The Maine Country Music Association 2006
- Maine Ole' Opry Award From The Pine Tree State Country Music Association 2007
- Living Legend Award From The Maine Academy of Country Music 2008
- Hal Lone Pine Memorial Award From the Maine Country Music Association
- Album Of the Year Award From the Maine Country Music Association 2010
- Rusty Rogers Award From The Pine Tree State Country Music Association 2011
- Lifetime Achievement Award From Maine Academy of Country Music 2016
- Induction Into The Massachusetts Country Music Awards Association Hall of Fame 2016

== Discography ==
2005 "Favorites For A Lifetime"
2006 "Simply Slim With Harry"
2008 "Through The Years"—Slim Andrews and The Cumberland Valley Revue
2009 "Slim Andrews and His Alvarez"
2011 "Slim Andrews Sings Irish"
