= Jann Darlyn =

American actress (1929–2024)

- Born: Mildredn Darlyn Mersich; August 21, 1929; San Francisco, California, U.S.
- Died: September 11, 2024 (aged 95); Paso Robles, California, U.S.
- Other name: Jan Darlyn
- Occupation: Actress
- Years active: 1950–1960
- Spouse(s): G. Stedman Huard; Robert Plate
- Children: 1

Jann Darlyn (August 21, 1929 – September 11, 2024) was an American actress who was prolific on television with roles in Perry Mason, The George Gobel Show, The Jack Benny Program, and The Bob Cummings Show.

== Early years ==
Darlyn was born in San Francisco, California on August 21, 1929, to Gustav Mersich and Carolyn Kapor. After graduating from Lowell High School, she studied at City College of San Francisco while modeling in print advertisements and at fashion galas. On May 16, 1952, she was crowned Miss San Francisco. Her other titles include Girl of the Golden West and Queen of the Orchid Blossoms.

== Career ==
Although she appeared in several movies, she was known by audiences as one of the models on Queen for a Day alongside Jack Bailey. She stayed with the television series until its cancellation in 1965.

== Death ==
Darlyn died in Paso Robles, California on September 11, 2024, at the age of 95.

== Filmography ==
- The Rise and Fall of Legs Diamond (1960)
- The Naked and the Dead (1958)
- The Joker is Wild (1957)
- The Garment Jungle (1957)
- The Ten Commandments (1956)
- Anything Goes (1956)
- Guys and Dolls (1955)
