= Rory Mallinson =

American actor (1913–1976)

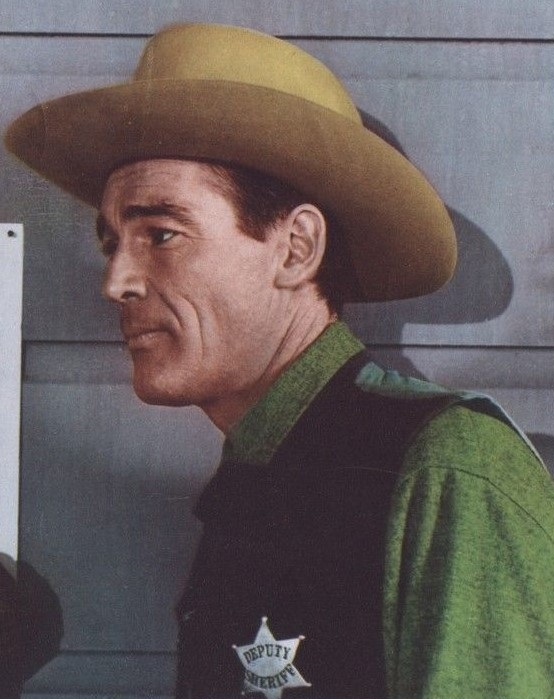
- Mallinson in a Rim of the Canyon (1949) lobby card
- Born: Charles Joseph Mallinson; October 27, 1913; Atlanta, Georgia, U.S.
- Died: March 26, 1976 (aged 62); Los Angeles, California, U.S.
- Occupation: Actor
- Years active: 1945–1968
- Spouses: Helen Mallinson; Eileen D. McNulty

Charles Rory Mallinson (October 27, 1913 – March 26, 1976) was an American film and television actor.

== Career ==
Born in Atlanta, Georgia, Mallinson began his acting career after signing a contract with Warner Brothers in 1945. That year he had a small role in the film, Pride of the Marines, starring John Garfield and Eleanor Powell. Mallinson continued making films through the 1940s, and throughout the 1950s, appearing in over 90 films during this period.

Notable films in which he performed include: a featured role in the 1947 film noir Dark Passage, starring Humphrey Bogart and Lauren Bacall; Mighty Joe Young (1949); the Abbott and Costello vehicle, Abbott and Costello Meet the Invisible Man (1951); the 1952 western, Springfield Rifle, starring Gary Cooper; and Howard Hawks' 1952 film, The Big Sky, which stars Kirk Douglas, Dewey Martin, and Elizabeth Threatt. In the early 1950s, he also had a featured role in the film serial, Blackhawk.

His final performance in the film industry was in the western, Westbound (1959), starring Randolph Scott and Virginia Mayo.

== Death ==
Mallinson died on March 26, 1976, in Los Angeles, aged 62, from undisclosed causes.

== Filmography ==
(Per AFI database)

- Pride of the Marines (1945) as Doctor
- Cloak and Dagger (1946) as Paul (uncredited)
- Two Guys from Milwaukee (1946) as Movie Ticket Taker (uncredited)
- Cry Wolf (1947) as Becket
- Dark Passage (1947) as George Fellsinger
- Deep Valley (1947) as Foreman (uncredited)
- King of the Bandits (1947) as Henchman Burl
- Nora Prentiss (1947) as Fleming
- Possessed (1947) as Coroner's Assistant
- Road to the Big House (1947) as Fred
- That Way with Women (1947) as Man on Grandstand (uncredited)
- For You I Die (1947) as Patrolman Mac
- Berlin Express (1948) as MP Guard on Second Train (uncredited)
- Blonde Ice (1948) as Police Sgt. Benson (uncredited)
- The Checkered Coat (1948) as Perkins
- The Denver Kid (1948) as Jason Fox
- Docks of New Orleans (1948) as Thompson
- Fighter Squadron (1948) as Guard (scenes deleted)
- He Walked by Night (1948) as Detective with Harry (uncredited)
- The Hunted (1948) as Arizona Highway Patrolman (uncredited)
- I Wouldn't Be in Your Shoes (1948) as Harry – 1st Detective
- Last of the Wild Horses (1948) as Henchman Hank Davis
- Open Secret (1948) as Chuck Hill
- Panhandle (1948) as Sheriff Jim
- El Dorado Pass (1948) as Sheriff Tom Wright
- Wake of the Red Witch (1948) as Officer (uncredited)
- Bad Men of Tombstone (1949) as Desert Sheriff
- Angels in Disguise (1949) as Martin Lovell
- Flaxy Martin (1949) as Coroner Intern (uncredited)
- Mighty Joe Young (1949) as 3rd Bartender (uncredited)
- Prince of the Plains (1949) as James Taylor
- Rim of the Canyon (1949) as Sheriff Pat (uncredited)
- Roseanna McCoy (1949) as A Hatfield (uncredited)
- South of Rio (1949) as Captain Dan Brennan
- Sword in the Desert (1949) as Harris (uncredited)
- Task Force (1949) as Jerry Morgan (uncredited)
- Trapped (1949) as Agent Charles (uncredited)
- A Woman's Secret (1949) as Police Lt. Benson (uncredited)
- California Passage (1950) as Wounded Stage Driver (uncredited)
- County Fair (1950) as Grattan
- The Damned Don't Cry (1950) as Johnny Enders (uncredited)
- Salt Lake Raiders (1950) as Sheriff
- Short Grass (1950) as Jim Westfall
- Three Secrets (1950) as Reporter (uncredited)
- Abbott and Costello Meet the Invisible Man (1951) as Tough Guy at Bar (uncredited)
- According to Mrs. Hoyle (1951) as Detective
- Fingerprints Don't Lie (1951) as Brad Evans
- Fort Dodge Stampede (1951) as Sheriff
- Fourteen Hours (1951) as Cop (uncredited)
- Purple Heart Diary (1951) as Capt. Sprock
- Rodeo King and the Senorita (1951) as Sheriff Baxter
- Three Desperate Men (1951) as Ed Larkin
- You're in the Navy Now (1951) as Lieutenant Commander (uncredited)
- The Redhead and the Cowboy (1951) as Carson (uncredited)
- Oh! Susanna (1951) as Vern Davis – Scout (uncredited)
- Cavalry Scout (1951) as Corporal
- The Cimarron Kid (1952) as Deputy (uncredited)
- Carson City (1952) as Crewman (uncredited)
- Deadline – U.S.A. (1952) as Rienzi's Associate (uncredited)
- Hellgate (1952) as Banta
- Laramie Mountains (1952) as Paul Drake – Henchman, aka Bill Turner
- Montana Belle (1952) as Great Dalton
- Scorching Fury (1952) as J.D., the sheriff
- The Sniper (1952) as Police Lineup Organizer (uncredited)
- Springfield Rifle (1952) as Barfly (uncredited)
- Waco (1952) as Crawford
- A Yank in Indo-China (1952) as Prof. William Marlow
- The Big Sky (1952)
- Brave Warrior (1952) as Barker
- Bandits of Corsica (1953)
- Cow Country (1953) as Tim Sykes
- The Great Jesse James Raid (1953) as Cavalry Officer (uncredited)
- Killer Ape (1953) as Perry
- Safari Drums (1953) as Murphy (uncredited)
- The Man Behind the Gun (1953) as Sgt. Riley (uncredited)
- The Human Jungle (1954) as Passerby (uncredited)
- Jesse James vs. the Daltons (1954) as Bob Ford
- Killer Leopard (1954) as Deevers
- The Lone Gun (1954) as Townsman (uncredited)
- Playgirl (1954) as Hotel Doorman (uncredited)
- A Bullet for Joey (1955) as Rent-a-Car Clerk (uncredited)
- One Desire (1955) as Mr. Gray (uncredited)
- Wichita (1955) as Robber #3 (uncredited)
- Seminole Uprising (1955) as Toby Wilson
- Kentucky Rifle (1955) as Indian Chief
- Shotgun (1955) as Frank
- The Helen Morgan Story (1957) as Pageant Reporter (uncredited)
- Shoot-Out at Medicine Bend (1957) as Townsman (uncredited)
- Spoilers of the Forest (1957) as Timber Cruiser (uncredited)
- The Law and Jake Wade (1958) as Deputy (uncredited)
- The Notorious Mr. Monks (1958) as Veterinarian (uncredited)
- King of the Wild Stallions (1959) as Sheriff Cap Fellows
- Westbound (1959) as Hotel Clerk (uncredited)
