= Jeanne Cagney =

American actress (1919–1984)

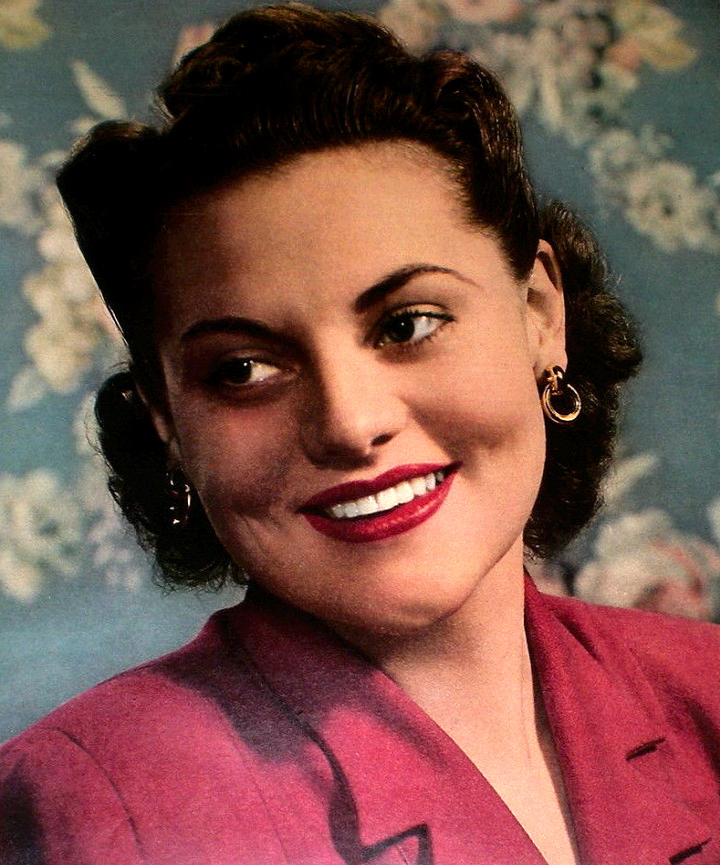
- Cagney, c. 1942
- Born: Jeanne Carolyn Cagney; March 25, 1919; New York City, U.S.
- Died: December 7, 1984 (aged 65); Newport Beach, California, U.S.
- Resting place: Pacific View Memorial Park
- Education: Hunter College
- Occupation: Actress
- Years active: 1939–1965
- Spouses: Kim Spalding (m. 1944; div. 1951) Jack Sherman Morrison (m. 1953; div. 1973)
- Children: 2
- Relatives: James Cagney (brother); William Cagney (brother)

Jeanne Carolyn Cagney (March 25, 1919 – December 7, 1984) was an American film, stage, and television actress.

== Early years ==
Born in New York City, Cagney and her four older brothers were raised by their widowed mother, Carolyn Elizabeth Cagney (née Nelson), after the death of their father, James Francis Cagney Sr. Her brothers included actor James Cagney, production manager Edward Cagney, and producer William Cagney. She attended Hunter College High School. Majoring in French and German, she was a cum laude graduate of Hunter College (now part of City University of New York) and a member of Phi Beta Kappa Society. She also starred in plays produced by the college's dramatic society. Following her college graduation, she studied acting at the Pasadena Playhouse.

== Stage ==
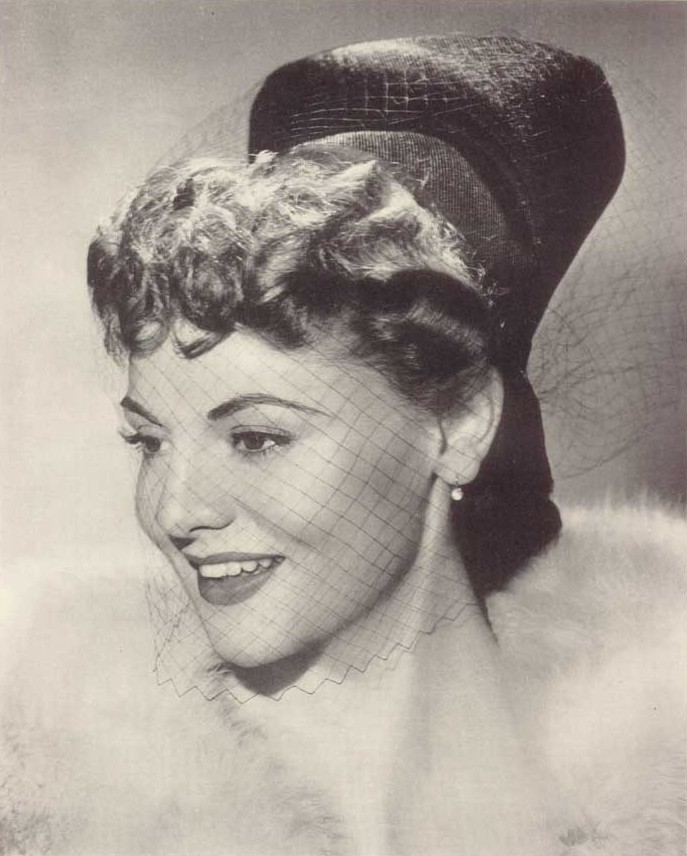
Cagney in 1942

Cagney performed in the original stage production of The Iceman Cometh, which premiered on Broadway on October 9, 1946. The play's author, Eugene O'Neill, cast her in the role of Margie, one of the "street walkers" in his story.

== Film ==
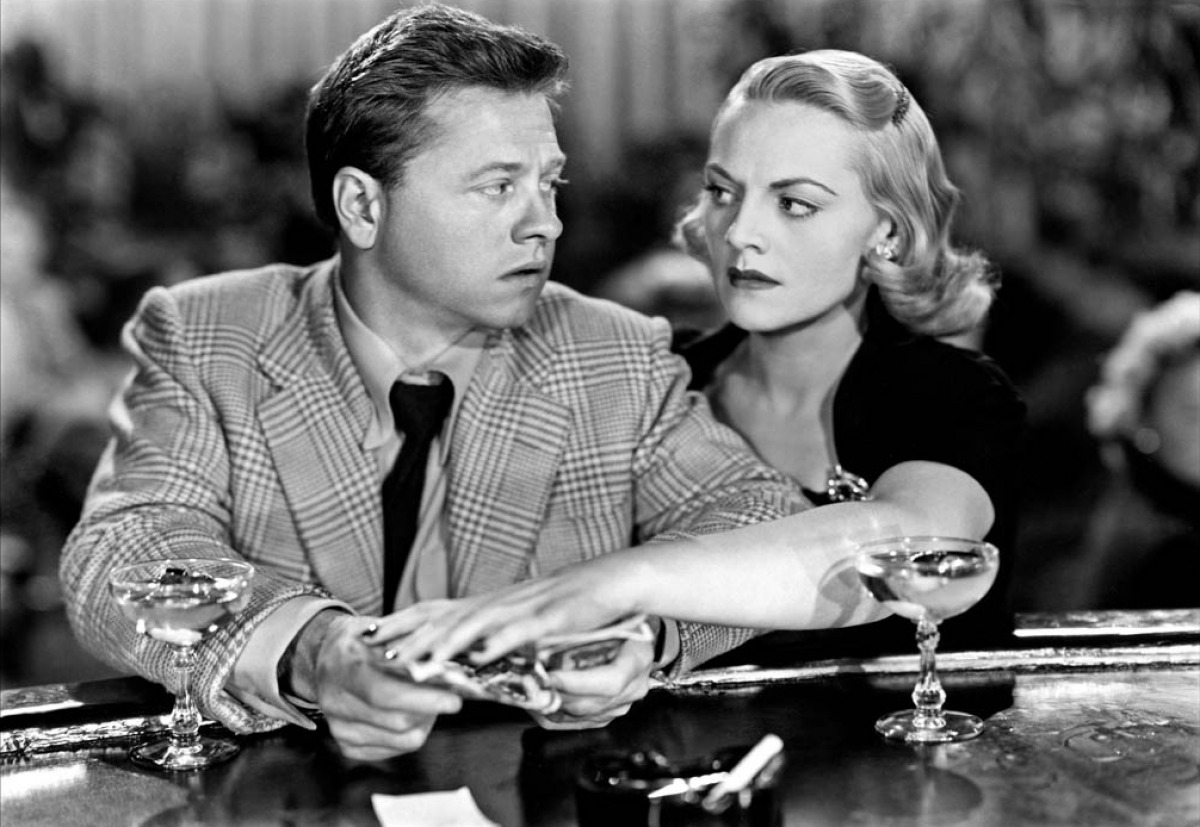
Cagney with Mickey Rooney in Quicksand (1950)

After being heard by a scout while appearing on Bing Crosby's radio program, Cagney had a film test with RKO Pictures. However, she signed a long-term contract with Paramount Pictures. She appeared in 19 films between 1939 and 1965, including four films with her brother James: Yankee Doodle Dandy (1942), The Time of Your Life (1948), A Lion Is in the Streets (1953), and Man of a Thousand Faces (1957). Cagney gave a noted performance opposite Mickey Rooney in the film noir crime film Quicksand (1950).

== Radio ==
Cagney briefly played the title role in the radio soap opera The Romance of Helen Trent. Most of her other work on radio was as a guest in dramatic programs such as the following:

Year	Radio Program	Episode/source
1942	Armstrong's Theatre of Today	NA
1942	Screen Guild Players	Yankee Doodle Dandy
1944	Silver Theater	Wanted -- Adventure for Two
1944	The Kate Smith Hour	Till We Meet Again
1945	Grand Central Station	NA
1946	Grand Central Station	A Lion Is in the Streets
1952	Family Theater	The Red Head
1953	Family Theater	"To the Victor" (with James Cagney)

== Television ==
In 1954, Cagney made a television pilot for a mystery series, Satan's Waiting, but it apparently was not sold. Later, she served as the fashion commentator of Queen for a Day, hosted by Jack Bailey on NBC and ABC from 1956 to 1963. This daytime "game show" is regarded as a forerunner of today's reality shows. Cagney hosted segments that provided viewers with tips on style and introduced to them the latest fashions.

== Family ==
Cagney married actor Ross Latimer (also known as Kim Spalding) in 1944. She was divorced from him March 9, 1951. They had no children. She married Jack Morrison, a faculty member in theater arts at UCLA, on June 6, 1953; they had two daughters, Mary and Terry.

== Death ==
Cagney, at age 65, died of lung cancer in Newport Beach, California, on December 7, 1984. She is buried at Pacific View Memorial Park in Corona del Mar, California.

== Filmography ==
Year	Title	Role	Notes
1939	All Women Have Secrets	Kay Parker Gregory	
1940	Queen of the Mob	Ethel Webster	
1940	Golden Gloves	Mary Parker	
1940	Rhythm on the River	Country Cousin	
1942	Yankee Doodle Dandy	Josie Cohan	
1948	The Time of Your Life	Kitty Duval	
1950	Quicksand	Vera	
1952	Don't Bother to Knock	Rochelle	
1953	A Lion Is in the Streets	Jennie Brown	
1955	Kentucky Rifle	Cordie Hay	
1957	Man of a Thousand Faces	Carrie Chaney	
1965	Town Tamer	Mary Donley	
