= The Eddie Cantor Comedy Theatre =

1955 American anthology comedy series

- Also known as: Eddie Cantor Show
- Genre: Mixed
- Created by: Eddie Cantor
- Presented by: Eddie Cantor
- Country of origin: United States
- No. of seasons: 1
- No. of episodes: 39

Production
- Producer: Eddie Cantor
- Cinematography: Curt Fetters, Robert Hoffman
- Editor: Charles Craft
- Running time: 30 minutes
- Production company: Ziv Television Programs, Inc.

Original release
- Network: First-run syndication
- Release: January 23, 1955

The Eddie Cantor Comedy Theatre is a half-hour filmed American comedy series produced by Eddie Cantor and made at Ziv Television Programs, Inc., for first-run syndication. Cantor hosted and performed on each show. Thirty-nine episodes were produced and aired in 1955 before Cantor decided the show was too much for him to continue doing.

== Premise ==
During November 1954, Cantor explained his idea for television success to columnist Erskine Johnson: "The size of TV screens demands intimacy, close-ups, and not more than half a dozen people on stage at the same time".

This was an unusual mixed genre show, combining elements of comedy, variety and anthology. Each episode might have one or multiple guest stars, who would interact with Cantor before and after any sketches. (There were also supporting actors and extras). Some episodes had a single long sketch with an intermission, others had two or three short sketches, while a few dispensed with sketches for musical variety. The sketches were always light-hearted comedies, with Cantor sometimes performing in them alongside the guest star and supporting players. "I'm the host, but I get around" Cantor said.

A typical show opened with a theater marquee displaying the shows name, the camera moving inside the theater lobby, where a large photo poster of Cantor was displayed, while the guest star name(s) appeared on screen. Cantor would appear backstage, introduce that episode's guest star(s), and they would engage in banter for a few minutes. A sketch might ensue, the conceit being that it was performed before an actual theater audience. Cantor would reappear to introduce a commercial break, often by way of a short skit. The last half of the sketch (or a second sketch, or musical numbers) would follow. When complete, Cantor and the guest star(s) would reengage before a theater curtain to applause. Cantor would then close with a short song just before the credits rolled.

== Production ==
Worn out from doing live television shows, Cantor signed a contract with Ziv Television during the summer of 1954 to do a filmed program. The seven year contract called for 39 films (episodes) per year for a comedy and variety show. Some newspapers reported that the show would have a $9 million dollar budget in order to complete 39 episodes. However, John Sinn of Ziv Television clarified this by saying the average budget per TV episode was $53,000, while the larger figure included seven years of radio shows.

By early November Cantor had completed filming several episodes, while Ziv Television announced the first episode would be available for airing on January 23, 1955.

Columnist Eve Starr reported that Cantor's Comedy Theatre had "sold to 60 syndicated spots its first two weeks on the market". One major sponsor was Burgermeister Beer, which purchased spots in many West Coast markets. Most sponsors however were buying for a single market, such as the First Trust Company and First National Bank, both of Lincoln, Nebraska, which jointly purchased the spot for their city.

By late March 1955 only a few weeks worth of filming remained for the first season, while the number of broadcasting spots sold nationwide approached 180.

== Response ==
John Lester in his syndicated column said the show "was disappointing in its premiere last week, to say the very least and to say it as kindly as possible". John Crosby was more blunt in his column: "The show's a mishmash. Cantor bursts into song... Then there are the sketches, the like of which have not been seen in a long, long time... it reminded me strongly of the sort of thing you'd find in a Broadway revue around 1922". One reviewer voiced a common opinion among critics; after giving the guest star lineup for an episode, he said: "That's a lot of talent for Eddie to hide while he hogs the camera".

Erskine Johnson reported in September 1955 that Cantor wanted to stop doing the show after 39 episodes because "It's just too much for me".

== Broadcast history ==
The first episode broadcast was on Monday, January 23, 1955. Since it was syndicated, stations ran it on different days of the week, and at various times, usually after network programming had ended for the evening. In many markets it replaced the show Foreign Intrigue, which had had the same sponsors. Newspapers often shortened the name in television listings to Eddie Cantor Show. Stations first started broadcasting the show anywhere from January thru April depending on the market. Episodes were often skipped or shown out of release order. Because it was syndicated and stations had already paid for one-time showings of the episodes, it continued to be broadcast as late as August 1956.

=== Episodes ===
In the following table multiple sketches are indicated by numbers in parentheses. "Original Air Date", except for the first episode, is omitted: all 39 episodes were available for broadcasting by May 1955.

| No. overall | No. in season | Title | Directed by | Written by | Original release date |
|---|---|---|---|---|---|
| 1 | 1 | "Now in Rehearsal" | Unknown | Unknown | January 23, 1955 |
(1) Man babysits his unruly toddler nephew and a St. Bernard dog. (2) Cantor plays inventor of remote control popcorn machine. Cast: Brian Aherne, Eddie Cantor
| 2 | 2 | "Nearly Normal" | TBA | TBA | TBA |
Argumentative newlyweds must deal with sudden wealth. Cast: Don DeFore (Vic Pruitt), Pat Crowley (Sally Pruitt)
| 3 | 3 | "The Big Bargain" | TBA | TBA | TBA |
The husband of a bargain hunter suffers misfortune trying to keep up. Cast: Billie Burke, James Gleason, Frank Jenks, Ralph Peters
| 4 | 4 | "The Hypochondriac" | TBA | TBA | TBA |
Man mistakenly believes he has only 12 minutes to live. Cast: Virginia Field (Margie), Eddie Cantor (Harold Clinker)
| 5 | 5 | "A Hunting We Will Go" | TBA | TBA | TBA |
Shy secretary sets out to bag a husband. Cast: Lizabeth Scott, Craig Stevens, Ken Tobey
| 6 | 6 | "The Suspicious Husband" | TBA | TBA | TBA |
Nervous husband thinks wife plans to kill him for insurance money. Cast: Bonita Granville, Buddy Ebsen, Allen Jenkins
| 7 | 7 | "Garage" | TBA | TBA | TBA |
Cantor plays a service station attendant. Cast: Eddie Cantor
| 8 | 8 | "Romance Wrecker" | TBA | TBA | TBA |
Retired Colonel tries to play Cupid for young folks. Cast: Charles Coburn, Cathy Downs
| 9 | 9 | "The Atomic Brain" | TBA | TBA | TBA |
Math genius becomes dysfunctional around cute women. Cast: Allyn Joslyn, Marie Windsor
| 10 | 10 | "The Critics" | TBA | TBA | TBA |
To impress three "critics", Cantor performs: 1) The Piano Tuner 2) Barbershop Quartet, with all parts by Cantor 3) Wedding Day, of butcher's assistant. Cast: Eddie Cantor
| 11 | 11 | "The Helper" | TBA | TBA | TBA |
Wife tries to help husband swing business deal. Cast: Marjorie Reynolds, Bill Goodwin, Selmer Jackson, Fay Baker, Pierre Watkin
| 12 | 12 | "The Wizard" | TBA | TBA | TBA |
Cast:
| 13 | 13 | "The Mink Coat" | TBA | TBA | TBA |
Expensive mink is mistakenly shipped from ritzy store in place of lingerie. Cast: Jean Parker, Adele Jergens, George Givot
| 14 | 14 | "The Finer Points" | TBA | TBA | TBA |
Uncouth brawler, wanting to impress a rich man, hires an etiquette teacher. Cast: Robert Strauss, Jack LaRue, Helen Mowery, Douglass Dumbrille
| 15 | 15 | "The Sure Cure" | TBA | TBA | TBA |
Glum complaint department adjustor must liven up to win girl. Cast: Peter Lorre, Veda Ann Borg
| 16 | 16 | "Commercially Ever After" | TBA | TBA | TBA |
Forgotten TV star makes comeback by "sponsoring" himself with an imaginary product. Cast: Eddie Cantor, Tris Coffin, John Gallaudet
| 17 | 17 | "The Practical Joker" | TBA | TBA | TBA |
Family endures constant pranks from irrepresible relative. Cast: Joe E. Brown, Eddie Cantor
| 18 | 18 | "Always the Butler" | TBA | TBA | TBA |
Comical "mystery" has Rathbone make fun of his Sherlock Holmes role. Cast: Basil Rathbone
| 19 | 19 | "A Night at the Follies" | TBA | TBA | TBA |
All musical variety episode ala the Ziegfeld Follies. Cast: John Barrymore Jr, Eddie Cantor, the Szony Dancers, the Appleton Trio
| 20 | 20 | "V for Victoria" | TBA | TBA | TBA |
Cast:
| 21 | 21 | "How Much for Van Such" | Leon Benson | Albert E. Lewin; Burt Styler | TBA |
Cast: Vincent Price (Van Such), Richard Karlan, Pamela Duncan, Charles Williams, Richard Benedict, Keith Richards, Alan Reynolds, Ken Christy
| 22 | 22 | "Dying to Live" | TBA | TBA | TBA |
Herman Fergie (Cantor) is both hypochondriac and a "living A-bomb". Cast: Eddie Cantor
| 23 | 23 | "Bombshell Goes to College" | TBA | TBA | TBA |
Chorus girl marries college professor. Cast: Joan Blondell
| 24 | 24 | "Call Me Irving" | TBA | TBA | TBA |
To prep for a Broadway role, shy young man takes job in rough dive. Cast: Johnnie Johnston
| 25 | 25 | "Ten Thousand Years from Now (Note: The storyline and cast belong together, but may not belong to this episode title.)" | TBA | TBA | TBA |
Unjustly convicted man creates thriving business while in prison. Cast: Edward Arnold, Walter Kingsford
| 26 | 26 | "What Do You Want in a Show" | TBA | TBA | TBA |
1) The Safe Driver 2) The Yachting Party. Cast: Reginald Denny
| 27 | 27 | "The Playboy" | TBA | TBA | TBA |
Cast: Rudy Vallee
| 28 | 28 | "Man Who Liked Little People" | TBA | TBA | TBA |
Apartment manager, who only rents to short people, can't evict tall Mrs. Bullit. Cast: Edmund Gwenn
| 29 | 29 | "The Lieutenant Was No Gentleman" | TBA | TBA | TBA |
Pentagon sends WAC officer to command male infantry platoon. Cast: Ann Sheridan
| 30 | 30 | "The Song Pluggers" | TBA | TBA | TBA |
Cantor plays a struggling song plugger trying to avoid getting fired. Cast: Ray Anthony, Helen O'Connell, Eddie Cantor
| 31 | 31 | "Four Strikes" | TBA | TBA | TBA |
Neglected wife of fanatical baseball umpire tries to recapture his attention. Cast: Pat O'Brien
| 32 | 32 | "The Square World of Alonzo Pennyworth" | TBA | TBA | TBA |
Travel agent Pennyworth daydreams of travel and his girl Linda. Cast: Buster Keaton
| 33 | 33 | "Triplets" | TBA | TBA | TBA |
Cast:
| 34 | 34 | "A Night at the U.S. Mint" | TBA | TBA | TBA |
Cast: The Three Stooges, Eddie Cantor
| 35 | 35 | "The Marine Went to Town" | TBA | TBA | TBA |
Pfc. Jimmy Moore wins $20k which Sgt. Al Sweeny and girlfriend try to get. Cast: Stan Freberg, Victor McLaglen, Julio Sebastian
| 36 | 36 | "The Hollywood Story" | TBA | TBA | TBA |
Cast:
| 37 | 37 | "The Tester" | TBA | TBA | TBA |
Cast:
| 38 | 38 | "Strange Little Stranger" | TBA | TBA | TBA |
Man blames his wife's fictitious ailments for his own chronic tardiness. Cast: Tommy Noonan, Joyce Holden
| 39 | 39 | "And Now from the Audience" | TBA | TBA | TBA |
Pro quiz show contestant wins prizes but no money for his back rent. Cast: William Frawley
