= The Time of Your Life (film) =

1948 film by H. C. Potter

- Original film poster
- Directed by: H. C. Potter
- Written by: Nathaniel Curtis
- Based on: The Time of Your Life; 1939 play by William Saroyan
- Produced by: William Cagney
- Starring: James Cagney; William Bendix; Wayne Morris; Jeanne Cagney
- Cinematography: James Wong Howe
- Edited by: Walter Hannemann; Truman K. Wood
- Music by: Carmen Dragon
- Production company: William Cagney Productions
- Distributed by: United Artists
- Release dates: May 26, 1948 (New York City); September 3, 1948 (United States)
- Running time: 109 minutes 105 minutes (Turner library print)
- Country: United States
- Language: English
- Budget: $2 million
- Box office: $1.5 million

The Time of Your Life is a 1948 American comedy drama film directed by H. C. Potter and starring James Cagney, William Bendix, Wayne Morris and Jeanne Cagney. A Cagney Production, The Time of Your Life was produced by Cagney's brother William and adapted by Nathaniel Curtis from the 1939 William Saroyan play of the same name. Cinematography was by James Wong Howe.

== Plot ==
The film is set, with a few exceptions, entirely at Nick's 'Pacific Street Saloon, Restaurant and Entertainment Palace' in San Francisco, where a sign in the window announces "Come in and be yourself," signed "Nick". Joe sits at one of the saloon's tables much of the time, observing people coming and going. He is unemployed but apparently well-off, constantly ordering champagne and giving advice or money to others. (It is implied that he has a knack for choosing winning horses at races.) He desires to live "a civilized life" without hurting anyone and believes the real truth in people is found in their dreams of themselves, not the hard facts of their actual existence.

Joe's best friend and "stooge," Tom, believes that he owes his life to Joe and runs peculiar errands for him without any apparent desire to make a life for himself. Other major characters include Kitty Duval, a supposed burlesque actress whose real name is Katerina Kornovsky. It is implied that she has actually been a prostitute. Tom is innocently infatuated with her, but he only gets the nerve to ask her out and to pursue his courtship with Joe's urging and help. One young man, Willie, is a "marble game [pinball machine] maniac." Another, Dudley Raoul Bostwick, keeps trying to get up the nerve to call his girlfriend, Elsie Mandelspiegel. At one point, he mistakenly calls a different, older woman and asks her to meet him at Nick's but pretends to be someone else when she arrives. Harry, a "natural-born tap dancing comedian" who cannot make people laugh, is hired by Nick and dances often during the film. A young Black man enters looking for any kind of work and is hired to wash dishes, but when he notices Nick's piano, he shows his talent and is amazed that Nick will hire him simply to play.

Among the other characters who come to Nick's, two of the most significant are Freddie Blick, who extorts money from Nick and later harasses Kitty, and an older man dressed like a cowboy who refers to himself as "Kit Carson". By the end of the film, Blick's attempt to humiliate and coerce Kitty is foiled by the efforts of Kit Carson, Joe, and Tom; Willie finally wins his game; Dudley and Elsie are reunited; and Joe sends Tom and Kitty off to be married, with Tom now having an independent job as a truck driver. As Joe and Kit sit down to continue telling each other tall tales, Nick takes his sign advising customers to be themselves and rips it up, proclaiming "Enough is enough!"

== Cast ==
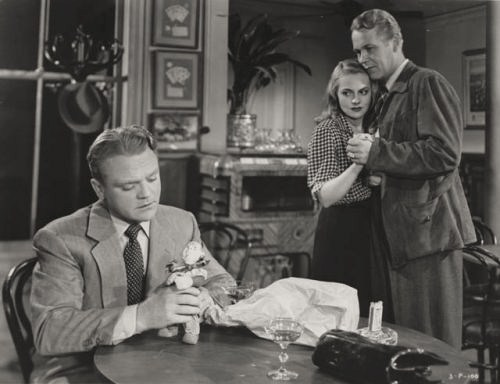
James Cagney, Jeanne Cagney and Wayne Morris in The Time of Your Life.

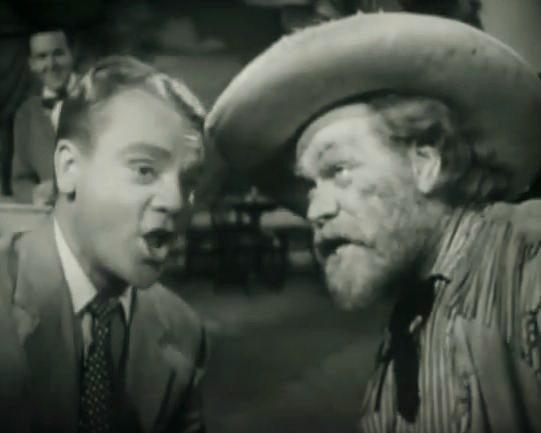
James Cagney and James Barton

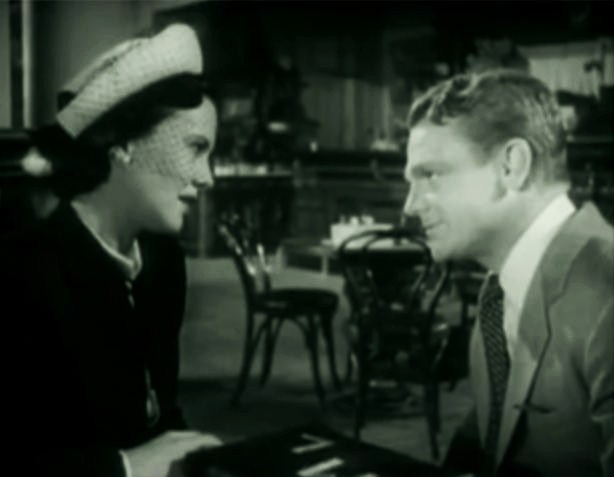
Gale Page and James Cagney

- James Cagney as Joseph T. (who observes people)
- William Bendix as Nick (Saloon Owner Who Loves Horses)
- Wayne Morris as Tom (Joe's stooge and friend)
- Jeanne Cagney as Kitty Duval (stage name of Katerina Koronovsky)
- Broderick Crawford as Krupp (a bewildered policeman)
- Ward Bond as McCarthy (a blatherskite)
- James Barton as Kit Carson (a cowboy also called Murphy)
- Paul Draper as Harry (the natural-born tap dancing comedian)
- Gale Page as Mary L. (a woman of quality)
- Jimmy Lydon as Dudley Raoul Bostwick (a young man in love) (as James Lydon)
- Richard Erdman as Willie (the pinball machine maniac)
- Pedro de Cordoba as Arab Philosopher
- Reginald Beane as Wesley (the pianist)
- John 'Skins' Miller as A Tippler
- Tom Powers as Freddie Blick (a stool pigeon and frame up artist)
- Natalie Schafer as Society Lady
- Howard Freeman as Society Gentleman
- Renie Riano as Lorene Smith (a blind date)
- Nanette Parks as Elsie Mandelspiegel (a girl in love)
- Grazia Narciso as Nick's Mother
- Claire Carleton as 'Killer'
- Gladys Blake as Side-kick
- Lanny Rees as Newsboy
- Marlene Aames as Nick's Daughter

== Production ==
The Cagneys admired the play and acquired its film rights on the condition that theirs not be in release longer than seven years. They gave their director and cinematographer two weeks for blocking, but changed their minds once filming began, spending freely and breaking their budget. The film was shot mostly on one set

The film was shot using Saroyan's original ending where Kit shot and killed Blick offstage, whom the Production Code Administration had forced the producers to change from a police detective into an informer and blackmailer. The audience heard the shots and saw Kit walk in relating the event as one of his stories "I shot a man once. In San Francisco. Shot him two times...Fellow named Blick or Glick or something. Couldn't stand the way he talked to ladies".

Preview audiences reacted unfavourably. Cagney asked Saroyan to write a more acceptable ending but Saroyan priced his work out of Cagney's reach. A new action-packed climax was substituted with Joe knocking him unconscious, leading Kit to think he had shot him dead, and Nick later throwing him out onto the street as Kitty and Tom state their intent to get married.

== Reception ==
In Time in 1948, critic James Agee wrote: " ... a good deal which would be as taut and resonant as a drumhead on the stage is relatively dull and slack on the screen. On the other hand, those who made the picture have given it something very rare. It's obvious that they love the play and their work in it, and their affection and enjoyment, are highly contagious. They have done so handsomely by Saroyan that in the long run everything depends on how much of Saroyan you can take. Saroyan is an entertainer of a kind overrated by some people and underrated by others—a very gifted schmalz-artist ... The schmalz-artist requires more belief, more wishful thinking on the part of his audience, than better artists would dare require." British critic Leslie Halliwell stated: "Not really a film at all, this essence of Saroyan contains much to enjoy or to annoy. The performances are pretty good."

The film was a failure at the box office.

== Remake ==
A Playhouse 90 television version ten years later starring Jackie Gleason as Joe earned critical acclaim, with Jack Klugman as Nick, Dick York as Tom, Betsy Palmer as Kitty, and James Barton reprising his role as Kit Carson.
