= Across the Badlands =

1950 film by Fred F. Sears

- Theatrical release poster
- Directed by: Fred F. Sears
- Screenplay by: Barry Shipman
- Produced by: Colbert Clark
- Starring: Charles Starrett; Smiley Burnette; Helen Mowery; Stanley Andrews; Robert J. Wilke; Dick Elliott
- Cinematography: Fayte M. Browne
- Edited by: Paul Borofsky
- Production company: Columbia Pictures
- Distributed by: Columbia Pictures
- Release date: September 14, 1950
- Running time: 55 minutes
- Country: United States
- Language: English

Across the Badlands is a 1950 American Western film directed by Fred F. Sears and written by Barry Shipman. The film stars Charles Starrett, Smiley Burnette, Helen Mowery, Stanley Andrews, Robert J. Wilke and Dick Elliott. It was released on September 14, 1950, by Columbia Pictures. This was the 49th of 65 films in the Durango Kid series.

== Cast ==
- Charles Starrett as Steve Ransom / The Durango Kid
- Smiley Burnette as Smiley
- Helen Mowery as Eileen Carson
- Stanley Andrews as Sheriff Crocker
- Robert J. Wilke as Duke Jackson / Keno Jackson
- Dick Elliott as Rufus Downey
- Hugh Prosser as Jeff Carson
- Robert Cavendish as Bart
- Charles Evans as Gregory Banion
- Paul Campbell as Pete
- Harmonica Bill as Harmonica Bill

== Production ==
Production began on April 3, 1950, and wrapped within one week. The film was screened for audiences as early as April 21.
