= The Fighting Frontiersman =

1946 film by Derwin Abrahams

- Theatrical release poster
- Directed by: Derwin Abrahams
- Screenplay by: Ed Earl Repp
- Produced by: Colbert Clark
- Starring: Charles Starrett; Helen Mowery; Hank Newman; Smiley Burnette
- Cinematography: Philip Tannura
- Edited by: Jerome Thoms
- Production company: Columbia Pictures
- Distributed by: Columbia Pictures
- Release date: December 10, 1946
- Running time: 61 minutes
- Country: United States
- Language: English

The Fighting Frontiersman is a 1946 American Western film directed by Derwin Abrahams and written by Ed Earl Repp. The film stars Charles Starrett, Helen Mowery, Hank Newman and Smiley Burnette. The film was released on December 10, 1946, by Columbia Pictures. This was the eighteenth of 65 films in the Durango Kid series.

== Plot ==
After stumbling upon a large cache of gold in Texas, prospector Cimarron Dobbs (Emmett Lynn) is wary of being swindled out of his fortunate fortune. The gold was left behind by Santa Anna's army, and Dobbs needs help. Dobbs heads out to the local town of Twin Forks, where he hopes his friend, saloon girl Dixie King (Helen Mowery) will help him. When he shows King a sample of his find he is unaware that saloon owner John Munro (Robert Filmer) is taking notice. King tell Dobbs that he should seek the help of Steve Reynolds (Charles Starrett), aka the mysterious rider – the Durango Kid. Monroe's shady gang kidnap Dobbs, intent on torturing the location of the gold from him. King contacts the Durango Kid, who heads to town with his trusty sidekick, Smiley (Smiley Burnette). The Durango Kid disguise comes out, Smiley does some sleuthing, and a barroom brawl breaks out.

Monroe blindfolds and drags King to the hideout Dobbs is being held, hoping she will draw out the information he wants when he promises her half the gold. Dobbs distrusts her, so she offers to prove her honorable intentions by returning with the Durango Kidd's Ranger star, to gain his trust. Meanwhile, Reynolds already suspects that Monroe is up to no good, and offers a $5,000 reward, and promises to share the wealth with the town for information on the gang's hideout. Back at the hideout, King is again blindfolded and taken back to town; but, all the while secretly leaving a trail of beads for the Durango Kid. The "Kid" finds his way to the lair, rescues the damsel and Dobbs, and defeats the bad guys in a gun battle.

== Cast ==
- Charles Starrett as Steve Reynolds / The Durango Kid
- Helen Mowery as Dixie King
- Hank Newman as Hank Newman
- Smiley Burnette as Smiley Burnette
- Emmett Lynn as Cimarron Dobbs
- Robert Filmer as John Munro
- George Chesebro as Rankin
- Zon Murray as Slade
- Jim Diehl as Blaze
- Maudie Prickett as Kate
- Russell Meeker as Bartender
- Frank Ellis as Guard
- Ernie Adams as Printer
- Frank LaRue as Roberts
- Jock Mahoney as Waco
