= Avalanche (1946 film) =

1946 film directed by Irving Allen

- Film poster
- Directed by: Irving Allen
- Written by: Edward Anhalt as "Andrew Holt"
- Produced by: Pat Di Cicco
- Cinematography: Jack Greenhalgh
- Production company: Producers Releasing Corporation
- Release date: 1946
- Running time: 67 minutes
- Country: United States
- Language: English

Avalanche is a 1946 American action film directed by Irving Allen.

== Plot ==
Steve, a US treasury agent, tracks down a tax evader to a ski lodge.

== Cast ==
- Bruce Cabot as Steve Batchellor
- Roscoe Karns as Red Kelly
- Helen Mowery as Ann Watson
- Veda Ann Borg as Claire Jeremy
- Regina Wallace as Mrs. Carlton Morris [Eva]
- John Good as Sven Worden
- Philip Van Zandt as Malone
- Eddie Parks as Mr. Carlton Morris
- Wilton Graff as Austin Jeremy
- Henry Hayes Morgan as Duncan
- Eddie Hyams as Jean
- Eddy Waller as Sam

== Production ==
Filming started February 1946. Location shooting at the Alta Ski Area began February 19, 1946, with Utah's Alf Engen and Corey Engen doing most of the skiing for the cameras. The location cast and crew of 40 stayed at the Hotel Utah, commuting to Alta each day for filming.

Albert Broccoli was the production manager. He and director Irving Allen were classmates at New York's Bryant High School. They teamed up on this film together and would go on to collaborate a number of times, notably as partners in Warwick Productions.

== Reception ==
The New York Times called the film a "painful hodge podge".
