= William Cagney =

American film producer and actor

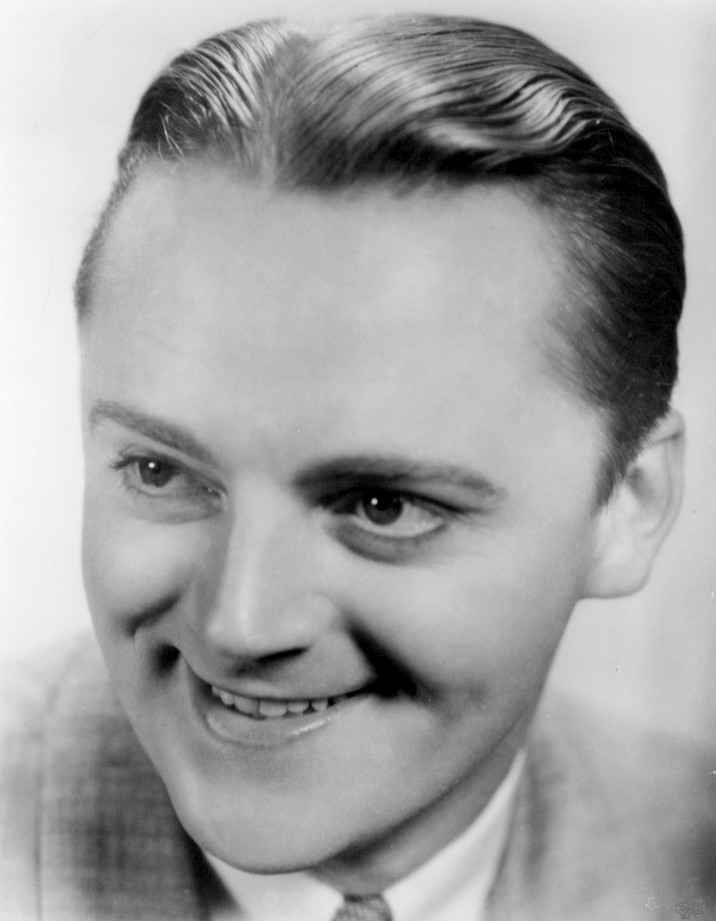
- Born: March 26, 1905; New York City, U.S.
- Died: January 3, 1988 (aged 82); Newport Beach, California, U.S.
- Resting place: Pacific View Memorial Park, Corona del Mar, Newport Beach
- Occupations: Actor; film producer
- Years active: 1933–1953
- Spouses: Boots Mallory (m. 1933; div. 1946) Nadine Crumney Parker (m. 1951; div. 1954)
- Children: 3
- Relatives: James Cagney (brother); Jeanne Cagney (sister)

William Jerome Cagney (March 26, 1905 – January 3, 1988) was an American film producer and actor, remembered for roles in the Monogram Pictures films Lost in the Stratosphere and Flirting with Danger, both filmed in 1934.

== Career ==
He produced several of his older lookalike brother James Cagney's films, including City for Conquest (1940), Johnny Come Lately (1943), Blood on the Sun (1945), The Time of Your Life (1948), Kiss Tomorrow Goodbye (1950), and A Lion Is in the Streets (1953). He was credited as an associate producer on The Bride Came C.O.D. (1941) and Yankee Doodle Dandy (1942), and he also handled his brother's business affairs, negotiating several of his Hollywood studio contracts.

== Personal life ==
Cagney was married to actress Boots Mallory; they had two children together, Jill and Stephen, before their divorce in 1946. He next married Nadine Parker, and they had one child together, William Jr., before their divorce in 1954. Cagney died on January 3, 1988, in Newport Beach, California, aged 82.

== Filmography ==
Year	Title	Role	Notes
1933	Ace of Aces	2nd Lt. Meeker	Uncredited
1934	Palooka	Al McSwatt	
1934	Lost in the Stratosphere	Lt. Tom 'Soapy' Cooper	
1934	Flirting with Danger	William 'Lucky' Davis	
1935	Stolen Harmony	'Schoolboy' Howe	Uncredited, (final film acting role)
