= Queen for a Day (film) =

1951 film by Arthur Lubin

- Theatrical release poster
- Directed by: Arthur Lubin
- Screenplay by: Seton I. Miller
- Story by: Faith Baldwin; John Ashworth; Dorothy Parker
- Produced by: Robert Stillman
- Starring: Jack Bailey; Jim Morgan; Fort Pearson; Melanie York; Cynthia Corley; Kay Wiley; Helen Mowery
- Cinematography: Guy Roe
- Edited by: George Amy
- Music by: Hugo Friedhofer
- Production company: Robert Stillman Productions
- Distributed by: United Artists
- Release date: July 7, 1951
- Running time: 107 minutes
- Country: United States
- Language: English

Queen for a Day is a 1951 American anthology comedy film directed by Arthur Lubin, written by Seton I. Miller and starring Jack Bailey, Jim Morgan, Fort Pearson, Melanie York, Cynthia Corley, Kay Wiley and Helen Mowery. The film is related to the quiz show Queen for a Day, which aired on radio beginning in 1945 and was hosted on television by Bailey from 1956–1964. The film was released on July 7, 1951 by United Artists.

== Plot ==
Radio quiz-show producer Jim Morgan reads letters to host Jack Bailey from listeners telling of the impact of their appearance as contestants on Queen for a Day on their lives. Three stories are presented.

In "The Gossamer World", Marjorie Watkins thanks the show for sending a toy engine to her six-year-old son Pete, who has a wild imagination. Marjorie tells her husband Dan that she is worried that Pete has no friends his own age. Pete introduces his imaginary friend named Shun, short for "distinction", to his parents and blames Shun for his own accidents. Marjorie worries that Pete will not take responsibility, so Dan chats with him about the subject. On Pete's first day of school, he befriends a boy named Jim, and Pete later admits that inventing Shun was a silly game. Pete later contracts polio, and the train means everything to him because it will be his only mode of mobility until he walks again someday.

In "High Diver", the son of immigrant parents attempts to raise money for college by performing a dangerous high dive.

In "Horsie", an elderly woman, childless and never married, cares for other people's children to gain a sense of fulfillment.

== Cast ==
=== Broadcast studio ===
- Jack Bailey as Jack Bailey
- Jim Morgan as Jim Morgan
- Fort Pearson as Ford Pearson
- Melanie York as First Contestant
- Cynthia Corley as Second Contestant
- Kay Wiley as Third Contestant
- Helen Mowery as Jan
- Dian Fauntelle as Helena

=== "The Gossamer World" ===
- Phyllis Avery as Marjorie
- Darren McGavin as Dan
- Rudy Lee as Pete
- Frances E. Williams as Anna
- Joan Winfield as Laura
- Lonnie Burr as Charles
- Tris Coffin as Doctor
- Jiggs Wood as Mr. Beck
- Casey Folks as Jim
- George Sherwood as Mr. Garmes

=== "High Diver" ===
- Adam Williams as Chuck
- Kasia Orzazewski as Mrs. Nalawak
- Ben Astar as Mr. Nalawak
- Tracey Roberts as Peggy
- Larry Johns as Deacon McAllister
- Bernard Szold as Daredevil Rinaldi
- Joan Sudlow as Mrs. McAllister
- Grace Lenard as Mrs. Rinaldi
- Leonard Nimoy as Chief
- Danny Davenport as Satchelbutt
- Madge Blake as Mrs. Kimpel

=== "Horsie" ===
- Edith Meiser as Miss Wilmarth
- Dan Tobin as Owen Cruger
- Jessie Cavitt as Camilla Cruger
- Douglas Evans as Freddy Forster
- Don Shelton as Jack Minot
- Louise Currie as Secretary
- Sheila Watson as Mary
- Minna Phillips as The Cook
- Byron Keith as The Chauffeur

== Production ==
Queen for a Day was a popular radio quiz show in the 1940s and 1950s with an audience of five million listeners. Film rights to the show had been optioned by Seymour Nebenzal and Jesse L. Lasky, but neither had exercised the option. In September 1949, Robert Stillman, a former associate of Stanley Kramer, bought the screen rights. Stillman had been looking to produce an anthology film similar to Trio (1950) and wanted to employ the quiz show as a framing device, later stating, "We found a commercial hook for a picture we didn't have to compromise with." Stillman had planned the film as his first under a deal with United Artists, but he instead opted to produce The Condemned (which became The Sound of Fury). Queen for a Day would be the second in a proposed slate of six films.

In November 1949, Seton I. Miller signed to be an associate producer and to write the script.

Stillman had originally planned to film four stories. In January 1950, he acquired the screen rights to the story "The High Diver" by John Ainsworth and Faith Baldwin's 1948 magazine story "This Gossamer World". Stillman purchased Dorothy Parker's story "Horsie" in June.

Director Arthur Lubin was hired in February 1950. Lubin directed the entire film, which was unusual for anthology films of the time, many of which featured separate directors for each segment. Filming began in September 1950.

Most of the 36 actors cast were relative unknowns to film, although some had theater experience, such as Darren McGavin, who had appeared on stage in Death of a Salesman. Stillman reportedly invited Mickey Rooney's son Mickey Rooney Jr. to play a role in "This Gossamer World", but the younger Rooney refused.

== Release ==
The film's world premiere was held in Waycross, Georgia, a town whose residents mailed 32,650 postcards in a contest, the highest per capita of any city.

A slightly different version of the film was produced for release in France, where the quiz show was formatted differently.

The film was released in some markets as Horsie.

== Reception ==
The Los Angeles Times praised the "exceptionally capable" younger actors.

Lubin later said, "I thought it was one of the most interesting pictures up to that time that I have ever directed", but felt that the box-office performance was disappointing because audiences could watch the original quiz show on television.
