= Air Hostess (1949 film) =

1949 film by Lew Landers

- Directed by: Lew Landers
- Written by: Robert Libott; Frank Burt; Louise Rousseau
- Produced by: Wallace MacDonald
- Starring: Gloria Henry; Ross Ford; Audrey Long; Marjorie Lord; William Wright; Ann Doran
- Cinematography: Allen G. Siegler
- Edited by: James Sweeney
- Production company: Columbia Pictures
- Distributed by: Columbia Pictures
- Release date: August 25, 1949
- Running time: 60 minutes
- Country: United States
- Language: English

Air Hostess is a 1949 American drama film directed by Lew Landers and starring Gloria Henry, Ross Ford, and Audrey Long.

The film's sets were designed by the art director Harold H. MacArthur.

== Plot ==
A group of woman arrive at an academy for air hostesses and encounter ups and downs until graduation day.

== Cast ==
- Gloria Henry as Ruth Jackson
- Ross Ford as Dennis Hogan
- Audrey Long as Lorraine Carter
- Marjorie Lord as Jennifer White
- William Wright as Fred MacCoy
- Ann Doran as Virginia Barton
- Olive Deering as Helen Field
- Leatrice Joy as Celia Hansen
- Barbara Billingsley as Madeline Moore
- Harry Tyler as Jeff Farrell
- Jessie Arnold as Mrs. Peabody
- Irene Tedrow as Miss Hamilton
- Grady Sutton as Ned Jenkins
- Helen Mowery as Midge
- Myron Healey as Ralph
- Sarah Edwards as Bertha Hallum
- Isabel Withers as Miss Fish
- Harry Cheshire as Dr. Lee

== Bibliography ==
- Michael L. Stephens. Art Directors in Cinema: A Worldwide Biographical Dictionary. McFarland, 2008.
