= Kim Spalding =

American actor (1915–2000)

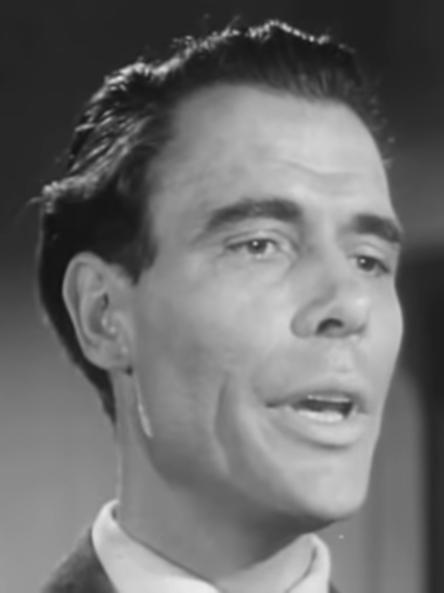
- Spalding in Stories of the Century, 1954
- Born: Ross F. Latimer; December 7, 1915; Washington, Missouri, U.S.
- Died: November 18, 2000 (aged 84); Los Angeles, California
- Occupations: Film, television and theatre actor
- Years active: 1940–1961
- Spouse: Jeanne Cagney (m. 1944; div. 1951)

Kim Spalding (born Ross F. Latimer; December 7, 1915 – November 18, 2000) was an American film, television and theatre actor.

== Life and career ==
Spalding was born in Washington, Missouri, the son of Ross Latimer. He began his film career in 1940 with an appearance in the film Rancho Grande. Spalding then appeared in the 1942 film Shepherd of the Ozarks, playing the role of a soldier. He worked on several jobs such as an auto mechanic, lithography seller, photographer, professional boxer and a upholsterer. Spalding also had his own musical ensemble.

During the 1940s Spalding appeared on stage in New York, including three Broadway plays, but by 1949 he had returned to Hollywood. Spalding played the role of a navy lieutenant in the 1950 film Three Came Home. Further film appearances included Experiment Alcatraz, Three Desperate Men, Off Limits, The Day the Earth Stood Still, A Man Alone, The Gunfighter, The True Story of Lynn Stuart, The Jackpot and Hurricane Smith.

His television credits include State Trooper, The Loretta Young Show, The Deputy, Stories of the Century, The Californians, The Millionaire and 26 Men. His final film credit was for the 1958 film It! The Terror from Beyond Space, in which he played the starring role of Commander Van Heusen. By 1959 Spalding was living in the Sierra Madre Mountains.

== Personal life ==
Spalding married actress Jeanne Cagney in 1944. She filed for divorce from Spalding in February 1951. The divorce became final on March 9, 1951. They had no children.

== Death ==
Spalding died on November 18, 2000, in Los Angeles, California, at the age of 84.
