= For You I Die =

1947 film by John Reinhardt

- Theatrical release poster
- Directed by: John Reinhardt
- Screenplay by: Robert Presnell Sr.
- Produced by: Robert Presnell Sr. and John Reinhardt
- Starring: Cathy Downs; Paul Langton; Mischa Auer; Roman Bohnen
- Cinematography: William Clothier
- Edited by: Jason Bernie
- Music by: Paul Sawtell (musical director and score)
- Production companies: Arpi Productions, Inc.
- Distributed by: A Film Classics Release
- Release date: December 17, 1947 (United States)
- Running time: 76 minutes
- Country: United States
- Language: English

For You I Die (1947) by John Reinhardt

For You I Die is a 1947 American film noir directed by John Reinhardt and starring Cathy Downs, Paul Langton, Mischa Auer and Roman Bohnen.

== Plot ==
Forced to participate in a prison break, a convict on the run holes up at a roadside diner.

== Cast ==
- Cathy Downs as Hope Novak
- Paul Langton as Johnny Coulter
- Mischa Auer as Alec Shaw
- Roman Bohnen as Smitty
- Jane Weeks as Georgie
- Marion Kerby as Maggie Dillon
- Manuela Callejo as Louisa Shaw
- Don Harvey as Matt Gruber
- Charles Waldron, Jr. as Patrolman Jerry
- Rory Mallinson as Patrolman Mac

Uncredited (in order of appearance)

- Tommy Noonan as hold-up man
- Don Brodie as traveler at diner
