= Adria Locke Langley =

American novelist

Adria Locke Langley (1899 – August 14, 1983) was an American writer best known for her first novel, published in 1945, the best seller A Lion Is in the Streets based on the life of Huey Long. It was made into a film of the same name in 1953. She also was a fervent supporter of the repeal of Prohibition.

== Biography ==
Locke was born in Iowa, 1899, as the youngest of three children. When she was young her family moved to Stanton, Nebraska and that is where she grew up. Her father William Locke, was president of the Omaha livestock market and a Quaker. He had certain ideas of what a woman should be. Because of this Adria's grandfather, Thomas Glendenning, took over in teaching her what would later be a great social consciousness.

Adria was sent to Fremont College, in Nebraska, where she spent two years earning a teaching certificate. She was too young to qualify as a teacher under Nebraska State laws so she entered into Northwestern University. She was suspended for a séance.

Locke married while still in her teen years and got a divorce in 1929. With only about US$230 in her pocket to support her and her eight-month-old daughter she began to travel through the south selling merchandise control systems to department stores. She took up the habit of visiting the town hall meetings wherever she happened to be and became active in the movement for prohibition reform.
