= Three Desperate Men =

1951 film by Sam Newfield

- Directed by: Sam Newfield
- Screenplay by: Orville H. Hampton
- Story by: Orville H. Hampton
- Produced by: Sigmund Neufeld
- Starring: Preston Foster; Jim Davis; Virginia Grey; Kim Spalding; William Haade; Monte Blue; Sid Melton
- Cinematography: Jack Greenhalgh
- Edited by: Carl Pierson
- Music by: Albert Glasser
- Production company: Sigmund Neufeld Productions
- Distributed by: Lippert Pictures
- Release date: January 12, 1951 (United States)
- Running time: 71 minutes
- Country: United States
- Language: English

Three Desperate Men is a 1951 American Western film directed by Sam Newfield and starring Preston Foster, Jim Davis and Virginia Grey.

== Cast ==
- Preston Foster as Tom Denton
- Jim Davis as Fred Denton
- Virginia Grey as Laura Brock
- Kim Spalding as Matt Denton (credited as Ross Latimer)
- William Haade as Bill Devlin
- Monte Blue as Pete Coleman
- Sid Melton as Connore
- Rory Mallinson as Editor Larkin
- John Brown as Fairweather
- Margaret Seddon as Mrs. Denton
- House Peters Jr. as Dick Cable
- Joel Newfield as George Denton
- Anthony Jochim as Farmer
- Milton Kibbee as Cashier
