= Helen Mowery =

American actress (1922–2008)

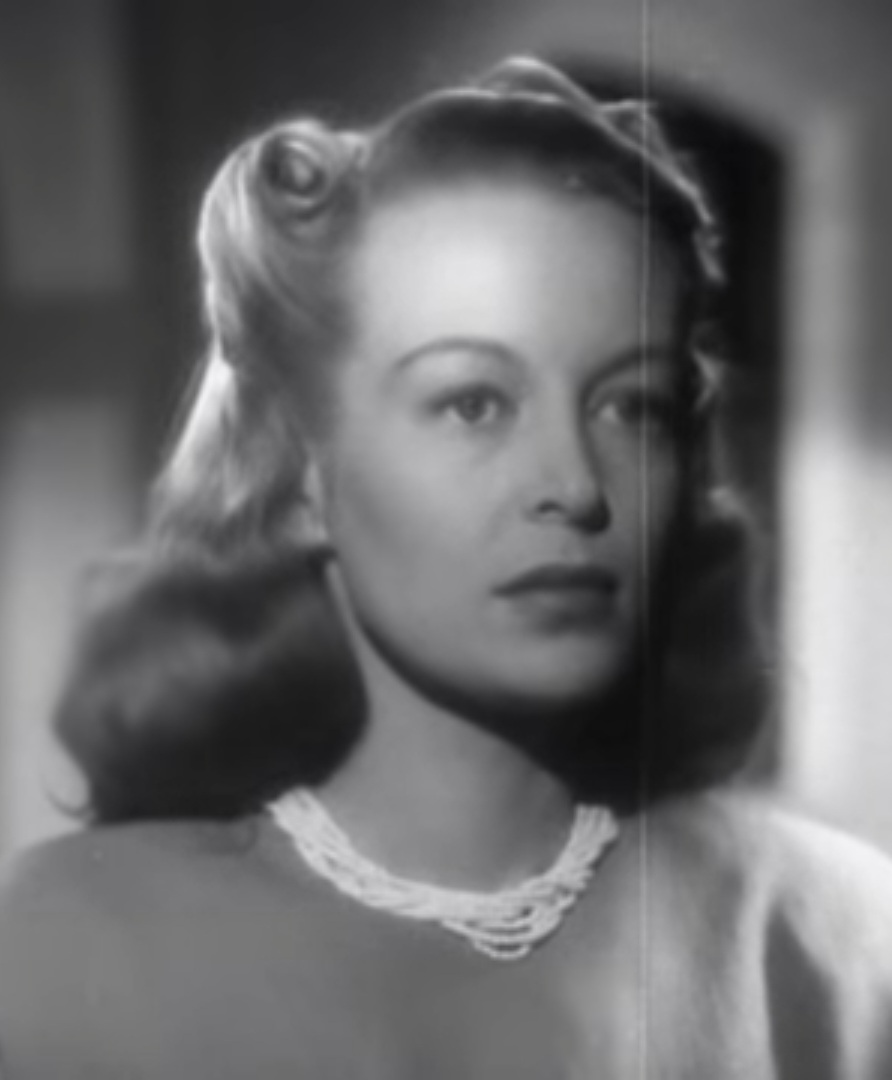
- Mowery in Women in the Night (1948)
- Born: Helen Emily Inkster; April 25, 1922; Casper, Wyoming, U.S.
- Died: July 14, 2008 (aged 86); Pasadena, California, U.S.
- Other name: Helen Webster
- Education: Pasadena Playhouse
- Alma mater: University of Wyoming (attended)
- Occupations: Model, Actress
- Years active: 1939–1961
- Spouses: Francis Mitchell Mowery (m. 1945; died 1953); Dale Murrell Webster (m. 1955; died 2002)

Helen Emily Inkster (April 25, 1922 – July 14, 2008) was a former Miss Wyoming who acted on the stage, in films, and on television.

== Early life ==
She was born Helen Emily Inkster in Casper, Wyoming. Her parents were George Lucas Inkster and Helen Countryman Inkster. Her father, originally from Omaha, Nebraska, was an engineer and World War 1 veteran. Her parents owned the Quality Grocery in Casper, which her mother managed while her father worked at the White Eagle Oil and Refinery plant. When Helen was five, her father was fatally scalded with hot water from the bubble tower of a pressure still at the refinery. Her mother sold the grocery store and took Helen to live on her grandmother's ranch in Lander, Wyoming. Seven months after the fatal accident, Helen's only sibling, a younger brother named George, was born in Lander.

Helen attended the local grade school in Lander while also learning to ride horses on the ranch, a skill that would come in useful during her later teens. The ranch was managed by her mother's much older brother, while her mother worked in a local store. At age fourteen Helen won a state-wide essay contest. For secondary education, she first attended Brownell Hall in Omaha, where her paternal grandparents lived. She later went to Cheyenne High School, where she played basketball and was selected to be "Governor of Wyoming" for "Leap Day", February 29, 1940.

== Miss Wyoming ==
While still in high school, Helen entered the Miss Wyoming contest, representing Lander. The contest was statewide but lacked a sponsor to commit for funding the winner to the subsequent Miss America contest. The state contest, held at the annual rodeo in Thermopolis, also had different judging criteria from the national competition. Entrants were judged not only on appearance and personality, but also on western costume and horsemanship. Helen persevered to win the title, and the $50 first prize, on September 4, 1939. When newspapers in surrounding states started printing a wire service photo and caption saluting the 17 year-old blue-eyed blonde as "Truly a girl of the Golden West", local boosters bestowed a free trip to the New York World's Fair to supplement the paltry cash prize.

As Miss Wyoming, Helen greeted Thomas E. Dewey when his campaign for the Republican presidential nomination visited Cheyenne in February 1940. Once again the wire services sent her photo out across the country, as she showed the aspiring politician the proper angle for wearing a "ten-gallon" hat.

After graduating from Cheyenne High School in June 1940, Helen was selected to be Pioneer Days Queen for Lander. That fall she entered the University of Wyoming, pledging Pi Beta Phi sorority. A campus beauty contest saw her selected by Earl Carroll as the most beautiful female student. Later that spring she took part in the campus Variety Show.

== Pasadena Playhouse ==
After her freshman year at Wyoming, Helen transferred to the Pasadena Playhouse School of Theater Arts, at the time an accredited college. By June 1942 she was taking part in professional productions, starting with between acts entertainment. She had an ensemble part in The College Widow in July 1942, and another in The Women during early December 1942.

Later that same month came her first feature role, as Ela Delahey in Charley's Aunt. The production, which also featured Raymond Burr, proved very popular and was held over in January 1943. While performing one night on the Playhouse's main stage, Helen suddenly felt faint; after delivering her lines she collapsed backstage where it was found one of the long needles from her 1890's costume had pierced her leg.

Helen's next role was in an original musical by Clare Kummer called The Lights of Duxbury. She then played in the comedy Poppa Is All during May 1943. This latter was a curiosity by Patterson Greene, with lines full of Pennsylvania-Dutch vernacular, which amused the audience so much "a dozen curtain calls were necessary". She reprised her role in Charley's Aunt with a company of Playhouse players who toured military bases in Southern California during Summer 1943. For late November 1943 she had a feature role in the West Coast premiere of Dark Eyes, which had just closed on Broadway.

== Columbia contract ==
Helen graduated from the Pasadena Playhouse in 1944. She was active in performing at the El Molino Avenue Theater thru 1945. In December 1945 columnist David Hanna reported that Helen Inkster had been signed to a contract at Columbia Pictures, and would shortly be making her first film with Richard Dix. Columnist Robert O. Foote followed up the next month by reporting Helen Inkster would now change her billing to Helen Mowery, to match her married name.

Columbia had loaned Mowery out to low-budget Producers Releasing Corporation (PRC) for her first two films. February 1946 found Mowery in Utah, to do location shooting at the Alta Ski Area for her second film, Avalanche. Her first film, now retitled to Mysterious Intruder, was released in March; the New York Daily News judged it an "exciting mystery picture". The same reviewer was less impressed with Avalanche, released in June, calling it "commonplace" and "unexciting". Mowery gave her first interview since Miss Wyoming days in July 1946, leaving the reporter nonplussed when she said her life had been uneventful so far. Later that month, PRC sent her and other actors on a publicity tour of five Missouri cities to help promote its recent film, Down Missouri Way, culminating with the film's premiere in St. Joseph, Missouri.

Satisfied Mowery had audience appeal, Columbia now put her in one of their own pictures, The Fighting Frontiersman. Because it was an established western series (Durango Kid), she took a distant third in billing to the series stars, Charles Starrett and Smiley Burnette. She was again loaned out to PRC for another western, Range Beyond the Blue, released in March 1947. The Professional Photographers Association chose her as "Miss Photogenic" at their annual meeting during July 1947. By this time her fifth picture, Key Witness, had been released by Columbia, in which she had a supporting role rather than the female lead.

Mowery was loaned out to an independent production company for Women in the Night, released in January 1948. Her next Columbia film was a small bit in the comedy The Mating of Millie. She was loaned out to Universal for Tap Roots, was used in bit parts for two big Columbia films released in 1949, Knock on Any Door and Jolson Sings Again, and had an ensemble part in Air Hostess. For 1950 she was loaned out to Paramount for Knock on Any Door and to Warner Brothers for Caged, both being bit parts.

Another Durango Kid picture, Across the Badlands, released in September 1950, brought her back to leading woman status. She was then loaned to 20th Century for a minor role in the award-winning All About Eve. Her film career finished up with Queen for a Day, released in May 1951. This was a United Artists release; it is not known whether Mowery was still under contract to Columbia at this point, though the studio did reuse archival footage of her from The Fighting Frontiersman in the last Durango Kid film, The Kid from Broken Gun (1952).

== Television ==
For nearly two years after making her last film, Mowery's performing career remained inactive. Six months after the death of her first husband, Mowery resumed acting, this time on the small screen. She performed on three anthology series during the Fall of 1953, including the Schlitz Playhouse of Stars. Anthologies remained her forte through 1954 and 1955, including episodes of Fireside Theatre and The Eddie Cantor Comedy Theatre.

Mowery had seven appearances on TV programs during 1956, including three for TV Reader's Digest and one for West Point. She continued doing anthologies thru 1957 and 1958, such as The O. Henry Playhouse, Ellery Queen, and Target. She also started guest appearing on shows with continuing casts, such as Perry Mason, M Squad and The Californians.

She wound down her performing career with guest appearances on Frontier Doctor, Sea Hunt, Men into Space, and a couple of episodes of Lock-Up for the years 1959 through 1961.

== Personal life ==
After being born in Casper, raised in Lander, schooled in Omaha, Cheyenne, and Laramie, Mowery settled in Pasadena and remained living there until her death, 67 years later. There is no public record of her having lived anywhere else since 1941.

Helen Inkster married actor and musician Mitchell Mowery on June 24, 1945. They had met at the Pasadena Playhouse, where he was Director of Music. A graduate of Rice Institute, he died of a heart attack in January 1953.

She married Dale Webster in Las Vegas, Nevada, on July 31, 1955. The Canadian-born Webster had been brought to the US in 1922 as a toddler, and was naturalized as a US citizen in 1947.

== Stage performances ==
Listed by year of first performance
Year	Play	Role	Venue	Notes
1942	The College Widow	Ensemble	Pasadena Playhouse	
1942	The Women		Pasadena Playhouse	
1942	Charley's Aunt	Ela Delahay	Pasadena Playhouse	Directed by George Phelps, starring Oliver B. Prickett, with Raymond Burr, Bruce Hall, Howard Graham, Margaret Eakin, Patricia Stevens, Larry Young, Helen Dilts, Nels Fitz-Gerald.
1943	The Lights of Duxbury		Pasadena Playhouse	Staged by Lenore Shanewise, with Maryedith Darrell, Fredrick Blanchard, Al Woods, William Weber, James Scott, and Teresa Lyons.
1943	Poppa Is All		Pasadena Playhouse	Staged by Onslow Stevens, who also starred; with Lenore Shanewise, Wallace Pindel, Kathryn Kenlie, Bernard Thomas.
1943	Charley's Aunt	Ela Delahay	Touring Company	Roadshow version for military bases had a slightly different cast. Starring Oliver B. Prickett, with Raymond Burr, Bruce Hall, Howard Graham, Margaret Eakin, Jean Osborne, Larry Young, Barbara Glantz, and Early Dawson.
1943	Dark Eyes	Helen Field	Pasadena Playhouse	Staged by Hale McKeen, with Barbara Glantz, Mary Greene, George Phelps, Maudie Prickett, Bernard Thomas, Ronald Leslie, Teresa Lyons, Napoleon Simpson.
1944	Murder in a Nunnery		Pasadena Playhouse	Performance known only from a later newspaper article about Helen Inkster at the Playhouse.

== Filmography ==
Film (by year of first release)
Year	Title	Role	Notes
1946	Mysterious Intruder (Note: The working title was Murder Is Unpredictable.)	Freda Hanson	Richard Dix starred, Mowery had feature billing. Her first film was judged a good mystery.
1946	Avalanche	Ann Watson	Bruce Cabot starred; Mowery shared second billing with Roscoe Karns in this weak mystery film.
1946	The Fighting Frontiersman (Note: In the UK this film was also known as The Golden Girl)	Dixie King	Mowery takes third billing to the stars in this Columbia "Durango Kid" western series entry.
1947	Range Beyond the Blue	Margie Rodgers	Mowery owns and operates a stagecoach line targeted by outlaws.
1947	Key Witness	Sally Guthrie	Her second picture for Columbia was a brief supporting role as murder victim.
1948	Women in the Night	Shiela Hallett	"B-Thriller" about six women in the last days of Axis-controlled Shanghai.
1948	The Mating of Millie		Uncredited. Mowery and Jean Willes play nightclubbers in this Columbia comedy.
1948	Tap Roots		Uncredited
1949	Knock on Any Door	Miss Holiday	Uncredited.
1949	Air Hostess	Midge	Uncredited.
1949	Jolson Sings Again	Script Girl	Uncredited.
1950	No Man of Her Own	Harriet Olsen	Uncredited.
1950	Caged	Woman	Uncredited.
1950	Across the Badlands	Eileen Carson	After a slew of bit parts, Mowery regained lead female billing with this Durango Kid film.
1950	All About Eve	Reporter	Mowery had a small credited role in this Best Film of 1950.
1951	Queen for a Day	Jan	Mowery was part of the central scenes that tied together three separate stories.
1960	The House Hunters	Mrs. Warren	Mowery plays wife of anxious home seller in this 16mm color short produced for NAR. With Edward Everett Horton, Douglas Kennedy, William Bakewell, John Bryant, Sally Fraser.

== Television performances ==
Television (in original broadcast order)
Year	Series	Episode	Role	Notes
1953	Chevron Theatre	Summer Night		
1953	The Pepsi-Cola Playhouse	Wait for Me Downstairs		
1953	Schlitz Playhouse	Part of the Game	Phyllis Kent	Mowery is wife of boxer (Peter Graves) blinded by a now remorseful ring opponent (Gig Young).
1954	Fireside Theatre	The Grass Is Greener		Series host Gene Raymond stars as a retired actor who hates TV.
1954	The George Burns and Gracie Allen Show	Shoplifter and the Missing Ruby Clip		
1954	I Led 3 Lives	Deportation	Comrade Elena Moretz	
1955	The Eddie Cantor Comedy Theatre	The Finer Points		Mowery guest stars as an etiquette teacher, with Robert Strauss, Jack LaRue, and Douglass Dumbrille.
1955	TV Reader's Digest	Six Hours of Surgery		
1955	TV Reader's Digest	Ordeal at Yuba Gap	Mrs. Chapman	
1956	Little Show (Note: This was a 15 minute anthology series, not uncommon in the early days of television)	Imp in the Bottle		Mowery, Dick Wessel, and Clark Howat star in adaptation of the classic R.L. Stevenson story.
1956	Science Fiction Theatre	The Long Sleep	Alma Willard	
1956	TV Reader's Digest	Miss Victoria	Clarissa	Judith Evelyn stars as heroic English woman.
1956	TV Reader's Digest	The Old, Old Story		Drama of teen couple who want to marry against adult wishes.
1956	TV Reader's Digest	Family Reunion USA	Mary Drew	Mowery stars as secretary who convinces people to help a Greek-born janitor.
1956	Dr. Christian	The Thin Line	Mrs. Appleby	
1956	West Point	His Highness and the Halfback	Barbara Neilson	Mowery plays wife of West Point officer (Chuck Connors).
1957	The O. Henry Playhouse	A Madison Square Arabian Knight	Mrs. Nelson	Boxing champ Chuck Nelson (Kenneth Tobey) loses his nerve until his manager (Morey Amsterdam) comes up with a charm.
1957	Ellery Queen	(Soft as a Cloud) (Note: This episode name is suspect; it may be just a slogan for the Culligan company that sponsored the show.)		Known only from a sponsor's newspaper ad that said Helen Mowery was starring.
1957	Perry Mason	The Case of the Sleepwalker's Niece	Lucille Mays	
1957	Dr. Christian	Old Man	Georgia	
1958	Target	Five Hours to Live		Mowery plays wife to Stephen McNally; their son (Charles Herbert) will die unless they accept offer from unknown person.
1958	The Californians	The Golden Bride	Melissa	Prospector (Edgar Buchanan) offers young woman (Mowery) her weight in gold if she'll marry him.
1958	The Silent Service	The Hawkbill's Revenge	Karina Scanland	
1958	M Squad	Prescription for Murder	Anita Renzik	Mowery is wife of brain surgeon (George Neise), kidnapped to prevent him operating on a detective.
1959	Frontier Doctor	Man to Man	Miss Miles	
1960	Men Into Space	Tankers in Space	Dorothy Alborg	
1960	Sea Hunt	Synthetic Hero	Susan Clayton	
1960	Lock-Up	Murder Is a Gamble	Eleanor Clayton	
1961	Lock-Up	Jennifer	Dorothy Vaughn	
