= Curfew Breakers =

- Directed by: Alex Wells
- Screenplay by: Alex Wells
- Starring: Paul Kelly; Cathy Downs
- Distributed by: Screen Guild Productions (US)
- Release date: 1957
- Country: United States
- Language: English

Curfew Breakers is a 1957 American film starring Paul Kelly and Cathy Downs. It was also known as Hooked and Narcotics Squad.
