= Range Beyond the Blue =

1947 film directed by Ray Taylor

- Theatrical release poster
- Directed by: Ray Taylor
- Screenplay by: Patricia Harper
- Produced by: Jerry Thomas
- Starring: Eddie Dean; Roscoe Ates; Helen Mowery; Bob Duncan; Ted Adams; Billy Hammond
- Cinematography: Robert E. Cline
- Edited by: Hugh Winn
- Music by: Walter Greene
- Production company: Producers Releasing Corporation
- Distributed by: Producers Releasing Corporation
- Release date: March 17, 1947
- Running time: 53 minutes
- Country: United States
- Language: English

Range Beyond the Blue is a 1947 American Western film directed by Ray Taylor and written by Patricia Harper. The film stars Eddie Dean, Roscoe Ates, Helen Mowery, Bob Duncan, Ted Adams and Billy Hammond. The film was released on March 17, 1947, by Producers Releasing Corporation.

== Plot ==
Outlaws are robbing a stage line, owned and operated by Margie Rodgers (Helen Mowery), whenever it carries gold. They aim to drive the value of the stage coach line down, then buy it cheaply through a front, and sell it for the true market price. Their plan is derailed by Eddie Dean and Soapy Jones (Roscoe Ates) who breakup one of the assaults. Eddie has Soapy take over the local sheriff's office when the sheriff is wounded. They battle the outlaw gang, and after some musical interludes, eventually break it up and expose the criminal plot.

== Cast ==
- Eddie Dean as Eddie Dean
- Roscoe Ates as Soapy Jones
- Helen Mowery as Margie Rodgers
- Bob Duncan as Lash Taggert
- Ted Adams as Henry Rodgers
- Billy Hammond as Kyle
- George Turner as Bragg
- Ted French as Sneezer
- Buster Slaven as Kirk Mason
- Steve Clark as Sheriff William Carter
- M.H. Richman as Jug Player
- Freddie Daniel as Musician
- Eddie Wallace as Musician
- J.D. Sumner as Musician
- Flash as Flash
