= Lost in the Stratosphere =

1934 film by Melville W. Brown

- Film poster
- Directed by: Melville W. Brown
- Written by: Albert DeMond (writer); Tristram Tupper (story)
- Produced by: William T. Lackey
- Starring: William Cagney; Edward J. Nugent; June Collyer
- Cinematography: Ira H. Morgan
- Edited by: Carl Pierson
- Production company: Monogram Pictures Corp.
- Distributed by: Monogram Pictures
- Release date: November 15, 1934
- Running time: 64 minutes
- Country: United States
- Language: English

Lost in the Stratosphere is a 1934 American aviation drama film directed by Melville W. Brown and starring William Cagney, Edward J. Nugent, and June Collyer. In one of his few roles in front of the cameras, Cagney was the lookalike younger brother of James Cagney.

== Plot ==
The full film

In the mid-1930s, in the early days of military aviation, an era of open cockpits and biplanes, two U.S. Army pilots, in a friendly rivalry, are always trying to get the best of each other.

2nd Lt. Tom Cooper (William Cagney) gets the nickname "Soapy", from his friend, 1st Lt. Richard "Dick" Wood, "Woody" (Edward J. Nugent). Tom's trademark gift to a female friend is an inscribed bar of soap. Tom finds out that "Ida Johnson", the girl he's been seeing while Dick has been off the base, is really Dick's fiancée, Evelyn Worthington (June Collyer). She introduced herself as Ida (Hattie McDaniel), using her maid's name as a lark. When Dick finds the tell-tale bar of soap from Tom, it's no joke to him, and two friends are at odds. Dick breaks off the engagement while Evelyn is torn between two loves.

The two pilots are picked to go on a dangerous balloon mission launched into the stratosphere, to evaluate high altitude flight capability. Before they get off the ground, the tense relationship has caused friction between the former friends. The generals keep reminding them that the equipment on board is more important than they are.

When a thunderstorm takes them thousands of miles off course, the two flyers are "lost in the stratosphere". It does not look like either of them will survive until Evelyn begs them to bail out. Dick, finally realizing Tom's innocence, knocks him out and throws him off the balloon, so he can come down safely by parachute, thereby jeopardizing his own chances of survival. After a crash landing in Quebec, from his hospital bed, Dick gives his blessing to Tom and Evelyn.

== Cast ==
- William Cagney as Lt. Tom "Soapy" Cooper
- Edward J. Nugent as Lt. Richard "Woody" Wood (credited as Eddie Nugent)
- June Collyer as Evelyn Worthington
- Edmund Breese as Col. Brooks
- Lona Andre as Sophie
- Frank McGlynn Sr. as Col. Worthington (credited as Frank McGlynn)
- Pauline Garon as Hilda Garon
- Matt McHugh as Matt O'Toole
- Russ Clark as Sgt. Enfield
- John Mack as Sgt. Baker (credited as Jack Mack)
- June Gittelson as Gretchen
- Hattie McDaniel as Ida Johnson

== Production ==
Principal photography on Lost in the Stratosphere began August 10, 1934, at RKO Pathé Studios.

Location shots also took place at Mines Field at Los Angeles playing the role of a military air base. Both stock and studio cinematography utilized a Stearman M-2 Speedmail and Alexander Eaglerock biplane.

Lost in the Stratosphere also uses news clips showing helium inflation of a balloon and the flight of the first Explorer USAAC balloon with the oversized spherical cabin reconstructed in the studio.

== Reception ==
Aviation film historian Christian Santoir reviewed Lost in the Stratosphere as a "period piece". He wrote: "Note, at the beginning of the film, the mention of the cancellation by Franklin D. Roosevelt of contracts for the carriage of mail by private companies, in February 1934. This decision proved disastrous, the pilots of the Army being unprepared to fly in all weathers. After the death of 12 military pilots, in 78 days of operations, the mail was returned to private carriers. Three-quarters of the film is concentrated on the love affairs of the two pilots who constitute the basis of this rather mediocre comedy. The balloon flight occupies only the last 10 minutes of the film."

== Home media ==
Lost in the Stratosphere is in the public domain and is available online at the Internet Archive. Released on DVD on August 23, 2005, the film is in widespread release due to its status as a public domain film.
