= Short Grass =

1950 film by Lesley Selander

- Directed by: Lesley Selander
- Written by: Thomas W. Blackburn
- Produced by: Scott R. Dunlap
- Starring: Rod Cameron, Cathy Downs and Johnny Mack Brown
- Cinematography: Harry Neumann
- Edited by: Otho Lovering
- Music by: Edward J. Kay
- Production company: Scott R. Dunlap Productions
- Distributed by: Allied Artists Pictures
- Release date: December 24, 1950
- Running time: 82 minutes
- Country: United States
- Language: English

Short Grass is a 1950 American Western film directed by Lesley Selander and starring Rod Cameron, Cathy Downs and Johnny Mack Brown.

== Cast ==
- Rod Cameron as Steve Llewellyn
- Cathy Downs as Sharon Lynch
- Johnny Mack Brown as Sheriff Ord Keown
- Raymond Walburn as Doctor McKenna
- Alan Hale Jr. as Chris Christofferson
- Morris Ankrum as Hal Fenton
- Jonathan Hale as Charlie Bissel
- Harry Woods as Sam Dreen
- Marlo Dwyer as Jennie Westfall
- Riley Hill as Randee Fenton
- Jeff York as Curley
- Stanley Andrews as Pete Lynch
- Jack Ingram as Jack
- Myron Healey as Les McCambridge
- Tristram Coffin as John Devore
- Rory Mallinson as Jim Westfall
- Felipe Turich as Manuel
- George J. Lewis as Diego
- Lee Tung Foo as Lin

== Bibliography ==
- Pitts, Michael R. Western Movies: A Guide to 5,105 Feature Films. McFarland, 2012.
