= Kentucky Rifle (film) =

1955 film

- Theatrical release poster
- Directed by: Carl K. Hittleman
- Screenplay by: Carl K. Hittleman; Lee Hewitt; Francis Chase Jr.
- Produced by: Carl K. Hittleman
- Starring: Chill Wills; Lance Fuller; Cathy Downs
- Cinematography: Paul Ivano
- Edited by: Hugh Winn
- Music by: Irving Gertz
- Production company: Howco
- Distributed by: Howco
- Release date: April 27, 1955
- Running time: 80 minutes
- Country: United States
- Language: English

Kentucky Rifle is a 1955 American Western movie starring a buckskin-clad Chill Wills and featuring Cathy Downs, Sterling Holloway and Henry Hull, involving smuggling a wagon filled with rifles past American Indian tribes already aware of the subterfuge. The picture was directed by Carl K. Hittleman.

== Plot ==
The film opens with a wagon train sequence. Jason Clay is a cowboy with several cases of Kentucky Rifles heading out to California when his wagon breaks down. Unfortunately, the axle is broken as well as the wheel, forcing Clay, his mentor Tobias, and others—Lonnie Settler, Luke, Preachur Bently, Amy Connors and her boyfriend Fostner and the Hays (with the wife Cordy expecting a child)--to scout for a piece of sturdy wood to mend their axle. In the process, they encounter some Indians.

The next day, Jason finds that Luke (who was forced to stay with the group against his will by the leader of the wagon train) has left them. He finds him killed by Comanche Indians. Fostner wants to trade Jason's Kentucky Rifles in order for safe passage but Jason disagrees, and when Jason and Amy begin forming a bond, Fostner becomes jealous. The group encounters more Indians with whom Jason battles. The settlers are proved to be dangerous when Tobias manages to shoot an Indian's feather off of Luke's grave, sparing them. The group manages to find wood and begin repairing the wagon. In the night, the group is again attacked by Indians, and Jason is wounded in the arm. Amy tends to his wounds and they kiss.

The group awakes the next morning and finds Fostner missing in action. Jason finds him captured by Indians, with whom he struck a deal—trade the guns in exchange for safe passage. Jason consults the group, and, against Tobias' and Amy's wishes, decides to give up his guns. Tobias and Jason return to the Indians, and arrange to get the guns. As they ride away, Fostner sees the Comanches prepare to fight and he realizes the settlers were being double-crossed. He rides to warn Jason and Tobias, and is wounded in the process. A band of Comanches appears and strikes the group twice but both times they are beaten back, thanks to the group's use of the Kentucky Rifle. A rogue Indian strikes again, and kills Fostner.

As the group leaves through the mountainous pass, they encounter more Comanches, but they do not fight as they know they have lost. The group safely makes it across the pass but Tobias is shot and killed by a rogue Comanche. He dies in Jason's arms, but not before telling him that "guns and girls do mix", as opposed to his saying earlier that "guns and girls do not mix", and to set up a shop to sell the Kentucky Rifles.

== Cast ==
- Chill Wills as Tobias Taylor
- Lance Fuller as Jason Clay
- Cathy Downs as Amy Connors
- Sterling Holloway as Lon Setter
- Henry Hull as Preacher Bently
- Jeanne Cagney as Cordy Hay
- Jess Barker as Daniel Foster
- John Pickard as Reuben Hay
- John Alvin as Luke Thomas
- I. Stanford Jolley as Jed Williams
- Rory Mallinson as Indian Chief
- George Keymas as Interpreter
- Clyde Houck as Clyde Thomas
- Alice Ralph as Mrs. Thomas
- Charles Soldani as Indian (uncredited)

== Production ==
Part of the film was shot on location in Palmdale, California.

== Release ==
The film premiered on April 27, 1955 in New Orleans. It opened in Owensboro, Kentucky on May 4, 1955.

== See also ==
- List of American films of 1955
