= A Lion Is in the Streets =

1953 film by Raoul Walsh

- Directed by: Raoul Walsh
- Screenplay by: Luther Davis
- Based on: A Lion Is in the Streets; 1945 novel by Adria Locke Langley
- Produced by: William Cagney
- Starring: James Cagney; Barbara Hale; Anne Francis; Warner Anderson; John McIntire; Jeanne Cagney; Lon Chaney Jr. Frank McHugh; Larry Keating; Onslow Stevens; James Millican
- Cinematography: Harry Stradling
- Edited by: George Amy
- Music by: Franz Waxman
- Color process: Technicolor
- Distributed by: Warner Bros. Pictures
- Release dates: September 23, 1953 (New York); October 2, 1953 (Los Angeles)
- Running time: 88 minutes
- Country: United States
- Language: English

A Lion Is in the Streets is a 1953 American political thriller drama film directed by Raoul Walsh and starring James Cagney, whose brother William was the producer and younger sister Jeanne was a member of the cast. The screenplay is based on a 1945 book by Adria Locke Langley.

The film has similarities to the 1949 film All the King's Men, adapted from the novel of the same name by Robert Penn Warren. Cagney plays a Southern politician loosely based on Huey Long.

== Plot ==
Charismatic roving peddler Hank Martin falls in love with schoolteacher Verity Wade and soon marries her. On their wedding day, he rents a ramshackle home from his upper-class lawyer friend Jules Bolduc. Hank gathers some of his many friends to fix the place, but Verity begins to realize that he is not as nice as he appears to be; while they do the work, he sees nothing wrong with stopping to read a law book. He confides to her that it is all a matter of manipulating people the right way.

Jules invites Hank and Verity to dine with him, but Hank quarrels with another guest, Robert L. Castleberry IV. He accuses Castleberry, the owner of a company that buys cotton, of shortchanging the poor farmers.

Verity accompanies Hank to the bayou. A young woman named Flamingo leaps into his arms, but when she learns that he is married, she tries to arrange for an alligator to rid her of her rival, and Verity is injured. After Hank sends Verity home to recover, Flamingo tracks Hank on the road. She overcomes his resistance and they start an affair.

Hank resolves to prove that Castleberry is cheating the farmers. When Hank proves that Castleberry is misrepresenting the weight of the cotton that he buys, one of Castleberry's men (a deputy) aims a rifle at one of Hank's followers, but Castleberry's man is shot and killed by farmer Jeb Brown.

To avoid inflammatory publicity, Castleberry ensures that Brown's murder trial is repeatedly postponed. Shadowy power broker Guy Polli offers to use his influence to have the case heard. When Castleberry's manager Samuel T. Beach shoots Brown, Hank persuades Brown to go to court anyway. Although Brown dies, Hank has time to persuade the jury to declare Brown innocent posthumously before the judge can adjourn and to tell the true story to the press.

The resulting publicity forces Castleberry to sell his company to Polli and enables Hank to run for governor. However, a rainstorm the day before the election prevents many of Hank's rural supporters from voting. In desperation, he visits Polli, who offers the votes of city precincts that he controls, but in return, he insists that Hank sign an affidavit stating that Beach was with him when Brown was shot, as the company would be destroyed if Beach were convicted. Hank reluctantly agrees.

Each candidate wins the same number of counties, but the state assembly that will break the tie is controlled by the incumbent. Rather than try again in four years, Hank urges his supporters to march on the capital as an armed mob. Just as they are starting, Jules arrives, stating that he has proof that Beach murdered Brown and that Hank knowingly signed the false affidavit in exchange for Polli's support. When Verity confirms that Hank was with her at the time of the killing, Brown's widow shoots Hank. As Hank is dying, he tells his wife that his supporters were smarter than he had thought they were.

== Cast ==
- James Cagney as Hank Martin
- Barbara Hale as Verity Wade Martin
- Anne Francis as Sunny-Lou "Flamingo" McManamee
- Warner Anderson as Jules Bolduc
- John McIntire as Jeb Brown
- Jeanne Cagney as Jennie Brown
- Lon Chaney Jr. as Spurge McManamee, Flamingo's father (as Lon Chaney)
- Frank McHugh as Frank Rector, a Castleberry worker and murder accomplice
- Larry Keating as Robert L. Castleberry IV
- Onslow Stevens as Guy Polli
- James Millican as Samuel T. Beach
- Mickey Simpson as Tim Beck, the blacksmith and Hank's supporter
- Sara Haden as Lula May McManamee, Flamingo's mother
- Ellen Corby as Singing Woman
- Burt Mustin as Swift (uncredited)

== Production ==
James Cagney purchased the rights to Adria Locke Langley's book in early 1945. At the time, the $250,000 that Cagney paid was second only to the amount paid for A. J. Cronin's The Green Years in 1944. Cagney denied that the story was a biography of Huey Long.

Jeanne Cagney played the role of Verity in a five-part radio adaptation of A Lion Is in the Streets as part of ABC Radio's Best Sellers program in September 1945.

The Cagney brothers reportedly disagreed about the choice of the original screenwriter and at one point sought to recruit Roark Bradford. In 1951, Charles Bennett was employed to work on the script.

The film production was scheduled to begin in December 1945 but was repeatedly delayed. With the move of Cagney Productions to General Service Studios in November 1946, the production of the film adaptation of Thorne Smith's The Stray Lamb was given priority, further delaying the A Lion Is in the Streets project. However, A Stray Lamb never materialized as a feature film.

In 1947, producer William Cagney launched a nationwide contest to find an "exotic" woman to play Flamingo in the film who most closely resembled an artist's conception of the character, with a $5,000 prize. However, Anne Francis was ultimately cast in the role.

In 1948, columnist Hedda Hopper speculated that the production had been delayed because of a threat issued by Huey Long's son that he would bring legal action against any studio that produced a film about his father's life. The release of Columbia's All the King's Men in 1949, a similar film based on Long's life, as well as the 1948 election of Long's brother Earl Long as governor of Louisiana, likely caused further delays.

Cagney Productions announced the casting of the film's first role by signing James Barton in June 1948. Barton did not appear in the eventual film. The brothers' first choice for the lead role was Paul Douglas, but James Cagney ultimately played the role himself. In June 1950, Gordon Douglas was announced as the director. In October 1952, Raoul Walsh was named director.

The film was originally intended to have musical components, with Cagney as a singing politician in the mold of former Texas governor W. Lee O'Daniel.

Production finally began in early December 1952 and filming wrapped in January 1953.

== Reception ==
In a contemporary review for The New York Times, critic Bosley Crowther called A Lion Is in the Streets "a headlong and dynamic drama" and wrote:

It has been eight years since James Cagney paid a quarter of a million dollars for the rights to Adria Locke Langley's lurid novel, 'A Lion Is in the Streets,' and announced that he would make a movie from it. In those eight years, a lot of wheels have turned and, according to reliable advices, Mr. Cagney has blown hot and cold. What's more, in that time, Robert Rossen has made a prize-winning film on the same theme—the theme of political demagoguery—which was known as 'All the King's Men." So it is surprising to see that Mr. Cagney has finally brought his picture along. It is also extremely gratifying. ... It offers the aggressive Mr. Cagney in one of his most colorful and meaningful roles. And, what's more, the theme of public weakness to rabblerousers is as timely as it was eight years ago."

Critic Edwin Schallert of the Los Angeles Times wrote: "'A Lion Is in the Streets' literally hurls its best scenes at the audience, and consequently its greatest advantage is the excitement it manages to evoke, even though this is never too prolonged. ... The picture will probably fall short of what might be anticipated by some observers, but in general it merits a good rating."

Jane Corby of the Brooklyn Eagle recounted the reaction of a theater audience on the day of the film's New York premiere: "Many of the Paramount patrons seemed to be under the impression that they were viewing a comedy ... laughing out loud at Cagney’s speech-making and his intermittent Southern accent and even finding funny the most serious moments of the film. Their attitude was understandable because, with its picturesque backwoods characters and disconnected methods of telling the story, the production often takes on a musical comedy air.”

Variety called the film "just an average drama."

== Radio adaptation ==
A Lion Is in the Streets was presented on the Grand Central Station program on March 16, 1946. Jeanne Cagney starred in the adaptation.
