= Quicksand (1950 film) =

1950 United Artists film noir directed by Irving Pichel

- Theatrical release poster
- Directed by: Irving Pichel
- Screenplay by: Robert Smith
- Produced by: Mort Briskin
- Starring: Mickey Rooney; Jeanne Cagney; Barbara Bates; Peter Lorre
- Cinematography: Lionel Lindon
- Edited by: Walter Thompson
- Music by: Louis Gruenberg
- Production company: Samuel H. Stiefel Productions
- Distributed by: United Artists
- Release date: March 24, 1950 (United States)
- Running time: 79 minutes
- Country: United States
- Language: English

Quicksand is a 1950 American film noir that stars Mickey Rooney and Peter Lorre and portrays a garage mechanic's descent into crime. It was directed by Irving Pichel.

The film provided Rooney with an opportunity to play against type, performing in a role starkly different from his earlier role as the innocent "nice guy" in MGM's popular Andy Hardy film series. Critical reception was mixed in 1950, but has warmed somewhat over time and Quicksand has been described as one of Rooney's best performances.

== Plot ==
Mickey Rooney as Dan Brady

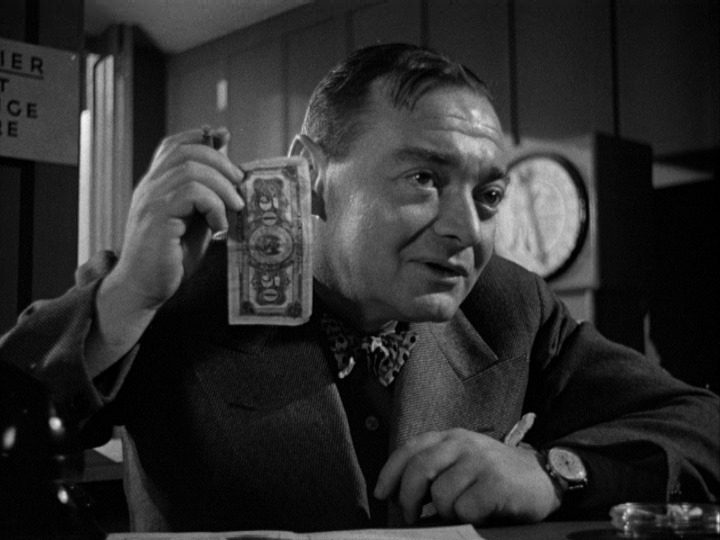
Peter Lorre as Nick Dramoshag

Dan Brady (Mickey Rooney), a young auto mechanic in California, "borrows" $20 ($268 today) from the cash register at his job to pay for a date with blonde femme fatale Vera Novak (Jeanne Cagney), who works at a nearby diner.

In a scheme to return the pilfered $20, Dan decides to pay only one dollar as a down payment at a jewelry store for a $100 wristwatch ($1,338 today), a deal that requires him to sign a sales contract to buy the watch over time with regular installment payments. He then promptly goes to a pawnshop where he hocks the watch for $30 cash ($401 today), using most of that money to cover the missing funds at the garage. However, the next day Dan is tracked down by an investigator who informs him that he has violated the installment contract by pawning a watch he does not legally own. The investigator tells him that if he does not pay the jewelry store the full $100 for the watch within 24 hours, he will be charged with grand larceny, a crime punishable by three years in state prison. After unsuccessfully applying for a payday loan and attempting to use his car as collateral for another loan, a desperate Dan resorts to mugging a tipsy bar patron known for carrying large amounts of cash.

Nick Dramoshag (Peter Lorre), the seedy owner of a penny arcade on Santa Monica Pier and a man who has had his own intimate history with Vera, discovers evidence of Dan's mugging. He blackmails the young mechanic, demanding a car from Dan's job in exchange for his silence. Dan steals the car, which he trades for the evidence from Dramoshag. Dan's morally lacking boss Oren Mackey (Art Smith) soon confronts Dan and says he knows that he stole the car. Mackey demands the return of the vehicle or $3,000 in cash ($40,145 today), or he will go to the police.

Dan and Vera steal the month-end receipts from Dramoshag's arcade, obtaining $3,610 ($48,308 today). Dan expects to use the money to pay Mackey. Vera, however, feels entitled to half the money, so she buys herself a mink coat for $1,800 ($24,087 today). Once he learns what she has done, a furious Dan returns to the garage alone, where he offers Mackey $1,800 to settle their arrangement. Mackey takes the money, but picks up the phone to call the police. After Mackey pulls a gun, the two men struggle and Dan strangles his boss with the phone cord. Certain that the man is dead, Dan takes Mackey’s gun and returns to Vera to inform her of what he has done. He asks her to flee with him to Texas. She will not go, insisting that the authorities have no evidence against her. Disgusted by Vera's self-serving behavior, Dan storms out.

Outside Vera's apartment, Dan's still-loyal but unappreciated former girlfriend Helen (Barbara Bates) waits in his car to talk with him. She had seen him earlier on the street and realized then that he was in trouble. She now decides to accompany Dan as they drive out of town to avoid his anticipated arrest for murder. After his car breaks down, Dan carjacks a sedan, which happens to be driven by a sympathetic lawyer (Taylor Holmes). Dan subsequently gets out of that car when they arrive at Santa Monica Pier. There, he tells Helen to remain with the lawyer as he carries out his new plan to escape to Mexico on a friend's charter boat. He also assures Helen that he will send for her once he is safely resettled across the border. A few minutes later, the lawyer and Helen hear over the sedan's radio a news report that Mackey survived his injuries. They now drive back to the pier to find Dan and inform him that he is not a murderer. Meanwhile, police officers spot Dan there, wound him by gunfire in an ensuing chase, and take him into custody. Helen comforts Dan and vows to wait for him until he is released from prison.

== Cast ==
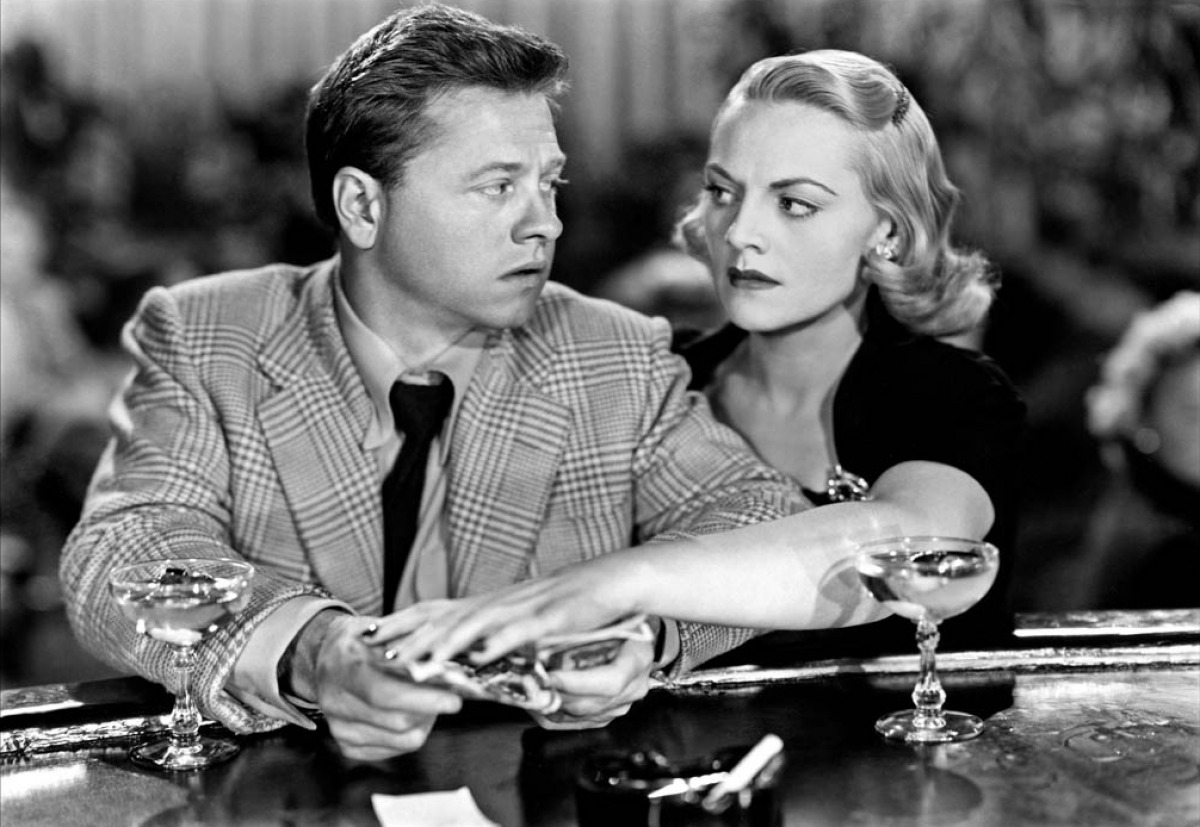
Dan (Mickey Rooney) with Vera (Jeanne Cagney)

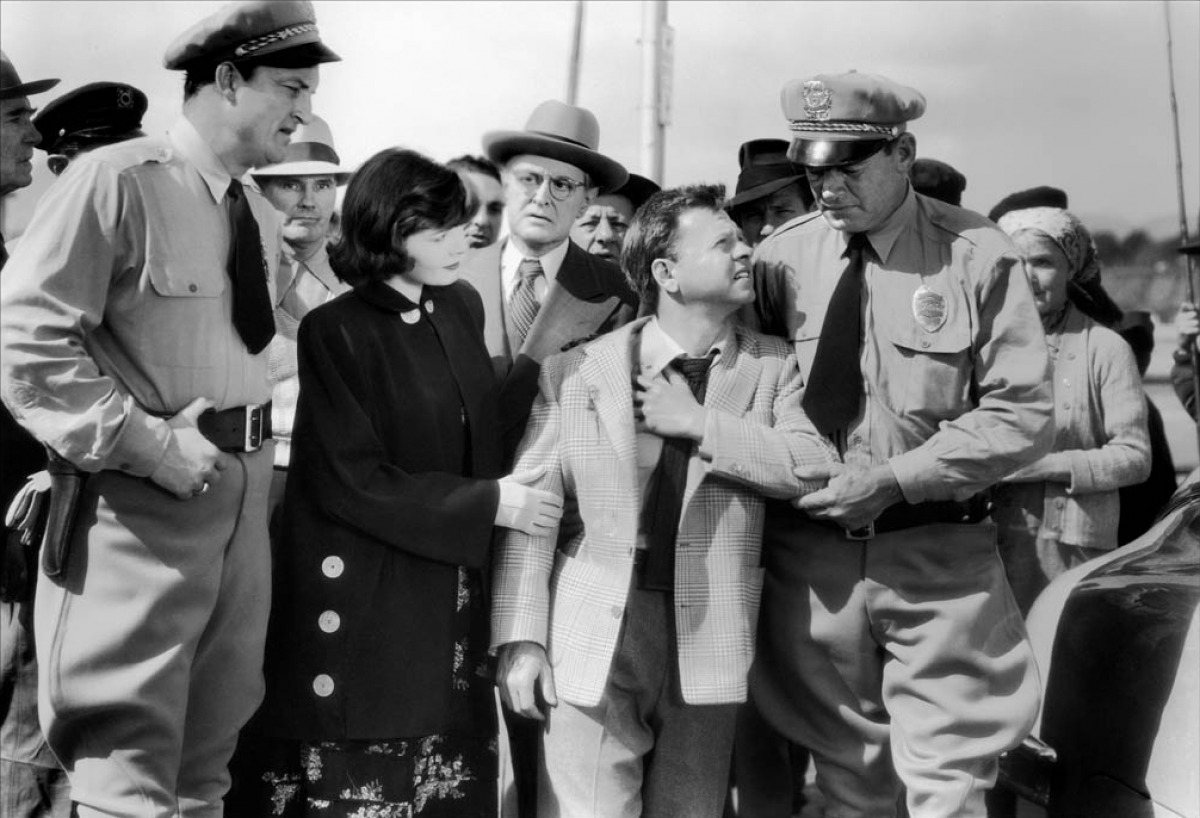
Helen (Barbara Bates) with Dan when captured by police; behind them, wearing glasses, is the lawyer Harvey (Taylor Holmes)

- Mickey Rooney as Dan
- Jeanne Cagney as Vera
- Barbara Bates as Helen
- Peter Lorre as Nick
- Taylor Holmes as Harvey
- Art Smith as Mackey
- Red Nichols as himself
- Wally Cassell as Chuck
- Richard Lane as Lt. Nelson
- Patsy O'Connor as Millie
- John Gallaudet as Moriarity
- Minerva Urecal as Landlady
- Sidney Marion as Shorty
- Jimmie Dodd as Buzz (as Jimmy Dodd)
- Lester Dorr as Baldy
- Kitty O'Neil as Madame Zaronga
- Jack Elam (uncredited speaking role as bar patron)

== Production ==
Rooney co-financed Quicksand with Peter Lorre, but their shares of the profits were reportedly left unpaid by a third partner. Most of the film was shot on location in Santa Monica, California, with exterior scenes at the old Santa Monica Pier. Jazz cornetist Red Nichols with His Five Pennies group are seen and heard in a nightclub scene.

Peter Lorre's fellow actors in Quicksand were impressed with his performance on the set. Commenting on the film in a later interview, Jeanne Cagney observed the following about Lorre: "He did it with all his might. Even though the picture was not a top drawer film he still approached it as if it were the 'A' picture of all 'A' pictures."

Quicksand was Pichel's last film shortly before he was included in the Hollywood blacklist, which was instituted by the House Un-American Activities Committee to block screenwriters with suspected Communist affiliation from obtaining employment in mainstream Hollywood productions. It was suspected but not definitively proven at the time of the blacklist if Pichel was a communist or sympathizer, but after his 1954 death a friend of the director confirmed that Pichel had in fact been a member of the American Communist Party. Pichel's final films were produced outside the United States.

== Reception ==
Newspaper and trade publication reviews of the film in 1950 were mixed, with many being either mildly complimentary or negative. The Los Angeles Times is one of the major newspapers that year that gives the film a generally positive review. While the newspaper deems the film's plot as "predictable", it still assures moviegoers that it is "one that grips you every minute". The Los Angeles Times also draws particular attention to the performances of supporting cast and to subtleties in Rooney's portrayal of Dan Brady:

Without undue gestures or mugging, Mickey gets over his emotions and thoughts chiefly through his eyes....Jeanne Cagney plays the role of the girl who can only be described by a five-letter word, and makes the part vivid. Peter Lorre is duly sinister, and Barbara Bates as a "patient Griselda" sweetheart will please you even if you do feel at moments like hitting her one for being so dog-devoted to an indifferent Mickey.

Herm Shoenfeld of Variety, the entertainment industry's most widely read trade paper in 1950, characterizes Quicksand as "an okay meller with a crime-does-not-pay moral" and with a screenplay that is "fast, straightforward". He does, though, criticize the plot as having "several implausible stretches" but adds that the film's "overall speed sustains interest throughout." Shoenfeld also rates Rooney's performance as merely adequate. "As a dramatic actor", he writes, "Rooney is competent but fails to show wide range." Mae Tinée, a reviewer for the Chicago Daily Tribune also had a mixed reaction to the crime drama. Headlining her assessment "Rooney Is Cast as a Criminal in 'Quicksand'", she describes the film as "unpretentious" and expresses a decided preference for the storyline's first half when compared to its "contrived" latter half:

The early scenes are brisk and believable, but about midway the action becomes obviously contrived, and the happy ending requires much strenuous juggling which is entirely unconvincing. Rooney is well suited to his role and handles it in capable fashion, but Miss Cagney is almost too slickly sinister. Peter Lorre does well in his brief appearances. The entire production is handled with accent on realism, which does not, however, overcome the patness of the plotting.

The New York Times in its review is far less kind to the film, calling it an "uninspired melodrama" that "hammers home several unoriginal ideas in a fairly stodgy fashion." "Mr. Rooney", asserts the Times, "sums it all up when he plaintively remarks, 'Boy, am I in a mess.'" The New York Herald Tribune, agreeing with its cross-town news competitor, refers to the film as a "dreary screen saga" and judges Rooney "equally dreary in the acting department." The newspaper then describes Rooney’s character Dan as a "thoroughly unsavory character, poorly delineated by script-writer Robert Smith".

=== Modern reception ===
Decades after its release, Quicksand continues to draw the attention of film historians and movie fans, especially among those with a special interest in film noir. In his 2013 review, Bruce Eder for AllMovie notes that Rooney "gives what many consider to be the best performance of his career", and he considers the film to be "one of the more fascinating social documents of its era." Richard Mellor, in an earlier review for the UK-based review site Eye For Film, focused in part on the film's inherent attraction to audiences, to the appeal of being witnesses to the downward spiral of "everyman Dan Brady". It is a descent in Mellor's view that "is an enjoyable, if cloyingly predictable, fall from grace." He therefore questions in his 2009 review the validity of attaching broader issues or more complex interpretations to the film decades after its initial screening. In his opinion the film's message is quite simple and imparts a timeless, universal lesson. "It's doubtful", he contends, "whether 'Quicksand' reflects the social uncertainty of the period, as some have claimed, but it certain[ly] proves the danger that slick operators offer to a gullible dufus like Dan."
