= Queen for a Day =

American radio and television reality game show

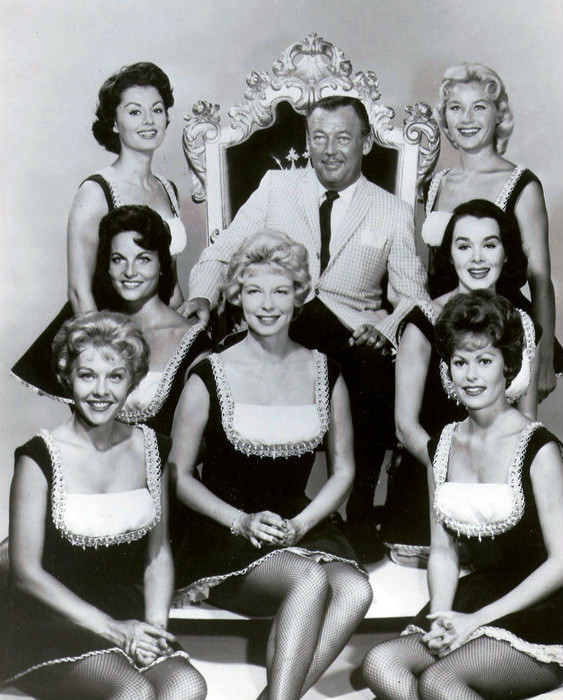
- Host Jack Bailey poses for a promotional photo.
- Created by: John Masterson
- Presented by: Ken Murray; Jack Bailey; Dick Curtis; Mo'Nique
- Announcer: Gene Baker; John Harlan
- Country of origin: United States
- Original language: English

Production
- Producer: John Masterson
- Running time: 30 minutes, later 45
- Production companies: John Masterson Productions (1945–64); The Raymond R. Morgan Company (1956–58); Queen for a Day, Inc. (1958–64); Metromedia (1969–70); The Gurin Company (2004)

Original release
- Network: Mutual (radio); NBC (1956–60); ABC (1960–64); Syndicated (1969–70); Lifetime (2004 Special)
- Release: April 30, 1945 – May 27, 2004

Queen for a Day is an American radio and television game show that helped to usher in American listeners' and viewers' fascination with big-prize giveaway shows. Queen for a Day originated on the Mutual Radio Network on April 30, 1945, in New York City before moving to Los Angeles a few months later and ran until 1957. The show then ran on NBC Television from 1956 to 1960 and on ABC Television from 1960 to 1964.

The show became popular enough that NBC increased its running time from 30 to 45 minutes to sell more commercials, at a then-premium rate of $4,000 per minute.

== Format ==
The show opened with host Jack Bailey asking the audience—mostly women—"Would YOU like to be Queen for a day?" After this, the contestants were introduced and interviewed, one at a time, with commercials and fashion commentary interspersed in between.

Each contestant was asked to talk about the recent financial and emotional hard times she had been through. The interview would climax with Bailey asking the contestant what she needed most and why she wanted to win the title of Queen for a Day. Often the request was for medical care or therapeutic equipment to help a chronically ill child, or might be for a hearing aid, a new washing machine, or a refrigerator. Many women broke down sobbing as they described their plights.

The winning contestant was selected by the audience using an applause meter; the harsher the contestant's situation, the likelier the studio audience was to ring the applause meter's highest level. The winner, to the musical accompaniment of "Pomp and Circumstance", would be draped in a sable-trimmed red velvet robe, given a glittering jeweled crown to wear, placed on a velvet-upholstered throne, and handed a dozen long-stemmed roses to hold while her list of prizes was announced.

The prizes began with the help the woman had requested, and included a variety of extras, many of which were donated by sponsoring companies, such as a vacation trip, a night on the town with her husband, silver-plated flatware, an array of kitchen appliances, or a selection of fashion clothing. The losing contestants were each given smaller prizes.

Bailey's trademark sign-off was: "This is Jack Bailey, wishing we could make every woman a queen, for every single day!"

== Cast ==
- Jack Bailey as Himself
- Jeanne Cagney as Herself
- Gene Baker as Announcer
- Fort Pearson as Announcer
- John Harlan as Announcer
- Maxine Reeves as Head Model (1945–1964)
- Carol Silversparre as Model (1945–1964)
- Jann Darlyn as Model
- Suzanne Alexander as Model (1953–1964)
- Jolene Brand as Model
- Pat Sheehan as Model (1952–1953)
- Dorene Georgeson as Model
- Beverly Adams as Model
- Beverly Christensen as Model
- Doris Gildart as Model
- Naida Curtis as Model (1953–1954)
- Barbara Luke as Model
- Suzanne Ames as Model
- Beverly Lyon as Model
- Millicent Deming as Model
- Patricia Nanton as Model (1953)
- Virginia Bingman as Model
- Darlene Stuart (née Coats) as Model
- Jackie Kenley as Model
- Mary Ellen Gleason as Model
- Josephine Burris as Model (1953)
- Dolores Fuller as Model
- Marilyn Burtis as Model (1953–1964)
- Jewell Glasser as Model
- Mary Lou Morgan as Model
- Lois Schaumburg (née Kiecker) as Model
- Gloria Moore (née Crawford) as Model (1952–1954)
- Eunice Hadley as Model
- Rosenell "Revell" Krech (née Farrell) as Model
- Nicole De Meyer as Model
- Katherine "Kathy" Taylor (née Cook) as Head Model
- Marilyn Hare as Model
- Mary Tobin as Model (1955)
- Cathie Righter as Model
- Jean Spangler as Model
- Wendy Waldron as Model
- Marie Gray as Model
- Lisa Davis as Model
- Lesley Alexander as Model
- Jo Anne Saravolatz as Model
- Lois Rayman as Model
- Diane Mills as Model (1964)
- Marilyn Crooker as Model
- Barbara Lyon (née Miller) as Model
- Sharon Overman (née Moss) as Model
- Paulette Lollar as Model
- Crystal Reeves as Head Model
- June Lyden as Model
- June Blanchard as Model (1949–1950)
- Lee Whitney as Model (1953)
- Anna-Lisa as Model
- Linda Waddle as Model (1960)
- Barbara Stagge as Model (1960)
- Sally Sublette as Model (1960)
- Joan Foellger as Model (1960)
- Mary Beth Hempfling as Model (1960)
- Dee Sandvig as Model (1963)
- June Kirby as Model
- Eve Bernhardt as Model
- Wendy Wilde as Model
- Marilyn Hanold as Model

== Past winners ==
- Norma Jean Mielicke
- Roberta Joann Siewert
- Rosemary Deegan
- Sophia Costarella
- Helen Largent
- Mary Sue Wells
- Juanita DeLee Parent
- Margaret Pond
- Erma Baker
- Ann Graham Everett
- Peggy Ann McKay
- Viola Layne
- Eva Jean Wilcox
- Marianne Hogue
- Shirley Dykema
- Mary Bartley
- June Stauffer
- Lesley Spurgeon
- Virginia Hunt Newman
- Marie Lanthripe
- Sue Witt
- Doris Brockelbank
- Wilhelmina Van Son
- Margaret Smith
- Gurtrude Pagne
- Margaret Duval
- Mary Wilks
- John Martin
- Edith Manvell
- Harvey Spittell
- Doris Jayne Casey
- Josephine Keefe
- Gloria Mackson
- Mary Lou Wentworth
- Mary Lay
- Marilyn Dawson
- Marjorie DeSmet
- Norma Jean Kowalik
- Constance Millinowski
- Fannie Baskett
- Thelma Chaves

== Reception ==
The show was not without its critics for exploiting people's hardships for profit. Veteran television writer Mark Evanier has called the program "one of the most ghastly shows ever produced." He further described it as "tasteless, demeaning to women, demeaning to anyone who watched it, cheap, insulting and utterly degrading to the human spirit."

== Broadcast history ==
=== Radio ===
Ken Murray hosted the original radio version of the show on the Mutual–Don Lee Radio Network. When the series began, in New York City on April 30, 1945, it was titled Queen for Today. A few months later, the show moved to Hollywood and acquired the more familiar title Queen for a Day with Jack Bailey, a former vaudeville musician and World's Fair barker, as host. The show aired five days a week during the daytime.

=== Film ===
In 1951, a fictional comedy-drama film adaptation of the show was released by United Artists. Titled Queen for a Day, it purported to be a behind-the-scenes look at the show while at the same time spoofing the show's basic premise. The movie starred Bailey as the host and featured Darren McGavin, Phyllis Avery, and Leonard Nimoy, among others.

=== Television ===
Bailey stayed on as host as Queen for a Day jumped from radio to television. With the addition of a visual component, the fashion aspect of the show expanded and each episode featured three to five young women modelling the upscale apparel that would be given away to contestants. Other visual stunts, such as a circus-themed episode featuring ponies and clowns from Ringling Brothers Barnum and Bailey Circus, helped bring the show into the television era. Through all of these changes, however, Bailey remained the interviewer who, over and over again, brought the contestants—and the live female audience—to tears. The first televised episode, a rebroadcast of an earlier radio episode, featured Pearl Stevens of Claremont, California. Models on the series included Maxine Reeves, Carol Silversparre, Jann Darlyn, Suzanne Alexander, Pat Sheehan, Patricia Nanton, and Jolene Brand.

Live remote broadcasts and unscripted interviews added to the show's believability. One of the show's telecast locations was the Earl Carroll Theatre on Sunset Blvd. in Hollywood, renamed the Moulin Rouge in 1953. During each episode, the cameras panned over the audience as the women waved and cheered.

From 1948 through 1955, the show was simulcast on radio. It began airing on Los Angeles television on January 7, 1952, although TV listings reveal that the show was seen as early as 1947 on the local Don Lee station channel 2.

NBC picked up the show for national broadcast from January 3, 1956 to September 2, 1960, and aired it live across the nation (1:30 PST in Los Angeles and 4:30 EST in New York). It proved to be popular and Bailey and the program were featured on the cover of TV Guide for the week of June 22–28, 1957.

ABC broadcast the series nationally from September 5, 1960, until the end of the run on October 2, 1964.

=== Revivals ===
On September 8, 1969, after a five-year hiatus, a new version of the show debuted in syndication with Dick Curtis as host. The premise remained largely the same; however, this version only ran until September 18, 1970. Viewers turned away from the format when it was revealed that, unlike the radio and earlier television versions, the new show was rigged and the "winners" were apparently paid actresses chosen to "win" the prizes prior to the start of each taping.

In 1987, Barry & Enright Productions in conjunction with Fries Distribution attempted to revive Queen for a Day with Monty Hall as host for the fall of 1988 but with no success.

On May 27, 2004 (originally May 24, 2004), after being off the air for more than 34 years, it was revived as a one-time special airing on cable network Lifetime with actress and comedian Mo'Nique as host. Judges for this version were Joely Fisher, Meshach Taylor, and Dayna Devon. The only difference between this version and the original was that the winner was not determined by audience applause.

=== Musical ===
In 2012, a musical was made based on the show called Queen for a Day: The Musical, starring Alan Thicke as Jack Bailey. The outspoken and strong-willed Claribel Anderson (played by Blythe Wilson) finds herself along with fellow waitress Lana Beutler (played by Marisa McIntyre) at the glamorous Moulin Rouge Theatre, where the hit show tapes daily. Here the girls meet the quirky and charismatic host Jack Bailey and a colorful cast of Hollywood players who are ready and willing to build the Queen for a Day dream. Bailey sees the women, listens to many stories, dries many tears—but only one can be queen. Eventually Claribel lands as a contestant on the show. Her 15 minutes of fame send her down a road of self-discovery, forcing her to question her dream of being the perfect 50's housewife.

== International versions ==
=== Australia ===
An Australian version aired in Melbourne on station HSV-7 from 1960 to 1962.

=== Brazil ===
The Brazilian version was hosted by Silvio Santos and aired on The Globo in 1972 under the title Boa Noite, Cinderella (Good Night/Evening, Cinderella). This version awarded gifts for children (mainly little girls) instead of housewives. Years later, when the channel changed from TVS to SBT, it aired the program in the afternoons, dropping "Good Night" in its title and renaming it Cinderella, until it was cancelled in 1987.

=== Spanish-speaking countries ===
In Mexico, an Aztec TV version, also called Reina por un día (Queen for One Day) was produced. First aired in 2011, it was originally hosted by Ingrid Coranado and then by Raquel Bigorra.

In the winter of 2011, a Spanish-language revival was hosted by Tomás Ramos (better known as The Red Shadow animator), aired on Univision in Puerto Rico under the name Reina por un día. The panel consisted of Amos Morals and Moraima Oyola.

In Spain, the show was also called Reina por un día (Queen for One Day), hosted by José Luis Barcelona and Mario Cabré. It was aired on Televisión Española from 1964 until 1966, mostly on Sunday afternoons.

== Ownership rights ==
In 2008, RDF USA obtained the rights to the show with plans to pitch an update version to broadcast and cable networks.

Seven episodes are currently licensed by the Peter Rogers Organization.

== Similar shows ==
Queen for a Day shared much in common with two other shows of its era, Strike It Rich (on radio and television from 1947 to 1958) and It Could Be You (on television from 1956 to 1961).

A third similar show was On Your Way (on the DuMont Television Network and ABC from 1953 to 1954), which also used contestants with unfortunate stories, giving them transportation tickets as a reward for correct answers to quiz questions.

The major difference between Queen for a Day and these other "sympathy shows" was that they asked their poverty-stricken contestants to win prizes within a conventional quiz show format, with the winner essentially earning the prizes through his or her cleverness. Queen for a Day, on the other hand, dispensed with the quiz-show format entirely: all the contestants were women, and the only way a woman could win was by sincerely touching the heart-strings of the live female audience, who would then award her the greatest volume on the "applause meter." Prizes were sponsored by industry leaders in appliances, home goods and, apparel, such as Spiegel, who offered each guest a credit allowance to spend from their catalog of more than 30,000 items.

== Episode status ==
Recordings of the series are believed to have been destroyed, as per network practices of the era.

Twelve episodes are held at the UCLA Film and Television Archive, including two from the Don Lee network era: the August 21, 1953, radio episode simulcast on television in Los Angeles and the July 4, 1955, show with Adolphe Menjou guest-hosting to crown a king instead of a queen (as was done about once or twice a year). The latest episode held at the archive is from July 13, 1964, near the end of the show's run on ABC.

Two kinescoped episodes from 1956 exist in the J. Fred & Leslie W. MacDonald Collection of the Library of Congress. These include a 45-minute installment from February 2, 1956, and a half-hour installment from October 25, 1956.

Fourteen episodes are held at The Paley Center in Beverly Hills, California.

Old Time Radio Catalog has four episodes -in audio format only- archived, dated August 10, 1945, February 14, 1948, February 13, 1950, and May 23, 1952.

In 2005, First Look Media released a three-disc DVD set of seven episodes transferred from their original kinescope elements plus rare footage of an additional five episodes; the total runtime is 210 minutes.

== See also ==
- Strike It Rich (1950s TV series)
- On Your Way
- United States in the 1950s
