= Rim of the Canyon =

1949 film by John English

- Theatrical release poster
- Directed by: John English
- Screenplay by: John K. Butler
- Based on: Phantom .45's Talk Loud (short story) by Joseph Chadwick
- Produced by: Armand Schaefer; Gene Autry
- Starring: Gene Autry; Nan Leslie; Thurston Hall
- Cinematography: William Bradford
- Edited by: Aaron Stell
- Music by: Paul Mertz (supervisor)
- Distributed by: Columbia Pictures
- Release date: August 30, 1949 (U.S.)
- Running time: 70 minutes
- Country: United States
- Language: English

Rim of the Canyon is a 1949 American Western film directed by John English and starring and co-produced by Gene Autry; featuring Nan Leslie, and Thurston Hall. Based on the short story Phantom .45's Talk Loud by Joseph Chadwick, the film is about a horse stolen by escaped convicts and the cowboy who pursues them to a ghost town inhabited by a ghost.

== Plot ==
After an accident during a stagecoach race, Gene Autry wanders into a ghost town where he meets local school teacher Ruth Lambert. Lambert claims to be able to speak with the ghost of Big Tim Hanlon, a wealthy businessman who used to live in the town before it was abandoned. The two end up stranded for the night after their horse disappears. Meanwhile, a group of outlaws, who have stolen Autry's horse Champion, shows up looking for stolen money that is supposed to have been hidden in the town twenty years ago. Big Tim Hanlon reveals himself to Autry and Lambert, explaining how Autry's father apprehended the outlaws years ago, but was unable to recover the stolen money. Aided by an old prospector, the group is able to free Champion and stop the outlaws, but the ghost town is destroyed by fire in the ensuing fight. Hanlon disappears into the night while Autry and Lambert head back to civilization.

== Cast ==
- Gene Autry as Gene Autry / Marshal Steve Autry
- Champion as Champ, Gene's horse
- Nan Leslie as Ruth Lambert
- Thurston Hall as Big Tim Hanlon
- Clem Bevans as Loco John
- Walter Sande as Jake Fargo
- Jock Mahoney as Pete Reagan
- Francis McDonald as Charlie Lewis
- Alan Hale Jr. as Matt Kimbrough

== Production ==
=== Filming and budget ===
Rim of the Canyon was filmed December 6–20, 1948. The film had an operating budget of $46,784 (equal to $633,056 today).

=== Filming locations ===
- Vasquez Rocks, Vasquez Rocks Natural Area Park, 10700 W. Escondido Canyon Rd., Agua Dulce, California, USA
- Corriganville Movie Ranch, Simi Valley, California, USA

=== Soundtracks ===
- "You're the Only Star in My Blue Heaven" (Gene Autry) by Gene Autry
- "Rim of the Canyon" (Hy Heath, Johnny Lange) by Gene Autry
