= Cathy Downs =

American actress (1926–1976)

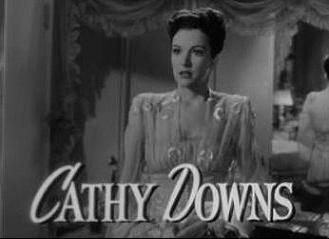
- in The Dark Corner (1946)
- Born: Catherine N. Downs; March 3, 1926; Port Jefferson, New York, U.S.
- Died: December 8, 1976 (aged 50); Los Angeles, California, U.S.
- Resting place: Woodlawn Memorial Cemetery, Santa Monica, California, U.S.
- Occupation: Actress
- Years active: 1945–1965
- Spouses: Robert Brunson (m. 1956; div. 1963) Joe Kirkwood, Jr. (m. 1949; div. 1955)

Catherine N. Downs (March 3, 1926 – December 8, 1976) was an American film actress.

== Biography ==
Downs was born in Port Jefferson, New York. She was the daughter of James Nelson Downs and Edna Elizabeth Newman.

A model for the Walter Thornton Agency, she was brought to Hollywood in 1944 by a 20th Century Fox talent scout. The studio initially used her as a model, giving her limited opportunities to act.

== Career ==
Downs began her film career with small roles in State Fair (1945) and The Dolly Sisters (1945). In 1946, she played the title role in My Darling Clementine and Clifton Webb's unfaithful wife in The Dark Corner. Following the success of My Darling Clementine, Downs was cast in a prison drama For You I Die (1947), an Abbott and Costello comedy The Noose Hangs High, and several Western films.

In 1947, Downs was dropped by Fox for unknown reasons and was never employed by another major studio.

In 1949, she participated in a later famous Life photo layout, in which she posed with other up-and-coming actresses, Marilyn Monroe, Lois Maxwell, Suzanne Dalbert, Laurette Luez, Jane Nigh, and Enrica Soma. By the early 1950s, she was appearing in low-budget films, including some science-fiction (sci-fi) stories, including the 1958 sci-fi/fantasy Missile to the Moon. She appeared in a television episode of The Lone Ranger in 1952.

She portrayed Ann Howe in the syndicated TV series The Joe Palooka Story (1954). In 1959, she portrayed Amelia Roberts in the episode "Marked Deck" of the Western TV series Bat Masterson. Downs worked sporadically on TV during the 1960s, with her final appearance in 1965 on Perry Mason as murder victim and title character Millicent Barton in "The Case of the Hasty Honeymooner".

Downs has a star on the Hollywood Walk of Fame for her contribution to television, at 6646 Hollywood Boulevard.

== Personal life ==
On October 8, 1949, in Las Vegas, Downs married Joe Kirkwood Jr., who played the character Joe Palooka in films and on TV. The couple divorced on February 24, 1955. On July 21, 1956, Downs married Robert M. Brunson, an electronics executive. They divorced on July 29, 1963.

Downs died of cancer on December 8, 1976, in Los Angeles, California. She is interred at Woodlawn Cemetery, Santa Monica, California.

== Filmography ==
Year	Film	Role	Other notes
1945	Diamond Horseshoe	Miss Cream Puff	Uncredited
1945	State Fair	Girl on carousel	Uncredited
1945	The Dolly Sisters	Miss Mascara	Uncredited
1946	The Dark Corner	Mari Cathcart	
1946	Do You Love Me	Clothes model	Uncredited
1946	My Darling Clementine	Clementine Carter	
1947	For You I Die	Hope Novak	
1948	The Noose Hangs High	Carol Scott	
1948	Panhandle	Jean 'Dusty' Stewart	
1949	Massacre River	Katherine 'Kitty' Reid	
1950	The Sundowners	Kathleen Boyce	
1950	Short Grass	Sharon Lynch	
1951	Joe Palooka in Triple Cross	Anne Palooka	
1952	Best Laid Plans	Mary Seaton	
1952	Gobs and Gals	Betty Lou Prentice	
1953	Bandits of the West	Joanne Collier	
1953	The Flaming Urge	Charlotte Cruickshank	
1955	The Big Tip Off	Sister Mary Joan of Arc	
1955	Kentucky Rifle	Amy Connors	
1955	The Phantom from 10,000 Leagues	Lois King	
1956	The Oklahoma Woman	Susan Grant	
1956	The She Creature	Dorothy Chappel	
1957	Curfew Breakers	Mrs. Bowman	
1957	The Amazing Colossal Man	Carol Forrest	
1958	Missile to the Moon	June Saxton	
1958	Tombstone Territory	Patricia Camden	

== Television ==
Year	Title	Role	Notes
1961	Rawhide	Jenny Stone	S3:E27, "Incident Before Black Pass"
