= Jack Bailey (actor) =

American actor and daytime game show (1907–1980)

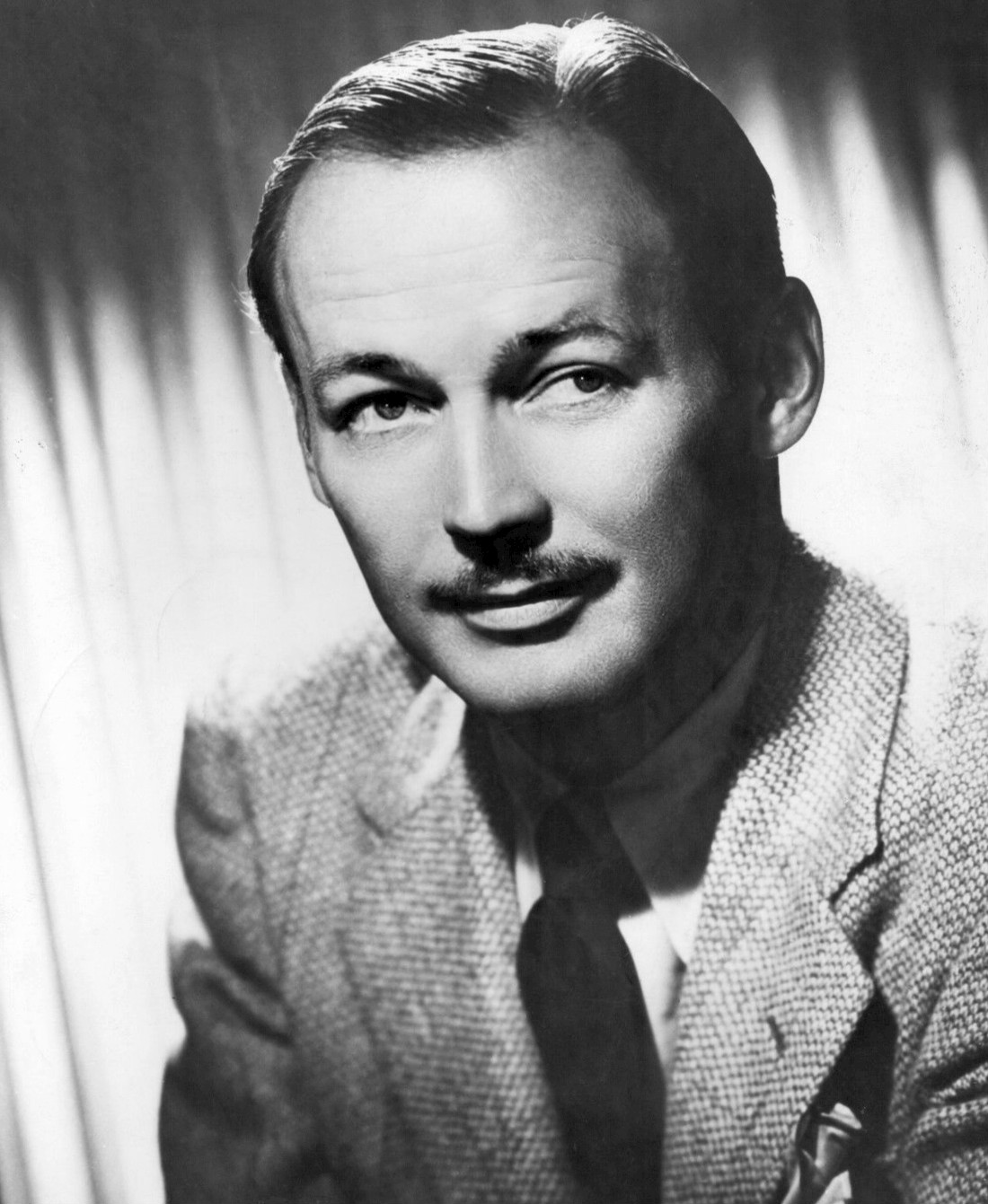
- Bailey in 1947
- Born: September 15, 1907; Hampton, Iowa, U.S.
- Died: February 1, 1980 (aged 72); Santa Monica, California, U.S.
- Occupations: Actor, game show host
- Years active: 1930s-1975
- Spouses: Carol Bailey (died 1970); Jean Bailey (m. 1972)

John Wesley Bailey Jr. (September 15, 1907 – February 1, 1980) was an American actor and daytime game show host. He died of complications of pneumonia on February 1, 1980 in Santa Monica, California, at age 72.

== Career ==
A former vaudeville musician and World's Fair barker, Bailey is best remembered as the host of Queen for a Day, a daytime game show which first aired on the Mutual Broadcasting System in 1945 and later moved to television, where it ran locally in the Los Angeles area from 1948 through 1955, on the NBC Television network from January 3, 1956 to September 2, 1960, and on the ABC network from September 5, 1960 to October 2, 1964. Each episode started with a different introduction (some of which were parodies of other popular shows of the time period), but inevitably the opening would resolve when Bailey pointed to the camera (and the audience) and loudly asked, "Would you like to be Queen for a Day?" as the live audience, mostly women, cheered.

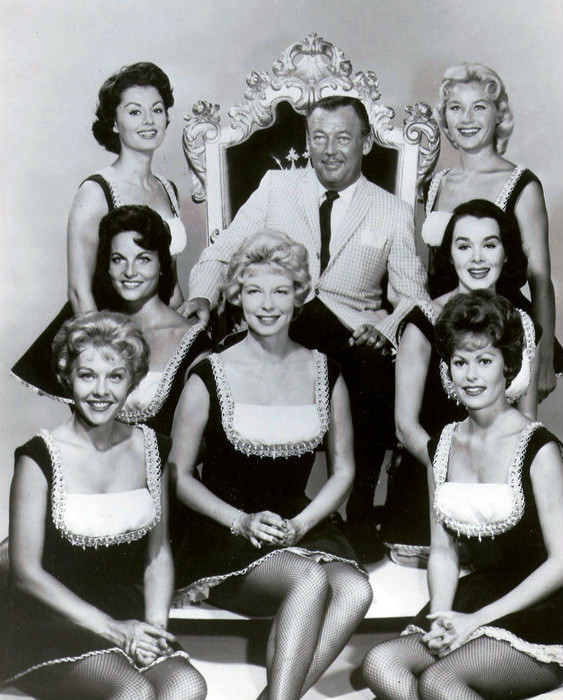
Bailey as host of Queen for a Day.

Prior to his success with Queen for a Day, Bailey had a varied career, including "playing with jazz bands, directing musical comedy, tent shows and barking for the World's Fair in Chicago in 1933." He was an announcer for several radio programs, including The Adventures of Ozzie and Harriet, Duffy's Tavern, and Meet the Missus.

Bailey also hosted the television game shows Place the Face (1953 – February 1954) and Truth or Consequences from 1954 to 1956.

His other work in television included appearances in episodes of The Ford Show, Starring Tennessee Ernie Ford, Mister Ed, Green Acres, I Dream of Jeannie, Gunsmoke, and Ironside, plus narration for the Walt Disney organization. He had a small part in the Frank Capra film It's a Wonderful Life and he also toured the country in musical stage productions, such as Hello Dolly, The Sound of Music, and The Music Man.

Bailey joined Alcoholics Anonymous around 1948 and was a public supporting member of the organization for more than 30 years.

He was awarded two stars on the Hollywood Walk of Fame—one for his radio career, at 1708 Vine Street, and one for his work in television, at 6411 Hollywood Boulevard in Hollywood, California.

== Family ==
Bailey was preceded in death by his first wife, Carol. He was survived by his second wife, Jean. He had no children.

== Filmography ==
Year	Title	Role	Notes
1939	Goofy and Wilbur	Goofy	Voice, uncredited
1944	The Contender	Second Fight Ring announcer	Uncredited
1946	It's a Wonderful Life	One of Vi's Suitors	Uncredited
1948	He Walked by Night	Witness in Pajamas and Robe	Uncredited
1950	Mrs. O'Malley and Mr. Malone	Game Show host	
1951	Queen for a Day	Jack Bailey	
1952	Carson's Cellar	Himself	Television Series one episode
1955	Walt Disney's Wonderful World of Color	Announcer	Television Series one episode
1965	Mister Ed	Purser	Television Series one episode
1966	Bob Hope Presents the Chrysler Theatre	Albert House	Television Series one episode
1966	Green Acres	Announcer	Television Series one episode
1966	Batman	Debate moderator, Dizzoner the Penguin	Television Series one episode
1967	The Monroes	Crick	Television Series one episode
1967	I Dream of Jeannie	Dr.Dawson	Television Series one episode
1967; 1969	Gunsmoke	Ben Leary; Judge Brooker	Television Series two episodes
1969	Lancer	Evans	Television Series one episode
1971	The Days of the Wolves	The Mayor	
1971	The D.A.	Lindsey	Television Series one episode
1972	Adam-12	George Nash	Television Series one episode
1973	Emergency!	Homer	Television Series one episode
1974	How to Seduce a Woman	Mr.Tolkas	
1974	Dusty's Trail	Gen. Cunningham	Television Series one episode
1974	Police Story	Riley	Television Series one episode
1974	Apple's Way	Kilkenny	Television Series one episode
1975	The Strongest Man in the World	Jack	
