= Gene Autry filmography =

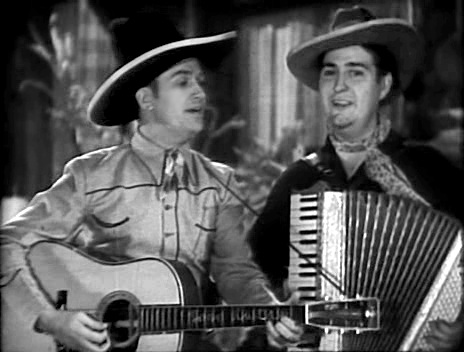
Gene Autry and Smiley Burnette in their first film appearance together in the 1934 film In Old Santa Fe

This Gene Autry filmography lists the films and television episodes starring the American singing cowboy Gene Autry.

== Overview ==
From 1934 to 1953, Autry appeared in 93 films. Discovered by film producer Nat Levine in 1934, Autry and his sidekick Smiley Burnette made their film debut for Mascot Pictures in In Old Santa Fe as part of a singing cowboy quartet. In 1935, Levine gave him the starring role in the 12-part serial The Phantom Empire. When Mascot was absorbed by the newly formed Republic Pictures, Autry went along to make 57 B Westerns in which he played under his own name, rode his own horse, Champion, had Burnette as his sidekick, and sang several songs in each film—including some that would become his most popular hits. In 1947, with his Republic contract fulfilled, Autry began producing his own films which were distributed by Columbia Pictures. For his Columbia films, Autry chose Sterling Holloway as his sidekick for five films, and then Pat Buttram for sixteen films. Burnette returned for the last six films released in 1953. From 1950 to 1955, Autry appeared in 91 episodes of The Gene Autry Show television series. Buttram played his sidekick in 83 of the 91 episodes.

While his films never achieved the critical recognition given to the films by John Ford, Henry Hathaway, and others, Autry was more popular than John Wayne for nearly a decade. He was voted the top Western movie star for six years in a row, and was named the fourth most popular of all box-office stars in America by film exhibitors in 1940. In the Motion Picture Herald Top Ten Money-Making Western Stars poll, Autry was listed every year from 1936 to 1942 and 1946 to 1954 (he served in the AAF 1943–45), holding first place from 1937 to 1942, and second place from 1947 to 1954. He appeared in the Box Office poll from 1936 to 1955, holding first place from 1936 to 1942, and second place from 1943 to 1952. His popularity with audiences was reflected in his box office drawing power, appeared in the Top Ten Money Makers Poll of all films from 1940 to 1942.

While Autry worked with many directors, screenwriters, and actresses throughout his career, some played especially important roles in the development of Autry's screen persona and style. Joe Kane directed 17 Autry films, Frank McDonald directed 9 films and 16 television episodes, George Sherman directed 5 films, William Morgan directed 7 films, John English directed 19 films and 2 television episodes, and George Archainbaud directed 12 films and 47 television episodes. Some writers were equally important in providing stories that Autry felt comfortable dramatizing. Oliver Drake wrote 7 screenplays, Dorrell and Stuart McGowen wrote 15, Betty Burbridge wrote 14, Gerald Geraghty wrote 19, Norman S. Hall wrote 10, and Olive Cooper wrote 6. Of the many leading ladies who played opposite Autry in his films and television series, a few stand out, including Ann Rutherford in 4 films, Carol Hughs in 3 films, June Storey in 10 films, Fay McKenzie in 5 films, ad Gail Davis in 14 films and 15 television episodes. One of the most important components of Autry's films was the comic relief provided by his sidekicks. Smiley Burnette co-starred in 60 Autry films, Sterling Holloway in 5 films, and Pat Buttramin in 16 films and 83 television episodes.

In his book Singing in the Saddle, author Douglas B. Green wrote that Autry had a profound impact on the western genre film, and that his early "pioneering films" heralded the musical western genre, which from that point on made up a high percentage of B-westerns. Other western stars began to make room in their films for musical numbers by popular western singing groups like the Sons of the Pioneers. Green continued:

Autry's early films broke ground in a number of other ways. Comedy (usually in the person of Smiley "Frog Millhouse" Burnette) was featured to a degree rarely if ever seen before in westerns; women were usually not portrayed as helpless prairie flowers in need of a good rescuing, but instead as independent, sassy, and intelligent; and, with a few exceptions, the time period was the present. Once the viewer could accept a West where six-guns and saddles coincided with radios, telephones, and Lincoln convertibles, scripts could touch on a number of contemporary social issues, such as the Dust Bowl and the treatment of Native Americans. The films often reflected the populist sentiment of the day: Gene Autry portrayed an Everyman, championing the rights of the small ranchers, farmers, and townspeople against heartless business conglomerates, corrupt politicians, or the injustices of "the system".

As of 2014, a large number of these films and television episodes remain available via the Gene Autry Foundation on the Western Channel (a cable television station), the latter having collaborated with the Foundation to restore the Republic titles, which had been cut to a uniform 54 minutes for television release in the 1950s, to full length and to provide clean negative-based source prints for all the titles in the 1990s. Autry is the only person to have five stars on the Hollywood Walk of Fame, one in each of the five categories maintained by the Hollywood Chamber of Commerce—motion pictures, radio, recording, television, and live theater. His motion picture star is located at 6644 Hollywood Boulevard, and his television star is located at 6667 Hollywood Boulevard

== Films ==
| Year | Title | Role | Director | Leading lady | Sidekick | Studio | Notes |
|---|---|---|---|---|---|---|---|
| 1934 | In Old Santa Fe | Himself | David Howard | Evalyn Knapp | Smiley Burnette | Mascot Pictures | |
| 1934 | Mystery Mountain | Thomas - Teamster | Otto Brower, B. Reeves Eason | Verna Hillie | Smiley Burnette | Mascot Pictures | Serial, [Ch. 6, 7] Uncredited |
| 1935 | The Phantom Empire | Himself | Otto Brower, B. Reeves Eason | Betsy King Ross | Smiley Burnette | Mascot Pictures | |
| 1935 | Tumbling Tumbleweeds | Himself | Joseph Kane | Lucile Browne | Smiley Burnette | Republic Pictures | |
| 1935 | Melody Trail | Himself | Joseph Kane | Ann Rutherford | Smiley Burnette | Republic Pictures | |
| 1935 | The Sagebrush Troubadour | Gene Autry | Joseph Kane | Barbara Pepper | Smiley Burnette | Republic Pictures | |
| 1935 | The Singing Vagabond | Captain Tex Autry | Carl Pierson | Ann Rutherford | Smiley Burnette | Republic Pictures | |
| 1936 | Red River Valley | Himself | B. Reeves Eason | Frances Grant | Smiley Burnette | Republic Pictures | |
| 1936 | Comin' Round the Mountain | Himself | Mack V. Wright | Ann Rutherford | Smiley Burnette | Republic Pictures | |
| 1936 | The Singing Cowboy | Himself | Mack V. Wright | Lois Wilde | Smiley Burnette | Republic Pictures | |
| 1936 | Guns and Guitars | Himself | Joseph Kane | Dorothy Dix | Smiley Burnette | Republic Pictures | |
| 1936 | Oh, Susanna! | Himself | Joseph Kane | Frances Grant | Smiley Burnette | Republic Pictures | |
| 1936 | Ride Ranger Ride | Himself | Joseph Kane | Kay Hughes | Smiley Burnette | Republic Pictures | |
| 1936 | The Big Show | Himself / Tom Ford | Mack V. Wright | Kay Hughes | Smiley Burnette | Republic Pictures | |
| 1936 | The Old Corral | Himself | Joseph Kane | Irene Manning | Smiley Burnette | Republic Pictures | |
| 1937 | Round-Up Time in Texas | Himself | Joseph Kane | Maxine Doyle | Smiley Burnette | Republic Pictures | |
| 1937 | Git Along Little Dogies | Himself | Joseph Kane | Judith Allen | Smiley Burnette | Republic Pictures | |
| 1937 | Rootin' Tootin' Rhythm | Himself | Mack V. Wright | Armida | Smiley Burnette | Republic Pictures | |
| 1937 | Yodelin' Kid from Pine Ridge | Himself | Joseph Kane | Betty Bronson | Smiley Burnette | Republic Pictures | |
| 1937 | Public Cowboy No. 1 | Himself | Joseph Kane | Ann Rutherford | Smiley Burnette | Republic Pictures | |
| 1937 | Boots and Saddles | Himself | Joseph Kane | Judith Allen | Smiley Burnette | Republic Pictures | |
| 1937 | Springtime in the Rockies | Himself | Joseph Kane | Polly Rowles | Smiley Burnette | Republic Pictures | |
| 1937 | Manhattan Merry-Go-Round | Himself | Charles Reisner | Ann Dvorak | | Republic Pictures | |
| 1938 | The Old Barn Dance | Himself | Joseph Kane | Joan Valerie | Smiley Burnette | Republic Pictures | |
| 1938 | Gold Mine in the Sky | Himself | Joseph Kane | Carol Hughes | Smiley Burnette | Republic Pictures | |
| 1938 | Man from Music Mountain | Himself | Joseph Kane | Carol Hughes | Smiley Burnette | Republic Pictures | |
| 1938 | Prairie Moon | Himself | Ralph Staub | Shirley Deane | Smiley Burnette | Republic Pictures | |
| 1938 | Rhythm of the Saddle | Himself | George Sherman | Peggy Moran | Smiley Burnette | Republic Pictures | |
| 1938 | Western Jamboree | Himself | Ralph Staub | Jean Rouverol | Smiley Burnette | Republic Pictures | |
| 1939 | Home on the Prairie | Himself | Jack Townley | June Storey | Smiley Burnette | Republic Pictures | |
| 1939 | Mexicali Rose | Himself | George Sherman | Luana Walters | Smiley Burnette | Republic Pictures | |
| 1939 | Blue Montana Skies | Himself | B. Reeves Eason | June Storey | Smiley Burnette | Republic Pictures | |
| 1939 | Mountain Rhythm | Himself | B. Reeves Eason | June Storey | Smiley Burnette | Republic Pictures | |
| 1939 | Colorado Sunset | Himself | George Sherman | June Storey | Smiley Burnette | Republic Pictures | |
| 1939 | In Old Monterey | Himself | Joseph Kane | June Storey | Smiley Burnette | Republic Pictures | |
| 1939 | Rovin' Tumbleweeds | Himself | George Sherman | Mary Carlisle | Smiley Burnette | Republic Pictures | |
| 1939 | South of the Border | Himself | George Sherman | June Storey | Smiley Burnette | Republic Pictures | |
| 1940 | Rancho Grande | Himself | Frank McDonald | June Storey | Smiley Burnette | Republic Pictures | |
| 1940 | Shooting High | Will Carson | Alfred E. Green | Marjorie Weaver | — | 20th Century Fox | |
| 1940 | Gaucho Serenade | Himself | Frank McDonald | June Storey | Smiley Burnette | Republic Pictures | |
| 1940 | Carolina Moon | Himself | Frank McDonald | June Storey | Smiley Burnette | Republic Pictures | |
| 1940 | Ride, Tenderfoot, Ride | Himself | Frank McDonald | June Storey | Smiley Burnette | Republic Pictures | |
| 1940 | Melody Ranch | Himself | Joseph Santley | Ann Miller | Jimmy Durante | Republic Pictures | |
| 1941 | Ridin' on a Rainbow | Himself | Lew Landers | Carol Adams | Smiley Burnette | Republic Pictures | |
| 1941 | Back in the Saddle | Himself | Lew Landers | Julie Bishop | Smiley Burnette | Republic Pictures | |
| 1941 | The Singing Hill | Himself | Lew Landers | Virginia Dale | Smiley Burnette | Republic Pictures | |
| 1941 | Sunset in Wyoming | Himself | William Morgan | Maris Wrixon | Smiley Burnette | Republic Pictures | |
| 1941 | Under Fiesta Stars | Himself | Frank McDonald | Carol Hughes | Smiley Burnette | Republic Pictures | |
| 1941 | Down Mexico Way | Himself | Joseph Santley | Fay McKenzie | Smiley Burnette | Republic Pictures | |
| 1941 | Sierra Sue | Himself | William Morgan | Fay McKenzie | Smiley Burnette | Republic Pictures | |
| 1942 | Cowboy Serenade | Himself | William Morgan | Fay McKenzie | Smiley Burnette | Republic Pictures | |
| 1942 | Heart of the Rio Grande | Himself | William Morgan | Fay McKenzie | Smiley Burnette | Republic Pictures | |
| 1942 | Home in Wyomin' | Himself | William Morgan | Fay McKenzie | Smiley Burnette | Republic Pictures | |
| 1942 | Stardust on the Sage | Himself | William Morgan | Louise Currie | Smiley Burnette | Republic Pictures | |
| 1942 | Call of the Canyon | Himself | Joseph Santley | Ruth Terry | Smiley Burnette | Republic Pictures | |
| 1942 | Bells of Capistrano | Himself | William Morgan | Virginia Grey | Smiley Burnette | Republic Pictures | |
| 1946 | Sioux City Sue | Himself | Frank McDonald | Lynne Roberts | Sterling Holloway | Republic Pictures | |
| 1947 | Trail to San Antone | Himself | John English | Peggy Stewart | Sterling Holloway | Republic Pictures | |
| 1947 | Twilight on the Rio Grande | Himself | Frank McDonald | Adele Mara | Sterling Holloway | Republic Pictures | |
| 1947 | Saddle Pals | Himself | Lesley Selander | Lynne Roberts | Sterling Holloway | Republic Pictures | |
| 1947 | Robin Hood of Texas | Himself | Lesley Selander | Lynne Roberts | Sterling Holloway | Republic Pictures | |
| 1947 | The Last Round-Up | Himself | John English | Jean Heather | Shug Fisher | Columbia Pictures | |
| 1948 | The Strawberry Roan | Himself | John English | Gloria Henry | Pat Buttram / Rufe Davis | Columbia Pictures | |
| 1948 | Loaded Pistols | Himself | John English | Barbara Britton | Chill Wills | Columbia Pictures | |
| 1949 | The Big Sombrero | Himself | Frank McDonald | Elena Verdugo | none | Columbia Pictures | |
| 1949 | Riders of the Whistling Pines | Himself | John English | Patricia White | none | Columbia Pictures | |
| 1949 | Rim of the Canyon | Himself | John English | Nan Leslie | Clem Bevans | Columbia Pictures | |
| 1949 | The Cowboy and the Indians | Himself | John English | Sheila Ryan | Hank Patterson | Columbia Pictures | |
| 1949 | Riders in the Sky | Himself | John English | Gloria Henry | Pat Buttram | Columbia Pictures | |
| 1949 | Sons of New Mexico | Himself | John English | Gail Davis | Pat Buttram | Columbia Pictures | |
| 1950 | Mule Train | Himself | John English | Sheila Ryan | Pat Buttram | Columbia Pictures | |
| 1950 | Cow Town | Himself | John English | Gail Davis | Pat Buttram | Columbia Pictures | |
| 1950 | Hoedown | Himself | Ray Nazarro | Jeff Donnell | | Columbia Pictures | |
| 1950 | Beyond the Purple Hills | Himself | John English | Jo Dennison | Pat Buttram | Columbia Pictures | |
| 1950 | Indian Territory | Himself | John English | Gail Davis | Pat Buttram | Columbia Pictures | |
| 1950 | The Blazing Sun | Himself | John English | Lynn Roberts | Pat Buttram | Columbia Pictures | |
| 1951 | Gene Autry and the Mounties | Himself | John English | Elena Verdugo | Pat Buttram | Columbia Pictures | |
| 1951 | Texans Never Cry | Himself | Frank McDonald | Gail Davis | Pat Buttram | Columbia Pictures | |
| 1951 | Whirlwind | Himself | John English | Gail Davis | Smiley Burnette | Columbia Pictures | |
| 1951 | Silver Canyon | Himself | John English | Gail Davis | Pat Buttram | Columbia Pictures | |
| 1951 | The Hills of Utah | Himself | John English | Elaine Riley | Pat Buttram | Columbia Pictures | |
| 1951 | Valley of Fire | Himself | John English | Gail Davis | Pat Buttram | Columbia Pictures | |
| 1952 | The Old West | Himself | George Archainbaud | Gail Davis | Pat Buttram | Columbia Pictures | |
| 1952 | Night Stage to Galveston | Himself | George Archainbaud | Virginia Huston | Pat Buttram | Columbia Pictures | |
| 1952 | Apache Country | Himself | George Archainbaud | Carolina Cotton | Pat Buttram | Columbia Pictures | |
| 1952 | Barbed Wire | Himself | George Archainbaud | Anne James | Pat Buttram | Columbia Pictures | |
| 1952 | Wagon Team | Himself | George Archainbaud | Gail Davis | Pat Buttram | Columbia Pictures | |
| 1952 | Rainbow 'Round My Shoulder | Himself | Richard Quine | Charlotte Austin | | Columbia Pictures | |
| 1952 | Blue Canadian Rockies | Himself | George Archainbaud | Gail Davis | Pat Buttram | Columbia Pictures | |
| 1953 | Winning of the West | Himself | George Archainbaud | Gail Davis | Smiley Burnette | Columbia Pictures | |
| 1953 | On Top of Old Smoky | Himself | George Archainbaud | Gail Davis | Smiley Burnette | Columbia Pictures | |
| 1953 | Goldtown Ghost Riders | Himself | George Archainbaud | Gail Davis | Smiley Burnette | Columbia Pictures | |
| 1953 | Pack Train | Himself | George Archainbaud | Gail Davis | Smiley Burnette | Columbia Pictures | |
| 1953 | Saginaw Trail | Himself | George Archainbaud | Connie Marshall | Smiley Burnette | Columbia Pictures | |
| 1953 | Last of the Pony Riders | Himself | George Archainbaud | Kathleen Case | Smiley Burnette | Columbia Pictures | |
| 1959 | Alias Jesse James | Himself | Norman Z. McLeod | Rhonda Fleming | | United Artists | (scenes deleted) |

== Television ==
The Gene Autry Show first aired on the CBS television network on Sunday July 23, 1950 and ran for five years for a total of 91 episodes, with the last show airing on December 17, 1955. All the shows were produced by Autry's Flying A Pictures production company and were 30 minutes in length. Fifteen episodes were filmed in color. The Gene Autry Show continued to be broadcast in syndication well into the 1970s.

| Year | Title | Director | Leading lady | Sidekick | Airdate |
|---|---|---|---|---|---|
| 1950 | Head for Texas | Frank McDonald | Barbara Stanley | Pat Buttram | July 23, 1950 |
| 1950 | Gold Dust Charlie | Frank McDonald | Sheila Ryan | Pat Buttram | July 30, 1950 |
| 1950 | The Silver Arrow | Frank McDonald | Sandy Sanders | Pat Buttram | August 6, 1950 |
| 1950 | The Doodle Bug | Frank McDonald | Sheila Ryan | Pat Buttram | August 13, 1950 |
| 1950 | The Star Toter | Frank McDonald | Barbara Stanley | Pat Buttram | August 20, 1950 |
| 1950 | The Double Switch | Frank McDonald | — | Pat Buttram | August 27, 1950 |
| 1950 | Blackwater Valley Feud | George Archainbaud | Gail Davis | Pat Buttram | September 3, 1950 |
| 1950 | Doublecross Valley | George Archainbaud | Gail Davis | Pat Buttram | September 10, 1950 |
| 1950 | The Posse | George Archainbaud | Wendy Waldron | Pat Buttram | September 17, 1950 |
| 1950 | The Devil's Brand | George Archainbaud | Gail Davis | Pat Buttram | September 24, 1950 |
| 1950 | The Poinsoned Waterhole | Frank McDonald | Sheila Ryan | Pat Buttram | October 8, 1950 |
| 1950 | The Lost Chance | Frank McDonald | — | Pat Buttram | October 15, 1950 |
| 1950 | The Black Rider | Frank McDonald | Sheila Ryan | Pat Buttram | October 22, 1950 |
| 1950 | Gunpowder Range | George Archainbaud | Gail Davis | Pat Buttram | October 29, 1950 |
| 1950 | The Breakup | George Archainbaud | Lynne Roberts | Pat Buttram | November 5, 1950 |
| 1950 | Twisted Trails | George Archainbaud | Lynne Roberts | Pat Buttram | November 12, 1950 |
| 1950 | The Fight at Peaceful Mesa | George Archainbaud | Gail Davis | Pat Buttram | November 19, 1950 |
| 1950 | Hot Lead | George Archainbaud | — | Alan Hale Jr. | November 26, 1950 |
| 1950 | The Gray Dude | Frank McDonald | — | Chill Wills | December 3, 1950 |
| 1950 | The Killer Horse | George Archainbaud | — | Alan Hale Jr. | December 10, 1950 |
| 1950 | The Peacemaker | Frank McDonald | Peggy Stewart | Chill Wills | December 17, 1950 |
| 1950 | The Sheriff of Santa Rose | George Archainbaud | Nan Leslie | Fuzzy Knight | December 24, 1950 |
| 1950 | T.N.T. | George Archainbaud | Eilene Janssen | Fuzzy Knight | December 24, 1950 |
| 1951 | The Raiders | John English | Nan Leslie | Fuzzy Knight | April 14, 1951 |
| 1951 | Double-Barreled Vengeance | John English | Nan Leslie | Fuzzy Knight | April 21, 1951 |
