= Gregg Barton =

American actor (1912–2000)

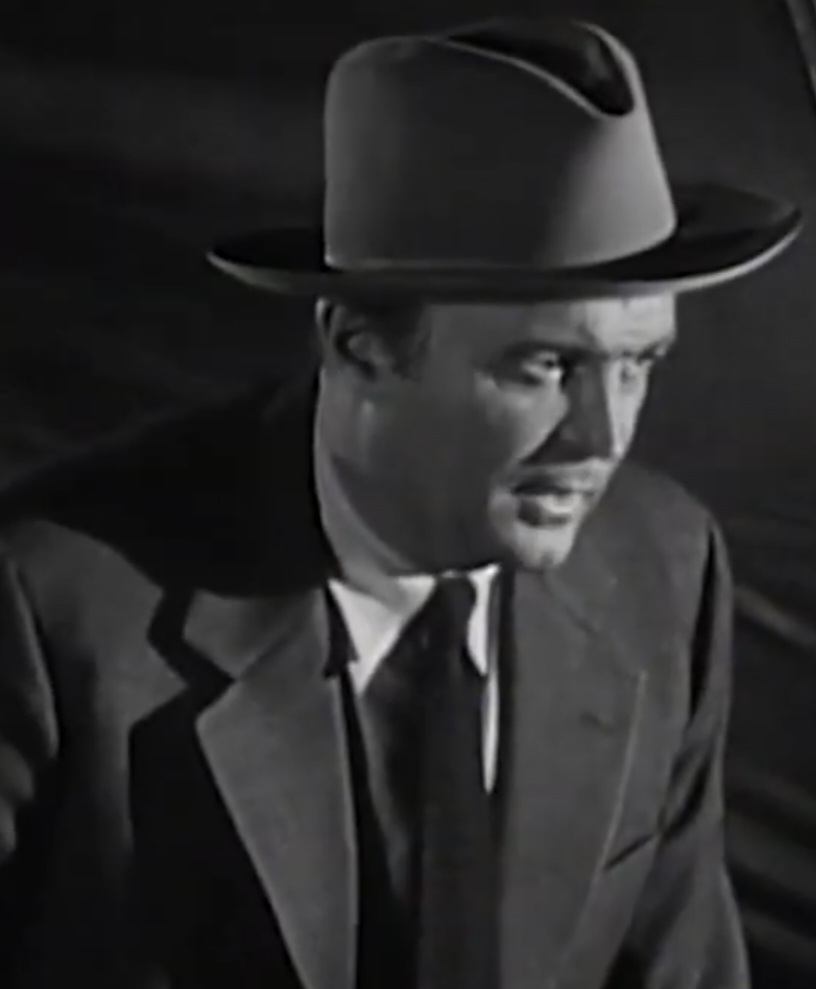
- Barton in an episode of The Public Defender (1955)
- Born: Harold Wilson Barker; June 5, 1912; Long Island City, New York, U.S.
- Died: November 28, 2000 (aged 88)
- Resting place: Fort Rosecrans National Cemetery, San Diego, California
- Occupation: Actor
- Years active: 1942–1966

Gregg Barton (Born Harold Wilson Barker; June 5, 1912 – November 28, 2000) was an American actor, who played various roles in feature films and television series.

== Career ==
Born in Oswego, New York, Barton is possibly best remembered for having played the role of Stan Richter in the syndicated television series The Gene Autry Show. He appeared sixteen times on another syndicated series, The Range Rider, eleven times on Annie Oakley, seven times each on The Adventures of Wild Bill Hickok and The Lone Ranger, six times on 26 Men, five times on ABC's The Life and Legend of Wyatt Earp, four times on NBC's Laramie, and three times each on The Texan and Tales of the Texas Rangers.

Barton played guest roles in other series too, such as Sky King (1952 and 1956), Adventures of Superman (1953), The Cisco Kid (1954), Steve Donovan, Western Marshal (1956), Fury (1958), Jefferson Drum (1958), The Deputy (1959), Bonanza (1960), Wagon Train (1962), and Death Valley Days (1969).

He appeared in such films as Flying Tigers (1942) with John Wayne, The Three Musketeers (1948), The Man from Laramie (1955), China Doll (1958) with Victor Mature and Morituri (1965) with Marlon Brando.

== Death ==
Barton died in 2000. He was interred at Fort Rosecrans National Cemetery in San Diego, California.

== Selected filmography ==
- 1942: A Yank at Eton - Coach (uncredited)
- 1942: Flying Tigers - Tex Norton
- 1947: The Beginning or the End – Enola Gay Navigator (uncredited)
- 1947: West to Glory – Jim Barrett
- 1947: Kilroy Was Here – Guard
- 1947: Song of the Thin Man – Male Nurse (uncredited)
- 1947: Big Town After Dark – Detective (uncredited)
- 1948: Albuquerque – Murkill's Henchman in Buckboard / Ted's Assailant (uncredited)
- 1948: Homecoming – Captain (uncredited)
- 1948: Raw Deal – Car Owner (uncredited)
- 1948: Tap Roots – Captain (uncredited)
- 1948: Michael O'Halloran – Officer Barker
- 1948: The Three Musketeers – Musketeer (uncredited)
- 1948: Joan of Arc – Capt. Louis de Culan
- 1948: Command Decision – Sergeant (uncredited)
- 1949: Johnny Stool Pigeon – Treasury Man (uncredited)
- 1949: Not Wanted – Patrolman
- 1949: Massacre River – Frank
- 1949: Scene of the Crime – Detective (uncredited)
- 1949: Task Force – Pilot (uncredited)
- 1949: That Midnight Kiss – Stagehand (uncredited)
- 1949: Fighting Man of the Plains – Rowdy Cowboy at Dance (uncredited)
- 1949: The Threat – Reporter (uncredited)
- 1950: When Willie Comes Marching Home – Colonel (uncredited)
- 1950: Mule Train – Rollins (uncredited)
- 1950: The Outriders – Outrider (uncredited)
- 1950: The Gunfighter – Pete's Pal (uncredited)
- 1950: Texas Dynamo – Luke
- 1950: Beyond the Purple Hills – Ross Pardee – Henchman (uncredited)
- 1950: Tripoli – Huggins
- 1950: The Blazing Sun – Trot Lucas
- 1950: Gambling House – First Police Officer (uncredited)
- 1951: Gene Autry and the Mounties – Sergeant Stuart (uncredited)
- 1951: Silver City Bonanza – Henchman Hank
- 1951: Whirlwind – Bill Trask
- 1951: Fort Worth – Clevenger's Man (uncredited)
- 1951: The Red Badge of Courage – Soldier (uncredited)
- 1951: The Racket – Rookie Cop (uncredited)
- 1951: The Golden Horde – Kalmuk Officer (uncredited)
- 1951: Valley of Fire – Henchman Blackie (uncredited)
- 1951: Distant Drums – Pvt. James W. Tasher (uncredited)
- 1952: Bend of the River – Miner (uncredited)
- 1952: At Sword's Point – Regent's Guardman at Fallen Tree (uncredited)
- 1952: The Gunman – Bill Longley – Henchman
- 1952: Apache Country – Luke Thorn (uncredited)
- 1952: The World in His Arms – Seaman (uncredited)
- 1952: Dead Man's Trail – Henchman Yeager
- 1952: Wagon Team – Henchman (uncredited)
- 1952: Operation Secret (1952) – Sentry (uncredited)
- 1952: Montana Belle – Deputy Stewart (uncredited)
- 1952: The Maverick – George Fane
- 1953: Winning of the West – Clint Raybold
- 1953: The Man Behind the Gun – Henchman Luke (uncredited)
- 1953: Gunsmoke – Bratton (uncredited)
- 1953: Rebel City – Man dressed like Greeley (uncredited)
- 1953: Law and Order – Wingett (uncredited)
- 1953: The Moonlighter – Bar X Man in Lynch Mob (uncredited)
- 1953: Saginaw Trail – Trapper (uncredited)
- 1953: Captain Scarface – Captain of Rescue Boat (uncredited)
- 1953: Last of the Pony Riders – Dutch Murdoch
- 1953: Tumbleweed – Miner (uncredited)
- 1954: The Command – Capt. Forsythe (uncredited)
- 1954: Jivaro – Edwards
- 1954: Gunfighters of the Northwest (Serial) – Hank Bridger
- 1954: The Forty-Niners – Card Player (uncredited)
- 1954: Drums Across the River – Fallon
- 1954: Man with the Steel Whip – Stanton (uncredited)
- 1954: The Far Country – Rounds (uncredited)
- 1954: The Law vs. Billy the Kid – Parson Ranch Hand (uncredited)
- 1954: Two Guns and a Badge – Outlaw
- 1954: Riding with Buffalo Bill (Serial) – Henchman Bart
- 1954: Masterson of Kansas – Sutton – Henchman
- 1955: Dial Red O – Attendant (uncredited)
- 1955: The Man from Laramie – Fritz
- 1955: Seven Angry Men – O'Neil (uncredited)
- 1955: Bobby Ware Is Missing – Man in Search Party (uncredited)
- 1955: The Second Greatest Sex – Simon's Henchman (uncredited)
- 1956: The Conqueror – Jalair (uncredited)
- 1956: Backlash – Sleepy
- 1956: Uranium Boom – Phil McGinnus
- 1956: Raw Edge – McKay
- 1956: Blazing the Overland Trail – Captain Carter
- 1956: Tension at Table Rock – Striker (uncredited)
- 1957: Last of the Badmen – John Spencer / John Dozer (uncredited)
- 1957: Jet Pilot – Military Policeman (uncredited)
- 1957: Joe Dakota – Tom Jensen
- 1958: Man from God's Country – Col. Miller
- 1958: The Toughest Gun in Tombstone – Henchman Leslie (uncredited)
- 1958: China Doll – Airman
- 1958: The Badlanders – Mine Foreman (uncredited)
- 1959: Good Day for a Hanging – Frank (uncredited)
- 1959: Never Steal Anything Small – Deputy Warden
- 1959: Lone Texan – Ben Hollis
- 1959: The Gunfight at Dodge City – Townsman (uncredited)
- 1963: The Gun Hawk – Henchman
- 1965: Morituri – Merchant Marine (uncredited)
