= Pack Train =

1953 film by George Archainbaud

- Directed by: George Archainbaud
- Written by: Norman S. Hall
- Produced by: Armand Schaefer
- Starring: Gene Autry; Gail Davis
- Cinematography: William Bradford
- Edited by: James Sweeney
- Production company: Columbia Pictures
- Distributed by: Columbia Pictures
- Release date: July 5, 1953
- Running time: 57 minutes
- Country: United States
- Language: English

Pack Train is a 1953 American Western film directed by George Archainbaud and starring Gene Autry and Gail Davis.

== Cast ==
- Gene Autry as Gene Autry
- Champion as Gene's Horse
- Gail Davis as Jennifer Coleman
- Kenne Duncan as Ross McLain
- Sheila Ryan as Lola Riker
- Tom London as Dan Coleman
- Smiley Burnette as Smiley Burnette

== Bibliography ==
- Rowan, Terry. The American Western A Complete Film Guide. 2013.
