= Goldtown Ghost Riders =

1953 film by George Archainbaud

- Directed by: George Archainbaud
- Written by: Gerald Geraghty
- Produced by: Armand Schaefer
- Starring: Gene Autry; Gail Davis
- Cinematography: William Bradford
- Edited by: James Sweeney
- Production company: Columbia Pictures
- Distributed by: Columbia Pictures
- Release date: May 20, 1953
- Running time: 57 minutes
- Country: United States
- Language: English

Goldtown Ghost Riders is a 1953 American Western film directed by George Archainbaud and starring Gene Autry and Gail Davis.

== Cast ==
- Gene Autry as Gene Autry
- Champion as Champ, Gene's Horse
- Gail Davis as Cathy Wheeler
- Kirk Riley as Ed Wheeler
- Carleton Young as Jim Granby
- Neyle Morrow as Teeno
- Smiley Burnette as Smiley Burnette
- Steve Conte as Blackwell

== Bibliography ==
- Rowan, Terry. The American Western A Complete Film Guide. 2013.
