= On Top of Old Smoky (film) =

1953 film

- Theatrical film poster
- Directed by: George Archainbaud
- Written by: Gerald Geraghty
- Produced by: Armand Schaefer
- Starring: Gene Autry; Gail Davis
- Cinematography: William Bradford
- Edited by: James Sweeney
- Production company: Columbia Pictures
- Distributed by: Columbia Pictures
- Release date: March 25, 1953
- Running time: 59 minutes
- Country: United States
- Language: English

On Top of Old Smoky is a 1953 American Western film directed by George Archainbaud and starring Gene Autry and Gail Davis. It takes its title from the song "On Top of Old Smoky".

== Cast ==
- Gene Autry as Gene Autry
- Champion as Champ
- Gail Davis as Jen Larrabee
- Grandon Rhodes as Doc Judson
- Sheila Ryan as Lila
- Kenne Duncan as Mcquaid
- The Cass County Boys as Cass County Boys Band
- Smiley Burnette as Smiley
