= Silver Canyon (film) =

1951 film by John English

- Theatrical release poster
- Directed by: John English
- Screenplay by: Gerald Geraghty
- Story by: Alan James
- Produced by: Armand Schaefer
- Starring: Gene Autry; Gail Davis; Jim Davis; Bob Steele; Edgar Dearing; Richard Alexander
- Cinematography: William Bradford
- Edited by: James Sweeney
- Production company: Gene Autry Productions
- Distributed by: Columbia Pictures
- Release date: June 20, 1951
- Running time: 70 minutes
- Country: United States
- Language: English

Silver Canyon is a 1951 American Western film directed by John English, written by Gerald Geraghty and starring Gene Autry, Gail Davis, Jim Davis, Bob Steele, Edgar Dearing and Richard Alexander. The film was released on June 20, 1951 by Columbia Pictures.

== Cast ==
- Gene Autry as Gene Autry
- Gail Davis as Dell Middler
- Jim Davis as Wade McQuarrie
- Bob Steele as Walt Middler
- Edgar Dearing as Colonel Middler
- Richard Alexander as Luke Anders
- Terry Frost as Irv Wyatt
- Peter Mamakos as Laughing Jack
- Pat Buttram as Pat Claggett
- Champion as Gene's Horse
