= Winning of the West =

1953 film

- Directed by: George Archainbaud
- Written by: Norman S. Hall
- Produced by: Armand Schaefer
- Starring: Gene Autry; Gail Davis
- Cinematography: William Bradford
- Edited by: James Sweeney
- Production company: Columbia Pictures
- Distributed by: Columbia Pictures
- Release date: January 1953
- Running time: 57 minutes
- Country: United States
- Language: English

Winning of the West is a 1953 American Western film directed by George Archainbaud and starring Gene Autry and Gail Davis.

== Main cast ==
- Gene Autry as Gene Autry
- Champion as Champ - Gene's Horse
- Gail Davis as Ann Randolph
- Richard Crane as Jack Autry aka Jack Austin
- Robert Livingston as Art Selby
- House Peters Jr. as Marshal Jim Hackett
- Gregg Barton as Clint Raybold
- William Forrest as Editor John Randolph
- Smiley Burnette as Smiley

== Bibliography ==
- Rowan, Terry. The American Western A Complete Film Guide. 2013.
