= Last of the Pony Riders =

1953 film by George Archainbaud

- Directed by: George Archainbaud
- Written by: Ruth Woodman
- Produced by: Armand Schaefer
- Starring: Gene Autry; Kathleen Case
- Cinematography: William Bradford
- Edited by: James Sweeney
- Production company: Columbia Pictures
- Distributed by: Columbia Pictures
- Release date: November 3, 1953
- Running time: 58 minutes
- Country: United States
- Language: English

Last of the Pony Riders is a 1953 American Western film directed by George Archainbaud and starring Gene Autry (in his last starring feature film) and Kathleen Case. It was also the last film appearance of longtime Autry sidekick Smiley Burnette.

== Cast ==
- Gene Autry as Gene Autry
- Champion as Champ
- Kathleen Case as Katie McEwen
- Dickie Jones as Johnny Blair
- John Downey as Tom McEwen
- Howard Wright as Banker Clyde Vesey
- Arthur Space as Jess Hogan
- Gregg Barton as Dutch Murdoch
- Smiley Burnette as Smiley

== Bibliography ==
- Dick, Bernard F. The Merchant Prince of Poverty Row: Harry Cohn of Columbia Pictures. University Press of Kentucky.
