= Saginaw Trail (film) =

1953 film by George Archainbaud

- Directed by: George Archainbaud
- Written by: Dorothy Yost; Dwight Cummins
- Produced by: Armand Schaefer
- Starring: Gene Autry; Connie Marshall
- Cinematography: William Bradford
- Edited by: James Sweeney
- Production company: Columbia Pictures
- Distributed by: Columbia Pictures
- Release date: September 20, 1953
- Running time: 56 minutes
- Country: United States
- Language: English

Saginaw Trail is a 1953 American Western film directed by George Archainbaud and starring Gene Autry and Connie Marshall. It is set in Michigan in the 1820s, and takes its name from the Saginaw Trail.

== Cast ==
- Gene Autry as Gene Autry
- Champion as Gene's Horse
- Connie Marshall as Flora Tourney
- Eugene Borden as Jules Brissac
- Ralph Reed as Randy Lane
- Henry Blair as Phillipe Brissac
- Myron Healey as Miller Webb
- Mickey Simpson as Frenchy
- Smiley Burnette as Smiley

== Bibliography ==
- Dick, Bernard F. The Merchant Prince of Poverty Row: Harry Cohn of Columbia Pictures. University Press of Kentucky.
