= Blue Canadian Rockies =

1952 film by George Archainbaud

- Theatrical release poster
- Directed by: George Archainbaud
- Screenplay by: Gerald Geraghty
- Produced by: Armand Schaefer
- Starring: Gene Autry; Gail Davis
- Cinematography: William Bradford
- Edited by: James Sweeney
- Production company: Gene Autry Productions
- Distributed by: Columbia Pictures
- Release date: November 30, 1952
- Running time: 58 minutes
- Country: United States
- Language: English

Blue Canadian Rockies is a 1952 American Western film directed by George Archainbaud and starring Gene Autry, who sings "Blue Canadian Rockies", written by Cindy Walker. Autry had also sung the song in Gene Autry and the Mounties (1951).

== Cast ==
- Gene Autry
- Gail Davis
