= West of Wyoming =

1950 film by Wallace Fox

- Directed by: Wallace Fox
- Written by: Adele Buffington
- Starring: Johnny Mack Brown; Gail Davis; Myron Healey
- Cinematography: Harry Neumann
- Edited by: John C. Fuller
- Music by: Edward J. Kay
- Production company: Monogram Pictures
- Distributed by: Monogram Pictures
- Release date: February 19, 1950
- Running time: 57 minutes
- Country: United States
- Language: English

West of Wyoming is a 1950 American Western film directed by Wallace Fox and starring Johnny Mack Brown, Gail Davis and Myron Healey.

== Cast ==
- Johnny Mack Brown as Johnny Mack Brown
- Gail Davis as Jennifer Draper
- Myron Healey as Brodie
- Dennis Moore as Dorsey - Henchman
- Stanley Andrews as Simon Miller
- Milburn Morante as Panhandle Jones
- Mary Gordon as Nora Jones
- Carl Mathews as Ray Barton - Henchman
- Paul Cramer as Terry Draper
- John Merton as Sheriff
- Mike Ragan as Chuck Maloo - Henchman
- Steve Clark as Dalton

== Bibliography ==
- Michael L. Stephens. Art Directors in Cinema: A Worldwide Biographical Dictionary. McFarland, 1998.
