= Apache Country =

1952 film by George Archainbaud

- Theatrical release poster
- Directed by: George Archainbaud
- Written by: Norman S. Hall
- Produced by: Armand Schaefer
- Starring: Gene Autry; Carolina Cotton; Harry Lauter; Mary Scott; Sydney Mason; Francis X. Bushman; Pat Buttram
- Cinematography: William Bradford
- Edited by: James Sweeney
- Production company: Gene Autry Productions
- Distributed by: Columbia Pictures
- Release date: May 30, 1952
- Running time: 62 minutes
- Country: United States
- Language: English

Apache Country is a 1952 American Western film directed by George Archainbaud, written by Norman S. Hall and starring Gene Autry, Carolina Cotton, Harry Lauter, Mary Scott, Sydney Mason, Francis X. Bushman and Pat Buttram. The film was released on May 30, 1952 by Columbia Pictures.

== Cast ==
- Gene Autry as Gene Autry
- Carolina Cotton as Carolina Cotton
- Harry Lauter as Dave Kilrain
- Mary Scott as Laura Rayburn
- Sydney Mason as Walter Rayburn
- Francis X. Bushman as Commissioner Latham
- Pat Buttram as Pat Buttram
- Champion as Champ
