= Cow Town =

1950 film by John English

- Theatrical release poster
- Directed by: John English
- Written by: Gerald Geraghty
- Produced by: Armand Schaefer
- Starring: Gene Autry; Gail Davis; Harry Shannon; Jock Mahoney; Clark Burroughs; Harry Harvey Sr.
- Cinematography: William Bradford
- Edited by: Henry Batista
- Production company: Gene Autry Productions
- Distributed by: Columbia Pictures
- Release date: May 19, 1950
- Running time: 70 minutes
- Country: United States
- Language: English

Cow Town is a 1950 American Western film directed by John English and written by Gerald Geraghty. The film stars Gene Autry, Gail Davis, Harry Shannon, Jock Mahoney, Clark Burroughs and Harry Harvey Sr. It was released on May 19, 1950, by Columbia Pictures.

== Cast ==
- Gene Autry as Gene Autry
- Gail Davis as Ginger Kirby
- Harry Shannon as Sandy Reeves
- Jock Mahoney as Tod Jeffreys
- Clark Burroughs as Duke Kirby
- Harry Harvey Sr. as Sheriff Steve Calhoun
- Steve Darrell as Chet Hilliard
- Sandy Sanders as Stormy Jones
- Ralph Sanford as Martin Dalrymple
- Robert Hilton as Miller
- Bud Osborne as George Copeland
- House Peters Jr. as Gill Saunders
- Chuck Roberson as Mike Grady
- Champion as Champ
