= The Far Frontier =

1948 film by William Witney

- Starring: Roy Rogers
- Release date: 1948
- Country: United States
- Language: English

The Far Frontier is a 1948 American Western film starring Roy Rogers.

== Plot ==
Tom Sharper of the border patrol stops a truck to inspect its cargo. He is knocked cold by the drivers, who report back to their boss, Bart Carroll.

Coming from a cattle drive, rancher Roy Rogers hopes to visit his old friend Tom, but he's not there. Tom's dad is a former marshal who has tangled before with store owner Willis Newcomb, who is masterminding a scheme to transport U.S. criminal fugitives from Mexico prisons across the border.

Tom has amnesia. Bart decides to frame Tom by shooting a rancher with Tom's gun. He becomes the object of a manhunt, but Roy finds him first and is able to restore Tom's memory. Together, they fight Bart and Newcomb, and after it appears Tom has been killed by going over a cliff in a barrel, Roy saves the day and discovers that Tom is safe.

== Cast ==
- Roy Rogers as Roy
- Clayton Moore as Tom
- Gail Davis as Susan
- Andy Devine as Cookie
- Roy Barcroft as Bart
- Robert Strange as Newcomb
