= Gerald Geraghty =

American screenwriter (1906–1954)

- Born: August 10, 1906; Rushville, Indiana, U.S.
- Died: July 8, 1954 (aged 47); North Hollywood, California, U.S.
- Occupation: Screenwriter
- Years active: 1930–1954
- Parent: Thomas J. Geraghty
- Relatives: Maurice Geraghty (brother); Carmelita Geraghty (sister)

Gerald Geraghty (August 10, 1906 – July 8, 1954) was an American screenwriter, mostly of Westerns.

== Early life and family ==
Geraghty was born in Rushville, Indiana. His father was screenwriter Tom Geraghty. His brother Maurice was also a screenwriter; and his sister was silent film actress and painter Carmelita Geraghty. Geraghty and his family moved to Hollywood when he was young. He was a graduate of Hollywood High School and Princeton University.

== Career ==
Before he wrote for films, Geraghty wrote stories for magazines. Geraghty first worked with films as a writer of subtitles for the silent version of Street of Chance (1930).

Geraghty also wrote Gene Autry Rides, a Sunday newspaper comic strip that began in 1940 and ended in 1942.

== Personal life ==
Geraghty was married to the former Gretchen Darling, and they had a daughter, Erin. They were divorced on December 1, 1949. When he died, his wife was named Marcia, and he also had a son,

He died from a cerebral haemorrhage.

== Partial filmography ==
- Under the Tonto Rim (1933)
- Sunset Pass (1933)
- The Scoop (1934)
- Bar 20 Rides Again (1935)
- The Miracle Rider (1935)
- The Jungle Princess (1936)
- Wells Fargo (1937)
- Come On, Rangers (1938)
- Western Jamboree (1938)
- Southward Ho (1939)
- Mexicali Rose (1939)
- Blue Montana Skies (1939)
- In Old Caliente (1939)
- Mountain Rhythm (1939)
- Wall Street Cowboy (1939)
- In Old Monterey (1939)
- The Arizona Kid (1939)
- South of the Border (1939)
- Pioneers of the West (1940)
- Young Buffalo Bill (1940)
- Hidden Gold (1940)
- The Carson City Kid (1940)
- The Ranger and the Lady (1940)
- King of Dodge City (1941)
- Badlands of Dakota (1941)
- South of Tahiti (1941)
- Secret of the Wastelands (1941)
- Sunset on the Desert (1942)
- Sin Town (1942)
- Riding Through Nevada (1942)
- Hoppy Serves a Writ (1943)
- The Falcon Strikes Back (1943)
- Frontier Badmen (1943)
- Hail to the Rangers (1943)
- The Falcon and the Co-eds (1943)
- The Falcon in Hollywood (1944)
- Frisco Sal (1945)
- Shady Lady (1945)
- Along the Navajo Trail (1945)
- Rainbow Over Texas (1946)
- Apache Rose (1947)
- Wyoming (1947)
- Train to Alcatraz (1948)
- The Plunderers (1948)
- Grand Canyon Trail (1948)
- The Red Menace (1949)
- Riders in the Sky (1949)
- Mule Train (1950)
- Cow Town (1950)
- Trigger, Jr. (1950)
- Sunset in the West (1950)
- Trail of Robin Hood (1950)
- Silver Canyon (1951)
- The Hills of Utah (1951)
- Valley of Fire (1951)
- The Old West (1952)
- Barbed Wire (1952)
- Wagon Team (1952)
- Blue Canadian Rockies (1952)
- On Top of Old Smoky (1953)
- Iron Mountain Trail (1953)
- Savage Frontier (1953)
- Goldtown Ghost Riders (1953)
- Down Laredo Way (1953)
- Bandits of the West (1953)
- Shadows of Tombstone (1953)
- Red River Shore (1953)
- Phantom Stallion (1954)
