= Whirlwind (1951 film) =

1951 film by John English

- Theatrical release poster
- Directed by: John English
- Written by: Norman S. Hall
- Produced by: Armand Schaefer
- Starring: Gene Autry; Smiley Burnette; Gail Davis; Thurston Hall; Harry Lauter; Dick Curtis; Harry Harvey Sr. Stan Jones
- Cinematography: William Bradford
- Edited by: Paul Borofsky
- Production company: Gene Autry Productions
- Distributed by: Columbia Pictures
- Release date: April 16, 1951
- Running time: 70 minutes
- Country: United States
- Language: English

Whirlwind is a 1951 American Western film directed by John English, written by Norman S. Hall and starring Gene Autry, Gail Davis, Thurston Hall, Harry Lauter, Dick Curtis and Harry Harvey Sr. The film was released on April 16, 1951 by Columbia Pictures.

== Cast ==
- Gene Autry as Gene Autry aka The Whirlwind
- Smiley Burnette as Smiley Burnette
- Gail Davis as Elaine Lassiter
- Thurston Hall as Big Jim Lassiter
- Harry Lauter as Wade Trimble
- Dick Curtis as Lon Kramer
- Harry Harvey Sr. as Sheriff Barlow
- Gregg Barton as Bill Trask
- Stan Jones as himself
- Champion as Champ
