= Gail Davis =

American actress and horseback rider

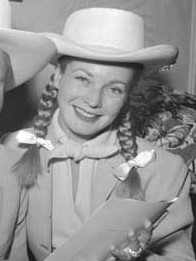
- Davis in 1956
- Born: Betty Jeanne Grayson; October 5, 1925; Little Rock, Arkansas, U.S.
- Died: March 15, 1997 (aged 71); Los Angeles, California, U.S.
- Resting place: Forest Lawn Memorial Park, Hollywood Hills, California
- Education: Harcum Junior College for Girls; University of Texas at Austin
- Occupation: Actress
- Years active: 1946–1961; 1994
- Spouses: Bob Davis (m. 1945; div. 1952) Richard Pierce (m. 1959; div. 1967) Carl Guerriero (m. 1971; died 1982)
- Children: 1

Gail Davis (born Betty Jeanne Grayson; October 5, 1925 – March 15, 1997) was an American actress and singer, best known for her starring role as Annie Oakley in the 1950s television series Annie Oakley.

== Life and career ==
=== Early years ===
The daughter of a small-town physician, Davis was born in Little Rock, Arkansas, but was raised in McGehee, Arkansas until her family moved to Little Rock.

She had been singing and dancing since childhood. After graduating from Little Rock High School, she studied at the Harcum Junior College for Girls in Bryn Mawr, Pennsylvania, and then completed her education at the University of Texas at Austin. She had a younger sister, Shirley Ann Grayson (August 26, 1937 – February 23, 1971).

=== Film ===
Betty Jeanne and her husband, Bob Davis, moved to Hollywood to pursue a film career. She told an interviewer how she acquired her professional acting name. "I went under contract to MGM around 1946. They told me 'we can't have a Betty Davis, because of Bette Davis, and we can't have a Betty Grayson because of Kathryn Grayson'.... Then a guy in the casting department said 'how about Gail Davis?' So that's where it came from."

In 1947, she made her motion picture debut in a comedy short film. She then appeared in minor roles in another four films, the first being The Romance of Rosy Ridge, then landed a supporting role to that of star Roy Rogers in the 1948 The Far Frontier. From 1948 to 53, Davis appeared in 32 feature films, all but three of which were in the Western genre. Twenty of the Western films were with Gene Autry, produced by his company, Gene Autry Productions, released and distributed by Columbia Pictures,

=== Television ===
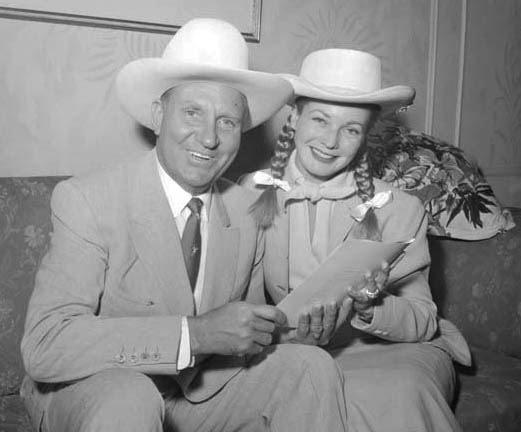
Gene Autry and Davis in Toronto, c. 1956

In 1950, Davis began to guest star in television Westerns, notably in The Cisco Kid, in which she appeared six times in two roles, including that of a niece whose uncle is trying to stop her pending marriage to a gangster. She guest-starred in 1950s episodes titled "Buried Treasure," "Friend in Need" and "Spanish Gold" of The Lone Ranger and twice each on The Range Rider, The Adventures of Kit Carson and Death Valley Days. Beginning in September 1950, through September 1954, she appeared in 15 episodes of The Gene Autry Show, sponsored by Wrigley's Doublemint gum.

Gail Davis was the answer to a long-held dream of Autry's—providing Western programming with a star to whom girls could relate. He said: "Little boys have had their idols ... from the beginning of the picture business.... Why not give the girls a Western star of their own?" Davis became that star, but on television rather than in movies, as Autry originally envisioned.

Between 1954 and 1957, Davis starred in the Annie Oakley series which ran for 81 episodes. An adroit horseback rider, Davis also toured North America in Gene Autry's traveling rodeo. She went on to manage other celebrities. In 1961, she made a guest appearance on The Andy Griffith Show (season 2, episode 8, titled "The Perfect Female") as Thelma Lou's cousin who was a champion skeet shooter.

She believed her success as Annie Oakley undermined other opportunities she might have had for other roles in the future. In 1982, she told a reporter "I tried to find other acting work, but I was so identified as Annie Oakley that directors would say, 'Gail, I'd like to hire you, but you're going to have to wait a few years, dye your hair and cut off your pigtails.' Directors just couldn't envision me in a sexy part or playing a heavy. I was always going to be Annie Oakley. So, as they say, I retired."

=== Recording ===
While Annie Oakley was popular on television, Davis made some recordings for Columbia and RCA Victor. Some were targeted toward children, and others were aimed at adults. However, Bob Leszczak wrote in his book, From Small Screen to Vinyl: A Guide to Television Stars Who Made Records, 1950-2000, "Even with two different musical avenues, none of the records caught on with the public."

=== Later years ===
Davis and her third husband, Carl Edward Guerriero, retired to the San Fernando Valley. During her retirement Davis made guest appearances at western memorabilia shows and film festivals. Her last public appearance was in 1994, when she received the Golden Boot award from the Motion Picture and Television Fund.

== Family ==
While at the University of Texas at Austin in 1945, she met and married her first husband, Bob Davis, with whom she had a daughter, Terrie. Their marriage ended in divorce in 1952. During her tenure on Annie Oakley, she had an affair with Gene Autry. On June 25, 1959, she married Richard Pierce, a recording executive, in Las Vegas, Nevada.

== Death ==
Davis, then a widow, died of cancer in Los Angeles at age 71. She is interred there in Forest Lawn Memorial Park in Hollywood Hills.

== Honors ==
For her contribution to the television industry, Gail Davis has a star on the Hollywood Walk of Fame at 6385 Hollywood Blvd. In 2004, she was inducted posthumously into the National Cowgirl Museum and Hall of Fame in Fort Worth, Texas. Davis' exhibit at the Cowgirl Hall of Fame recalls her impact on young girls through the Annie Oakley series:

"Back then I knew the show was having a positive impact, especially on little girls. It wasn't until years later that I realized just how much. Little girls had turned into influential women, thanking my portrayal of Annie for showing them the way."

== Selected filmography ==
- The Romance of Rosy Ridge (1947) - Baggett Daughter (uncredited)
- The Judge Steps Out (1948) - Young Mother with Baby Carriage (uncredited)
- If You Knew Susie (1948) - Ms. Gail (uncredited)
- They Live by Night (1948) - Girl at Parking Lot (uncredited)
- The Far Frontier (1948) - Susan Hathaway
- Death Valley Gunfighter (1949) - Trudy Clark
- Frontier Investigator (1949) - Janet Adams
- Law of the Golden West (1949) - Ann Calvert
- Brand of Fear (1949) - Anne Lamont
- South of Death Valley (1949) - Molly Tavish
- Sons of New Mexico (1949) - Eileen MacDonald
- Trail of the Rustlers (1950) - Mary Ellen Hyland
- West of Wyoming (1950) - Jennifer Draper
- Six Gun Mesa (1950) - Lynne Gregory
- Cow Town (1950) - Ginger Kirby
- Indian Territory (1950) - Melody Colton
- Operation Pacific (1951) - Minor Role (uncredited)
- Texans Never Cry (1951) - Nancy Carter
- Whirlwind (1951) - Elaine Lassiter
- Silver Canyon (1951) - Dell Middler
- Take Care of My Little Girl (1951) - Thelma (uncredited)
- Yukon Manhunt (1951) - Jane Kenmore
- Flying Leathernecks (1951) - Virginia Blithe (uncredited)
- Two Tickets to Broadway (1951) - Showgirl in Deli (uncredited)
- Valley of Fire (1951) - Laurie
- Overland Telegraph (1951) - Terry Muldoon
- The Old West (1952) - Arlie Williams
- Wagon Team (1952) - Connie Weldon
- Blue Canadian Rockies (1952) - Sandra Higbee
- Winning of the West (1953) - Ann Randolph
- On Top of Old Smoky (1953) - Jen Larrabee
- Goldtown Ghost Riders (1953) - Cathy Wheeler
- Pack Train (1953) - Jennifer Coleman
- Alias Jesse James (1959) - Annie Oakley (uncredited)

== Selected television ==
Year	Title	Role	Notes
1953	Death Valley Days	Mamie Jaggers	Season 1 Episode 5 "The Little Bullfrog Nugget"
1953	Death Valley Days		Season 1 Episode 18 "Land of the Free"
1954-1957	Annie Oakley	Annie Oakley	81 episodes
1961	The Andy Griffith Show	Thelma Lou's cousin Karen Moore.	Season 2, Episode 8, "The Perfect Female".
