= Mountain Rhythm (1939 film) =

- Theatrical release poster
- Directed by: B. Reeves Eason
- Screenplay by: Gerald Geraghty
- Story by: Connie Lee
- Produced by: Harry Grey (associate)
- Starring: Gene Autry; Smiley Burnette; June Storey
- Cinematography: Ernest Miller
- Edited by: Lester Orlebeck
- Music by: Raoul Kraushaar (supervisor)
- Production company: Republic Pictures
- Distributed by: Republic Pictures
- Release date: June 9, 1939 (U.S.)
- Running time: 59 minutes
- Country: United States
- Language: English

Mountain Rhythm is a 1939 American Western film directed by B. Reeves Eason, starring Gene Autry, Smiley Burnette, and June Storey. Based on a story by Connie Lee, the film is about a cowboy who organizes his fellow ranchers to oppose an Eastern promoter's land grab scheme.

== Plot ==
Aunt Mathilde "Ma" Hutchins (Maude Eburne) and the other ranchers of the valley are at risk of losing their ranches. Mr. Cavanaugh (Walter Fenner), an Eastern promoter, wants to develop a dude ranch on their land. In order to get their land, Cavanaugh arranges for the government to put up nearby public lands for auction—lands the ranchers use to graze their cattle. The auction would drive the ranchers out of business and allow Cavanaugh to acquire the land at a cheap price.

Gene Autry (Gene Autry) and Ma's nephew Frog Millhouse (Smiley Burnette) come to the rescue. Gene organizes the ranchers to pool their funds and sell their herds in order to raise enough money to bid on the land at auction. As Gene and Frog return with the proceeds from the cattle sale, they are ambushed by Cavanaugh's men, who steal the money. With the help of the hoboes in the valley, who are led by Judge Homer Worthington (Ferris Taylor) and Rocky (Jack Pennick), Gene stages another roundup using the hoboes as ranch hands. They round up enough cattle to buy the land at auction and save their valley.

== Cast ==
- Gene Autry as Gene Autry
- Smiley Burnette as Frog Millhouse
- Maude Eburne as Aunt Mathilde "Ma" Hutchins
- Ferris Taylor as Judge Homer Worthington
- Walter Fenner as Mr. Cavanaugh
- Jack Pennick as Rocky
- Hooper Atchley as Mr. Daniels
- Bernard Suss as MacCauley
- Ed Cassidy as Sheriff Dalrimple
- Jack Ingram as Henchman Ed Carney
- Tom London as Deputy Tom
- Roger Williams as Rancher Kimball
- Frankie Marvin as Cowhand Burt
- Slim Whitaker as Deputy Slim (uncredited)
- Champion as Gene's Horse (uncredited)

== Production ==
=== Stuntwork ===
- Ken Cooper (Gene's double)
- Jack Kirk (Smiley's double)
- Nellie Walker
- Joe Yrigoyen

=== Filming locations ===
- Iverson Ranch, 1 Iverson Lane, Chatsworth, Los Angeles, California, USA
- Walker Ranch
- Andy Jauregui Ranch, Placerita Canyon Road, Newhall, California, USA
- Barney Oldfield's Resort

=== Soundtrack ===
- "Highways Are Happy Ways (When They Lead the Way to Home)" (Larry Shay, Harry Harris, Tommie Malie) by Gene Autry, Smiley Burnette, Ferris Taylor, and Jack Pennick
- "It Makes No Difference Now" (Jimmie Davis, Floyd Tillman) by Gene Autry and Smiley Burnette in jail
- "It Was Only a Hobo's Dream" (Gene Autry, Johnny Marvin, Fred Rose) by Gene Autry (vocal) and Smiley Burnette (vocal and concertina)
- "Old MacDonald Had a Farm" (Traditional) by Gene Autry, Smiley Burnette, June Storey, and hotel guests on the hayride
- "The Old Grey Mare" (Traditional) by Gene Autry and hotel guests on the hayride
- "Long, Long Ago" (Thomas Haynes Bayley) by Gene Autry and hotel guests on the hayride
- "Oh, Dem Golden Slippers!" (James Allen Bland) by Gene Autry, Smiley Burnette, and hotel guests on the hayride
- "Put on Your Old Grey Bonnet" (Percy Wenrich, Stanley Murphy) by Gene Autry, Smiley Burnette, June Storey, and hotel guests on the hayride
- "Put on Your Old Grey Bonnet" (Reprise) by Gene Autry, Smiley Burnette, June Storey, Maude Eburne, Ferris Taylor, and Jack Pennick at the end
- "Gold Mine in Your Heart" (Gene Autry, Johnny Marvin, Fred Rose) by Gene Autry (vocal and guitar)
- "Knights of the Open Road" (Gene Autry, Johnny Marvin, Fred Rose) by the Hoboes, with Smiley Burnette on the concertina
