= Annie Oakley (TV series) =

Western Show

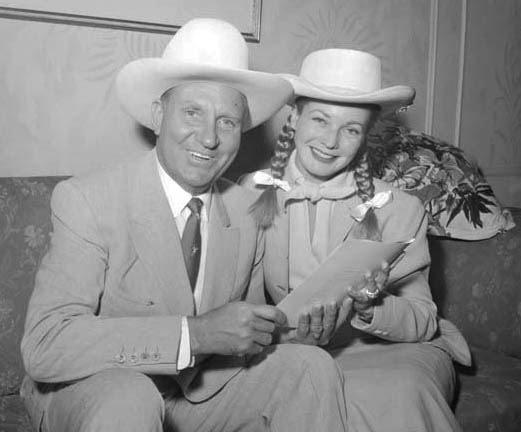
- Gene Autry was executive producer of Annie Oakley, and Gail Davis had the title role.
- Genre: Western
- Starring: Gail Davis; Brad Johnson; Jimmy Hawkins; Bob Woodward
- Composer: Erma E. Levin
- Country of origin: United States
- Original language: English
- No. of seasons: 3
- No. of episodes: 81

Production
- Executive producers: Gene Autry; Louis Gray; Armand Schaefer
- Producers: Colbert Clark; Louis Gray
- Cinematography: William Bradford; Joe Novak
- Running time: 25-minute episodes
- Production company: Flying A Productions

Original release
- Network: Syndication
- Release: January 9, 1954 – February 24, 1957

Annie Oakley is an American Western television series that fictionalizes the life of the famous Annie Oakley. (Except for depicting the protagonist as a phenomenal sharpshooter of the period, the program entirely ignores the facts of the historical Oakley's life.) Featuring actress Gail Davis in the title role, the weekly program ran from January 1954 to February 1957 in syndication. A total of 81 black-and-white episodes were produced, with each installment running 25 minutes in length. ABC aired daytime reruns of the series on Saturdays and Sundays from 1959 to 1960 and then again from 1964 to 1965.

== Synopsis ==
The series starred Gail Davis as Annie Oakley, with Brad Johnson as Deputy Sheriff Lofty Craig and Jimmy Hawkins as Annie's little brother, Tagg Oakley; Hawkins appeared in 80 of the series' 81 episodes. In the pilot episode, "Bull's Eye", Tagg is played by Billy Gray (better known for his role as James "Bud" Anderson, Jr. on the TV version of Father Knows Best). After playing Tagg in the Annie Oakley pilot, Gray joined the cast of Father Knows Best (which premiered in October 1954, nine months after the initial broadcast of Annie Oakley).

In the series, Annie Oakley rides a horse named Target: Tagg's horse is Pixie, and Lofty's mount is Forest. Annie and Tagg live in the fictional town of Diablo, Arizona with their uncle, Sheriff Luke MacTavish, who is frequently away when trouble starts; it is then up to straight-shooting Annie and her "silent suitor", Lofty Craig, to rescue law-abiding neighbors and arrest outlaws. Tagg is often told to stay in town and out of the way. When the need arises to relay important new information or capture by outlaws, he usually ends up in the middle of each episode's adventure.

Annie usually wears the same fringed cowgirl outfit, of which 15 (or more) copies were made during the show's production. She wears her hair in braided pigtails. Additional episodes were considered, but Hawkins had a growth spurt and outgrew his role as Annie's little brother. Annie Oakley was one of Gene Autry's Flying A Productions.

== Guest stars ==
Dick Tufeld appeared fifteen times in assorted roles during the course of the series; Harry Lauter, twelve times; Stanley Andrews and Gregg Barton, eleven times each; Myron Healey, ten times; Roy Barcroft, eight times; William Fawcett, prior to his role as Pete Wilkey in Fury, seven times; William Tannen, six times, and Don C. Harvey, five times.

- Richard Alexander as George Todd in "Annie and the Lacemaker" (1956)
- Chris Alcaide, as Paul Dodson in "Annie and the Brass Collar", as Vic in "The Cinder Trail", and as Duke Jaegar in "Outlaw Mesa" (all 1954)
- Roscoe Ates, as Curley Dawes in "Showdown at Diablo" (1956) and as Walsh in "Annie and the Miser" (1957)
- Jim Bannon, as Frank Jessup in "Flint and Steel" and as Ben Porter in "Tagg Oakley, Sheriff" (both 1956).
- John Beradino, professional baseball player-turned-actor, as Gorman in "Annie Rides the Navajo Trail" and as Roscoe Barnes in "Amateur Outlaw" (both 1956)
- James Best, as Scott Warren in "Outlaw Mesa" and as Jess Dugan in "Annie and the Outlaw's Son" (both 1954)
- Monte Blue, as Tom Wheeler in "Flint and Steel" and as Mr. Peabody in "Tagg Oakley, Sheriff" (both 1956)
- X Brands, as Randy in "Annie and the First Phone", as Tenanda in "Indian Justice", and as Peter Maher in "Annie Rings the Bell" (all 1956)
- Eve Brent, under the name of Jean Lewis, played Clara Bickel, girlfriend of Banker's employee in "Sure Shot Annie" in 1955
- Lane Chandler, appeared in the 1955 episode "Annie Breaks an Alibi" as a lawman
- Harry Cheshire, as Windy Smith in "Annie Breaks an Alibi" and as Judge Everard Bowen in "Annie and the Higher Court" (both 1955)
- Virginia Dale, appeared as Mrs Wiggins in "Flint and Steel" in 1956
- John Doucette, as Hugo Barrett in "Escape from Diablo" (1954) and as Duke Bailey in "Trouble Shooter" (1955)
- Lisa Gaye, appeared as the phony daughter in "Annie and the Lacemaker"
- Gary Gray as Bucky Donavan in "Annie and the Six o' Spades" (1954)
- James Griffith, as George Martin in "Annie Takes a Chance" and as Mark Banning in "Powder Rock Stampede" (both 1955)
- Ron Hagerthy, as Chuck Hutchins in the title role "The Waco Kid" and as Billy Stryker in "Annie Rings the Bell" (both 1956)
- I. Stanford Jolley as Walt, with Darryl Hickman as Chet Sterling, in "Annie Gets Her Man" (1954)
- Alan Hale, Jr., as Eli Gorham in "Annie Calls Her Shots" and as Moose Bosco in "Annie and the Silver Ace" (both 1954)
- Dick Jones, as Corporal Sam in "Annie Joins the Cavalry", as Bob Neil in "Annie Helps a Drifter", and as Steve Donavan in "Annie and the Six o'Spades" (all 1954) and as Clell Morgan in "Annie and the Junior Pioneers" (1955)
- L. Q. Jones portrayed Cal Upton in "The Robin Hood Kid" and Ned Blane in "Dilemma at Diablo" (both 1956)
- Douglas Kennedy appeared as Jim Hayward in "Annie Takes a Chance" and as Ralph Putnam in "Powder Rock Stampede" (both 1955).
- Harry Lauter played Will Davis in "The Reckless Press" (1956). A saddle tramp who is jailed for suspected murder.
- Nan Leslie played Alias Annie in "Alias Annie Oakley" (1954). The episode also stars Lane Bradford as Malcolm and Harry Lauter and Johnson.
- Keye Luke appeared as Li Wong, a Chinese laundryman and landowner, in the 1955 episode "Annie and the Chinese Puzzle", which touches on racial discrimination.
- Tyler MacDuff appeared in four episodes in 1956, including the title guest-starring role in "The Saga of Clement O'Toole" and as Don "Doc" Briggs in "Dilemma at Diablo".
- Tyler McVey appeared in the 1956 episode "Showdown at Diablo" in the role of Senator Ridgeway.
- Eve Miller appeared in the 1955 episode "Sure Shot Annie" in the role of Jane Lester. She appears to play a somewhat dubious Southern belle.She also appeared in the 1956 episode "The Reckless Press" as Kathy Stokes. Kathy marries a newspaper editor, but only after a tragedy and a near- tragedy.
- Ewing Mitchell, as Ab Forsyth in "Annie and the Twisted Trails" and Major Paley in "Santa Claus Wears a Gun" (both 1956) and Colonel Granger in "Dude's Decision" (1957)
- Fess Parker, as newspaper publisher Tom Conrad in "Annie and the Mystery Woman" and as Les Clinton in "Annie and the Texas Sandman" (both 1954)
- George Pembroke, played The Welshman in "Sharpshooting Annie" in 1954
- William Phipps, as George Wessel in "Sure Shot Annie (1955), as Dan Carter in "Annie and the Twisted Trails" (1956), and as Earl Wallace in "Dude's Decision (1957)
- Slim Pickens, as Sundown in "Annie and the Leprechauns", as Slim in "The Waco Kid", as Ed Morgan in "Annie Rings the Bell", and as Garner in "Grubstake Bank" (all 1956)
- Denver Pyle, as Dr. Barnes in "Valley of the Shadows" and as Tom Malloy in "Annie's Desert Adventure" (both 1954)
- Mike Ragan, four episodes, "The Runaways" (1954), "Thunder Hill" as henchman Walt Newman (1955), "Annie Rides the Navajo Trail" as Sgt. Yorkton (1956), and "Amateur Outlaw" (1956)
- Arthur Space, as Carl Bishop in "Valley of the Shadows" and as The Warden in "Annie's Desert Adventure" (both 1954)
- Glenn Strange, as Idaho in "Outlaw Brand" and as Ernie Barker in "Treasure Map" (both 1956)
- Lyle Talbot, as Pa Wiggins in "Flint and Steel" and as Colonel Dawson in "Tagg Oakley, Sheriff" (both 1956)
- Lee Van Cleef appeared as Tim Brennan in "Annie Breaks an Alibi" and as Amos Belcher in "Annie and the Higher Court" (both 1955).
- John War Eagle played Thunder Cloud in the 1956 episode "Indian Justice".
- Pierre Watkin, as Henry Lormier in "Dean Man's Bluff" (1955) and as the Reverend Mills in "The Reckless Press" (1956)
- Carleton G. Young, as the Sheriff in "Sundown Stage" (1956) and as Colonel Jackson in "The Dutch Gunmaker" (1957)

== Episodes ==
=== Season 1 (1954) ===
No. overall	No. in season	Title	Directed by	Written by	Original release date
1	1	"Annie and the Brass Collar"	William Berke	Robert Schaefer & Eric Freiwald	January 9, 1954
2	2	"Annie Trusts a Convict"	Frank McDonald	Norman S. Hall	January 16, 1954
3	3	"Gunplay"	Frank McDonald	Jack Townley	January 23, 1954
4	4	"The Dude Stagecoach"	Frank McDonald	Paul Gangelin	January 30, 1954
5	5	"Ambush Canyon"	Frank McDonald	Robert Schaefer & Eric Freiwald	February 6, 1954
6	6	"Annie Calls Her Shots"	Frank McDonald	Joe Richardson	February 13, 1954
7	7	"A Gal for Grandma"	Robert G. Walker	Joe Richardson	February 20, 1954
8	8	"Annie and the Silver Ace"	Frank McDonald	Joe Richardson	February 27, 1954
9	9	"Annie Finds Strange Treasure"	Frank McDonald	Norman S. Hall	March 6, 1954
10	10	"The Cinder Trail"	William Berke	Robert Schaefer & Eric Freiwald	March 13, 1954
11	11	"Valley of the Shadows"	Robert G. Walker	Robert Schaefer & Eric Freiwald	March 20, 1954
12	12	"Annie and the Lily Maid"	Frank McDonald	Paul Gangelin	March 27, 1954
13	13	"The Hardrock Trail"	Frank McDonald	Robert Schaefer & Eric Freiwald	April 3, 1954
14	14	"Annie Gets Her Man"	George Archainbaud	Norman S. Hall	April 10, 1954
15	15	"Justice Guns"	Frank McDonald	Robert Schaefer & Eric Freiwald	April 17, 1954
16	16	"Annie's Desert Adventure"	Robert G. Walker	Jack Townley	April 24, 1954
17	17	"Annie and the Mystery Woman"	George Archainbaud	Robert Schaefer & Eric Freiwald	May 1, 1954
18	18	"Annie and the Texas Sandman"	George Archainbaud	Robert Schaefer & Eric Freiwald	May 8, 1954
19	19	"Annie Meets Some Tenderfeet"	Robert G. Walker	Norman S. Hall	May 15, 1954
20	20	"Annie Joins the Cavalry"	George Archainbaud	John K. Butler	May 22, 1954
21	21	"Bull's Eye (Pilot)"	Wallace Fox	Dorothy Yost	May 29, 1954
22	22	"Annie Helps a Drifter"	George Archainbaud	Norman S. Hall	June 6, 1954
23	23	"Sharpshooting Annie"	George Archainbaud	Sam Roeca	June 12, 1954
24	24	"Annie Makes a Marriage"	George Archainbaud	David Lang	June 19, 1954
25	25	"Outlaw Mesa"	John English	Robert Schaefer & Eric Freiwald	June 26, 1954
26	26	"Annie and the Outlaw's Son"	John English	Robert Schaefer & Eric Freiwald	July 3, 1954

=== Season 2 (1954–1955) ===
No. overall	No. in season	Title	Directed by	Written by	Original release date
27	1	"Alias Annie Oakley"	George Archainbaud	Maurice Geraghty	July 10, 1954
28	2	"The Tomboy"	George Archainbaud	Robert Schaefer & Eric Freiwald	July 17, 1954
29	3	"The Runaways"	George Archainbaud	Robert Schaefer & Eric Freiwald	July 24, 1954
30	4	"Annie and the Six O'Spades"	Ray Nazarro	Paul Franklin	July 31, 1954
31	5	"Escape from Diablo"	Ray Nazarro	Robert Eric	August 7, 1954
32	6	"The Iron Smoke Wagon"	George Archainbaud	John K. Butler	August 14, 1954
33	7	"Annie and the Chinese Puzzle"	Ray Nazarro	Maurice Tombragel	February 13, 1955
34	8	"Annie Breaks an Alibi"	Ray Nazarro	Paul Gangelin	February 27, 1955
35	9	"Trigger Twins"	George Archainbaud	Robert Schaefer & Eric Freiwald	March 6, 1955
36	10	"Diablo Doctor"	George Archainbaud	Robert Schaefer & Eric Freiwald	March 13, 1955
37	11	"Dead Man's Bluff"	George Archainbaud	Paul Franklin & Ed Gardner	March 20, 1955
38	12	"Annie and the Junior Pioneers"	Ray Nazarro	Paul Franklin	March 27, 1955
39	13	"Hard Luck Ranch"	George Archainbaud	Dwight Cummins	April 3, 1955
40	14	"Thunder Hill"	George Archainbaud	Dwight Cummins	April 10, 1955
41	15	"Sure Shot Annie"	Ray Nazarro	Jack Townley	April 17, 1955
42	16	"Annie and the Widow's Might"	Ray Nazarro	Maurice Tombragel	April 24, 1955
43	17	"Trouble Shooter"	Ray Nazarro	Gerald D. Geraghty	May 1, 1955
44	18	"Annie Takes a Chance"	George Archainbaud	Robert Schaefer & Eric Freiwald	May 8, 1955
45	19	"Annie and the Higher Court"	Ray Nazarro	Paul Franklin	May 15, 1955
46	20	"Powder Rock Stampede"	George Archainbaud	Robert Schaefer & Eric Freiwald	May 22, 1955

=== Season 3 (1956–1957) ===
No. overall	No. in season	Title	Directed by	Written by	Original release date
47	1	"Sundown Stage"	Earl Bellamy	Robert Schaefer & Eric Freiwald	June 3, 1956
48	2	"Joker on Horseback"	Frank McDonald	Robert Schaefer & Eric Freiwald	June 10, 1956
49	3	"A Tall Tale"	George Archainbaud	Robert Schaefer & Eric Freiwald	June 17, 1956
50	4	"Annie and the Twisted Trails"	George Archainbaud	Paul Franklin	June 24, 1956
51	5	"The Robin Hood Kid"	George Archainbaud	Paul Franklin	July 1, 1956
52	6	"Annie and the Bicycle Riders"	George Archainbaud	Warren Wilson	July 8, 1956
53	7	"Annie and the Lacemaker"	George Archainbaud	Elizabeth Beecher	July 15, 1956
54	8	"Annie and the First Phone"	George Archainbaud	Warren Wilson	July 22, 1956
55	9	"Indian Justice"	George Archainbaud	Warren Wilson	July 29, 1956
56	10	"Showdown at Diablo"	George Archainbaud	Robert Schaefer & Eric Freiwald	August 5, 1956
57	11	"The Mississippi Kid"	Frank McDonald	Robert Schaefer & Eric Freiwald	August 12, 1956
58	12	"Renegade's Return"	Frank McDonald	Robert Schaefer & Eric Freiwald	August 19, 1956
59	13	"Sugarfoot Sue"	Frank McDonald	Robert Schaefer & Eric Freiwald	August 26, 1956
60	14	"Annie and the Leprechauns"	Frank McDonald	Victor Arthur	September 2, 1956
61	15	"Dilemma at Diablo"	George Archainbaud	Polly James	September 9, 1956
62	16	"Outlaw Brand"	Frank McDonald	J. Benton Cheney	September 16, 1956
63	17	"Shadow at Sonoma"	D. Ross Lederman	Robert Schaefer & Eric Freiwald	September 23, 1956
64	18	"Western Privateer"	George Archainbaud	Robert Schaefer & Eric Freiwald	September 30, 1956
65	19	"The Reckless Press"	D. Ross Lederman	John K. Butler	October 7, 1956
66	20	"Flint and Steel"	D. Ross Lederman	Norman S. Hall	October 14, 1956
67	21	"Tagg Oakley, Sheriff"	D. Ross Lederman	John K. Butler	October 21, 1956
68	22	"The Waco Kid"	Ray Nazarro	Maurice Geraghty	October 28, 1956
69	23	"The Saga of Clement O'Toole"	Ray Nazarro	Robert Schaefer & Eric Freiwald	November 4, 1956
70	24	"The Front Trail"	Ray Nazarro	Robert Schaefer & Eric Freiwald	November 11, 1956
71	25	"Annie Rides the Navajo Trail"	D. Ross Lederman	John K. Butler	November 18, 1956
72	26	"Annie Rings the Bell"	Ray Nazarro	John K. Butler	November 25, 1956
73	27	"Santa Claus Wears a Gun"	Ray Nazarro	John K. Butler	December 2, 1956
74	28	"Amateur Outlaw"	D. Ross Lederman	Paul Gangelin	December 9, 1956
75	29	"Grubstake Bank"	Frank McDonald	Orville H. Hampton	December 16, 1956
76	30	"Treasure Map"	Frank McDonald	Dwight Cummins	December 30, 1956
77	31	"Annie and the Miser"	George Archainbaud	Paul Gangelin	January 20, 1957
78	32	"Tuffy"	George Archainbaud	Paul Gangelin	February 3, 1957
79	33	"Dude's Decision"	George Archainbaud	Ty Cobb & Victor Arthur	February 10, 1957
80	34	"The Dutch Gunmaker"	Earl Bellamy	Robert Schaefer & Eric Freiwald	February 17, 1957
81	35	"Desperate Men"	George Archainbaud	Dwight Cummins	February 24, 1957

== Release ==
=== Home media ===
Approximately two dozen episodes lapsed into the public domain and are currently available on DVD in North America (including several releases issued through Davis's estate) and elsewhere.

On March 31, 2009, Mill Creek Entertainment released Gun Justice Featuring The Lone Ranger, with other television Westerns such as Annie Oakley.

VCI Entertainment released the complete series on DVD in Region 1 for the first time on October 21, 2014.

== Media ==
=== Comics ===
A number of American comics were based on the TV series:

- Annie Oakley and Tagg 4-18 (1953–1959) by Dell Comics
- Annie Oakley and Tagg 1 (1965) by Gold Key Comics

Many of these issues were later reprinted in black and white by L. Miller and World Distributors Ltd.

=== Books ===
At least three "Authorized TV Adventures" were published by Whitman Publishing Company.

- Annie Oakley in Danger at Diablo, by Doris Schroeder, 1955
- Annie Oakley in Double Trouble, by Doris Schroeder, 1958
- Annie Oakley in Ghost Town Secret, by Doris Schroeder, 1957
