= Gene Autry =

American actor (1907–1998)

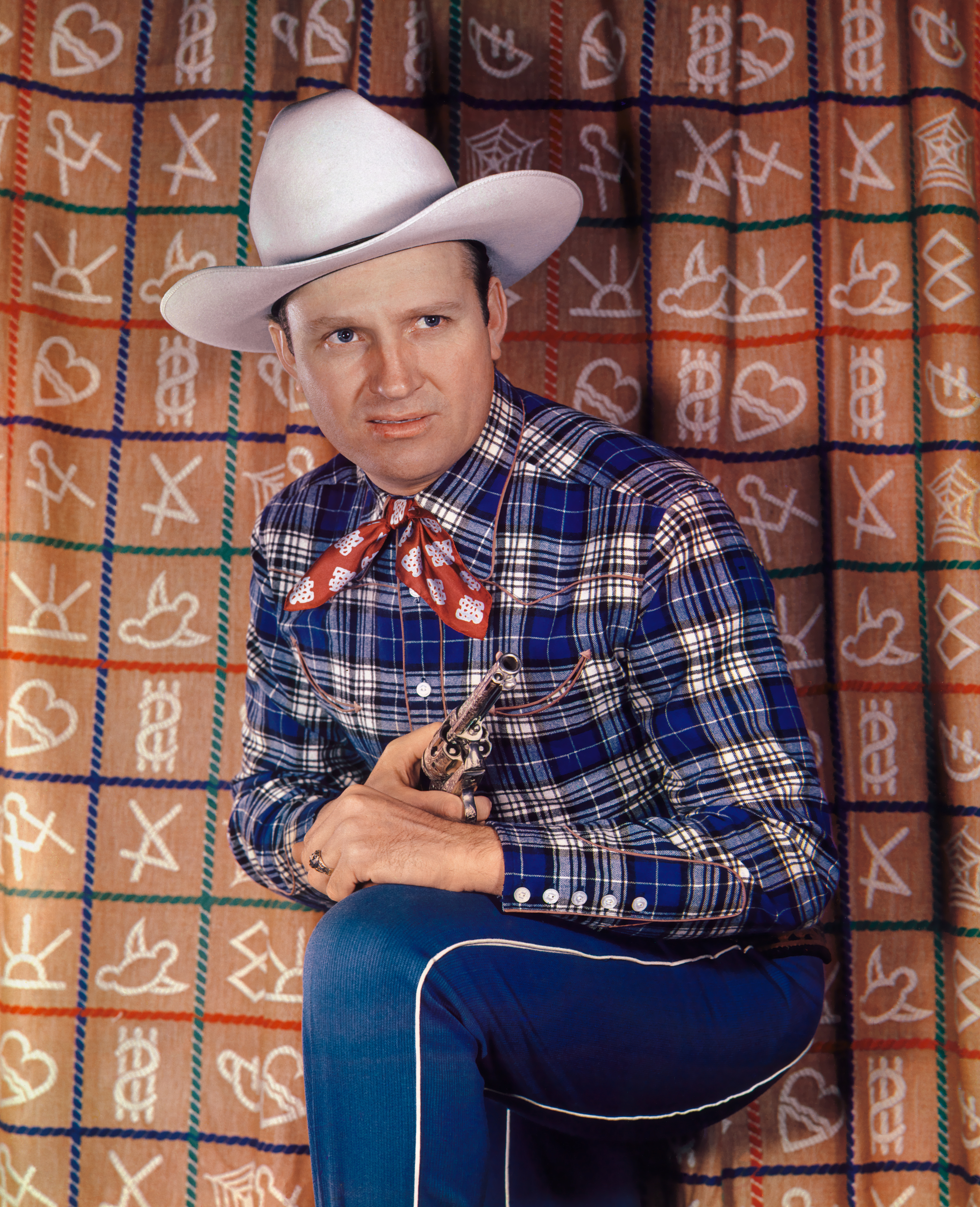
- Autry in 1942
- Born: Orvon Grover Autry; September 29, 1907; Tioga, Texas, U.S.
- Died: October 2, 1998 (aged 91); Los Angeles, California, U.S.
- Burial place: Forest Lawn Memorial Park, Hollywood Hills, California
- Other names: The Singing Cowboy; Gene Michaels
- Occupations: Actor; musician; singer; composer; rodeo performer; baseball owner
- Years active: 1925–1964
- Spouses: Ina Mae Spivey (m. 1932; died 1980); Jacqueline Ellam (m. 1981)
- Relatives: Randy Quaid (first cousin twice removed); Dennis Quaid (first cousin twice removed); Jack Quaid (first cousin three times removed); Jenna Davis (great grand-niece)
- Awards: Hollywood Walk of Fame
- Musical career
- Genres: Country; western
- Instruments: Guitar; vocals
- Labels: Columbia; Okeh; Perfect; Conqueror; Victor
- Awards: Country Music Hall of Fame; National Radio Hall of Fame
- Website: geneautry.com

Orvon Grover "Gene" Autry (September 29, 1907 – October 2, 1998), nicknamed the Singing Cowboy, was an American actor, musician, singer, composer, rodeo performer, and baseball team owner, who largely gained fame by singing in a crooning style on radio, in films, and on television for more than three decades, beginning in the early 1930s. During that time, he personified the straight-shooting hero—honest, brave, and true.

Autry was the owner of a television station and several radio stations in Southern California. From 1961 to 1997, he was the founding owner of the California Angels (Note: The franchise was originally known as the Los Angeles Angels from its founding in 1961 until its move to Anaheim, California, in 1966 when it adopted the California moniker. The franchise has adopted several different monikers since Autry's ownership, including Anaheim Angels, Los Angeles Angels of Anaheim, and a return to Los Angeles Angels.) franchise of Major League Baseball (MLB).

From 1934 to 1953, Autry appeared in 93 motion pictures. Between 1950 and 1956, he hosted The Gene Autry Show television series. In many of them, he appeared with Champion, his Morgan horse.

Autry was also one of the most important pioneering figures in the history of country music, considered the second major influential artist in the genre's development after Jimmie Rodgers in terms of chronology. His films were the first media vehicle to carry Western music to a nationwide audience.

In addition to his signature song "Back in the Saddle Again", as well as his recording hit "At Mail Call Today", Autry is still remembered for his association with Christmas music, having debuted the seasonal standards "Rudolph, the Red-Nosed Reindeer", "Frosty the Snowman", and "Here Comes Santa Claus".

Autry is a member of both the Country Music Hall of Fame and the Nashville Songwriters Hall of Fame. He is the only person to be awarded stars in all then-five categories on the Hollywood Walk of Fame, for film, television, music, radio, and live performance. (Note: The sixth category, sports entertainment, was added in 2023.)

The town of Gene Autry, Oklahoma, was named in his honor, as was the Gene Autry precinct in Mesa, Arizona.

== Life and career ==
=== Early years ===
Autry was born September 29, 1907, near Tioga in Grayson County, Texas, the grandson of a Baptist preacher. His parents, Delbert Autry and Elnora Ozment, moved in the 1920s to Ravia in Johnston County in southern Oklahoma. Gene Autry worked on his father's ranch while growing up and going to school. In 1925, Autry left the family ranch. With only his high school education, Autry became a telegrapher for the St. Louis–San Francisco Railway. His talent at singing and playing guitar led to performing at local dances.

=== Singing career ===
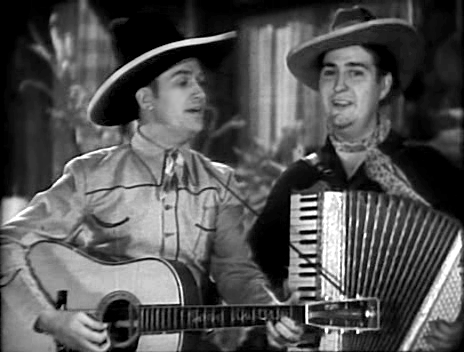
Gene Autry with Smiley Burnette, 1934

While working as a telegraph operator in Chelsea, Oklahoma, Autry would sing and accompany himself on the guitar to pass the lonely hours, especially when he had the midnight shift. This later got him fired. One night, he was encouraged to sing professionally by a customer, humorist Will Rogers, who had heard him singing.

As soon as he could save money to travel, he went to New York. In the autumn of 1928, he auditioned for the Victor Talking Machine Company, shortly before purchase by David Sarnoff's Radio Corporation of America (RCA). According to Nathaniel Shilkret, director of Light Music for Victor at the time, Autry asked to speak to Shilkret after finding that he had been turned down. Shilkret explained to Autry that he was turned down not because of his voice, but because Victor had just made contracts with two similar singers. Autry left with a letter of introduction from Shilkret and the advice to sing on radio to gain experience and to come back in a year or two. In 1928, Autry was singing on Tulsa radio station KVOO (now KOTV) as "Oklahoma's Yodeling Cowboy". The Victor archives show an October 9, 1929, entry stating that the vocal duet of Jimmie Long and Gene Autry with two Hawaiian guitars, directed by L. L. Watson, recorded "My Dreaming of You" (Matrix 56761) and "My Alabama Home" (Matrix 56762).

Autry signed a recording deal with Columbia Records in 1929. He worked in Chicago on the WLS-AM radio show National Barn Dance for four years, and with his own show, where he met singer-songwriter Smiley Burnette. In his early recording career, Autry covered various genres, including a labor song, "The Death of Mother Jones", in 1931.

Autry also recorded many "hillbilly"-style records in 1930 and 1931 in New York City, which were certainly different in style and content from his later recordings. These were much closer in style to the Prairie Ramblers or Dick Justice, and included the "Do Right, Daddy Blues" and "Black Bottom Blues", both similar to "Deep Elem Blues". These late Prohibition-era songs deal with bootlegging, corrupt police, and women whose occupation was certainly vice. These recordings are generally not heard today, but are available on European import labels, such as JSP Records. His first hit was in 1932 with "That Silver-Haired Daddy of Mine", a duet with fellow railroad man Jimmy Long that Autry and Long co-wrote.

As Autry's movie career flourished, so did his record sales. His unofficial theme song became the Ray Whitley composition "Back in the Saddle Again". Autry made 640 recordings, including more than 300 songs written or co-written by himself. His records sold more than 100 million copies and he has more than a dozen gold and platinum records, including the first record ever certified gold.

Today's listeners associate Gene Autry with Christmas songs, which are played perennially during each holiday season. These include "Santa Claus Is Comin' to Town", his own composition "Here Comes Santa Claus", "Frosty the Snowman", "Up on the Housetop", and his biggest hit, "Rudolph, the Red-Nosed Reindeer". He wrote "Here Comes Santa Claus" after being the Grand Marshal of the 1946 Santa Claus Lane Parade (now the Hollywood Christmas Parade). He heard all of the spectators watching the parade saying, "Here comes Santa Claus!" virtually handing him the title for his song. He recorded his version of the song in 1947 and it became an instant classic.

In the late 1950s, he began recording other artists, as the original owner of Challenge Records. The label's biggest hit was "Tequila" by The Champs in 1958, which started the rock and roll instrumental craze of the late 1950s and early 1960s. He sold the label soon after, but the maroon (later green) label has the "GA" in a shield above the label name.

=== Film career ===
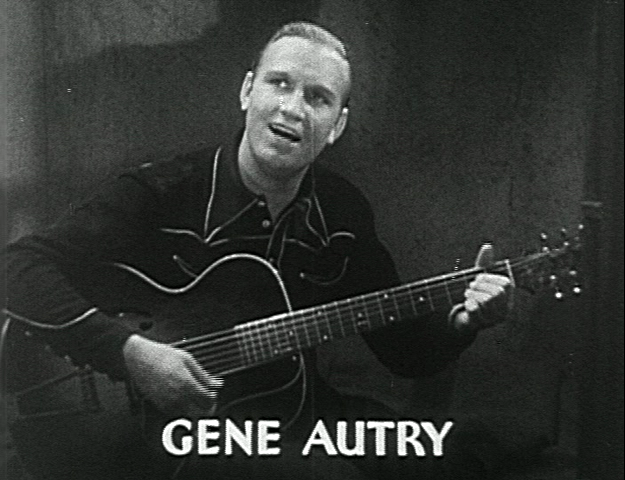
Gene Autry in Oh, Susanna!, 1936

Autry and Burnette were discovered by film producer Nat Levine in 1934. Together, Autry and Burnette made their film debut for Mascot Pictures Corp. in In Old Santa Fe as part of a singing cowboy quartet; he was then given the starring role by Levine in 1935 in the 12-part serial The Phantom Empire. Shortly thereafter, Mascot was absorbed by the newly formed Republic Pictures Corp. and Autry went along to make a further 44 films up to 1940. Most were low-budget Westerns in which he played under his own name, rode his horse Champion, had Smiley Burnette as his regular sidekick, and had many opportunities to sing in each film. His films were tremendously successful, so much so that almost every other studio tried to compete by showcasing their own singing cowboys. By 1940 Autry was Republic's biggest star, and his films became more costly and more elaborate. They played first-run in large cities, unlike the usual "B" westerns that played in neighborhood theaters.

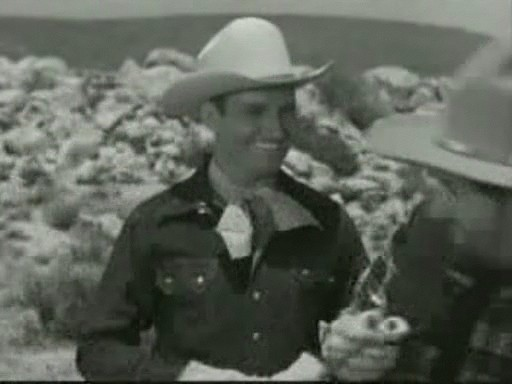
Gene Autry in The Gene Autry Show episode "The Black Rider", 1950

In the Motion Picture Herald Top Ten Money-Making Western Stars poll, Autry was listed every year from the first poll in 1936 to 1942 and 1946 to 1954 (he was serving in the AAF 1943–45), holding first place 1937 to 1942, and second place (after Roy Rogers) 1947 to 1954, when the poll ceased. He appeared in the similar Boxoffice poll from 1936 to 1955, holding first place from 1936 to 1942 and second place (after Rogers) from 1943 to 1952. While these two polls are really an indication only of the popularity of series stars, Autry also appeared in the Top Ten Money Making Stars Poll of all films from 1940 to 1942, His Gene Autry Flying "A" Ranch Rodeo show debuted in 1940.

Autry served in the U. S. Army Air Corps during World War II. Part of his military service included his broadcast of a radio show for one year; it involved music and true stories. Several decades ago on an early afternoon show featuring Republic westerns, one of Gene's sidekicks said that when Gene told Republic Pictures of his intentions to join the military during World War II, Republic threatened to promote Roy Rogers as "King of the Cowboys" in Gene's absence, which it did. Republic reissued old Autry westerns during the war years, to keep his name before the public.

Autry's contract had been suspended for the duration of his military service, and he had tried to have it declared void after his discharge. The courts found in Republic's favor, and Autry returned to Republic after the war. He finished out his contract with four more features, with Autry now publicized as "King of the Singing Cowboys".

In 1947, Autry left Republic for Columbia Pictures, which offered him his own production unit. Hs former sidekick Smiley Burnette was then working in Columbia's Durango Kid westerns with Charles Starrett, and was unavailable. Autry chose a new sidekick, Pat Buttram, recently returned from his World War II service. Buttram would co-star with Gene Autry in more than 40 films and in more than 100 episodes of Autry's television show. In 1951, Autry formed his own company (Flying A Productions) to make westerns under his own control. After Charles Starrett retired in 1952, Columbia reassigned Burnette to the six remaining films in its Gene Autry series, reuniting Burnette with his former partner. Columbia continued to distribute the Autry westerns through 1953, and reissued them to theaters in the late 1950s.

==== Melody Ranch ====
Autry purchased the 110-acre Monogram Ranch in 1953, in Placerita Canyon near Newhall, California, in the northern San Gabriel Mountains foothills. He renamed it the Melody Ranch after his movie Melody Ranch. Autry then sold 98 acres of the property, most of the original ranch. The Western town, adobes, and ranch cabin sets and open land for location shooting were retained as a movie ranch on 12 acres. Numerous "B" Westerns and TV shows were shot there during Autry's ownership, including the initial years of Gunsmoke with James Arness. A decade after he purchased Melody Ranch, a brushfire swept through in August 1962, destroying most of the original standing sets and dashing Autry's plans to turn it into a museum. However, the devastated landscape did prove useful for productions such as Combat!. A complete adobe ranch survived at the northeast section of the ranch.

According to a published story by Autry, the fire caused him to turn his attention to Griffith Park, where he would build his Museum of Western Heritage (now known as the Autry Museum of the American West).

In 1990, after his favorite horse Champion Three, which lived in retirement there, died, Autry put the remaining 12-acre ranch up for sale. It was purchased by the Veluzat family in 1991 and rebuilt. It is now known as the Melody Ranch Motion Picture Studio and Melody Ranch Studios on 22 acres. The ranch has the Melody Ranch Museum open year-round; and one weekend a year, the entire ranch is open to the public during the Cowboy Poetry and Music Festival, another legacy of Autry's multiple talents.

=== Radio and television career ===
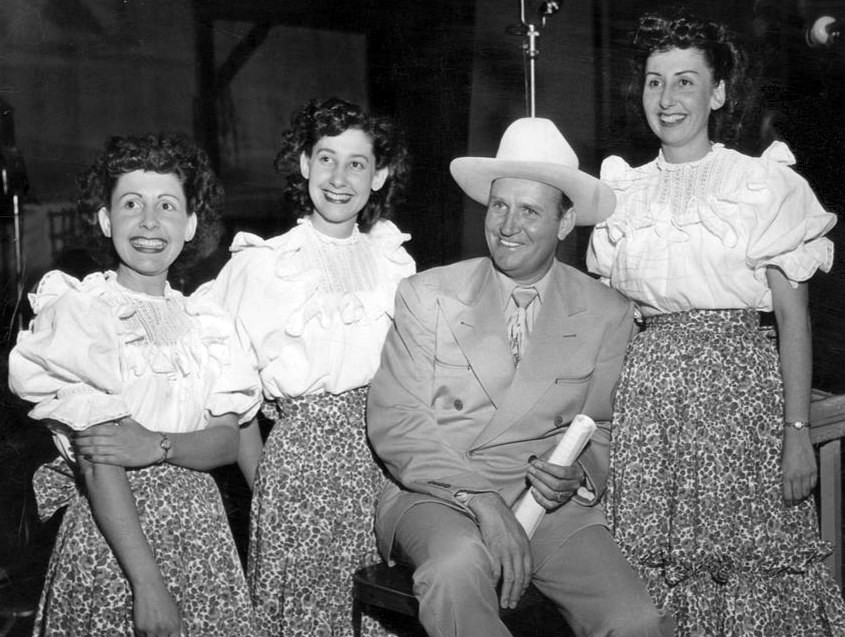
Gene Autry with the Pinafores, who sang on his weekly radio show, 1948

From 1940 to 1956, Autry had a huge hit with a weekly show on CBS Radio, Gene Autry's Melody Ranch. His horse, Champion, also had a Mutual radio series, The Adventures of Champion and a CBS-TV series of the same name. In response to his many young radio listeners aspiring to emulate him, Autry created the Cowboy Code, or Ten Cowboy Commandments. These tenets promoting an ethical, moral, and patriotic lifestyle that appealed to youth organizations such as the Boy Scouts, which developed similar doctrines. The Cowboy Code consisted of rules that were "a natural progression of Gene's philosophies going back to his first Melody Ranch programs—and early pictures." According to the code:

1. The Cowboy must never shoot first, hit a smaller man, or take unfair advantage.
2. He must never go back on his word, or a trust confided in him.
3. He must always tell the truth.
4. He must be gentle with children, the elderly, and animals.
5. He must not advocate or possess racially or religiously intolerant ideas.
6. He must help people in distress.
7. He must be a good worker.
8. He must keep himself clean in thought, speech, action, and personal habits.
9. He must respect women, parents, and his nation's laws.
10. The Cowboy is a patriot.

Beginning in 1950, he produced and starred in his own television show on CBS through his Flying A Productions studio. In the late 1950s, Autry also made several appearances on ABC-TV's Jubilee USA.

=== Military career ===
During World War II, Autry enlisted in the United States Army in 1942, and became a tech sergeant in the United States Army Air Corps. Holding a private pilot certificate, he was determined to become a military pilot and earned his Service Pilot rating in June 1944, serving as a C-109 transport pilot with the rank of flight officer. Assigned to a unit of the Air Transport Command, he flew as part of the dangerous airlift operation over the Himalayas between India and China, nicknamed the Hump.

=== Rodeo ===
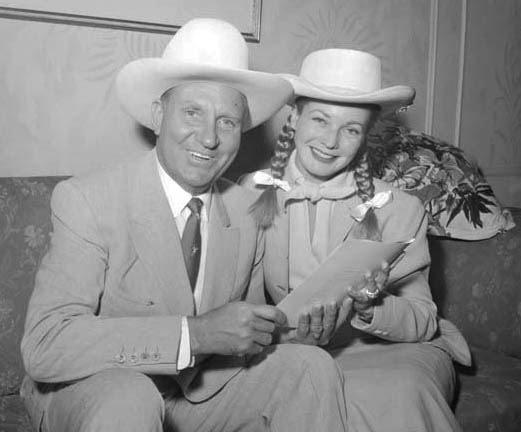
Gene Autry and Gail Davis in Toronto, 1956

In 1941, at the height of his screen popularity, Autry had a string of rodeo stock based north of Ardmore, Oklahoma. It was known as the Flying A Ranch and encompassed 1200 acres. It served as headquarters for his traveling rodeo. The nearby town of Berwyn, then honored Autry by naming the town after him. Thirty Five thousand people attended the ceremony on November 16, 1941. A year later, he became a partner in the World Championship Rodeo Company, which furnished livestock for many of the country's major rodeos. In 1954, he acquired Montana's top bucking string from the estate of Leo J. Cremer Sr., and put Canadian saddle bronc riding champion Harry Knight in charge of the operation. A merger with the World Championship Rodeo Company in 1956 made Autry the sole owner. He moved the entire company to a 24,000-acre (97 km^{2}) ranch near Fowler, Colorado, with Knight as the working partner in the operation. For the next 12 years, they provided livestock for most of the major rodeos in Texas, Colorado, Montana, and Nebraska. When the company was sold in 1968, both men continued to be active in rodeo. For his work as a livestock contractor, Autry was inducted into the Professional Rodeo Cowboys Association's ProRodeo Hall of Fame in 1979. Autry received several honors for his contributions to rodeo.

==== Honors ====
- 1972: Hall of Great Western Performers of the National Cowboy & Western Heritage Museum
- 1979: ProRodeo Hall of Fame
- 1980: Hall of Great Westerners of the National Cowboy Hall of Fame and Western Heritage Center
- 1988: Texas Trail of Fame
- 2013: Texas Rodeo Cowboy Hall of Fame

=== Gene Autry comics ===
Gene Autry was often portrayed in the comics, primarily during the heyday of Western-themed comics, the 1940s and 1950s.

The Register and Tribune Syndicate comic strip Gene Autry Rides by Till Goodan was the first entry, lasting from 1940 to 1941. From 1941 to 1943, Autry was the subject of a comic book initially published by Fawcett Comics and then picked up by Dell Comics that ran 12 issues. Dell then published 101 issues of Gene Autry Comics from 1946 to 1955. That title was changed to Gene Autry and Champion, and ran an additional 20 issues from 1955 to 1959, making it the longest-running (by number of issues) cowboy actor comic book.

Meanwhile, Autry was the subject of an "Air-Western-Adventure Strip" comic strip syndicated by General Features from 1952 to 1955. The strip was produced in association with Whitman Publishing.

The Mexican publisher Editorial Novaro released 423 issues of Gene Autry comics from 1954 to 1984.

=== Toys ===
In 1937, Kenton Hardware Company of Kenton, Ohio, began producing Gene Autry cast-iron cap guns as a part of its line of iron toys. The toy was commissioned by Kenton vice-president Willard Bixler, who had conceptualized an iron cap revolver modeled after the pearl-handled gun used by Gene Autry. Selling at 50 cents per gun (equivalent to $11 in 2025), the cap pistols were extremely popular and by 1939, two million units of the toy had been sold in the United States and abroad. Autry received a portion of all sales revenues.

=== Baseball ===
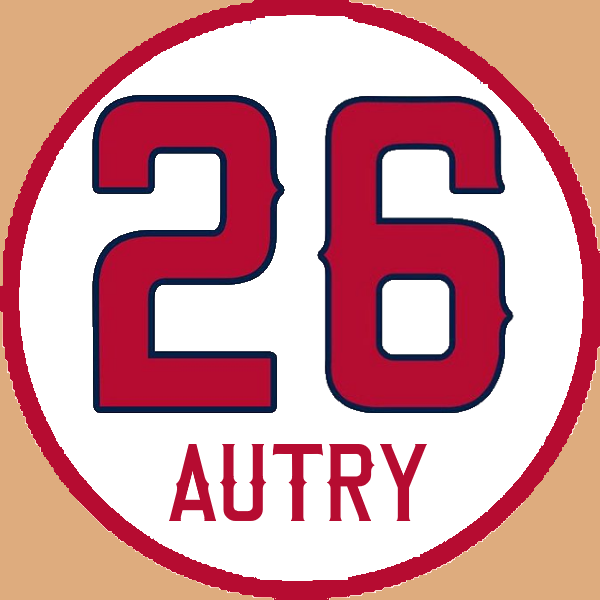
Gene Autry's number 26 was retired by the California Angels in 1982.

In the 1950s, Autry had been a minority owner of the minor-league Hollywood Stars. In 1960, when Major League Baseball announced plans to add an expansion team in Los Angeles, Autry—who had once declined an opportunity to play in the minor leagues—expressed an interest in acquiring the radio broadcast rights to the team's games. Baseball executives were so impressed by his approach that he was persuaded to become the owner of the franchise rather than simply its broadcast partner. The team, initially called the Los Angeles Angels upon its 1961 debut, moved to suburban Anaheim in 1966, and was renamed the California Angels, then the Anaheim Angels from 1997 until 2005, when it became the Los Angeles Angels of Anaheim. Autry served as vice president of the American League from 1983 until his death. In 1995, he sold a quarter share of the team to the Walt Disney Company and a controlling interest the following year, with the remaining share to be transferred after his death. Earlier, in 1982, he sold Los Angeles television station KTLA for $245 million. He also sold several radio stations he owned, including KSFO in San Francisco, KMPC in Los Angeles, KOGO in San Diego, and other stations in the Golden West radio network.

The number 26 was retired by the Angels in Autry's honor. The chosen number reflected that baseball's rosters (at the time) had 25 men, so Autry's unflagging support for his team made him the "26th man" (see also the 12th man, a similar concept in football). When the Angels finally won their first (and to date, only) World Series championship in 2002, star outfielder Tim Salmon held Autry's cowboy hat aloft during the on-field celebration, and the public address system played his hit song, "Back in the Saddle Again".

=== Hotels ===
He invested in property, owning by 1964 the Mark Hopkins Hotel in San Francisco; the Hotel Continental in Hollywood; the Sahara Inn, a $12-million motel near Chicago; plus property in Palm Springs.

=== Retirement ===
Autry retired from show business in 1964, having made almost 100 films up to 1955 and over 600 records. He was elected to the Country Music Hall of Fame in 1969 and to the Nashville Songwriters Hall of Fame in 1970. After retiring, he invested widely in real estate, radio, and television. He also invested in ownership of the KOOL-TV CBS-affiliate (now Fox affiliate KSAZ-TV) in Phoenix, Arizona, which created local shows such as the weekly bilingual children's show Niños Contentos.

Republic Pictures, its finances failing, had shut down production in 1957. By the late 1960s Republic was barely operational, managing only its film library. Gene Autry, correctly assessing the company's cash-poor situation, made a cash offer for the rights and negatives to his Republic films. The company accepted Autry's terms, and Autry now controlled the film materials for home-movie reprints and home-video tapes and discs.

=== Death ===
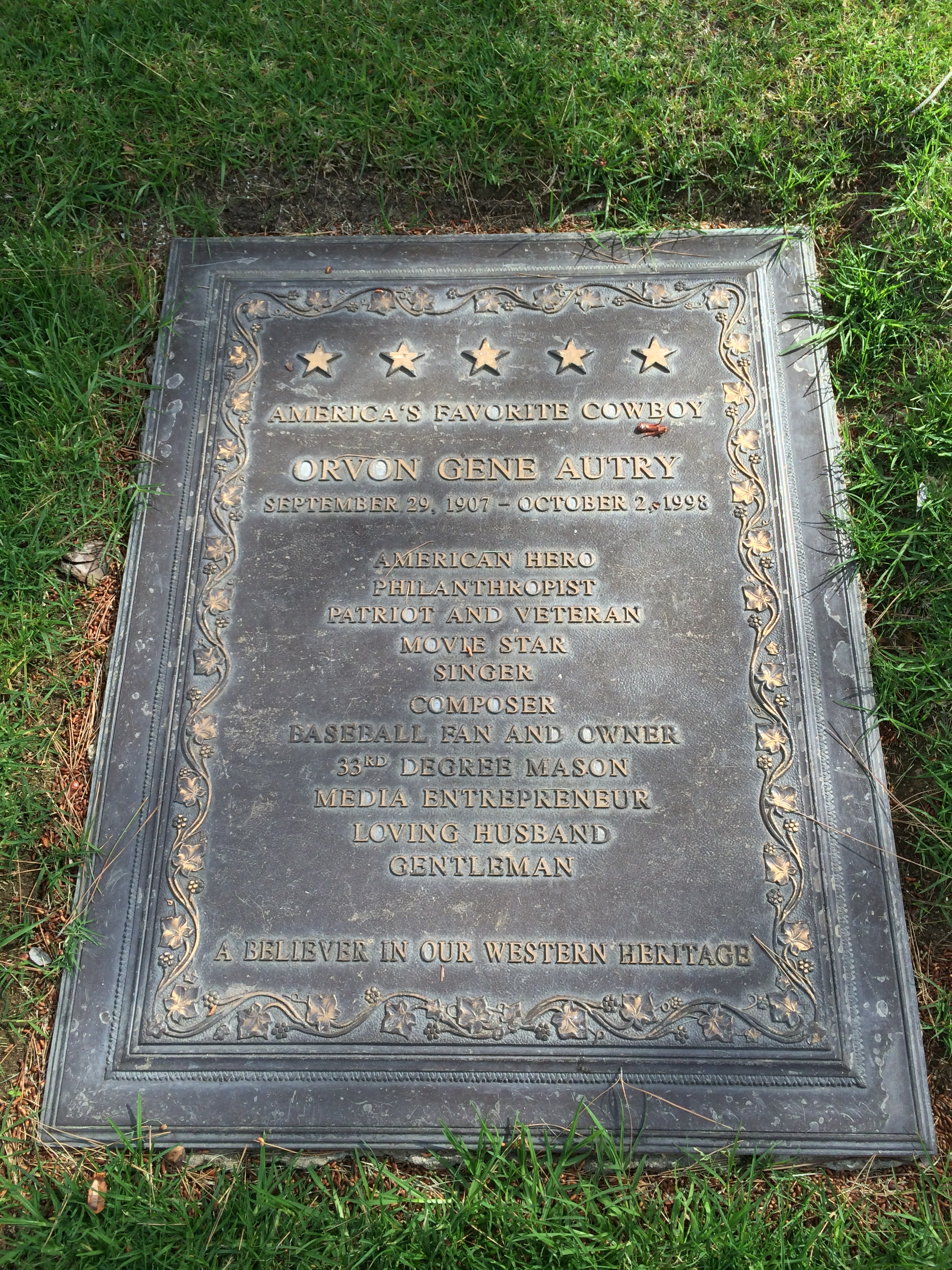
Grave of Gene Autry at Forest Lawn Hollywood Hills

Autry died on October 2, 1998, at his home in Studio City, Los Angeles, from lymphoma. He was buried at the Forest Lawn, Hollywood Hills Cemetery in Los Angeles. His epitaph read, "America's Favorite Cowboy ... American Hero, Philanthropist, Patriot and Veteran, Movie Star, Singer, Composer, Baseball Fan and Owner, 33rd Degree Mason, Media Entrepreneur, Loving Husband, Gentleman".

== Personal life ==
In 1932, Autry married Ina Mae Spivey, the niece of Jimmy Long. During this marriage he had a sustained affair with Gail Davis, the actress who played Annie Oakley in the television series of the same name that Autry produced. After Spivey died in 1980, he married Jacqueline Ellam, who had been his banker, in 1981.

While Autry was quiet about his political views during his life, his voting records listed him as a registered Republican, and he supported the Civil Rights Movement.

Autry was raised into Freemasonry in 1927 at Catoosa Lodge No. 185, Catoosa Oklahoma. He later became a 33rd degree Scottish Rite Mason, as recorded on his headstone.

== Legacy ==
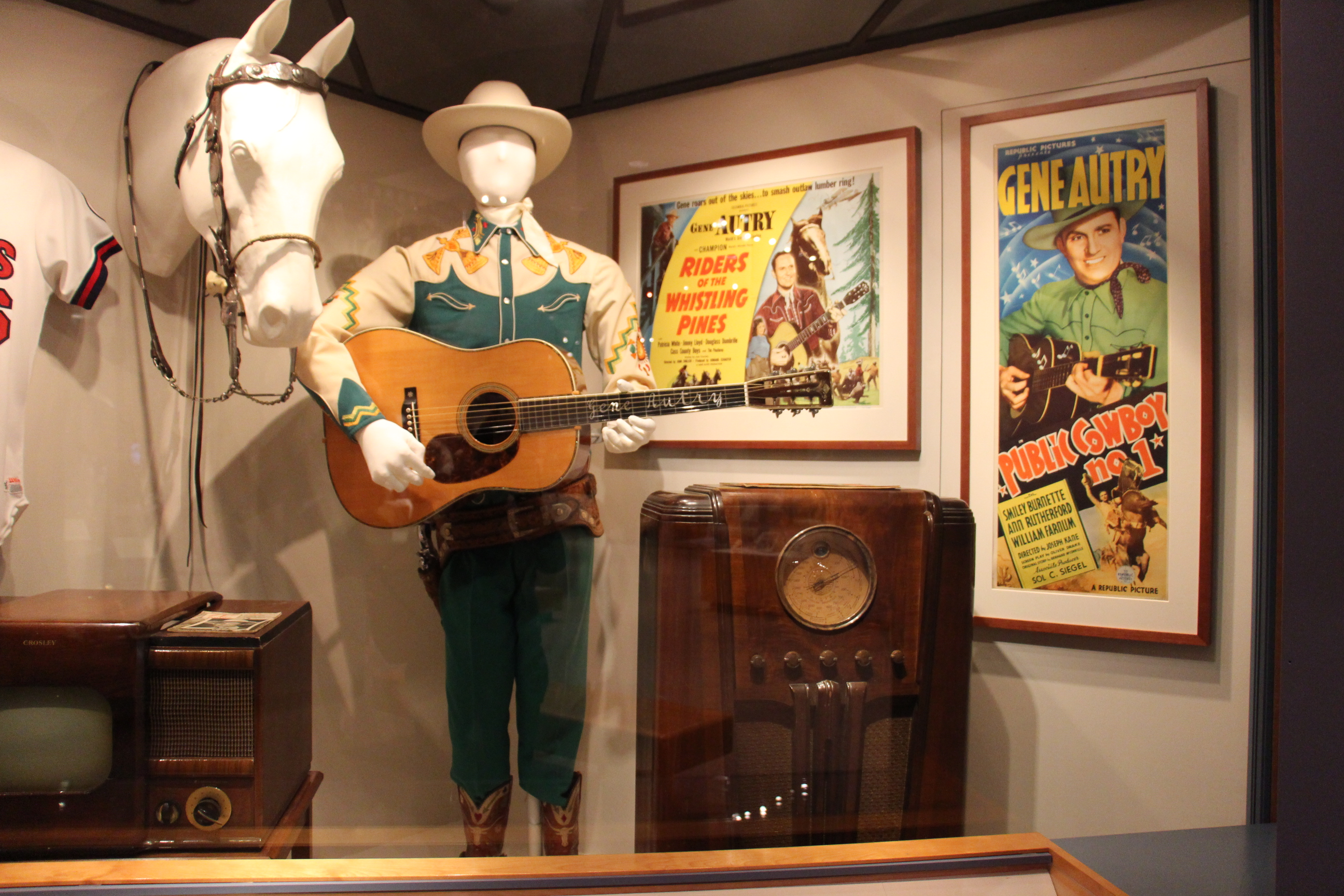
Display of Gene Autry memorabilia at the Autry National Center, including his original Martin D-45 guitar, the first one made

On November 16, 1941, the town of Berwyn, Oklahoma, north of Ardmore, was renamed Gene Autry in his honor. Though Autry was born in Tioga, Texas, his family moved to Oklahoma while he was an infant. He was raised in the southern Oklahoma towns of Achille and Ravia. Autry had also worked as a telegraph operator near Berwyn. In 1939, he bought the 1,200-acre (4.9 km^{2}) Flying A Ranch on the west edge of Berwyn, and the town decided to honor him by changing its name. Approximately 35,000 people attended the ceremonies broadcast live from the site on Autry's Melody Ranch radio show. Expectations that Autry would make his permanent home on the ranch were heightened when Autry's house in California burned down just 8 days before the name change ceremony, but dashed three weeks later with the attack on Pearl Harbor. Autry joined the military in 1942 and sold the ranch after the war.

In 1972, he was inducted into the Hall of Great Western Performers at the National Cowboy Hall of Fame and Western Heritage Center in Oklahoma City, Oklahoma. Autry was a life member of the Benevolent and Protective Order of Elks, Burbank Lodge No. 1497. His 1976 autobiography, co-written by Mickey Herskowitz, was titled Back in the Saddle Again after his 1939 hit and signature tune. He is also featured year after year, on radio and "shopping mall music" at the holiday season, by his recording of "Rudolph, the Red-Nosed Reindeer". "Rudolph" became the first No. 1 hit of the 1950s. In 2003, he was ranked No. 38 in CMT's list of the 40 Greatest Men of Country Music.

In 1977, Autry was awarded the American Patriots Medal by Freedoms Foundation of Valley Forge, Pennsylvania.

Johnny Cash recorded a song in 1978 about Autry called "Who is Gene Autry?" Cash also got Autry to sign his famous black Martin D-35 guitar, which he plays in the video of "Hurt".

In 1983, Autry received the Golden Plate Award of the American Academy of Achievement.

Autry was inducted into the Oklahoma Hall of Fame in 1991.

When the Anaheim Angels won their first World Series in 2002, much of the championship was dedicated to him. The interchange of Interstate 5 and State Route 134, near the Autry National Center in Los Angeles, is signed as the "Gene Autry Memorial Interchange". There is also a street named after Autry in Anaheim, California, called Gene Autry Way, and there is a street in Palm Springs, California named Gene Autry Trail.

Autry was inducted into the National Radio Hall of Fame in 2003. In 2004, Starz joined forces with the Autry estate to restore all of his films, which have been shown on Starz's Encore Westerns channel on premium television on a regular basis to date since.

In 2007, he became a charter member of the Gennett Records Walk of Fame in Richmond, Indiana.

In May 2019, Warner Chappell Music acquired the Gene Autry Music Group, a music publisher comprising four smaller publishers, 1,500 compositions (including "Back in the Saddle Again", "Here Comes Santa Claus", "Just Walkin' in the Rain", and "You Belong To Me"), and several of Autry's master recordings.

=== Statues ===
==== California ====
- (1988) Back in the Saddle Again by David Spellerberg (semi-public statue: Autry and his movie horse "Champion"); exterior courtyard, Autry Museum of the American West, Los Angeles, California
- (1998) Gene Autry Statue by De L'Esprie (semi-public statue: Autry with hat in hand); exterior courtyard inside gate 2, Angel Stadium/Edison International Field of Anaheim, Anaheim, California
- (2009) Gene Autry, America's Favorite Singing Cowboy by De L'Esprie (public statue: Autry seated, with guitar); Palm Springs, California

=== Hollywood Walk of Fame ===
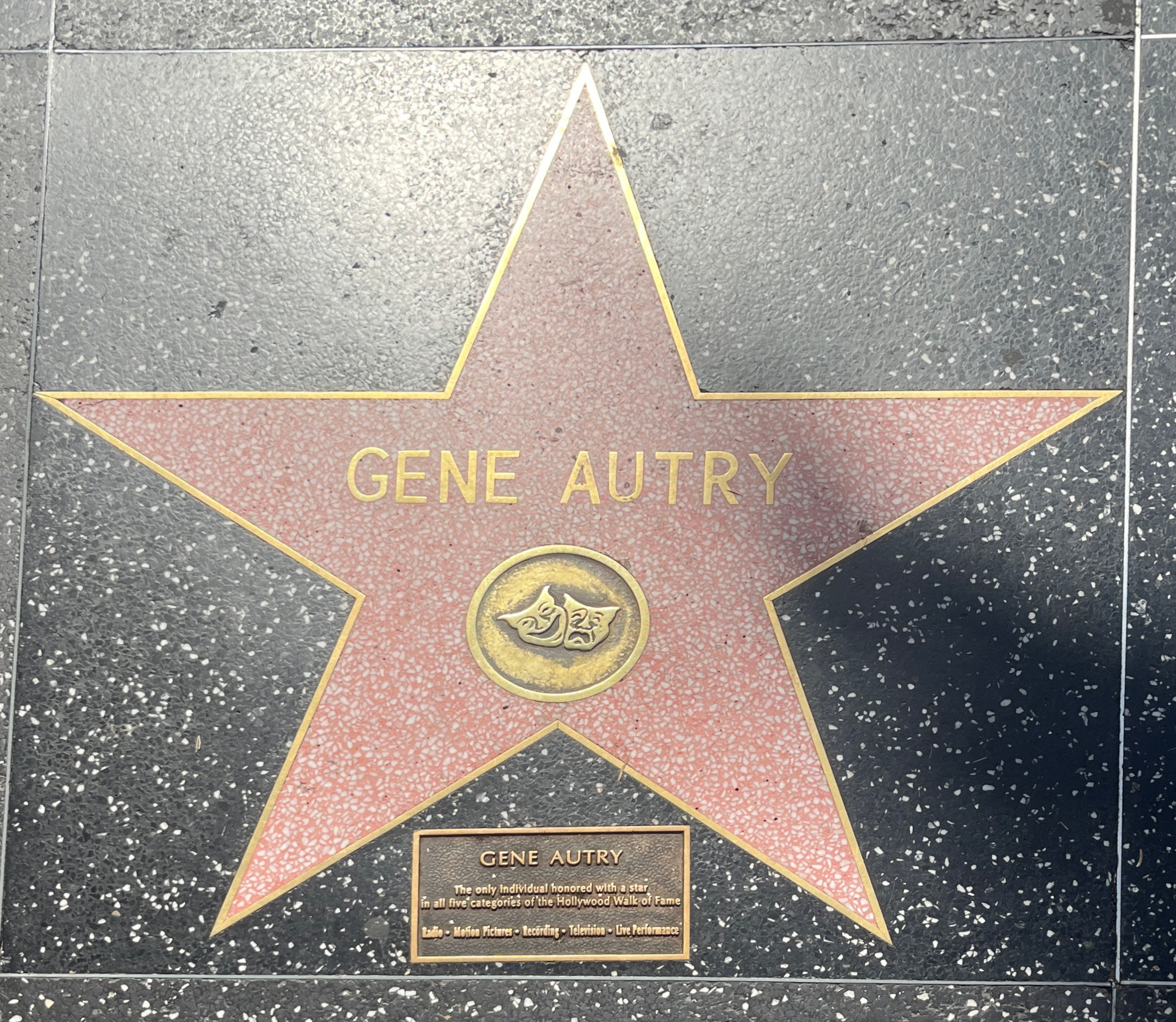
Autry's star for Live performance, noting that he has a star in five categories — Radio, Television, Motion Pictures, Recording Live Performance.

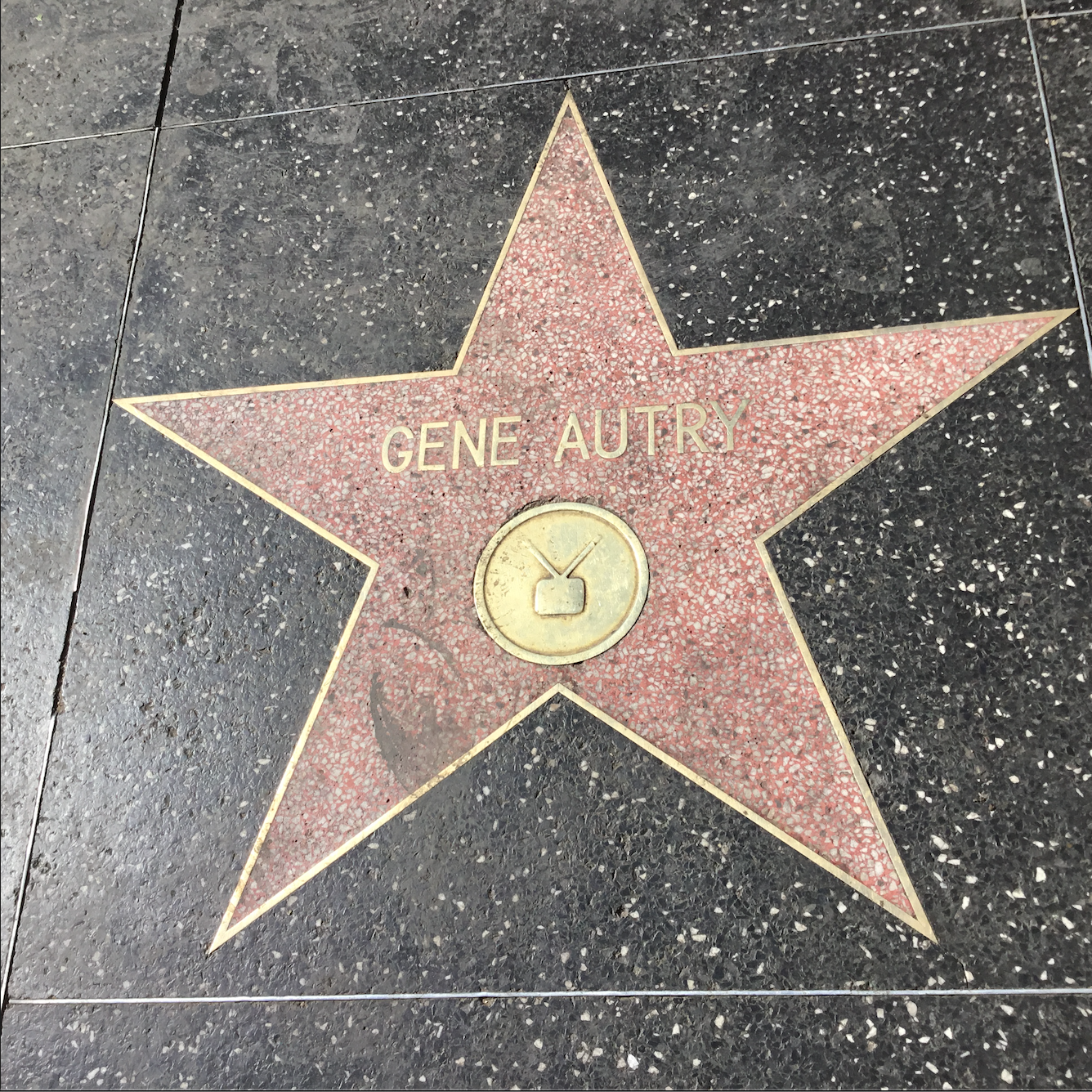
Autry's television star on the Hollywood Walk of Fame

Autry is the only person to have five stars on the Hollywood Walk of Fame, in each of five categories defined by the Hollywood Chamber of Commerce. All of Autry's stars are located along Hollywood Boulevard: Recording at 6384, Radio at 6520, Motion pictures at 6644, Television at 6667, and Live theatre at 7000 Hollywood Boulevard. His first four stars were placed during the initial inductions of 1960 while the final one was placed in 1987, in the additional category named "Live theatre"—later renamed "Live performance"—introduced in 1984.

=== Museum of the American West ===
The Autry Museum of the American West in Los Angeles' Griffith Park was founded in 1988 as the Gene Autry Western Heritage Museum featuring much of Autry's personal collection of Western art and memorabilia as well as collections of his friends and other Western film stars. Since 2004, the museum is partnered with the Southwest Museum of the American Indian and is divided into two locations, eight miles apart from each other.

== Discography ==
+ 1,000,000 units sold

=== Albums ===
Year	Album	US Country	Label
1976	South of the Border, All American Cowboy	42	Republic
1976	Cowboy Hall of Fame	44	Republic

=== Singles ===
==== 1930s ====
Year	Single	Peak chart positions	
Year	Single	US Country	US Popular
1932	"That Silver-Haired Daddy of Mine" + (G. Autry and Jimmy Long)	—	—
1933	"The Yellow Rose Of Texas" (G. Autry and Jimmy Long)	—	—
1933	"Cowboy's Heaven"	—	—
1933	"The Last Round-Up"	—	—
1935	"Tumbling Tumbleweeds" (Gene Autry Trio)	—	7
1935	"That Silver-Haired Daddy of Mine" + (G. Autry and Jimmy Long)	—	10
1935	"Ole Faithful" (Gene Autry Trio)	—	10
1936	"Mexicali Rose"	—	—
1936	"You're the Only Star in My Blue Heaven"	—	—
1937	"The One Rose (That's Left In My Heart)"	—	—
1937	"It's Round-Up Time In Reno"	—	—
1938	"Take Me Back to My Boots and Saddle"	—	—
1938	"Dust"	—	—
1938	"There's a Gold Mine in the Sky"	—	—
1939	"Paradise in the Moonlight"	1	—
1939	"South of the Border (Down Mexico Way)" +	1	15
1939	"Back in the Saddle Again" +	1	—
1939	"Little Sir Echo"	1	—
1939	"A Gold Mine In Your Heart"	13	—
1939	"Blue Montana Skies"	16	—

==== 1940s ====
Year	Single	Peak chart positions	
Year	Single	US Country	US Popular
1940	"I'm Beginning To Care"	1	—
1940	"The Merry-Go-Roundup"	2	—
1940	"Goodbye Little Darlin' Goodbye"	1	20
1940	"Mary Dear"	4	—
1940	"Were You Sincere"	1	—
1940	"Broomstick Buckaroo"	3	—
1940	"Blueberry Hill"	6	—
1940	"When I'm Gone You'll Soon Forget"	6	—
1940	"El Rancho Grande"	11	—
1940	"The Singing Hills"	11	—
1941	"You Are My Sunshine"+	1	23
1941	"Be Honest with Me"	1	23
1941	"You Waited Too Long"	2	—
1941	"It Makes No Difference Now"	6	—
1941	"Lonely River"	9	—
1942	"Tweedle-O-Twill"	1	—
1942	"Deep in the Heart of Texas"	1	—
1943	"It Makes No Difference Now"	3	—
1943	"I Hang My Head and Cry"	4	—
1943	"We've Come A Long Way Together"	10	—
1944	"I'm Thinking Tonight of My Blue Eyes"	3	—
1945	"At Mail Call Today"	1	—
1945	"I'll Be Back"	7	—
1945	"Gonna Build a Big Fence Around Texas"	2	—
1945	"Don't Fence Me In"	4	—
1945	"Don't Hang Around Me Anymore"	4	—
1945	"Don't Live a Lie"	4	—
1945	"I Want to Be Sure"	4	—
1946	"Silver Spurs (On the Golden Stairs)"	4	—
1946	"I Wish I Had Never Met Sunshine"	3	—
1946	"You Only Want Me When You're Lonely"	7	—
1946	"Wave to Me, My Lady"	4	—
1946	"Have I Told You Lately that I Love You?"	3	—
1946	"Someday (You'll Want Me to Want You)"	4	—
1947	"Home On The Range"/"Red River Valley"	—	—
1947	"You're Not My Darlin' Anymore"	3	—
1948	"Here Comes Santa Claus (Down Santa Claus Lane)"+'	5	8
1948	"Buttons and Bows"	6	17
1948	"Here Comes Santa Claus (Right Down Santa Claus Lane)"	4	8
1949	"Ghost Riders in the Sky"	—	—
1949	"Rudolph, the Red-Nosed Reindeer"+ (w/ The Pinafores)	1	1
1949	"Here Comes Santa Claus (Right Down Santa Claus Lane)"	8	24
"—" denotes releases that did not chart

==== 1950s ====
Year	Single	Peak chart positions	
Year	Single	US Country	US Popular
1950	"Peter Cottontail"+	3	5
1950	"Frosty the Snow Man"+ (w/ The Cass County Boys)	4	7
1950	"Rudolph, the Red-Nosed Reindeer" (w/ The Pinafores)	5	3
1951	"Old Soldiers Never Die"	9	—
1953	"Up on the Housetop"	—	—
1957	"Nobody's Darlin' but Mine"	—	—
1957	"Rudolph, the Red-Nosed Reindeer" (re-entry)	—	70
"—" denotes releases that did not chart

==== 1990s ====
Year	Single	Peak chart positions	
Year	Single	US Country	US AC
1998	"Rudolph, the Red-Nosed Reindeer" (re-entry)	55	—
1999	"Rudolph, the Red-Nosed Reindeer" (re-entry)	60	24
"—" denotes releases that did not chart

==== 2010s ====
Year	Single	Peak chart positions
Year	Single	US
2018	"Here Comes Santa Claus (Down Santa Claus Lane)" (re-entry)	28
2018	"Rudolph, the Red-Nosed Reindeer" (re-entry)	16
2019	"Here Comes Santa Claus (Down Santa Claus Lane)" (re-entry)	32
2019	"Rudolph, the Red-Nosed Reindeer" (re-entry)	22

==== 2020s ====
Year	Single	Peak chart positions
Year	Single	US
2020	"Here Comes Santa Claus (Down Santa Claus Lane)" (re-entry)	26
2020	"Rudolph, the Red-Nosed Reindeer" (re-entry)	16
2021	"Rudolph, the Red-Nosed Reindeer" (re-entry)	19
2022	"Here Comes Santa Claus (Down Santa Claus Lane)" (re-entry)	25
2022	"Rudolph, the Red-Nosed Reindeer" (re-entry)	28
2023	"Here Comes Santa Claus (Down Santa Claus Lane)" (re-entry)	21
2023	"Rudolph, the Red-Nosed Reindeer" (re-entry)	26
2024	"Here Comes Santa Claus (Down Santa Claus Lane)" (re-entry)	23
2024	"Rudolph, the Red-Nosed Reindeer" (re-entry)	30
2025	"Here Comes Santa Claus (Down Santa Claus Lane)" (re-entry)	22
2025	"Rudolph, the Red-Nosed Reindeer" (re-entry)	30

=== Holiday 100 chart entries ===
Since many radio stations in the US adopt a format change to Christmas music each December, many holiday hits have an annual spike in popularity during the last few weeks of the year and are retired once the season is over. In December 2011, Billboard began a Holiday Songs chart with 50 positions that monitors the last five weeks of each year to "rank the top holiday hits of all eras using the same methodology as the Hot 100, blending streaming, airplay, and sales data", and in 2013, the number of positions on the chart was doubled, resulting in the Holiday 100. A few Autry recordings have made appearances on the Holiday 100 and are noted below according to the holiday season in which they charted there.

Title	Holiday season peak chart positions														
Title	2011	2012	2013	2014	2015	2016	2017	2018	2019	2020	2021	2022	2023	2024	2025
"Frosty the Snowman"	—	—	—	—	100	90	—	—	—	—	—	—	100	100	85
"Here Comes Santa Claus (Down Santa Claus Lane)"	45	34	43	48	27	37	18	10	12	12	25	19	17	20	19
"Rudolph the Red-Nosed Reindeer"	14	14	11	11	8	10	10	7	10	14	13	17	14	26	25
"Up on the Housetop (Ho! Ho! Ho!)"	—	—	80	—	—	94	80	72	94	91	74	84	94	78	79

== Filmography ==
From 1934 to 1953, Autry appeared in 93 films. (Note: Autry's first three films were produced by Mascot Pictures. His next 57 films, from Tumbling Tumbleweeds (1935) through Robin Hood of Texas (1947), were produced by Republic Pictures. His final 33 films, from The Last Round-up (1947) through Last of the Pony Riders (1953), were produced by Columbia Pictures.) From 1950 to 1955, he also appeared in 91 episodes of The Gene Autry Show television series. As of 2014, a large number of these films and television episodes remain available via the Gene Autry Foundation on the Western Channel (a cable television station), the latter having collaborated with the Foundation to restore the Republic titles, which had been cut to a uniform 54 minutes for television release in the 1950s, to full length and to provide clean negative-based source prints for all the titles in the 1990s.

- In Old Santa Fe (1934)
- Mystery Mountain (1934) (serial)
- The Phantom Empire (1935) (serial)
- Tumbling Tumbleweeds (1935)
- Melody Trail (1935)
- The Sagebrush Troubadour (1935)
- The Singing Vagabond (1935)
- Red River Valley (1936)
- Comin' Round the Mountain (1936)
- The Singing Cowboy (1936)
- Guns and Guitars (1936)
- Ride Ranger Ride (1936)
- Oh, Susanna! (1936)
- The Big Show (1936)
- The Old Corral (1936)
- Round-Up Time in Texas (1937)
- Git Along Little Dogies (1937)
- Rootin' Tootin' Rhythm (1937)
- Yodelin' Kid from Pine Ridge (1937)
- Public Cowboy No. 1 (1937)
- Boots and Saddles (1937)
- Springtime in the Rockies (1937)
- The Old Barn Dance (1938)
- Gold Mine in the Sky (1938)
- Man from Music Mountain (1938)
- Prairie Moon (1938)
- Rhythm of the Saddle (1938)
- Western Jamboree (1938)
- Home on the Prairie (1939)
- Mexicali Rose (1939)
- Blue Montana Skies (1939)
- Mountain Rhythm (1939)
- Colorado Sunset (1939)
- In Old Monterey (1939)
- Rovin' Tumbleweeds (1939)
- South of the Border (1939)
- Rancho Grande (1940)
- Shooting High (1940)
- Gaucho Serenade (1940)
- Carolina Moon (1940)
- Ride, Tenderfoot, Ride (1940)
- Melody Ranch (1940)
- Ridin' on a Rainbow (1941)
- Back in the Saddle (1941)
- The Singing Hill (1941)
- Sunset in Wyoming (1941)
- Under Fiesta Stars (1941)
- Down Mexico Way (1941)
- Sierra Sue (1941)
- Cowboy Serenade (1942)
- Heart of the Rio Grande (1942)
- Home in Wyomin' (1942)
- Stardust on the Sage (1942)
- Call of the Canyon (1942)
- Bells of Capistrano (1942)
- Sioux City Sue (1946)
- Trail to San Antone (1947)
- Twilight on the Rio Grande (1947)
- Saddle Pals (1947)
- Robin Hood of Texas (1947)
- The Last Round-Up (1947)
- The Strawberry Roan (1948)
- Loaded Pistols (1948)
- The Big Sombrero (1949)
- Riders of the Whistling Pines (1949)
- Rim of the Canyon (1949)
- The Cowboy and the Indians (1949)
- Riders in the Sky (1949)
- Sons of New Mexico (1949)
- Mule Train (1950)
- Cow Town (1950)
- Hoedown (1950)
- Beyond the Purple Hills (1950)
- Indian Territory (1950)
- The Blazing Sun (1950)
- Gene Autry and the Mounties (1951)
- Texans Never Cry (1951)
- Whirlwind (1951)
- Silver Canyon (1951)
- The Hills of Utah (1951)
- Valley of Fire (1951)
- The Old West (1952)
- Night Stage to Galveston (1952)
- Apache Country (1952)
- Barbed Wire (1952)
- Wagon Team (1952)
- Blue Canadian Rockies (1952)
- Winning of the West (1953)
- On Top of Old Smoky (1953)
- Goldtown Ghost Riders (1953)
- Pack Train (1953)
- Saginaw Trail (1953)
- Last of the Pony Riders (1953)

== See also ==
- Autry National Center of the American West
- Gene Autry, Oklahoma
- Hollywood Christmas Parade
- List of best-selling music artists
- List of Freemasons
- List of members of the American Legion
- Melody Movie Ranch
