= Champion the Wonder Horse =

Horse; on-screen companion of Gene Autry in 79 films

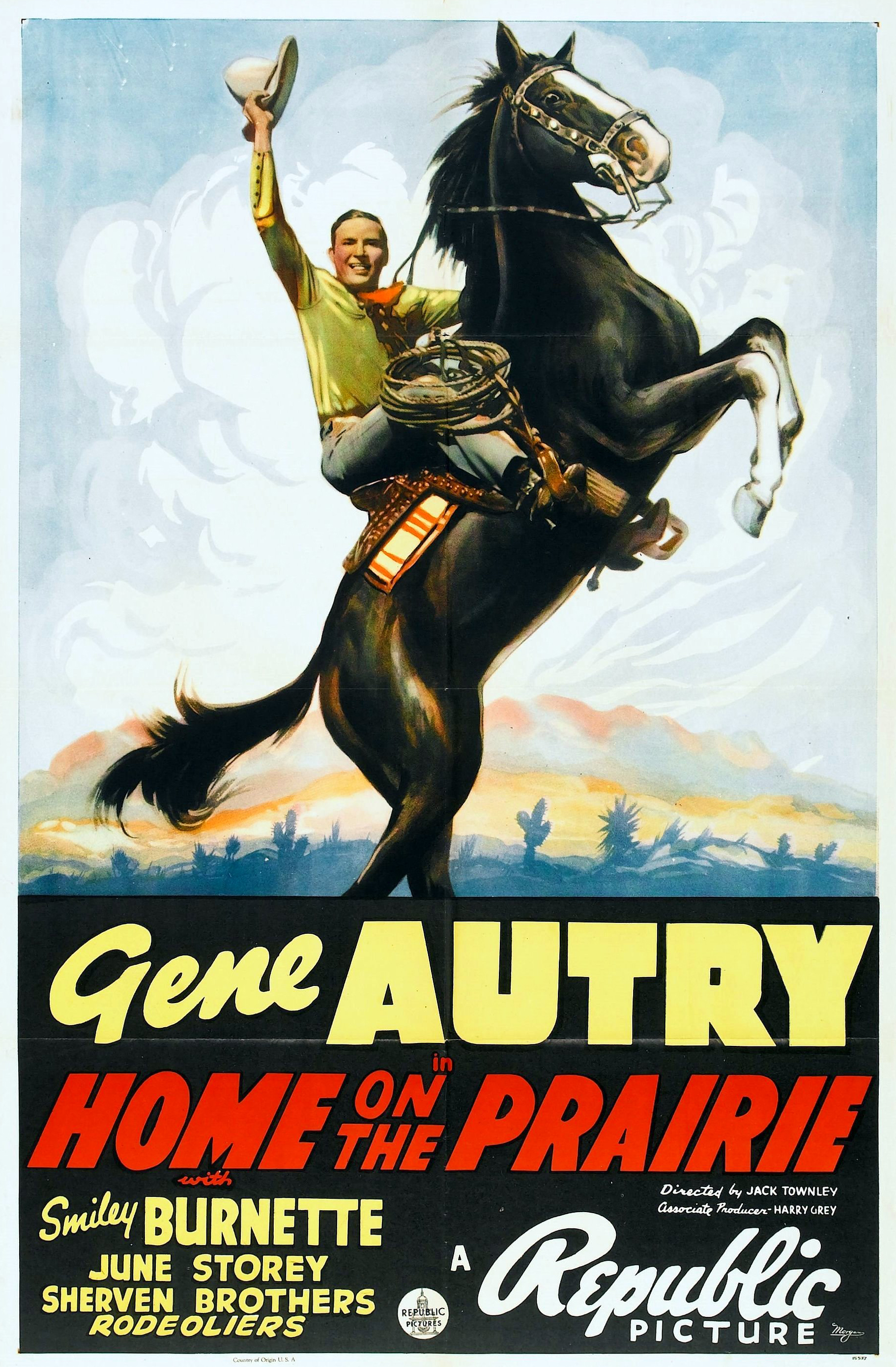
Original Champion shown on the Home on the Prairie poster, 1939.

Champion the Wonder Horse was the on-screen companion of singing cowboy Gene Autry in 79 films between 1935 and 1952, and 91 television episodes of The Gene Autry Show between 1950 and 1955. In addition, Champion starred in 26 episodes of his own television series The Adventures of Champion in 1955 and 1956. Throughout these years, Autry used three horses to portray "Champion": the original Champion who appeared in Autry films from 1935 to 1942, Champion Jr. who appeared in Autry films from 1946 to 1950, and Television Champion, who appeared in Autry's films from 1950 to 1953, and in the television series during the 1950s. Several other "Champion" horses were used as stunt doubles and for personal appearances throughout the years.

== Biography ==
There were three official Champions that appeared in Gene Autry films. The original Champion was a dark sorrel with a blaze face and white stockings on all his legs except the right front. The original Champion first appeared on screen with Autry in Melody Trail (1935) and went on to co-star in 51 additional Autry films. The horse was previously owned by Tom Mix and was used during the filming of The Phantom Empire series; he was one of several horses that Autry rode in that production. After learning about the horse through stunt man and movie horse wrangler Tracey Layne, Autry paid $75 for the original Champion, whose sire was a Morgan trotting horse from Ardmore, Oklahoma. Trained to perform numerous tricks, Champion could untie knots, fall, roll over and play dead, come at Autry's whistle, bow, and shake his head yes and no. In one film he pushes Autry into the arms of his leading lady June Storey. By 1939 his reported worth was $25,000. The original Champion died in 1943, at the age of 17, from apparent heart attack while Gene was in the army. He was buried at Melody Ranch by Autry's horse trainer John Agee, who had previously worked for 14 years for Tom Mix.

Autry's second screen horse was Champion Jr., a lighter sorrel with four stockings and a narrow blaze ending in an arrow tip. This horse appeared in Autry's films from 1946 to 1950. For his Republic Pictures film appearances he was credited as the "Wonder Horse of the West"; for his Columbia Pictures film appearances he was credited as the "World's Wonder Horse". He appeared with Autry at Madison Square Garden in 1946. Champion Jr. was over 30 years old when he died in August 1977. In the late 1940s, a well-trained trick pony named Little Champ, with a blaze-face and four stockings, joined Gene's stable and appeared in three Autry films and joined him in various personal appearances.

Autry's third screen horse was Television Champion, also a light sorrel with four white stockings, but with a wide blaze that covered his nose. Owned by Autry's wife Ina, he resembled Champion Jr., but had his mane and tail bleached. Television Champion appeared in Autry's later films from 1950 to 1953 and in all 91 television episodes of The Gene Autry Show and all 26 episodes of The Adventures of Champion during the 1950s.

Throughout the years, several other "Champions" served as doubles for film stunts and personal appearances, including Little Champ, Lindy Champion, and Touring Champion. In 1940, Lindy Champion became the first horse to fly from California to New York to appear with Autry at Madison Square Garden for the World's Championship Rodeo. Touring Champion, a darker sorrel with a medium blaze and four white stockings, became one of Autry's most reliable horses for public appearances. Autry paid $1,500 for the horse, which was part Morgan and part Tennessee Walking Horse. Touring Champion is seen in several scenes of Gaucho Serenade (1940), including the "Song at Sunset" scene with Mary Lee, and appeared with Autry in rodeos and stage shows throughout the late 1940s and early 1950s, including an appearance in England in 1953. His hoof prints appear next to Autry's handprints at Grauman's Chinese Theatre in Hollywood. It is not known when Touring Champion died. Champion Three, a sorrel with four white stockings and a crooked blaze, appeared with Autry at personal appearances in the late 1950s until 1960, when he retired to Melody Ranch in Newhall, California, where he died in 1990. In the "Deep in the Heart of Texas" scene from Heart of the Rio Grande (1942) we see an unidentified Champion that has three white stockings and a white blaze face similar to, but different than, that of Touring Champion.

All of the Champions were skilled in a wide range of complex horse tricks, including dancing the hula and the Charleston, jumping through rings of fire, and playing dead. They greeted crowds from Texas to Ireland and were featured in dime novels, children's stories, and comic books. Their popularity matched some of the most popular film stars of their day, even receiving equal billing with Autry above the leading ladies on film posters and lobby cards. The original Champion received thousands of fan letters each month.

== See also ==
- The Adventures of Champion (TV series)
- Wonder horses
- List of fictional horses
