= William Bradford (cinematographer) =

American cinematographer (1905–1959)

- Born: September 8, 1905; Barre, Vermont, United States
- Died: May 18, 1959 (aged 53); Los Angeles, California, United States
- Occupation: Cinematographer
- Years active: 1935–1959

William Bradford (September 8, 1905 – May 18, 1959) was an American cinematographer. He was nominated for an Oscar for Best Special Effects on the film Women in War at the 13th Academy Awards. He worked on more than 100 films during his career.

== Career ==
Bradford was a member of the American Society of Cinematographers; the February 1953 issue of American Cinematographer listed him among members then working as directors of photography, on the Gene Autry Productions film Saginaw Trail for Columbia Pictures.

Bradford photographed many of Gene Autry's Westerns for Columbia in the early 1950s, including Gene Autry and the Mounties and Whirlwind (both 1951), Barbed Wire and Wagon Team (both 1952), and Goldtown Ghost Riders and Last of the Pony Riders (both 1953). He also worked on television Westerns and other series, including The Gene Autry Show, The Roy Rogers Show, The Range Rider, Annie Oakley,Sky King, M Squad, Tales of Wells Fargo and Death Valley Days.

== Selected filmography ==
- Women in War (1940)
- The Fighting Seabees (1940)
- Secret Service in Darkest Africa (1943)
- The Man from Music Mountain (1943)
- The San Antonio Kid (1944)
- Call of the South Seas (1944)
- San Fernando Valley (1944)
- Secrets of Scotland Yard (1944)
- Utah (1945)
- Don't Fence Me In (1945)
- Scotland Yard Investigator (1945)
- The Man from Oklahoma (1945)
- Along the Navajo Trail (1945)
- My Pal Trigger (1946)
- The Last Round-up (1947)
- Carson City Raiders (1948)
- Loaded Pistols (1948)
- Adventures of Gallant Bess (1948)
- The Blazing Sun (1950)
- The Hills of Utah (1951)
- The Old West (1952)
- Paris Model (1953)
- Top Banana (1954)
- Return to Treasure Island (1954)
- The Three Outlaws (1956)
- Outer Space Jitters (1957)
