= James Sweeney (film editor) =

American film editor (1901–1957)

- Born: James R. Sweeney; February 27, 1901; Illinois, US
- Died: March 11, 1957 (aged 56); Los Angeles, California, US
- Occupation: Film editor

James R. Sweeney (February 27, 1901 – March 11, 1957) was an American film editor.

== Biography ==
Born on February 27, 1901, in Illinois, Sweeney started his Hollywood career in 1929. After starting as a film editor for Columbia, including a number of Three Stooges short subjects, he spent most of the rest of his career on Columbia features and programmers. He was active through 1957, and worked on about 100 films and some early television series.

Sweeney died on March 11, 1957, aged 56, of a heart attack.

== Filmography ==
- Shadow Ranch (1930)
- The Dawn Trail (1930)
- The Lone Rider (1930)
- The Lightning Flyer (1931)
- Umpa, (1933)
- Woman Haters, (1934; Three Stooges short)
- Three Little Pigskins, (1934; Three Stooges short)
- Horses' Collars, (1935; Three Stooges short)
- Hoi Polloi, (1935; Three Stooges short)
- Pop Goes the Easel, (1935; Three Stooges short)
- Pardon My Scotch, (1935; Three Stooges short)
- Killer at Large (1936)
- Trapped by Television (1936)
- Venus Makes Trouble (1937)
- Smashing the Spy Ring (1938)
- Parents on Trial (1939)
- Beware Spooks! (1939)
- So You Won't Talk, (1940)
- Atlantic Convoy (1942)
- Is Everybody Happy? (1943)
- The Return of Rusty (1946)
- Last of the Redmen (1947)
- Best Man Wins (1948)
- Rusty Leads the Way (1948)
- Mary Ryan, Detective (1949)
- Prison Warden (1949)
- The Blazing Sun (1950)
- Flame of Stamboul (1951)
- The Hills of Utah (1951)
- The Old West (1952)
- Winning of the West (1953)
- Gun Fury (1953)
- The Incredible Petrified World (1958)
