= List of Columbia Pictures films (1950–1959) =

The following is a list of feature films produced and distributed by the American studio Columbia Pictures from 1950 until 1959. While the company continued to make many of its films in-house, it increasingly also released films made by independent producers.

== 1950 ==
Release date	Title	Notes
January 1950	All the King's Men	Remade in 2006; Winner of the Academy Award for Best Picture Inducted into the National Film Registry in 2001
January 5, 1950	Mary Ryan, Detective	
January 11, 1950	The Nevadan	co-production with Scott-Brown Productions
January 12, 1950	Mark of the Gorilla	co-production with Sam Katzman Productions
February 2, 1950	Trail of the Rustlers	
February 9, 1950	Girls' School	
February 15, 1950	The Traveling Saleswoman	Co-production with Joan Davis Productions
February 22, 1950	Tyrant of the Sea	
February 22, 1950	Mule Train	distribution only; produced by Gene Autry Productions
February 22, 1950	Father Is a Bachelor	
March 9, 1950	Blondie's Hero (Note: Owned by Lionsgate)	distribution only
March 16, 1950	A Woman of Distinction	
March 18, 1950	The Palomino	Co-production with Robert Cohn Productions
April 1, 1950	Cargo to Capetown	
April 6, 1950	Cody of the Pony Express	Serial film
April 13, 1950	Outcast of Black Mesa	
April 13, 1950	Beware of Blondie	distribution only
April 26, 1950	Faust and the Devil	Co-production with Cineopra
April 27, 1950	Military Academy with That Tenth Avenue Gang	
April 27, 1950	Kill the Umpire	
April 27, 1950	Captive Girl	
April 28, 1950	No Sad Songs for Me	
May 3, 1950	The Doorman	Mexican film; co-production with Posa Films
May 4, 1950	Beauty on Parade	
May 18, 1950	Customs Agent	
May 19, 1950	Fortunes of Captain Blood	
May 19, 1950	Cow Town	distribution only; produced by Gene Autry Productions
June 1, 1950	The Good Humor Man	
June 1, 1950	Texas Dynamo	
June 1, 1950	Hoedown	
June 8, 1950	State Penitentiary	
June 21, 1950	Rogues of Sherwood Forest	
July 1, 1950	711 Ocean Drive	Co-production with Frank Seltzer Productions
July 13, 1950	David Harding, Counterspy	
July 20, 1950	Atom Man vs. Superman (Note: Owned by Warner Bros.)	distribution only; Serial film
July 25, 1950	Beyond the Purple Hills	distribution only; produced by Gene Autry Productions
August 3, 1950	Streets of Ghost Town	
August 3, 1950	On the Isle of Samoa	
August 17, 1950	The Petty Girl	
August 30, 1950	When You're Smiling	
August 1950	In a Lonely Place	co-production with Santana Pictures Corporation Inducted into the National Film Registry in 2007
August 1950	Convicted	
September 8, 1950	Rookie Fireman	
September 14, 1950	Across the Badlands	
September 15, 1950	The Fuller Brush Girl	
September 30, 1950	Indian Territory	distribution only; produced by Gene Autry Productions
October 1950	Between Midnight and Dawn	
October 1, 1950	Raiders of Tomahawk Creek	
October 25, 1950	Last of the Buccaneers	Co-production with SK Pictures
November 1, 1950	Chain Gang	
November 2, 1950	Harriet Craig	
November 2, 1950	Pirates of the High Seas	Serial film
November 15, 1950	The Texan Meets Calamity Jane	
November 15, 1950	Emergency Wedding	
November 16, 1950	The Tougher They Come	
November 20, 1950	The Blazing Sun	Co-production with Gene Autry Productions
November 21, 1950	Counterspy Meets Scotland Yard	
November 22, 1950	Pygmy Island	
December 1, 1950	The Killer That Stalked New York	Co-production with Robert Cohn Productions
December 1, 1950	Lightning Guns	
December 2, 1950	He's a Cockeyed Wonder	
December 12, 1950	Revenue Agent	
December 24, 1950	The Flying Missile	
December 25, 1950	Born Yesterday	Remade in 1993; Nominee for the Academy Award for Best Picture Inducted into the National Film Registry in 2012
December 29, 1950	Frontier Outpost	
December 1950	Stage to Tucson	

== 1951 ==
Release date	Title	Notes
January 2, 1951	Gasoline Alley	
January 15, 1951	Prairie Roundup	
January 17, 1951	Al Jennings of Oklahoma	
January 30, 1951	Gene Autry and the Mounties	distribution only; produced by Gene Autry Productions
February 14, 1951	A Yank in Korea	
February 23, 1951	Ridin' the Outlaw Trail	
February 26, 1951	Fury of the Congo	
March 5, 1951	Flame of Stamboul	
March 8, 1951	My True Story	
March 10, 1951	Valentino	Co-production with Edward Small Productions
March 15, 1951	Fort Savage Raiders	
March 15, 1951	Texans Never Cry	distribution only; produced by Gene Autry Productions
March 1951	M	distribution only; co-production with Superior Productions
April 1, 1951	Santa Fe	Co-production with Scott-Brown Productions
April 16, 1951	Whirlwind	distribution only; produced by Gene Autry Productions
April 18, 1951	The Brave Bulls	Co-production with Rossen Enterprises
May 2, 1951	The Seven Macho Men	Co-production with Posa Films
May 4, 1951	Her First Romance	
May 5, 1951	Smuggler's Gold	
May 30, 1951	Snake River Desperadoes	
May 30, 1951	When the Redskins Rode	Co-production with Esskay Pictures Corporation
May 31, 1951	Roar of the Iron Horse	Serial film
May 31, 1951	Lorna Doone	co-production with Edward Small Productions
June 3, 1951	The Texas Rangers	Remake of 1936 film; co-production with Edward Small Productions
June 12, 1951	China Corsair	
June 13, 1951	Sirocco	co-production with Santana Pictures Corporation
June 20, 1951	Silver Canyon	distribution only; produced by Gene Autry Productions
June 27, 1951	Mask of the Avenger	
July 1, 1951	The Big Gusher	
July 13, 1951	Never Trust a Gambler	
July 16, 1951	Hurricane Island	Co-production with Esskay Pictures Corporation
July 24, 1951	Pickup	Co-production with Forum Productions and Hugo Haas Productions
July 26, 1951	Bonanza Town	
July 1951	Two of a Kind	
August 2, 1951	The Whistle at Eaton Falls	distribution only; produced by Louis De Rochemont Associates and RD-DR Corporation
August 13, 1951	The Magic Face	Co-production with Mort Briskin-Robert Smith Productions
August 13, 1951	The Lady and the Bandit	
August 14, 1951	Cyclone Fury	
August 23, 1951	Criminal Lawyer	
August 23, 1951	Chain of Circumstance	
September 10, 1951	Saturday's Hero	
September 13, 1951	Mysterious Island	Serial film
September 17, 1951	Corky of Gasoline Alley	
September 21, 1951	The Mob	
September 30, 1951	The Hills of Utah	distribution only; produced by Gene Autry Productions
September 1951	Sunny Side of the Street	
October 1951	Five	co-production with Arch Oboler Productions
October 4, 1951	Jungle Manhunt	
October 18, 1951	The Magic Carpet	Co-production with The Katzman Corporation and Esskay Pictures Corporation
October 24, 1951	The Harlem Globetrotters	
October 24, 1951	The Family Secret	Co-production with Santana Pictures Corporation
October 26, 1951	Ten Tall Men	Co-production with Norma Productions and Halburt Productions
October 30, 1951	The Kid from Amarillo	
October 31, 1951	The Son of Dr. Jekyll	
November 5, 1951	The Barefoot Mailman	co-production with Robert Cohn Productions
November 12, 1951	Purple Heart Diary	
November 20, 1951	Valley of Fire	distribution only; produced by Gene Autry Productions
December 2, 1951	Man in the Saddle	Co-production with Scott-Brown Productions
December 15, 1951	Pecos River	
December 20, 1951	Death of a Salesman	Co-production with Stanley Kramer Productions
December 27, 1951	Captain Video	Serial film

== 1952 ==
Release date	Title	Notes
January 2, 1952	Indian Uprising	Co-production with Edward Small Productions
January 11, 1952	Boots Malone	
January 15, 1952	The Old West	distribution only; produced by Gene Autry Productions
January 16, 1952	Scandal Sheet	Co-production with Motion Picture Investors
January 21, 1952	Harem Girl	
January 30, 1952	If I Were a Congressman	Co-production with Posa Films
January 31, 1952	Smoky Canyon	
January 31, 1952	The First Time	Co-production with Norma Productions and Halburt Productions
February 28, 1952	The Hawk of Wild River	
February 28, 1952	Okinawa	
March 13, 1952	The Marrying Kind	
March 17, 1952	Jungle Jim in the Forbidden Land	Co-production with The Katzman Corporation
March 18, 1952	Night Stage to Galveston	distribution only; produced by Gene Autry Productions
March 20, 1952	My Six Convicts	Co-production with Stanley Kramer Productions
April 3, 1952	A Yank in Indo-China	Co-production with Esskay Pictures Corporation
April 10, 1952	King of the Congo	Serial film
April 20, 1952	Laramie Mountains	
April 29, 1952	Walk East on Beacon!	Co-production with RD-DR Productions
May 7, 1952	Thief of Damascus	
May 9, 1952	The Sniper	Co-production with Stanley Kramer Productions
May 15, 1952	Paula	
May 30, 1952	Apache Country	distribution only; produced by Gene Autry Productions
May 1952	Sound Off	
June 1, 1952	Brave Warrior	Co-production Esskay Pictures Corporation
June 1, 1952	Montana Territory	
June 15, 1952	The Rough, Tough West	
June 25, 1952	The Brigand	Co-production with Edward Small Productions
July 1, 1952	Cripple Creek	Co-production with Edward Small Productions
July 4, 1952	California Conquest	Co-production with Esskay Pictures Corporation
July 7, 1952	Red Snow	Co-production with All American Film Corporation
July 12, 1952	Junction City	
July 24, 1952	Blackhawk	Distribution only; Serial film
July 25, 1952	Barbed Wire	distribution only; produced by Gene Autry Productions
July 29, 1952	Affair in Trinidad	Co-production with The Beckworth Corporation
July 1952	Storm Over Tibet	Co-production with Summit Productions
August 19, 1952	The Kid from Broken Gun	
August 27, 1952	Captain Pirate	
August 27, 1952	Last Train from Bombay	
September 4, 1952	Assignment – Paris!	
September 10, 1952	The Atomic Fireman	Mexican film; co-production with Posa Films
September 30, 1952	Wagon Team	distribution only; produced by Gene Autry Productions
September 1952	Strange Fascination	Co-production with Hugo Haas Productions
September 1952	Rainbow 'Round My Shoulder	
October 8, 1952	The Golden Hawk	Co-production with Esskay Pictures Corporation
October 8, 1952	The Four Poster	co-production with Stanley Kramer Productions
October 30, 1952	The Happy Time	co-production with Stanley Kramer Productions
November 6, 1952	Son of Geronimo	Serial film
November 15, 1952	Hangman's Knot	Co-production with Producers-Actors Corporation
November 30, 1952	Blue Canadian Rockies	distribution only; produced by Gene Autry Productions
November 1952	Voodoo Tiger	
December 9, 1952	The Pathfinder	
December 10, 1952	Invasion U.S.A.	Co-production with American Pictures Company and Mutual Productions of the West
December 25, 1952	The Member of the Wedding	Co-production with Stanley Kramer Productions
December 1952	Eight Iron Men	Co-production with Stanley Kramer Productions

== 1953 ==
Release date	Title	Notes
January 1953	Winning of the West	distribution only; produced by Gene Autry Productions
February 1953	Target Hong Kong	
February 1, 1953	Last of the Comanches	
February 3, 1953	Savage Mutiny	
March 3, 1953	All Ashore	
March 7, 1953	Prince of Pirates	Co-production with Esskay Pictures Corporation
March 20, 1953	The Glass Wall	
March 24, 1953	Salome	Co-production with The Beckworth Corporation
March 25, 1953	On Top of Old Smoky	distribution only; produced by Gene Autry Productions
April 1, 1953	Jack McCall, Desperado	
April 6, 1953	One Girl's Confession	Co-production with Hugo Haas Productions
April 7, 1953	Problem Girls	
April 9, 1953	Man in the Dark	Columbia's first 3D film
May 1, 1953	Fort Ti	3D film
May 5, 1953	Ambush at Tomahawk Gap	
May 5, 1953	The Juggler	Co-production with Stanley Kramer Productions
May 8, 1953	Serpent of the Nile	
May 20, 1953	The 49th Man	
May 20, 1953	Siren of Bagdad	Co-production with Esskay Pictures Corporation
May 20, 1953	Goldtown Ghost Riders	distribution only; produced by Gene Autry Productions
June 4, 1953	The Lost Planet	Serial film
July 1, 1953	The 5,000 Fingers of Dr. T.	Co-production with Stanley Kramer Productions; only film created by children's author Dr. Seuss
July 4, 1953	The Last Posse	
July 5, 1953	Pack Train	distribution only produced by Gene Autry Productions
July 17, 1953	Let's Do It Again	
July 20, 1953	Flame of Calcutta	Co-production with Esskay Pictures Corporation
July 29, 1953	Valley of Head Hunters	
July 30, 1953	The Stranger Wore a Gun	3D film; co-production with Scott-Brown Productions
August 3, 1953	Cruisin' Down the River	
August 5, 1953	From Here to Eternity	Winner of the Academy Award for Best Picture Inducted into the National Film Registry in 2002
August 21, 1953	Sky Commando	
August 1953	Mission Over Korea	Co-production with Robert Cohn Productions
September 2, 1953	The Photographer	Mexican film; co-production with Posa Films
September 7, 1953	China Venture	
September 17, 1953	The Great Adventures of Captain Kidd	Serial film
September 20, 1953	Saginaw Trail	distribution only; produced by Gene Autry Productions
September 1953	Conquest of Cochise	
October 1, 1953	Combat Squad	Co-production with Jack Broder Productions Inc.
October 14, 1953	The Big Heat	Inducted into the National Film Registry in 2011
October 1953	Slaves of Babylon	
November 3, 1953	Prisoners of the Casbah	Co-production with The Katzman Corporation
November 3, 1953	Last of the Pony Riders	distribution only; produced by Gene Autry Productions
November 10, 1953	Paris Model	Co-production with American Pictures Company
November 11, 1953	Gun Fury	3D film
December 2, 1953	The Nebraskan	3D film
December 3, 1953	El Alamein	
December 15, 1953	Killer Ape	
December 23, 1953	Miss Sadie Thompson	3D film; co-production with The Beckworth Corporation
December 24, 1953	Bad for Each Other	
December 30, 1953	Paratrooper	Released on August 11 in the UK as The Red Beret; co-production with Warwick Films

== 1954 ==
Release date	Title	Notes
February 1954	Charge of the Lancers	
February 1954	The Wild One	co-production with Stanley Kramer Productions
February 24, 1954	Bait	Co-production with Hugo Haas Productions
March 1954	It Should Happen to You	
March 1, 1954	The Battle of Rogue River	
March 10, 1954	Drive a Crooked Road	
April 2, 1954	Jesse James vs. the Daltons	3D film
April 7, 1954	The Mad Magician	3D film
April 15, 1954	Gunfighters of the Northwest	Serial film
April 23, 1954	Drums of Tahiti	3D film
April 1954	The Iron Glove	
April 1954	The Price of Living	U.S.A. distributor; co-production with Internacional Cinematográfica
May 1, 1954	Massacre Canyon	
May 3, 1954	The Miami Story	Co-production with Clover Productions
May 10, 1954	Indiscretion of an American Wife (Note: Owned by Disney (via ABC))	theatrical distribution in the Western Hemisphere only; produced by Produzione Films Vittorio De Sica and Selznick International Pictures
June 6, 1954	The Saracen Blade	
June 24, 1954	The Caine Mutiny	Co-production with Stanley Kramer Productions
June 1954	Jungle Man-Eaters	
July 3, 1954	The Outlaw Stallion	
July 16, 1954	Hell Below Zero	Co-production with Warwick Films
July 28, 1954	On the Waterfront	Winner of the Academy Award for Best Picture; co-production with Horizon Pictures Inducted into the National Film Registry in 1989
August 1, 1954	The Law vs. Billy the Kid	
August 6, 1954	Human Desire	
August 6, 1954	Pushover	
September 1, 1954	A Tailored Gentleman	Mexican film; co-production with Posa Films
September 2, 1954	The Black Dakotas	
September 3, 1954	O Cangaceiro	Co-production with Vera Cruz Studios
September 4, 1954	A Bullet Is Waiting	co-production with Welsch Productions, Inc.
October 28, 1954	The Black Knight	Co-production with Warwick Films
November 1, 1954	Cannibal Attack	
November 1, 1954	The Detective	U.S. distribution only; produced by Facet Productions
November 4, 1954	Three Hours to Kill	
November 5, 1954	Fire Over Africa	U.S. distribution only
November 10, 1954	Phffft!	
November 11, 1954	Riding with Buffalo Bill	Serial film
November 1954	The Affairs of Messalina	U.S. distribution only; produced by CEI Incom, Produzione Gallone, Filmsonor and Suevia Films
December 1, 1954	Masterson of Kansas	
December 4, 1954	They Rode West	
December 1954	The Bamboo Prison	

== 1955 ==
Release date	Title	Notes
January 26, 1955	The Violent Men	Filmed in CinemaScope
February 1, 1955	Ten Wanted Men	Co-production with Ranown Pictures Corporation and Scott-Brown Productions
February 9, 1955	The Long Gray Line	Co-production with Rota Productions; Filmed in CinemaScope
February 10, 1955	Pirates of Tripoli	Co-production with The Katzman Corporation
February 24, 1955	Three for the Show	Filmed in CinemaScope
February 1955	Women's Prison	
March 19, 1955	Tight Spot	
March 27, 1955	Wyoming Renegades	
April 19, 1955	Cell 2455, Death Row	
April 30, 1955	New Orleans Uncensored	
April 1955	Jungle Moon Men	
May 1, 1955	Seminole Uprising	
May 12, 1955	5 Against the House	Co-production with Romson Productions
May 1955	The End of the Affair	Co-production with Coronado Productions
June 9, 1955	The Adventures of Captain Africa	Serial film
June 22, 1955	Bring Your Smile Along	
July 13, 1955	The Night Holds Terror	
July 1955	It Came from Beneath the Sea	Co-production with Clover Productions
July 1955	Creature with the Atom Brain	Co-production with Clover Productions
July 1955	Chicago Syndicate	Co-production with Clover Productions
August 24, 1955	Apache Ambush	
August 31, 1955	Drop the Curtain	Mexican film; co-production with Posa Films
August 31, 1955	The Man from Laramie	Co-production with William Goetz Productions; Filmed in CinemaScope
September 1, 1955	The Gun That Won the West	Co-production with Clover Productions
September 14, 1955	Footsteps in the Fog	Co-production with Frankovich Productions
September 16, 1955	Duel on the Mississippi	Co-production with Clover Productions
September 22, 1955	My Sister Eileen	Filmed in CinemaScope
September 1955	Special Delivery	Co-production with Trans-Rhein Film
October 1955	Count Three and Pray	Co-production with Copa Productions; Filmed in CinemaScope
October 1, 1955	Devil Goddess	
October 14, 1955	A Prize of Gold	Co-production with Warwick Films
November 7, 1955	Queen Bee	
November 23, 1955	Three Stripes in the Sun	
November 30, 1955	The Crooked Web	Co-production with Clover Productions
November 1955	Teen-Age Crime Wave	Co-production with Clover Productions
December 7, 1955	The Last Frontier	Filmed in CinemaScope
December 11, 1955	The Prisoner	Co-production with Facet Productions and London Independent Producers
December 15, 1955	A Lawless Street	Co-production with Producer-Actors Corporation and Scott-Brown Productions
December 1955	Hell's Horizon	Co-production with Gravis Productions

== 1956 ==
Release date	Title	Notes
January 6, 1956	Perils of the Wilderness	Serial film
January 1956	Inside Detroit	Co-production with Clover Productions
February 15, 1956	Fury at Gunsight Pass	
February 16, 1956	Picnic	Nominee for the Academy Award for Best Picture Filmed in CinemaScope
February 1956	The Houston Story	Co-production with Clover Productions
February 1956	Battle Stations	
February 1956	Joe MacBeth	Co-production with Frankovich Productions
March 1956	Hot Blood	Filmed in CinemaScope
March 2, 1956	Uranium Boom	Co-production with Clover Productions
March 21, 1956	Rock Around the Clock	Co-production with Clover Productions
March 27, 1956	The Cockleshell Heroes	Co-production with Warwick Films Filmed in CinemaScope
March 31, 1956	The Harder They Fall	
April 1, 1956	Blackjack Ketchum, Desperado	Co-production with Clover Productions
April 11, 1956	The Last Ten Days	Co-production with Cosmopol-Film
April 24, 1956	Jubal	Filmed in CinemaScope
April 1956	Over-Exposed	
June 20, 1956	Safari	Co-production with Warwick Films Filmed in CinemaScope
June 21, 1956	The Eddy Duchin Story	Filmed in CinemaScope
June 25, 1956	Secret of Treasure Mountain	
July 31, 1956	Storm Center	Co-production with Phoenix Productions
July 1956	The Werewolf	Co-production with Clover Productions
July 1956	Earth vs. the Flying Saucers	Co-production with Clover Productions
July 1956	Bermuda Affair	Co-production with Bermuda Studio Productions
August 1, 1956	Autumn Leaves	Co-production with William Goetz Productions
August 4, 1956	Blazing the Overland Trail	Serial film
August 12, 1956	He Laughed Last	
August 22, 1956	The Solid Gold Cadillac	Nominee of the Golden Globe Award for Best Motion Picture – Musical or Comedy
August 27, 1956	Papa, Mama, the Maid and I	U.S. distribution only; produced by Concinor, Champs-Élysées Productions, Concinex and Lambor Films
September 7, 1956	Port Afrique	Co-production with Coronado Productions
September 24, 1956	The Silent World	U.S. distribution only; produced by Rank Organisation, FSJYC Production, Requins Associés, Société Filmad and Titanus
September 1956	1984	Co-production with Holiday Film Productions Ltd.
September 1956	Miami Exposé	Co-production with Clover Productions
October 2, 1956	Cha-Cha-Cha Boom!	Co-production with Four-Leaf Productions
October 31, 1956	You Can't Run Away from It	Filmed in CinemaScope
October 1956	Spin a Dark Web	Co-production with Frankovich Productions
November 1, 1956	The White Squaw	
November 19, 1956	Seven Samurai (Note: Retained by Toho, with U.S. distribution rights currently licensed to Janus Films and The Criterion Collection)	U.S. theatrical distribution only; produced by Toho
November 1956	Suicide Mission	U.S. distribution only; produced by Nordsjøfilm and North Sea
November 1956	Odongo	Co-production with Warwick Films; Filmed in CinemaScope
November 1956	Reprisal!	Co-production with Romson Productions
December 5, 1956	Nightfall	Co-production with Copa Productions
December 14, 1956	Don't Knock the Rock	Co-production with Clover Productions
December 25, 1956	Full of Life	
December 1956	Ride the High Iron	Co-production with Meridian Productions
December 1956	7th Cavalry	Co-production with Producers-Actors Corporation and Scott-Brown Productions
December 1956	Rumble on the Docks	Co-production with Clover Productions
December 1956	The Gamma People	Co-production with Warwick Films
December 1956	The Last Man to Hang?	Co-production with Association of Cinema Technicians

== 1957 ==
Release date	Title	Notes
January 1957	Zarak	co-production with Warwick Films; Filmed in CinemaScope
February 1957	Wicked as They Come	Co-production with Frankovich Productions
February 1, 1957	Utah Blaine	co-production with Clover Productions
March 6, 1957	The Shadow on the Window	
March 25, 1957	The Tall T	Co-production with Producers-Actors Corporation and Scott-Brown Productions Inducted into the National Film Registry in 2000
March 1957	Zombies of Mora Tau	Co-production with Clover Productions
March 1957	The Man Who Turned to Stone	Co-production with Clover Productions
April 1, 1957	The Phantom Stagecoach	
April 12, 1957	The Strange One	Co-production with Horizon Pictures
April 17, 1957	Abandon Ship!	Co-production with Copa Productions
April 25, 1957	The Garment Jungle	
April 1957	The Guns of Fort Petticoat	co-production with Brown-Murphy Productions
May 1, 1957	Sierra Stranger	Co-production with Acireman Productions
May 21, 1957	Torero	Co-production with Producciones Barbachano Ponce and Producciones Olmeca
May 1957	Hellcats of the Navy	Co-production with Morningside Productions
June 1, 1957	Beyond Mombasa	co-production with Hemisphere Pictures and Todon Productions
June 1957	Calypso Heat Wave	co-production with Clover Productions
June 1957	The Night the World Exploded	co-production with Clover Productions
June 1957	The Giant Claw	co-production with Clover Productions
June 1957	The Burglar	co-production with Samson Productions
June 1957	20 Million Miles to Earth	co-production with Morningside Productions
July 26, 1957	The Young Don't Cry	
July 1957	The 27th Day	
August 2, 1957	Jeanne Eagels	
August 7, 1957	3:10 to Yuma	Remade in 2007 Inducted into the National Film Registry in 2012
August 8, 1957	Fire Down Below	co-production with Warwick Films; Filmed in CinemaScope
August 13, 1957	Pickup Alley	co-production with Warwick Films; Filmed in CinemaScope
August 17, 1957	Operation Mad Ball	
August 1957	No Time to Be Young	
August 1957	Town on Trial	
September 1957	The Parson and the Outlaw	co-production with Charles 'Buddy' Rogers Productions
September 1957	Escape from San Quentin	Co-production with Clover Productions
September 1957	The Brothers Rico	Co-production with William Goetz Productions
October 9, 1957	Raquel's Shoeshiner	Co-production with Posa Films
October 25, 1957	Pal Joey	Co-production with Essex Productions and George Sidney Productions; Nominee of the Golden Globe Award for Best Motion Picture – Musical or Comedy
October 25, 1957	How to Murder a Rich Uncle	Co-production with Warwick Films; Filmed in CinemaScope
October 31, 1957	Decision at Sundown	Co-production with Producer-Actors Corporation and Scott-Brown Productions
October 1957	Domino Kid	Co-production with Rorvic Productions and Calhoun-Orsatti Enterprises
October 1957	The Tijuana Story	Co-production with Clover Productions
November 6, 1957	The Story of Esther Costello	Co-production with Romulus Films
December 14, 1957	The Bridge on the River Kwai	Co-production with Horizon Pictures; Winner of the Academy Award for Best Pictures; Winner of the Golden Globe Award for Best Motion Picture - Drama; Filmed in CinemaScope Inducted into the National Film Registry in 1997
December 16, 1957	The Admirable Crichton	Co-production with Modern Screenplay Productions
December 1957	The Hard Man	Co-production with Romson Productions
December 1957	The Long Haul	Co-production with Marksman Films

== 1958 ==
Release date	Title	Notes
January 1958	The World Was His Jury	Co-production with Clover Productions
January 1958	Return to Warbow	
January 7, 1958	Cowboy	co-production with Phoenix Pictures
February 1958	Going Steady	co-production with Clover Productions
February 1958	Bonjour Tristesse	co-production with Wheel Productions; Filmed in CinemaScope
March 3, 1958	The True Story of Lynn Stuart	
March 30, 1958	Night of the Demon	US distribution of a UK film; co-production with Sabre Film Production
March 1958	Bitter Victory	Co-production with Transcontinental Films and Robert Laffont Productions; Filmed in CinemaScope
April 1958	High Flight	Co-production with Warwick Films; Filmed in CinemaScope
June 1, 1958	The Revenge of Frankenstein	U.S. distributor; produced by Hammer Film Productions
June 11, 1958	The Camp on Blood Island	U.S. distributor; produced by Hammer Film Productions
June 11, 1958	The Lineup	Co-production with Pajemer Productions
June 22, 1958	Gideon of Scotland Yeard	
June 24, 1958	The Goddess	Co-production with Carnegie Productions
June 25, 1958	This Angry Age	co-production with Dino de Laurentiis Cinematografica
June 25, 1958	Screaming Mimi	co-production with Sage Productions
June 1958	The Case Against Brooklyn	Co-production with Morningside Productions
June 1958	Let's Rock	
July 1, 1958	The Key	Co-production with Highroad and Open Road Films; Filmed in CinemaScope
July 8, 1958	She Played with Fire	Co-production with John Harvel Productions
July 1958	Crash Landing	Co-production with Clover Productions
July 1958	Gunman's Walk	Filmed in CinemaScope
July 1958	Life Begins at 17	Co-production with Clover Productions
August 1958	Tank Force	U.S. distributor; produced by Warwick Films
August 6, 1958	Buchanan Rides Alone	Co-production with Producer-Actors Corporation and Scott-Brown Productions
September 1, 1958	Apache Territory	Co-production with Rorvic Productions
September 17, 1958	The Snorkel	U.S. distributor; produced by Hammer Film Productions
September 1958	Ghost of the China Sea	Co-production with Charles B. Griffith Productions & Polynesian Film Productions
September 1958	The Whole Truth	
October 23, 1958	Housewife to Your Neighbor	Mexican film; co-production with Asociación Mexicana de la Cruz Roja and Posa Films
October 1958	Me and the Colonel	
October 1958	Kill Her Gently	
November 2, 1958	Tarawa Beachhead	
November 1958	The Last Hurrah	
December 23, 1958	The 7th Voyage of Sinbad	Inducted into the National Film Registry in 2008
December 25, 1958	Bell, Book and Candle	Co-production with Phoenix Productions; Nominee of the Golden Globe Award for Best Motion Picture – Comedy
December 1958	The Man Inside	Co-production with Warwick Films; Filmed in CinemaScope
December 1958	Senior Prom	
December 1958	Murder by Contract	Co-production with Orbit Productions

== 1959 ==
Release date	Title	Notes
January 1, 1959	Good Day for a Hanging	co-production with Morningside Productions
January 30, 1959	The Last Blitzkrieg	Co-production with Clover Productions
February 10, 1959	Forbidden Island	Co-production with Charles B. Griffith Productions
February 15, 1959	Ride Lonesome	Co-production with Ranown Pictures; Filmed in CinemaScope
February 1959	City of Fear	Co-production with Orbit Productions
March 2, 1959	The Two-Headed Spy	Co-production with Sabre Film Production
March 25, 1959	Verboten! (Note: Owned by Warner Bros. (via Turner Entertainment Co.))	Distribution only, produced by RKO Radio Pictures, Rank Organisation and Globe Enterprises
March 1959	Gunmen from Laredo	
April 1959	The Bandit of Zhobe	co-production with Warwick Films; Filmed in CinemaScope
April 1, 1959	Juke Box Rhythm	Co-production with Clover Productions
April 10, 1959	Gidget	Filmed in CinemaScope
May 1959	Face of a Fugitive	co-production with Morningside Productions
May 1, 1959	The Young Land	Distribution only; co-production with C.V. Whitney Pictures
May 2, 1959	Up and Down	Mexican film; co-production with Posa Films
May 28, 1959	The H-Man	US and select international distribution only; produced by Toho
June 17, 1959	Middle of the Night	Co-production with Sudan Productions
June 24, 1959	Porgy and Bess	Distribution only; produced by Samuel Goldwyn Productions; Winner of the Golden Globe Award for Best Motion Picture – Musical or Comedy Inducted into the National Film Registry in 2011
July 1959	The Legend of Tom Dooley	Co-production with Sheptner Productions
July 1, 1959	Anatomy of a Murder	Nominee for the Academy Award for Best Picture; Nominee of the Golden Globe Award for Best Motion Picture – Drama; Distribution only; produced by Carlyle Productions Inducted into the National Film Registry in 2012
July 29, 1959	The Tingler	Co-production with William Castle Productions
August 1, 1959	Have Rocket, Will Travel	
August 5, 1959	It Happened to Jane	Co-production with Arwin Productions
August 5, 1959	Hey Boy! Hey Girl!	
August 6, 1959	The 30 Foot Bride of Candy Rock	Co-production with D.R.B. Production Company
October 1, 1959	They Came to Cordura	Co-production with Goetz Pictures and Baroda Productions Filmed in CinemaScope
October 21, 1959	The Crimson Kimono	co-production with Globe Enterprises
October 22, 1959	The Last Angry Man	Co-production with Fred Kohlmar Productions
November 2, 1959	Edge of Eternity	Co-production with Thunderbird Productions; Filmed in CinemaScope
November 1959	The Mouse That Roared	co-production with Highroad Productions
November 1959	Battle of the Coral Sea	Co-production with Morningside Productions
November 1959	The Warrior and the Slave Girl	US distribution only; produced by Filmar, Alexandra Produzioni Cinematografiche and Atenea Films
December 1, 1959	1001 Arabian Nights	Co-production with UPA; Columbia's first animated film
December 20, 1959	Suddenly, Last Summer	Co-production with Horizon Pictures, Academy Pictures Corporation, Camp Films
December 1959	The Gene Krupa Story	
December 1959	The Flying Fontaines	Co-production with Clover Productions

== See also ==
- List of Columbia Pictures films

== Bibliography ==
- Blottner, Gene (2011). Columbia Pictures Movie Series, 1926-1955: The Harry Cohn Years. McFarland. ISBN 9780786433537.
- Dick, Bernard F. (2014). Columbia Pictures: Portrait of a Studio. University Press of Kentucky. ISBN 9780813117690.
