= Singin' Spurs =

1948 film by Ray Nazarro

- Theatrical release poster
- Directed by: Ray Nazarro
- Screenplay by: Barry Shipman
- Produced by: Colbert Clark
- Starring: Kirby Grant; Patricia Barry; Lee Patrick; Jay Silverheels; Dick Elliott; William Wilkerson
- Cinematography: Rex Wimpy
- Edited by: Paul Borofsky
- Production company: Columbia Pictures
- Distributed by: Columbia Pictures
- Release date: September 23, 1948
- Running time: 62 minutes
- Country: United States
- Language: English

Singin' Spurs is a 1948 American Western musical film directed by Ray Nazarro and written by Barry Shipman. The film stars Kirby Grant, Patricia Barry, Lee Patrick, Jay Silverheels, Dick Elliott and William Wilkerson. The film was released on September 23, 1948, by Columbia Pictures.

== Cast ==
- Kirby Grant as Jeff Carter
- Patricia Barry as Joan Dennis
- Lee Patrick as Clarissa Bloomsbury
- Jay Silverheels as Abel
- Dick Elliott as Mr. Miggs
- William Wilkerson as Chief Wolfpack
- Fred F. Sears as Mr. Hanson
- Chester Clute as Mr. Totter
- Paul Trietsch as Hezzie
- Ken Trietsch as Ken
- Gil Taylor as Gil
- Charles Ward as Gabe
- Marion Colby as Singer
- Red Egner as Singer
- Billy Hill as Singer
