= The Arkansas Swing =

1948 film by Ray Nazarro

- Theatrical release poster
- Directed by: Ray Nazarro
- Screenplay by: Barry Shipman
- Produced by: Colbert Clark
- Starring: The Hoosier Hot Shots; Gloria Henry; Stuart Hart; June Vincent; Elinor Donahue; Dorothy Porter; Cottonseed Clark
- Cinematography: Rex Wimpy
- Edited by: Paul Borofsky
- Production company: Columbia Pictures
- Distributed by: Columbia Pictures
- Release date: July 29, 1948
- Running time: 62 minutes
- Country: United States
- Language: English

The Arkansas Swing is a 1948 American comedy Western film directed by Ray Nazarro and written by Barry Shipman. The film stars Gloria Henry, Stuart Hart, June Vincent, Elinor Donahue, Dorothy Porter and Douglas Fowley. The film was released on July 29, 1948, by Columbia Pictures.

== Cast ==
- Gloria Henry as Margie MacGregor
- Stuart Hart as Bill Nolan
- June Vincent as Pamela Trent
- Elinor Donahue as Toni MacGregor
- Dorothy Porter as Dorothy Porter
- Douglas Fowley as Howard
- Syd Saylor as Sheriff Dibble
- Eddy Waller as Boggs
- Pierre Watkin as Horse Vet
- Dick Elliott as Realtor
- Ken Trietsch as Hotshot Ken
- Paul Trietsch as Hotshot Hezzie
- Gil Taylor as Hotshot Gil
- Charles Ward as Hotshot Gabe
- Cottonseed Clark as Cottonseed Clark
