= Rose of Santa Rosa =

1947 film by Ray Nazarro

- Theatrical release poster
- Directed by: Ray Nazarro
- Screenplay by: Barry Shipman
- Produced by: Colbert Clark
- Starring: Patricia Barry; Eduardo Noriega; Fortunio Bonanova; Eduardo Ciannelli; Ann Codee; Rosita Marstini; Douglas Fowley
- Cinematography: George F. Kelley
- Edited by: Paul Borofsky
- Production company: Columbia Pictures
- Distributed by: Columbia Pictures
- Release date: December 25, 1947
- Running time: 65 minutes
- Country: United States
- Language: English

Rose of Santa Rosa is a 1947 American comedy film directed by Ray Nazarro and written by Barry Shipman. The film stars Patricia Barry, Eduardo Noriega, Fortunio Bonanova, Eduardo Ciannelli, Ann Codee, Rosita Marstini and Douglas Fowley. The film was released on December 25, 1947, by Columbia Pictures.

== Cast ==
- Patricia Barry as Dolores de Garfias
- Eduardo Noriega as Ramón Ortega
- Fortunio Bonanova as Don Manuel Ortega
- Eduardo Ciannelli as Don José de Garfias
- Ann Codee as Aunt Isabel
- Rosita Marstini as Mamacita
- Douglas Fowley as Larry Fish
- Hoosier Hot Shots as Themselves
- Aaron González as Orchestra Leader
