= West of Sonora =

1948 film by Ray Nazarro

- Theatrical release poster
- Directed by: Ray Nazarro
- Screenplay by: Barry Shipman
- Produced by: Colbert Clark
- Starring: Charles Starrett; Steve Darrell; George Chesebro; Anita Castle; Smiley Burnette
- Cinematography: Ira H. Morgan
- Edited by: Jerome Thoms
- Production company: Columbia Pictures
- Distributed by: Columbia Pictures
- Release date: March 25, 1948
- Running time: 55 minutes
- Country: United States
- Language: English

West of Sonora is a 1948 American Western film directed by Ray Nazarro and written by Barry Shipman. The film stars Charles Starrett, Steve Darrell, George Chesebro, Anita Castle and Smiley Burnette. The film was released on March 25, 1948, by Columbia Pictures. This was the thirtieth of 65 films in the Durango Kid series.

== Cast ==
- Charles Starrett as Steve Rollins / The Durango Kid
- Steve Darrell as Black Murphy
- George Chesebro as Sheriff Jeff Clinton
- Anita Castle as Penelope Clinton
- Smiley Burnette as Smiley Burnette
