= Raiders of Tomahawk Creek =

1950 film by Fred F. Sears

- Theatrical release poster
- Directed by: Fred F. Sears
- Screenplay by: Barry Shipman
- Story by: Robert Schaefer; Eric Freiwald
- Produced by: Colbert Clark
- Starring: Charles Starrett; Smiley Burnette; Edgar Dearing; Kay Buckley; Billy Kimbley; Paul Marion
- Cinematography: Fayte M. Browne
- Edited by: Paul Borofsky
- Production company: Columbia Pictures
- Distributed by: Columbia Pictures
- Release date: October 1, 1950
- Running time: 55 minutes
- Country: United States
- Language: English

Raiders of Tomahawk Creek is a 1950 American Western film directed by Fred F. Sears, written by Barry Shipman and starring Charles Starrett, Smiley Burnette, Edgar Dearing and Kay Buckley. The film was released on October 1, 1950 by Columbia Pictures. It is the 50th of 65 films in the Durango Kid series.

== Cast ==
- Charles Starrett as Steve Blake / The Durango Kid
- Smiley Burnette as Smiley
- Edgar Dearing as Randolph Dike
- Kay Buckley as Janet Clayton
- Billy Kimbley as Billy Calhoun
- Paul Marion as Chief Flying Arrow
- Paul McGuire as Sheriff
- Bill Hale as Jeff Calhoun
- Lee Morgan as Saunders
