= The Kid from Broken Gun =

1952 film by Fred F. Sears

- Theatrical release poster
- Directed by: Fred F. Sears
- Screenplay by: Barry Shipman; Ed Earl Repp
- Produced by: Colbert Clark
- Starring: Charles Starrett; Jock Mahoney; Angela Stevens; Tristram Coffin; Myron Healey
- Cinematography: Fayte M. Browne
- Edited by: Paul Borofsky
- Production company: Columbia Pictures
- Distributed by: Columbia Pictures
- Release date: August 16, 1952
- Running time: 55 minutes
- Country: United States
- Language: English

The Kid from Broken Gun is a 1952 American Western action film directed by Fred F. Sears and starring Charles Starrett, Jock Mahoney, Angela Stevens, Tristram Coffin and Myron Healey. The film is the 65th and final in the Durango Kid series.

== Plot ==
After having threatened Matt Fallon, Jack Mahoney is on trial for Fallon's murder and the theft of a strongbox. His friends Steve Reynolds and Smiley Burnette await the verdict. Mahoney's attorney Gail Kingston lodges a poor defense and Mahoney is jailed. Doc Handy arrives with proof of ownership of the stolen box, but he is killed before he can testify. Steve Reynolds (secretly the Durango Kid) tells of the discovery of hidden Santa Ana gold believed to be in the stolen strongbox. The Durango Kid gathers all interested parties in the courtroom and reveals the actual progression of events, thus exposing the real murderer.

== Cast ==
- Charles Starrett as Steve Reynolds / The Durango Kid
- Jock Mahoney as Jack Mahoney
- Angela Stevens as Gail Kingston
- Tristram Coffin as Martin Donohugh
- Myron Healey as Kiefer
- Helen Mowery as Dixie King (archive footage from The Fighting Frontiersman)
- Smiley Burnette as Smiley Burnette
- Chris Alcaide as Matt Fallon (uncredited)
- Edgar Dearing as Judge Halloway (uncredited)
- Mauritz Hugo as Sheriff (uncredited)
- Emmett Lynn as Cimarron Dobbs (uncredited, archive footage from The Fighting Frontiersman and West of Sonora)
- Ernie Adams as the Printer (uncredited, archive footage from The Fighting Frontiersman)
- John Cason as Chuck (uncredited)
- Donald Chaffin as Courtroom deputy (uncredited)
- Bill Clark as Courtroom deputy (uncredited)
- Robert Filmer as Munro (uncredited, archive footage from The Fighting Frontiersman)
- Zon Murray as Henchman Slade (uncredited, archive footage from The Fighting Frontiersman)
- George Chesebro as Henchman Rankin (uncredited, archive footage from The Fighting Frontiersman)
- Charles Horvath as Henchman Al (uncredited)
- Jim Diehl as Henchman (uncredited, archive footage from The Fighting Frontiersman)
- Eddie Parker as Henchman (uncredited)
- Bob Woodward as Henchman (uncredited)
- Ted Mapes as Henchman (uncredited, archive footage from The Fighting Frontiersman)
- Guy Edward Hearn as Jury foreman (uncredited)
- Frank O'Connor as Juror (uncredited)
- Steve Benton as Juror (uncredited)
- Pat O'Malley as Doc Handy (uncredited)
- Snub Pollard as Courtroom spectator (uncredited)
- Buddy Roosevelt as Courtroom spectator (uncredited)
- Cactus Mack as Courtroom spectator (uncredited)
- Fred F. Sears as Narrator (voice only) (uncredited)
- Bullet as Steve's horse (uncredited)
- Raider as Durango's horse (uncredited)

== Production ==
Since 1949, Columbia Pictures had been economizing on its series of Charles Starrett Western films. Every new production alternated with a lower-budget production that incorporated entire sequences from older Durango Kid features. In The Kid from Broken Gun, the new scenes comprise only about half of the 55-minute running time. Scriptwriter Barry Shipman structured the film as a courtroom story so that the scenes of witness testimony could be related as flashbacks to footage from The Fighting Frontiersman (1946) and West of Sonora (1948).

Starrett retired after filming was completed, ending the longest string of starring films in motion-picture history. Starrett appeared in 131 feature films between 1935 and 1952, exclusively for Columbia.
