= Throw a Saddle on a Star =

1946 film by Ray Nazarro

- Theatrical release poster
- Directed by: Ray Nazarro
- Screenplay by: J. Benton Cheney
- Produced by: Colbert Clark
- Starring: Ken Curtis; Jeff Donnell; Adele Roberts; Guinn "Big Boy" Williams; Andy Clyde; Frank Sully
- Cinematography: George Meehan
- Edited by: Art Seid
- Production company: Columbia Pictures
- Distributed by: Columbia Pictures
- Release date: March 14, 1946
- Running time: 60 minutes
- Country: United States
- Language: English

Throw a Saddle on a Star is a 1946 American Western film directed by Ray Nazarro and written by J. Benton Cheney. The film stars Ken Curtis, Jeff Donnell, Adele Roberts, Guinn "Big Boy" Williams, Andy Clyde and Frank Sully. The film was released on March 14, 1946, by Columbia Pictures.

== Cast ==
- Ken Curtis as Curt Walker
- Jeff Donnell as Judy Lane
- Adele Roberts as Barbara Allen
- Guinn "Big Boy" Williams as Big Boy Thompson
- Andy Clyde as Pop Walker
- Frank Sully as Henry Latimore
- The Dinning Sisters as Themselves
- Foy Willing as Foy Willing
- Paul Trietsch as Hezzie Allen
- Gil Taylor as Gil Allen
- Ken Trietsch as Ken Allen
- Charles Ward as Gabe Allen
