= The Desert Horseman =

1946 film by Ray Nazarro

- Theatrical release poster
- Directed by: Ray Nazarro
- Screenplay by: Sherman L. Lowe
- Story by: Sherman L. Lowe
- Produced by: Colbert Clark
- Starring: Charles Starrett; Adele Roberts; Walt Shrum; Smiley Burnette
- Cinematography: L. William O'Connell
- Edited by: Paul Borofsky
- Production company: Columbia Pictures
- Distributed by: Columbia Pictures
- Release date: July 11, 1946
- Running time: 57 minutes
- Country: United States
- Language: English

The Desert Horseman is a 1946 American Western film directed by Ray Nazarro and written by Sherman L. Lowe. The film stars Charles Starrett, Adele Roberts, Walt Shrum and Smiley Burnette. The film was released on July 11, 1946, by Columbia Pictures. This was the fourteenth of 65 films in the Durango Kid series.

== Cast ==
- Charles Starrett as Steve Godfrey / The Durango Kid
- Adele Roberts as Mary Ann Jarvis
- Walt Shrum as Bass Player
- Smiley Burnette as Smiley Burnette
- Richard Bailey as Sam Treadway
- John Merton as Rex Young
- George Morgan as Pete
- Tommy Coats as Baldy
- Jack Kirk as Sheriff
- Bud Osborne as Walt
- Riley Hill as Eddie
