= Lightning Guns =

1950 film by Fred F. Sears

- Directed by: Fred F. Sears
- Written by: Victor Arthur; Bill Milligan
- Produced by: Colbert Clark
- Starring: Charles Starrett; Smiley Burnette; Gloria Henry; William Bailey; Ken Houchins
- Cinematography: Fayte M. Browne
- Edited by: Paul Borofsky
- Music by: Mischa Bakaleinikoff
- Production company: Columbia Pictures
- Distributed by: Columbia Pictures
- Release date: December 1, 1951
- Running time: 55 minutes
- Country: United States
- Language: English

Lightning Guns is a 1950 American Western film directed by Fred F. Sears and starring Charles Starrett, Gloria Henry and William Bailey, the 51st of 65 films in the Durango Kid series. It was shot at the Iverson Ranch with art direction by Charles Clague.

== Cast ==
- Charles Starrett as Steve Brandon / Durango Kid
- Gloria Henry as Susan Atkins
- William Bailey as Luke Atkins
- Edgar Dearing as Capt. Dan Saunders
- Raymond Bond as Jud Norton
- Jock Mahoney as Sheriff Rob Saunders
- Ken Houchins as Ken Houchins - Guitar Player
- Smiley Burnette as Smiley Burnette

== Bibliography ==
- Pitts, Michael R. Western Movies: A Guide to 5,105 Feature Films. McFarland, 2012.
