= Bonanza Town =

1951 film by Fred F. Sears

- Directed by: Fred F. Sears
- Written by: Barry Shipman; Bert Horswell
- Produced by: Colbert Clark
- Starring: Charles Starrett; Myron Healey; Luther Crockett
- Cinematography: Henry Freulich
- Edited by: Paul Borofsky
- Music by: Mischa Bakaleinikoff
- Production company: Columbia Pictures
- Distributed by: Columbia Pictures
- Release date: July 26, 1951
- Running time: 56 minutes
- Country: United States
- Language: English

Bonanza Town is a 1951 American Western film directed by Fred F. Sears and starring Sears, Charles Starrett, Myron Healey and Luther Crockett. It is the 56th of 65 films in the Durango Kid series.

The film was shot at the Iverson Ranch. Its art direction was led by Charles Clague.

== Plot ==
In pursuit of the allegedly deceased Henry Hardison, Steve Ramsay uses marked bills to trace his whereabouts. His investigation leads him to Bonanza Town, where he secures employment under the town's influential figure Crag Bozeman. Upon receiving payment in marked bills, Steve's suspicions that Bozeman's superior is Hardison are confirmed. Hardison and his associates devise a scheme to eliminate both Steve and the Durango Kid.

== Cast ==
- Charles Starrett as Steve Ramsay / The Durango Kid
- Fred F. Sears as Henry Hardison
- Luther Crockett as Judge Anthony Dillon
- Myron Healey as Krag Boseman
- Charles Horvath as Henchman Smoker
- Slim Duncan as Slim Duncan
- Smiley Burnette as Smiley Burnette

== Bibliography ==
- Pitts, Michael R. Western Movies: A Guide to 5,105 Feature Films. McFarland, 2012.
