= Fayte M. Browne =

American cinematographer (1896–1952)

- Born: Fayte McKinley Browne; June 14, 1896; Salem, Oregon, USA
- Died: July 18, 1952 (aged 56); Los Angeles, California, USA
- Occupation: Cinematographer

Fayte M. Browne (1896–1952) was an American cinematographer who worked in Hollywood—primarily at Columbia Pictures—from the 1930s through the 1950s.

== Biography ==
Fayte was born in Salem, Oregon, to C.F. William Browne and Sarah Belle Snyder. He married Anna Marie Bernegg in Stockton, California, and the pair had three children.

He began working as a camera operator at Columbia in the early 1930s, but it wasn't until the late 1940s that he began getting regular work as a cinematographer. He shot almost 40 films between 1949 and 1952, the year he died in Los Angeles, California.

Aside from his career, Browne enjoyed racing miniature cars.

== Selected filmography ==
- The Kid from Broken Gun (1952)
- The Rough, Tough West (1952)
- Laramie Mountains (1952)
- Jungle Jim in the Forbidden Land (1952)
- The Hawk of Wild River (1952)
- Smoky Canyon (1952)
- Captain Video: Master of the Stratosphere (1951)
- Pecos River (1951)
- The Kid from Amarillo (1951)
- Mysterious Island (1951)
- Roar of the Iron Horse (1951)
- Snake River Desperadoes (1951)
- Ridin' the Outlaw Trail (1951)
- Prairie Roundup (1951)
- Lightning Guns (1950)
- Frontier Outpost (1950)
- Raiders of Tomahawk Creek (1950)
- Across the Badlands (1950)
- Streets of Ghost Town (1950)
- Hoedown (1950)
- Texas Dynamo (1950)
- Outcasts of Black Mesa (1950)
- Trail of the Rustlers (1950)
- Renegades of the Sage (1949)
- Horsemen of the Sierras (1949)
- Feudin' Rhythm (1949)
- Bandits of El Dorado (1949)
- South of Death Valley (1949)
- Cyclone Prairie Rangers (1949)
- Arizona (1940)
