= Mischa Bakaleinikov =

Russian-American composer and conductor (1890–1960)

Mischa Bakaleinikoff

Background information
- Born: Mikhail Romanovich Bakaleinikov; November 10, 1890; Moscow, Russian Empire
- Died: August 10, 1960 (aged 69) Los Angeles, California, U.S.
- Occupations: Composer, conductor, musical director
- Label: Columbia Studios

Mikhail Romanovich "Mischa" Bakaleinikov (also spelled Bakaleynikov and Bakaleinikoff; Russian: Михаил Романович Бакалейников; November 10, 1890, Moscow – August 10, 1960, Los Angeles) was a musical director, film composer and conductor.

== Personal life ==
Brother to Constantin, Nikolay and Vladimir, Bakaleinikov was born in Moscow in 1890. He left the Soviet Union for the United States, travelling via Shanghai, China, to Los Angeles, in 1926, and joined Columbia Studios's music department in Hollywood in 1931.

== Death ==
Bakaleinikoff was a member of a Masonic Lodge. At his funeral service in 1960, the music was played by a string ensemble from Columbia. He died at age 69, and was survived by his wife, Yvonne (née Wilson) and their four children. He was previously married to actress Helen Gilbert.

He is buried at Forest Lawn Memorial Park (Glendale).

== Career ==
Bakaleinikoff played the double bass in Columbia Studios' orchestra for films such as Lost Horizon before becoming the studio's music director in the early 1940s.

== Selected filmography ==
He scored the music to the following films:

- Ladies of Leisure (1930)
- Forbidden Trail (1932)
- Jane Eyre (1934)
- Behind the Green Lights (1935)
- Blondie (1938)
- The Pinto Kid (1941)
- Underground Agent (1942)
- Sergeant Mike (1944)
- Prison Ship (1945)
- The Girl of the Limberlost (1945)
- Terror Trail (1946)
- Galloping Thunder (1946)
- The Son of Rusty (1947)
- Sport of Kings (1947)
- The Last Round-up (1947)
- The Woman from Tangier (1948)
- The Strawberry Roan (1948)
- My Dog Rusty (1948)
- Rusty Leads the Way (1948)
- Thunderhoof (1948)
- Kazan (1949)
- The Blazing Sun (1950)
- The Kid from Amarillo (1951)
- Pecos River (1951)
- The Old West (1952)
- Laramie Mountains (1952)
- Flame of Calcutta (1953)
- The 49th Man (1953)
- Gun Fury (1953)
- Cell 2455, Death Row (1955)
- It Came from Beneath the Sea (1955)
- Seminole Uprising (1955)
- Battle Stations (1956)
- Earth vs. the Flying Saucers (1956)
- Reprisal! (1956)
- Hellcats of the Navy (1957)
- The Giant Claw (1957)
- 20 Million Miles to Earth (1957)
- The 27th Day (1957)
- Screaming Mimi (1958)
- Have Rocket, Will Travel (1959)
- Comanche Station (1960)
