= Tris Coffin =

Film and television actor (1909–1990)

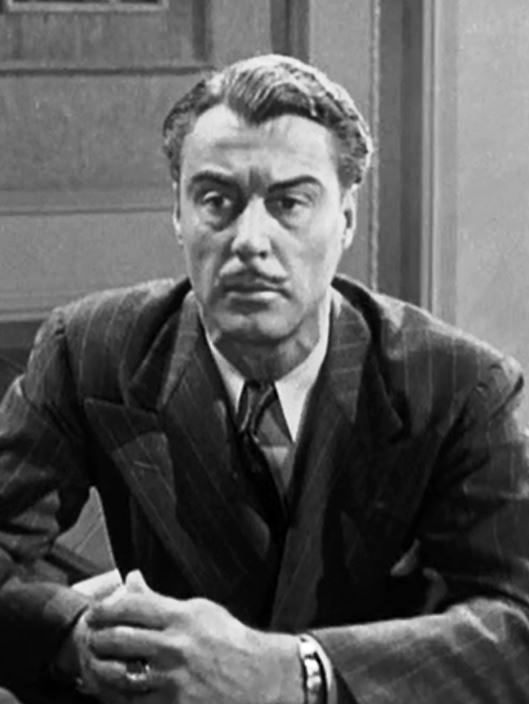
- Coffin in Dangerous Money (1946)
- Born: Tristram Chockley Coffin; August 13, 1909; Mammoth, Utah, US
- Died: March 26, 1990 (aged 80); Santa Monica, California, US
- Occupations: Film and television actor
- Years active: 1939–1977
- Spouse: Vera Duke (m. 1948)

Tristram Chalkley Coffin (August 13, 1909 – March 26, 1990) was an American film and television actor from the latter 1930s through the 1970s, usually in Westerns or other B-movie action-adventure productions.

== Early life ==
Coffin's mother was the actress Elizabeth Christie, and the writer Robert P. T. Coffin was his cousin.

== Career ==
In 1940, Coffin appeared as Phillips in Chasing Trouble, a comedy espionage film. He is perhaps best known for his role as Jeff King in Republic Pictures' King of the Rocket Men (1949), the first of three serials starring the "Rocket Man" character. During the 1940s and into the early 1950s, Coffin appeared in other movie serials, including Dick Tracy's G-Men (1939), Jesse James Rides Again (1947), Bruce Gentry - Daredevil of the Skies (1949), Pirates of the High Seas (1950), Mysterious Doctor Satan (1940), Sky Raiders (1941), Holt of the Secret Service (1941), Perils of Nyoka (1942), Federal Agents vs. Underworld, Inc (1949), and Radar Patrol vs. Spy King (1950).

In 1955, he joined Peter Graves, William Schallert, and Tyler McVey in the episode "The Man Who Tore Down the Wall" of NBC's Hallmark Hall of Fame. He had guest-starred in the series Adventures of Superman, sometimes playing a "good guy", sometimes a "bad guy". In 1954 he appeared as Principal Garwood in Stamp Day for Superman, which was produced by Superman, Inc. for The United States Department of the Treasury to promote the purchase of U.S. Savings Bonds.

Coffin also had a role in the very first TV episode of The Lone Ranger, as Captain Dan Reid of the Texas Rangers, the older brother of the man who would become The Lone Ranger after his brother and four other comrades were murdered by outlaws; he also appeared in the "Cannonball McKay" (1949) episode (1/16) as Marshall Jim Hanley. He also appeared as a guest star in the ABC Western series The Life and Legend of Wyatt Earp, starring Hugh O'Brian in the title role.

Coffin played the role of Col. Willis Murdock on the ABC/Warner Brothers Western series Colt .45 in the 1960 episode "The Cause". On February 9, 1960, Coffin appeared as Grey Gordon in "The 10 percent Blues" of the ABC/WB crime drama Bourbon Street Beat with Andrew Duggan, Richard Long, and Van Williams. He also guest-starred on the ABC/WB Western series The Alaskans.

In an episode of Climax!, an adaptation of Raymond Chandler's The Long Goodbye, Coffin, playing a dead body, is said to have arisen during its live broadcast and walked off stage. The event was widely covered in the media of the day, later becoming an urban legend that was attributed to Peter Lorre in the Climax! series adaptation of Casino Royale. Coffin also appeared in another episode of Climax!, "Escape from Fear", in 1955.

He also appeared in comedies, including episodes of The Beverly Hillbillies, Father Knows Best, Hey, Jeannie!, I Love Lucy, Batman, and Walter Brennan's The Real McCoys, and in the second season of The Abbott and Costello Show.

== Personal life and death ==
Coffin married model Vera Duke (née Veta Hetman) on January 6, 1948, in California.

Coffin died of lung cancer on March 26, 1990, in Santa Monica, California, at the age of 80. His ashes were scattered at sea.

Coffin was a Mormon.

== Partial filmography ==
- Overland Mail (1939)
- West of Pinto Basin (1940)
- Hidden Enemy (1940)
- Forbidden Trails (1941)
- No Greater Sin (1941)
- Roaring Frontiers (1941)
- Let's Go Collegiate (1941)
- Tonto Basin Outlaws (1941)
- The Corpse Vanishes (1942)
- The Devil's Trail (1942)
- Police Bullets (1942)
- The Crime Smasher (1943)
- Under Nevada Skies (1946)
- Swing the Western Way (1946)
- The Mysterious Mr. Valentine (1946)
- Rio Grande Raiders (1946)
- Louisiana (1947)
- Valley of Fear (1947)
- Where the North Begins (1947)
- California Firebrand (1948)
- King of the Rocket Men (1949)
- Radar Secret Service (1950)
- Square Dance Katy (1950)
- Undercover Girl (1950)
- The Lady Pays Off (1951)
- According to Mrs. Hoyle (1951)
- Northwest Territory (1951)
- Adventures of Superman (1951)
- Smoky Canyon (1952)
- The Kid from Broken Gun (1952)
- Fireman Save My Child (1954)
- Creature with the Atom Brain (1955)
- The Night the World Exploded (1957)
- The Crawling Hand (1963)
- Iron Angel (1964)
- Good Neighbor Sam (1964)
- Zebra in the Kitchen (1965)
- The Barefoot Executive (1971)
- Night Call Nurses (1972)
