= The Blazing Trail (1949 film) =

1949 film by Ray Nazarro

- Poster for the film
- Directed by: Ray Nazarro
- Written by: Barry Shipman
- Produced by: Colbert Clark
- Starring: Charles Starrett
- Cinematography: Ira Morgan
- Edited by: Paul Borofsky
- Production company: Columbia Pictures
- Distributed by: Columbia Pictures
- Release date: July 5, 1949 (US)
- Running time: 59 minutes
- Country: United States
- Language: English

The Blazing Trail, known in the United Kingdom as The Forged Will, is a 1949 American Western film directed by Ray Nazarro and starring Charles Starrett. This was the thirty-eighth of 65 films in the Durango Kid series.

== Cast ==
- Charles Starrett as The Durango Kid (aka Steve Allan)
- Marjorie Stapp as Janet Masters
- Fred F. Sears as Luke Masters
- Steve Darrell as Sam Brady
- Jock Mahoney as Full House Patterson
- Trevor Bardette as Jess Williams
- Hank Penny as Musician
- Slim Duncan as Musician
- Smiley Burnette as Smiley Burnette
- Steve Pendleton as Kirk Brady
- Robert Malcolm as Old Mike Brady
- John Cason as Colton
- Frank McCarroll as Citizen
- John Merton as Citizen

== Production ==
This picture was one of 65 "Durango Kid" films Starrett made for Columbia. The first two were made in 1940, while the remainder were made between 1945 and 1952 (when Starrett retired). Production on the film began in late January 1949, and was finished in early February. There were several songs in the film, performed by Burnette, Duncan, and Penny. They were: "You Put Me on My Feet" and "Extra, Extra!," both with music and lyrics by Smiley Burnette; "Cheer Up," music and lyrics by Slim Duncan and Hank Penny; and "Want a Gal From Texas," music and lyrics by George LaVerne and Floyd Bartlett. The picture was rated A-1, suitable for all audiences, by the National Legion of Decency.

== Reception ==
Motion Picture Daily gave the film a positive review, although they did find a flaws in the production, direction and writing. They extolled Starrett's performance, stating he "plays the Durango Kid in a roaringly-paced Western which, despite a few shortcomings, shapes up as good, exciting entertainment for action-film fans. Their issue came back with certain flashback scene, and the use of Starrett inserting narrative dialogue into the action. They highlighted the music insertions by Penny, Duncan and Burnette.
