= Ridin' the Outlaw Trail =

1951 film by Fred F. Sears

- Directed by: Fred F. Sears
- Written by: Victor Arthur
- Produced by: Colbert Clark
- Starring: Charles Starrett; Sunny Vickers; Edgar Dearing
- Cinematography: Fayte M. Browne
- Edited by: Paul Borofsky
- Music by: Mischa Bakaleinikoff
- Production company: Columbia Pictures
- Distributed by: Columbia Pictures
- Release date: February 23, 1951
- Running time: 56 minutes
- Country: United States
- Language: English

Ridin' the Outlaw Trail is a 1951 American Western film directed by Fred F. Sears and starring Charles Starrett, Sunny Vickers and Edgar Dearing. The film's sets were designed by the art director Charles Clague. Shot at the Iverson Ranch, the film is the 53rd of 65 in the Durango Kid series.

== Cast ==
- Charles Starrett as Steve Forsythe / The Durango Kid
- Sunny Vickers as Betsy Willard
- Edgar Dearing as Pop Willard
- Jim Bannon as Ace Donley
- Peter M. Thompson as Sheriff Tom Chapman
- Pee Wee King as Pee Wee King - Golden West Cowboys Band Leader
- Golden West Cowboys as Cowboy Band
- Smiley Burnette as Smiley Burnette
- Ethan Laidlaw as Henchman

== Bibliography ==
- Martin, Len D. Columbia Checklist: The Feature Films, Serials, Cartoons, and Short Subjects of Columbia Pictures Corporation, 1922-1988. McFarland, 1991.
