= Chris Alcaide =

American film and television actor (1923–2004)

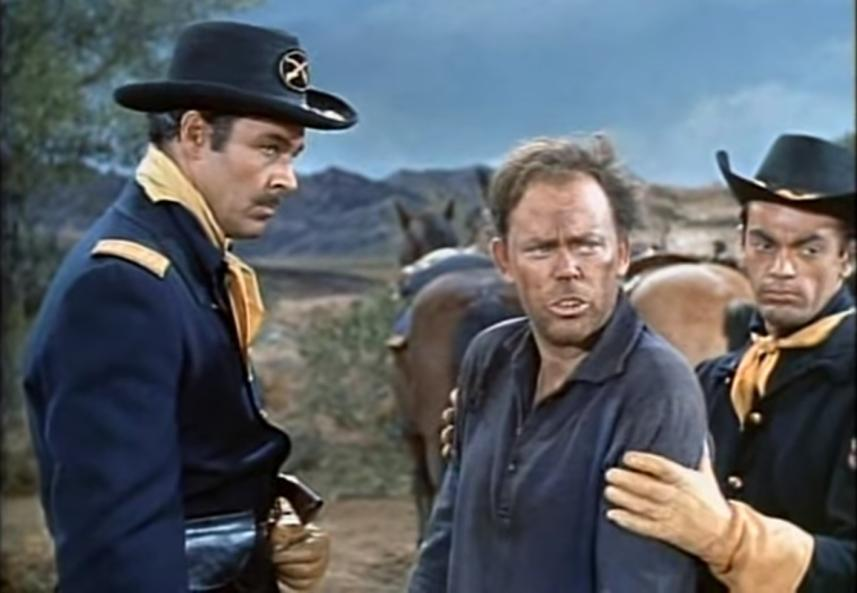
- Alcaide (left) with James Parnell and Sherwood Price in Bonanza, 1960
- Born: October 22, 1923; Youngstown, Ohio, U.S.
- Died: June 30, 2004 (aged 80); Palm Springs, California, U.S.
- Resting place: Desert Memorial Park, Cathedral City, California
- Occupations: Film and television actor
- Spouses: Georgia Holt (m. 1948; div. 1951) Peri Alcaide (m. 1956)

Chris Alcaide (October 22, 1923 – June 30, 2004) was an American film and television actor. He mostly appeared on western television shows including, Gunsmoke, Bonanza, Rawhide, Wanted: Dead or Alive, Trackdown, Laramie, Death Valley Days, Tales of Wells Fargo, Maverick, Zane Grey Theatre and The Rifleman.

== Early life ==
Alcaide moved to Hollywood in 1942 and worked as a bouncer at the Hollywood Palladium. He served in the U.S. Army from 1943 to 1946 during World War II. After the war, he returned to the Hollywood Palladium and joined the Ben Bard Players, in 1948.

== Career ==
In 1958, Alcaide was the original choice of star as the lead role in Black Saddle, but studio executives thought he was too associated with badman roles and chose Peter Breck for the lead role. While filming the pilot, Alcaide injured his back in a fall causing permanent damage to his back that bothered him for years.

From 1972 to 1985, Alcaide ran a photography studio named "Peri's Pictures" in Los Angeles, California, with his wife, Peri.

For his contributions to film and television, Chris Alcaide has a star on the Hollywood Walk of Fame.

== Death ==
Alcaide died of cancer on June 30, 2004, at Palm Springs, California, at the age of 80.

== Filmography ==
=== Film ===
Year	Title	Role	Notes
1950	The Glass Menagerie	Eddie	uncredited
1952	Smoky Canyon	Lars - Henchman	uncredited
1952	Laramie Mountains	Jeff - Henchman	uncredited
1952	Cripple Creek	Jeff	uncredited
1952	Junction City	Jarvis	
1952	The Kid from Broken Gun	Matt Fallon	uncredited
1953	Man in the Dark	Pursuing Detective	uncredited
1953	The 49th Man	Agent Manning	uncredited
1953	Mission Over Korea	Army Airplane Check Officer	uncredited
1953	The Big Heat	George Rose	
1953	Bad for Each Other	Pete Olzoneski	
1954	It Should Happen to You	Air Force Man at Ceremony	uncredited
1954	Overland Pacific	Jason	
1954	Prince Valiant	Knight	uncredited
1954	Massacre Canyon	Running Horse	
1954	The Miami Story	Robert Bishop	
1954	The Outlaw Stallion	Truxton	uncredited
1954	The Black Dakotas	Burke	uncredited
1955	Jupiter's Darling	Cpl. Ballol	uncredited
1955	Chicago Syndicate	Nate - a Thug	
1955	The Private War of Major Benson	Truck Driver	uncredited
1955	Apache Ambush	Lt. Shaffin	uncredited
1955	Duel on the Mississippi	Anton	
1955	Illegal	Cop at Property Desk	uncredited
1955	I Died a Thousand Times	Sheriff's Deputy	uncredited
1956	The Benny Goodman Story	Boatman	uncredited
1956	The Houston Story	Chris Barker	
1956	Backlash	Dick Lawrence	uncredited
1956	Outside the Law	Military Policeman	uncredited
1956	The Rawhide Years	Henchman	uncredited
1956	Gunslinger	Deputy Joshua Tate	
1956	Miami Exposé	Morrie Pell	
1957	Rock All Night	Angie	
1957	Monkey on My Back	Benjy - Drug Pusher	uncredited
1957	Carnival Rock	Slug	
1958	The Power of the Resurrection	Officer	
1958	Day of the Badman	Monte Hayes	
1958	Joy Ride	Stewart	
1959	Vice Raid	Eddie	
1962	Kid Galahad	Danzig Hood	uncredited
1966	The Oscar	Ledbetter	
1982	Hammett	Man in Boardroom	
1987	Assassination	Chief Justice	

=== Television ===
Year	Title	Role	Notes
1953	I Led 3 Lives	Norton	1 episode
1953–1957	The Ford Television Theatre	George Timpkin/Luke/Johnny Parthos	4 episodes
1953–1954	The Adventures of Kit Carson		4 episodes
1954	Annie Oakley	Paul Dodson/Henchman Vic/Duke Jaegar	3 episodes
1954	Cavalcade of America		1 episode
1954	The Adventures of Rin Tin Tin	Indian	1 episode
1955–1961	Gunsmoke	Barnes/Clem Maddow/Cowboy/Ned Curry/Mike	5 episodes
1955	Buffalo Bill, Jr.	Henchman	1 episode
1955	Celebrity Playhouse		1 episode
1955–1957	Tales of the Texas Rangers	Clint Hollister/Slade/Ben Thomas	3 episodes
1955	The Adventures of Champion	Rustler/Keller	2 episodes
1955	Damon Runyon Theater	Ziggy Malone	2 episodes
1956–1958	Zane Grey Theater	Morgan - Gunman at Bar/Nate Evers/Vic Gruner/Henry C. 'Clay' Chulhane/Deputy Jason Merrick/Marshal Bly Newsome	6 episodes
1956	Matinee Theatre	Norris	1 episode
1956–1962	Cheyenne	Deputy Hack/Gary Thomas	2 episodes
1956–1958	Broken Arrow	Brown Eagle/Johnny Brett	2 episodes
1957	Sugarfoot	Clay Horton	1 episode
1957	Colt .45	Grimes	1 episode
1957	Maverick	Tony Cadiz	1 episode
1957–1958	Trackdown	Elijah Collins/Cass Desmond	2 episodes
1957	The Silent Service	Shore Patrol Lieut./Stick	2 episodes
1957–1958	The Californians	Larson/John Gordon	2 episodes
1957	Casey Jones	Dan Durgin	1 episode
1958	The Sheriff of Cochise	Earl Parker	1 episode
1958	The Magical World of Disney	Henchman/Outlaw #3	2 episodes
1958–1960	Richard Diamond, Private Detective	First Thug/Robert Knight	2 episodes
1958	The Court of Last Resort	Enright	2 episodes
1958	Official Detective	Al	1 episode
1958	State Trooper	Joe Forrest/Bart	2 episodes
1958–1960	The Texan	Townsman/Wade Clinton/Tubbs/Deputy Luke Smith	4 episodes
1958–1960	Tales of Wells Fargo	Nate Holley/Notch Duggin/Win Partridge	3 episodes
1958	Panic!	Joe	1 episode
1958–1959	Man Without a Gun	Johnny Kansas	2 episodes
1958	U.S. Marshal	Val/Marko Corbin	2 episodes
1959–1965	Death Valley Days	Ben Higgins/Hugo Adley/Charlie Winslow/Murdock/Jules Reni/Hackett	6 episodes
1959	Frontier Doctor	Ed Slater	1 episode
1959–1963	Have Gun - Will Travel	Morgan - Mine Manager/Bill Whitney/Big Fontana/Brock March	4 episodes
1959–1962	Perry Mason	Jerry Morrow/Gus Wiler	2 episodes
1959	Bronco	Brutus Traxel	1 episode
1959	Border Patrol	Douglas	1 episode
1959–1961	Lawman	Ben Moray/Lou Quade	2 episodes
1959	Black Saddle	Bill Logan	1 episode
1959	Wanted: Dead or Alive	Bull Sherman/Cree Colter S2 E15 "Chain Gang"	2 episodes
1959–1962	The Rifleman	Hamp Ferris S1 E24 /Panama Billings/Lon Berry/Spence Hadley/Schroeder/Benjamin Casper/Manny Carney/Dave Rankin/Ross	10 episodes
1959	Shotgun Slade	Galt Peterson	1 episode
1959	This is the Life	Eddie	1 episode
1959–1960	Law of the Plainsman	Charlie Wolf/Dan/Conroy	3 episodes
1959	Rawhide	Gates	S1:E19, "Incident of the Dry Drive"
1960	Rawhide	Pagan	S2:E25, "Incident of the Arana Sacar"
1960	The Deputy	Fred Tanner	1 episode
1960–1967	Bonanza	Capt. James Bolton/Gus Hannah/Jim Blake	3 episodes
1960	Tate	Parney	1 episode
1960	This Man Dawson	Burt Hughes	1 episode
1960	The Roaring 20's	Nick Zorich	1 episode
1960–1962	Laramie	Will Brent/Greg/Townsman Starting Fight/U.S. Marshal/Ben Yates	5 episodes
1960	Michael Shayne	Gus Hartman	1 episode
1960	The Detectives	Norris	1 episode
1960	Dante	Nick Steele	1 episode
1961	Two Faces West	Corey Willis	1 episode
1961	Klondike	Greyson	1 episode
1961	Stagecoach West	Reb/Hogart	2 episodes
1961	The Tall Man	Joe Durango	1 episode
1961	87th Prencinct	Sgt. Briggs	1 episode
1961	Rawhide	Craddock	S4:E6, "The Inside Man"
1962	Shannon	Jack O' Hare	1 episode
1962	Frontier Circus	Paul	1 episode
1963	Rawhide	O'Toole	S5:E26, "Incident of the Black Ace"
1963	The Dakotas	Merrick	1 episode
1963–1965	The Virginian	Cowhand/Howard Heller	2 episodes
1963	The Greatest Show on Earth	Hodges	1 episode
1964–1966	Daniel Boone	Flathead Joseph/Noah Pierce	2 episodes
1964	Destry	Ace	1 episode
1964	The Outer Limits	Colonel Hal Danvers	1 episode
1965	The Fugitive	Lt. Horvath	1 episode
1965	A Man Called Shenandoah	Frank Abbott	1 episode
1965–1966	Branded	Karp - Henchman/John F. Parker	2 episodes
1966	Run for Your Life	1st Killer	1 episodes
1966–1968	The Big Valley	Marshal Ralston/First Horse Thief/Glenn/Ryan	4 episodes
1967	T.H.E. Cat	Bayo	1 episode
1967	Lassie	Banning	1 episode
1967	Dragnet	Richard Madden	1 episode
1967	Hondo	Selby	1 episode
1968	Land of the Giants	Sgt. Arnak	1 episode
