= Ray Nazarro =

American film and television director, producer, screenwriter

- Born: Raymond Alfred Nazarro; September 25, 1902; Boston, Massachusetts, US
- Died: September 8, 1986 (aged 83); Studio City, Los Angeles, California, US
- Occupations: Film and television director, producer, screenwriter
- Years active: 1929–1964

Ray Nazarro (aka "Ray" and "Nat;" né Raymond Alfred Nazarro; September 25, 1902 – September 8, 1986) was an American film and television director, producer, and screenwriter. Budd Boetticher called him a "ten-day picture guy."

== Career ==
Born in Boston, Nazarro entered the movie business during the silent era. He initially worked in two-reelers. In 1945 he became a feature-film director at Columbia Pictures, beginning with Outlaws of the Rockies.

Nazarro was one of Hollywood's busiest directors, directing as many as 13 pictures in one year. He made budget Westerns almost exclusively. From 1945 to 1948 he alternated between directing action Westerns with Columbia's leading cowboy star Charles Starrett and directing the "rural rhythm" band The Hoosier Hot Shots in a series of musical-comedy Westerns. When the musical series lapsed in 1948, Nazarro concentrated on the Starrett Westerns, now featuring the Durango Kid character.

In 1950 Nazarro was assigned a non-Western "B" picture, David Harding, Counterspy. This resulted in Nazarro receiving more non-Western assignments and slightly higher budgets. He was also entrusted with more ambitious Western stories, with an emphasis on action but also a serious, elegiac view of the West, like Al Jennings of Oklahoma (1951) starring Dan Duryea.

In 1952, Nazarro received an Academy Award nomination for Best Story for Bullfighter and the Lady. Budd Boetticher, who had been a bullfighter, told his life story to Nazarro when he was working for him as an assistant director. Boetticher says he wrote it down, and Nazarro typed it up and sold the project to Dore Schary at MGM. Boetticher said that was the reason for Nazarro getting screen credit.

When Columbia suspended B-Western production in 1952, Nazarro's contract with Columbia ended after he had made around 60 films for the studio. He next made Gun Belt for United Artists and followed that with The Bandits of Corsica, also for UA, and Kansas Pacific for Allied Artists Pictures, although both were released before Gun Belt. He continued making films for UA and Columbia until Apache Territory (1958). He also made The Hired Gun (1957) for MGM.

In the late 1950s, with the market for B-Westerns drying up in America, Nazarro restarted his career in Europe, making spaghetti Westerns. He also began working in television. His last film was the German-made Jayne Mansfield thriller Dog Eat Dog, released in 1964.

Nazarro died on September 8, 1986, and is buried in Chapel of the Pines Crematory.

== Selected filmography ==
Film
Year	Film	Notes
1932	Runt Page	Credited as Raymond Nazarro; Short film
1934	Jimmy the Gent	Writer, story "The Heir Chaser"
1935	Suicide Squad	Writer
1935	Roaring Roads	as Reymond Nazarro
1945	Outlaws of the Rockies	
1945	Song of the Prairie	
1945	Texas Panhandle	
1946	Roaring Rangers	
1946	Throw a Saddle on a Star	
1946	Gunning for Vengeance	
1946	Galloping Thunder	
1946	That Texas Jamboree	
1946	Two-Fisted Stranger	
1946	The Desert Horseman	
1946	Cowboy Blues	
1946	Heading West	
1946	Singing on the Trail	
1946	Terror Trail	
1946	Lone Star Moonlight	
1947	Over the Santa Fe Trail	
1947	The Lone Hand Texan	
1947	West of Dodge City	
1947	Law of the Canyon	
1947	Buckaroo from Powder River	
1947	Last Days of Boot Hill	
1947	Rose of Santa Rosa	
1948	Six-Gun Law	
1948	Phantom Valley	
1948	Song of Idaho	
1948	West of Sonora	
1948	Blazing Across the Pecos	
1948	The Arkansas Swing	
1948	Trail to Laredo	
1948	Singin' Spurs	
1948	El Dorado Pass	
1948	Quick on the Trigger	
1948	Smoky Mountain Melody	
1949	Challenge of the Range	
1949	Home in San Antone	
1949	Laramie	
1949	The Blazing Trail	
1949	South of Death Valley	
1949	Bandits of El Dorado	
1949	Renegades of the Sage	
1950	Trail of the Rustlers	
1950	The Palomino	
1950	Outcast of Black Mesa	
1950	Texas Dynamo	
1950	Hoedown	
1950	David Harding, Counterspy	
1950	Streets of Ghost Town	
1950	The Tougher They Come	
1950	Frontier Outpost	
1951	Al Jennings of Oklahoma	
1951	Flame of Stamboul	
1951	Fort Savage Raiders	
1951	China Corsair	
1951	Cyclone Fury	
1951	The Kid from Amarillo	
1952	Indian Uprising	
1952	Laramie Mountains	
1952	Montana Territory	
1952	The Rough, Tough West	
1952	Cripple Creek	
1952	Junction City	
1953	Kansas Pacific	First film released by another studio (Allied Artists) after contract with Columbia ended
1953	The Bandits of Corsica	Second film made for United Artists
1953	Gun Belt	First film made (for United Artists) since leaving Columbia
1954	Southwest Passage	
1954	The Lone Gun	
1954	The Black Dakotas	
1955	Top Gun	
1956	The White Squaw	
1957	The Phantom Stagecoach	
1957	The Hired Gun	Made for MGM
1957	Domino Kid	
1958	Return to Warbow	
1958	Apache Territory	Last US made film
1964	Dog Eat Dog	
Television
Year	Title	Notes
1951	The Range Rider	Unknown episodes
1954–1956	Annie Oakley	14 episodes
1955	Buffalo Bill, Jr.	8 episodes
1955–1960	Fury	8 episodes, produced two episodes
1959	Mickey Spillane's Mike Hammer	3 episodes

== Award nominations ==
Year	Award	Result	Category	Film
1952	Academy Award	Nominated	Best Writing, Motion Picture Story	Bullfighter and the Lady (Shared with Budd Boetticher)
