= Fred F. Sears =

American actor (1913–1957)

- Born: Frederick Francis Sears; July 7, 1913; Boston, Massachusetts, U.S.
- Died: November 30, 1957 (aged 44); Hollywood, California, U.S.
- Education: Boston College
- Occupations: Actor, director
- Years active: 1948–1957
- Spouse: Mary Ann Hawkins (m. 1955; div. 1956)

Frederick Francis Sears (July 7, 1913 – November 30, 1957) was an American film actor and director.

== Biography ==
Sears, formerly based in Boston as a dramatic director and instructor, was hired as a dialogue director by Columbia Pictures in 1946. He began playing incidental roles in Columbia's productions. The actors in Columbia's stock company were expected to perform in any kind of film, from adventures to musicals, to two-reel comedy shorts, to westerns and serials. Sears gradually received larger supporting roles (as "Fred Sears"), notably in the popular Blondie series and the long-running Charles Starrett western series. By 1949 Sears was so well established in the close-knit Starrett unit that he was allowed to direct, and he continued to helm the Starrett westerns (as "Fred F. Sears") until the studio retired the series in 1952. Toward the end of the series's run, the films were being made so cheaply that the scripts would incorporate lengthy excerpts from older films. In Bonanza Town (1951), director Sears also had to appear as an actor, to match footage from his performance in West of Dodge City (1947).

Sears's budget-stretching skills attracted the attention of Columbia staff producer Sam Katzman. Katzman was a notoriously cheap producer, making topical films so quickly that they could be playing in theaters while the topic was still hot. Katzman recruited Sears for the 1952 serial Blackhawk, and after Sears was relieved of the Charles Starrett features, Katzman offered Sears full-time work in his unit. For the next five years Fred Sears worked steadily as a contract director, having no particular style or specialty of his own but capable of working in various genres. His most famous films are probably the Bill Haley musicals Rock Around the Clock and Don't Knock the Rock, and the science-fiction features Earth vs. the Flying Saucers, The Giant Claw, The Werewolf (1956 film) and The Night the World Exploded (several of which he also narrated).

Sears might have continued indefinitely with Sam Katzman but he died on November 30, 1957, at the age of 44. His final films were released posthumously.

== Filmography ==
=== Director ===
- Desert Vigilante (1949)
- Horsemen of the Sierras (1949)
- Across the Badlands (1950)
- Raiders of Tomahawk Creek (1950)
- Lightning Guns (1950)
- Prairie Roundup (1951)
- Ridin' the Outlaw Trail (1951)
- Snake River Desperadoes (1951)
- Bonanza Town (1951)
- Pecos River (1951)
- Smoky Canyon (1952)
- The Hawk of Wild River (1952)
- Blackhawk (serial) (1952, Serial)
- The Kid from Broken Gun (1952) (final film in the Charles Starrett series)
- Last Train from Bombay (1952)
- Target Hong Kong (1953)
- Ambush at Tomahawk Gap (1953)
- The 49th Man (1953)
- Sky Commando (1953)
- Mission Over Korea (1953)
- The Nebraskan (1953)
- El Alaméin (1953)
- Overland Pacific (1954)
- Massacre Canyon (1954)
- The Miami Story (1954)
- The Outlaw Stallion (1954)
- Wyoming Renegades (1955)
- Cell 2455, Death Row (1955)
- Chicago Syndicate (1955)
- Apache Ambush (1955)
- Teen-Age Crime Wave (1955)
- Inside Detroit (1956)
- Fury at Gunsight Pass (1956)
- Rock Around the Clock (1956)
- Earth vs. the Flying Saucers (1956)
- The Werewolf (1956)
- Miami Exposé (1956)
- Cha-Cha-Cha Boom! (1956)
- Don't Knock the Rock (1956)
- Rumble on the Docks (1956)
- Utah Blaine (1957)
- The Giant Claw (1957)
- The Night the World Exploded (1957)
- Calypso Heat Wave (1957)
- Escape from San Quentin (1957)
- The World Was His Jury (1958)
- Going Steady (1958)
- Crash Landing (1958)
- Badman's Country (1958)
- Ghost of the China Sea (1958)

=== Actor ===
- The Return of Rusty (1946) - Detective (uncredited)
- The Jolson Story (1946) - Oscar - Cutter (uncredited)
- Blondie Knows Best (1946) - Man on Park Bench (uncredited)
- Lone Star Moonlight (1946) - Announcer (uncredited)
- The Lone Hand Texan (1947) - Sam Jason (uncredited)
- Millie's Daughter (1947) - Escort Manager (uncredited)
- West of Dodge City (1947) - Henry Hardison (uncredited)
- Blondie's Holiday (1947) - Gambler (uncredited)
- Law of the Canyon (1947) - Dr. Middleton (uncredited)
- For the Love of Rusty (1947) - Doc Levy (uncredited)
- The Corpse Came C.O.D. (1947) - Police Detertive Dave Short
- Sport of Kings (1947)
- The Son of Rusty (1947) - E.A. Thompson (uncredited)
- Down to Earth (1947) - Bill - Orchestra Leader (uncredited)
- Blondie in the Dough (1947) - Quinn
- Her Husband's Affairs (1947) - Man at Mayor's Party (uncredited)
- It Had to Be You (1947) - Fireman #2 / Tilleman (uncredited)
- Blondie's Anniversary (1947) - Bert Dalton
- Phantom Valley (1948) - Ben Theibold (uncredited)
- The Return of the Whistler (1948) - Crandall (uncredited)
- Song of Idaho (1948) - Himself - Radio Announcer (uncredited)
- Adventures in Silverado (1948) - Hatfield
- The Fuller Brush Man (1948) - Bartender (uncredited)
- Whirlwind Raiders (1948) - Tracy Beaumont
- Singin' Spurs (1948) - Mr. Hanson
- The Gallant Blade (1948) - Lawrence (Soldier in Woods)
- Rusty Leads the Way (1948) - Jack Coleman (uncredited)
- The Return of October (1948) - Reporter (uncredited)
- Smoky Mountain Melody (1948) - Mr. Crump
- The Man from Colorado (1949) - Veteran (uncredited)
- Shockproof (1949) - Clerk (uncredited)
- Slightly French (1949) - Cameraman (uncredited)
- Boston Blackie's Chinese Venture (1949) - Police Chemist (uncredited)
- The Crime Doctor's Diary (1949) - Ballistics Man (uncredited)
- The Lone Wolf and His Lady (1949) - Tex Talbot (uncredited)
- Home in San Antone (1949) - Radio Announcer Breezy
- Laramie (1949) - Col. Ron Dennison
- Johnny Allegro (1949) - Desk Clerk (uncredited)
- The Blazing Trail (1949) - Luke Masters
- The Secret of St. Ives (1949) - Narrator (voice, uncredited)
- South of Death Valley (1949) - Sam Ashton
- Bandits of El Dorado (1949) - Ranger Captain Richard Henley
- Tokyo Joe (1949) - Medical Major (uncredited)
- Rusty's Birthday (1949) - Policeman (uncredited)
- Renegades of the Sage (1949) - Lt. Jones
- Texas Dynamo (1950) - Hawkins
- Hoedown (1950) - Sam Baker (uncredited)
- David Harding, Counterspy (1950) - Peters (uncredited)
- On the Isle of Samoa (1950) - Pilot (uncredited)
- Convicted (1950) - Fingerprint Man (uncredited)
- Counterspy Meets Scotland Yard (1950) - Agent Peters
- Frontier Outpost (1950) - Major Copeland
- Lightning Guns (1950) - Opening Off Screen Narrator (voice, uncredited)
- Gasoline Alley (1951) - Smite (uncredited)
- My True Story (1951) - E. H. Carlyle
- Fort Savage Raiders (1951) - Col. Sutter
- The Big Gusher (1951) - Sheriff (uncredited)
- Never Trust a Gambler (1951) - State Trooper (uncredited)
- Bonanza Town (1951) - Henry Hardison
- Cyclone Fury (1951) - Captain Barham
- Saturday's Hero (1951) - Reporter (uncredited)
- The Family Secret (1951) - Laboratory Analyst (uncredited)
- The Kid from Amarillo (1951) - Jonathan Cole
- Pecos River (1951) - Townsman on Porch Listening to Music (uncredited)
- Laramie Mountains (1952) - Major Markham
- Brave Warrior (1952) - Opening Narrator (voice, uncredited)
- The Rough, Tough West (1952) - Pete Walker / Doctor (uncredited)
- The Kid from Broken Gun (1952) - Opening Narrator (voice, uncredited)
- Rainbow 'Round My Shoulder (1952) - Director (uncredited)
- Serpent of the Nile (1953) - Off-Screen Narrator (voice, uncredited)
- Flame of Calcutta (1953) - Opening Off-Screen Narrator (voice, uncredited)
- The Werewolf (1956) - Narrator (voice, uncredited)
- The Night the World Exploded (1957) - Narrator (voice, uncredited)
- The Giant Claw (1957) - Narrator (voice, uncredited)
- Crash Landing (1958) - Opening Off-Screen Narrator (voice, uncredited) (final film role)

== Bibliography ==
- Dixon, Wheeler Winston. Lost in the Fifties: Recovering Phantom Hollywood. Southern Illinois University Press, 2005.
