= Smiley Burnette =

American country music performer and comedic actor (1911–1967)

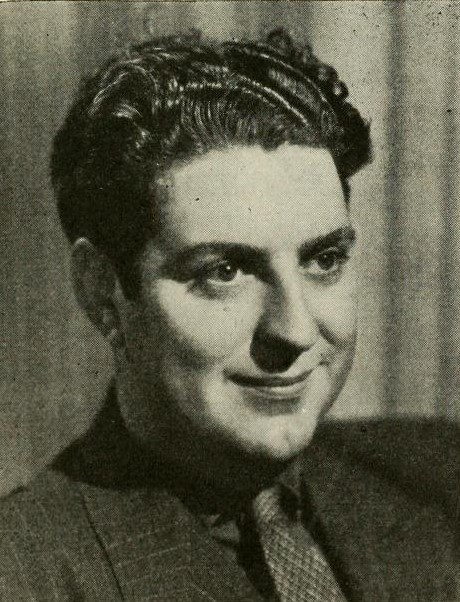
- Burnette in 1937

Background information
- Also known as: Smiley Burnette
- Born: Lester Alvin Burnett; March 18, 1911; Summum, Illinois, U.S.
- Died: February 16, 1967 (aged 55) Encino, California, U.S.
- Genre: Country music
- Occupations: Singer-songwriter; musician; film actor; inventor
- Instruments: Accordion, guitar, banjo, many others
- Years active: 1933–1967
- Labels: Abbott; Starday; Capitol; Columbia; ARA; Rancho
- Website: Smiley Burnette.org

Lester Alvin Burnett (March 18, 1911 – February 16, 1967), better known as Smiley Burnette, was an American country music performer and a comedic actor in Western films and on radio and TV, playing sidekick to Gene Autry, Roy Rogers, and other B-movie cowboys. He was also a prolific singer-songwriter who is reported to have played proficiently over 100 musical instruments, sometimes more than one simultaneously. His career, beginning in 1934, spanned four decades, including a regular role on CBS-TV's Petticoat Junction in the 1960s.

== Biography ==
Lester A. Burnett (he added the final "e" later in life) was born in Summum, Illinois, on March 18, 1911, and grew up in Ravenwood, Missouri. He began singing as a child and learned to play a wide variety of instruments by ear, yet never learned to read or write music. In his teens, he worked in vaudeville, and starting in 1929, at the state's first commercial radio station, WDZ-AM in Tuscola, Illinois.

Burnette came by his nickname while creating a character for a WDZ children's program. He was reading Mark Twain's "The Celebrated Jumping Frog of Calaveras County" at the time, which included a character named Jim Smiley. He named the radio character Mr. Smiley and soon adopted the moniker as his own, dropping the title.

=== Film career ===
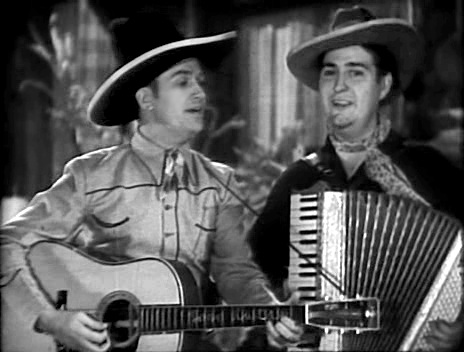
Burnette (r) with Gene Autry in In Old Santa Fe (1934)

His break came in December 1933, when he was hired by Gene Autry to play accordion on National Barn Dance on Chicago's WLS-AM, on which Autry was the major star. As sound films became popular, Hollywood sought musical talent for Western films, and in 1934, producer Nat Levine cast Autry and Burnette in their film debut (unbilled) as part of a bluegrass band in Mascot Pictures' In Old Santa Fe starring Ken Maynard. Burnette sang and played accordion, and the film included two of his compositions.

He had other small parts until a secondary but more prominent role in the 1935 serial The Adventures of Rex and Rinty. That same year, Levine gave Autry his first starring role in the 12-part serial The Phantom Empire, with Burnette playing Oscar, a comic-relief role. Mascot was soon absorbed by Republic Pictures. During Republic's formative years, Burnette played occasional character roles, sometimes wearing an ordinary business suit, in mainstream features and its first Dick Tracy serial. Burnette went on to great success, though, as Gene Autry's comic sidekick Frog Millhouse, with his trademark floppy black hat and trick voice (imitating a deep, froglike croak). Autry and Burnette made 62 feature-length musical Westerns for Republic.

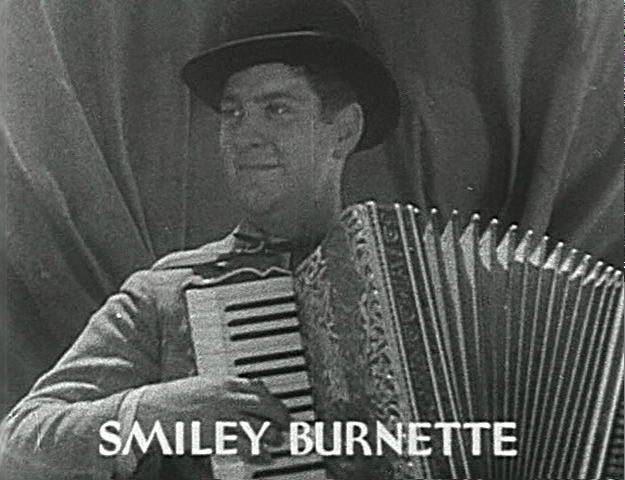
Trailer for Oh, Susanna! (1936)

By 1940, Smiley Burnette ranked second only to Autry in a Boxoffice magazine popularity poll of Western stars, the lone sidekick among the top 10 (though offscreen, he earned a reputation as being moody and temperamental), and when Autry left for World War II service, Burnette was elevated to top billing, with Eddie Dew, Sunset Carson, and Bob Livingston alternating as the cowboy lead. Burnette also appeared in nine films with Roy Rogers. Burnette's movie horse, white with a black-ringed left eye, also became famous, first as Black-eyed Nellie, then as Ring-eyed Nellie, and finally as just Ring Eye.

Burnett left Republic in June 1944. In 1945, he signed with Columbia Pictures, where he became the sidekick to Charles Starrett in the new Durango Kid series. Starrett and Burnette were paired in 56 films, from 1945 to 1952. When Starrett retired, Burnette was still under contract, so Columbia teamed him with Jock Mahoney for a new series of Westerns. The pilot feature, which began filming on May 6, 1952, was completed but never released; Columbia discontinued its program Westerns one month later. Columbia then reassigned Burnette to the six remaining films in its Gene Autry series, reuniting Burnette with his former partner.

=== Singer-songwriter ===
Smiley Burnette wrote more than 400 songs and sang a significant number of them on screen. His Western classic, "Ridin' Down the Canyon (To Watch the Sun Go Down)", was later recorded by Willie Nelson, Riders in the Sky, and Johnnie Lee Wills. His other compositions included "On the Strings of My Lonesome Guitar" (Jimmy Wakely's theme song in the 1940s), "Fetch Me Down My Trusty .45", "Ridin' All Day", and "It's Indian Summer", as well as "The Wind Sings a Cowboy Song", "The Old Covered Wagon", and "Western Lullaby". He also composed musical scores for such films as The Painted Stallion and Waterfront Lady. His songs were recorded by a wide range of singers, including Bing Crosby, Ferlin Husky, and Leon Russell. His performance of "Steamboat Bill" appeared on Billboard's country chart in 1939.

=== Inventor ===
Burnette devised and built some of his unusual musical instruments in his home workshop. His "Jassackaphone", for example, which he played in the film The Singing Cowboy, resembled an organ with pipes, levers, and pull mechanisms.

In the 1940s, he invented and patented an early home audiovisual system called Cinevision Talkies. Each package contained a 78 rpm record with four of his songs and fifteen 35 mm slides. The slides were to be projected in order and advanced each time a short tone played on the record during the songs. An inside cover of the record album was white so those with no projector and screen could simply shine a flashlight through the slides and view them on the cover. He also devised more than a dozen clever uses for a common wire clothes hanger and demonstrated several of them during a TV show guest appearance.

=== Publicity and promotion ===
Hollywood stars usually left their publicity and promotion to the studios that employed them, but Smiley Burnette took charge of his promotion personally. He was highly aware of his box-office value and shrewdly merchandised his name and likeness. He organized a national Smiley Burnette Fan Club, aimed mostly at the juvenile audience, and sold autographed photos and souvenirs to club members. He made additional money by making personal appearances at theaters showing his films. Burnette's base of operations was Springfield, Missouri, where he produced and hosted a nationally syndicated, 15-minute radio program, The Smiley Burnette Show, through RadiOzark Enterprises. He also made regular appearances on ABC-TV's Ozark Jubilee from Springfield.

Gene Autry retired from motion pictures in 1953, and other cowboy stars had either left the movies or were winding down their screen careers. With the studios no longer interested in making B Westerns, Burnette turned to broadcasting and made guest appearances on many country music radio and TV shows, including Louisiana Hayride, the Grand Ole Opry, and Ranch Party.

In early 1957, when quiz shows were popular, he filmed a pilot for a proposed ABC-TV series to originate from Springfield called Pig 'N Poke, a quiz show with a country theme, although ABC did not buy the show.

Burnette enjoyed cooking, and in the 1950s, he opened a restaurant chain called The Checkered Shirt, the first of the A-frame drive-ins. The first location was in Orlando, Florida, and two locations still exist in California (Redding and Escondido), though they are no longer owned by the Burnette family.

As the 1960s began, Burnette continued to make personal appearances at drive-ins, fairs, hospitals, town squares, and rodeos. Among other venues, he once appeared with Dewey Brown and the Oklahoma Playboys at a Friday-night dance at Jump's Roller Rink in Fairfax, Oklahoma.

In the mid-1960s, he portrayed railway engineer Charley Pratt on the CBS-TV programs Petticoat Junction (106 episodes) and Green Acres (seven episodes).

=== Death ===
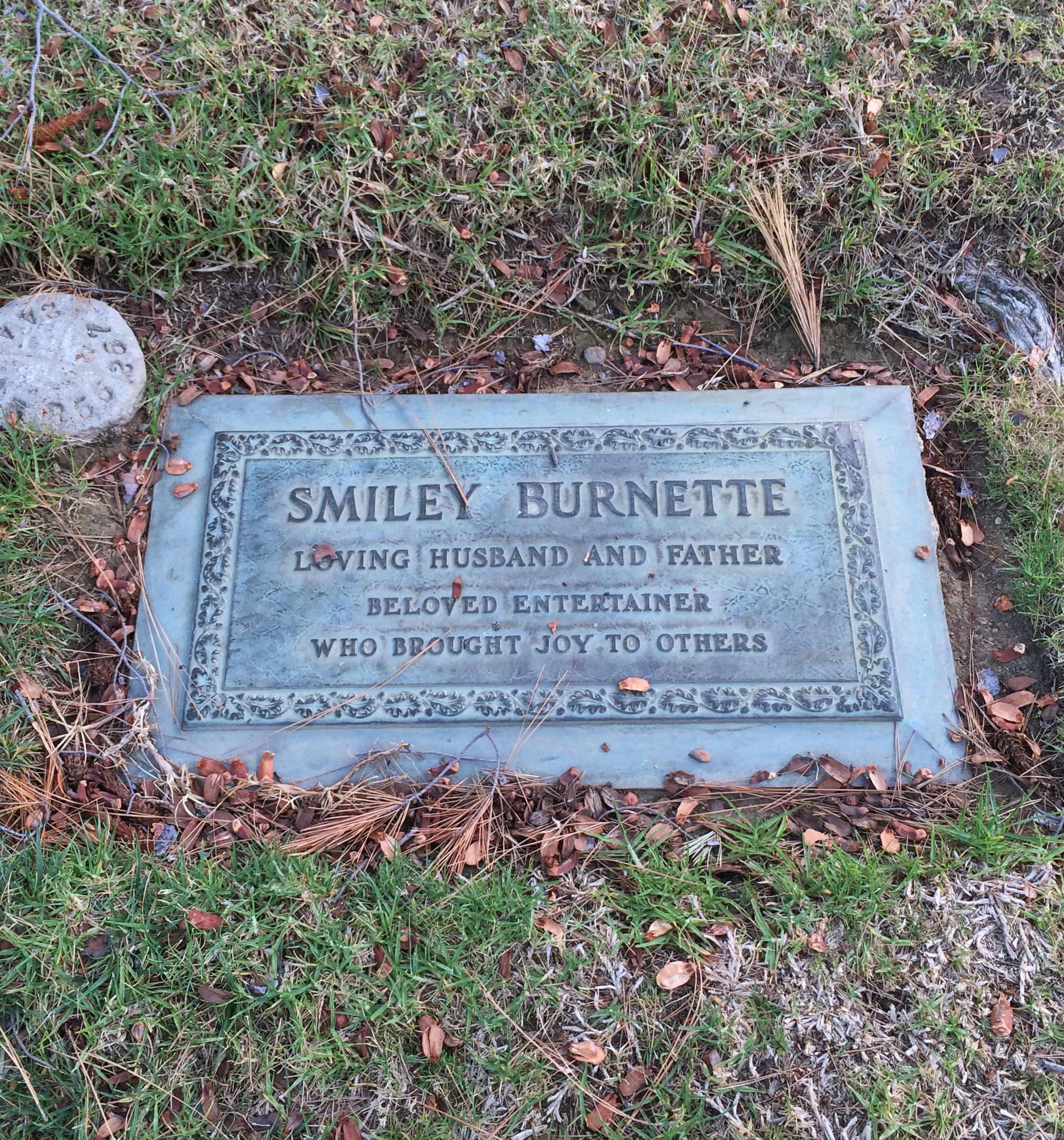
Grave of Smiley Burnette, at Forest Lawn Hollywood Hills

Just after filming wrapped for the fourth season of Petticoat Junction, Burnette became ill and died on February 16, 1967, in Encino, California, from leukemia and was interred in Forest Lawn Memorial Park in Hollywood Hills, California.

== Legacy ==
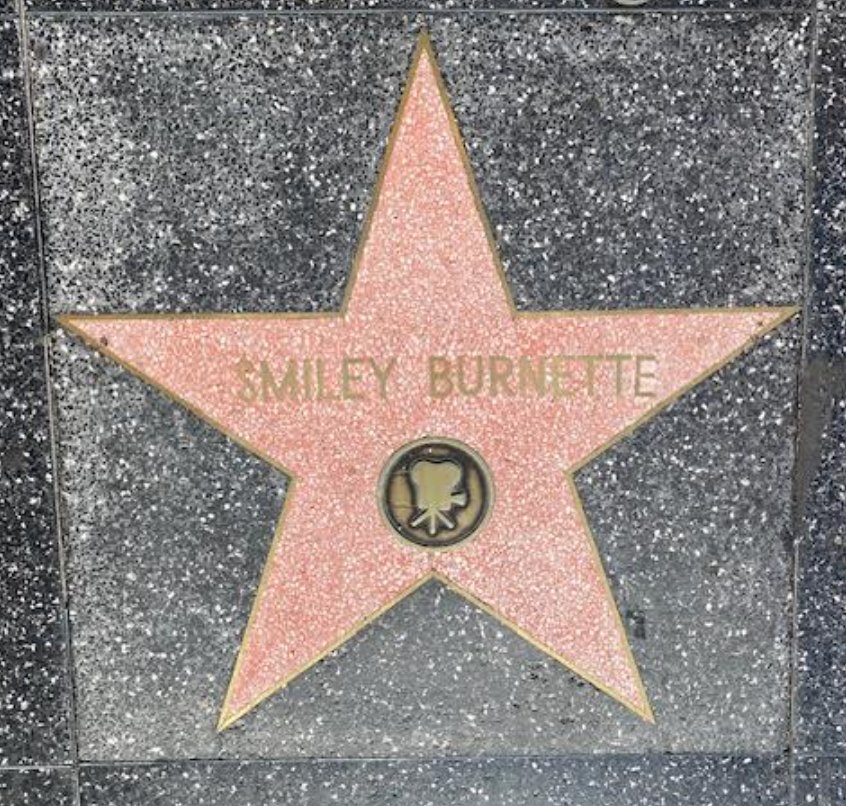
Burnett's star on the Hollywood Walk of Fame.

Burnette donated his original hat and shirt to the Cowboy Hall of Fame in Oklahoma City, Oklahoma, in 1962. In 1971, he was inducted posthumously into the Nashville Songwriters Hall of Fame.

For his contributions to the film industry, Burnette was inducted posthumously into the Hollywood Walk of Fame in 1986 with a motion pictures star located at 6125 Hollywood Boulevard. In 1998, he was inducted into the Western Music Association. On May 5, 2012, he was inducted into the Cowtown Society of Western Music Hall of Fame as a Hero.

Burnette is mentioned in the Statler Brothers' 1973 country music hit "Whatever Happened to Randolph Scott?", a song that mourns the loss of the white-hat cowboy heroes of the past.

== Selected filmography ==
- In Old Santa Fe (1934) as Lester Burnette (uncredited)
- The Marines Are Coming (1934) as Sailor Delivering Flowers to Bill (uncredited)
- Mystery Mountain (1934, Serial) as Lake Teamster [Ch. 6-7] (uncredited)
- Arizona Bad Man (1935) as Credits Singer (uncredited)
- The Phantom Empire (1935, Serial) as Oscar
- Lightning Triggers (1935) as Singer Over Opening Credits (uncredited)
- The Adventures of Rex and Rinty (1935, Serial) as Jensen
- Tumbling Tumbleweeds (1935) as Smiley
- Harmony Lane (1935) as Singer (uncredited)
- Waterfront Lady (1935) as Musician
- Melody Trail (1935) as Frog Millhouse
- The Sagebrush Troubadour (1935) as Frog Millhouse
- The Singing Vagabond (1935) as Frog Millhouse
- Hitch Hike Lady (1935) as Singer (uncredited)
- The Cheyenne Tornado (1935) as Singer Over Credits (uncredited)
- Red River Valley (1936) as Frog
- Doughnuts and Society (1936) as Mover #2
- Comin' Round the Mountain (1936) as Frog Millhouse
- The Singing Cowboy (1936) as Frog Millhouse
- Hearts in Bondage (1936) as Rammer (uncredited)
- Undersea Kingdom (1936) as Briny Deep
- The Border Patrolman (1936) as Chuck Owens
- Guns and Guitars (1936) as Frog Millhouse
- Oh, Susanna! (1936) as Frog Millhouse
- Ride, Ranger, Ride (1936) as Frog Millhouse
- The Big Show (1936) as Frog Millhouse
- The Old Corral (1936) as Frog Millhouse
- A Man Betrayed (1936) as Hillbilly
- Larceny on the Air (1937) as Jimmy
- Dick Tracy (1937, Serial) as Mike McGurk
- Round-Up Time in Texas (1937) as Frog Millhouse
- Git Along Little Dogies (1937) as Frog Millhouse
- Rootin' Tootin' Rhythm (1937) as Frog Milhouse
- Yodelin' Kid from Pine Ridge (1937) as Colonel Frog Millhouse
- Meet the Boyfriend (1937) as Band Leader
- Public Cowboy No. 1 (1937) as Frog Millhouse
- Boots and Saddles (1937) as Frog Millhouse
- Springtime in the Rockies (1937) as Frog Millhouse
- Manhattan Merry-Go-Round (1937) as Frog - Accordion Player
- The Old Barn Dance (1936) as Frog Millhouse
- Hollywood Stadium Mystery (1938) as himself
- Under Western Stars (1938) as Frog Millhouse
- Gold Mine in the Sky (1938) as Frog Millhouse
- The Man from Music Mountain (1938) as Frog Millhouse
- Billy the Kid Returns (1938) as Frog Millhouse
- Prairie Moon (1938) as Frog Millhouse
- Rhythm of the Saddle (1938) as Frog Millhouse
- Western Jamboree (1938) as Frog Millhouse
- Home on the Prairie (1939) as Frog Millhouse
- Mexicali Rose (1939) as Frog Millhouse
- Blue Montana Skies (1939) as Frog Millhouse
- Mountain Rhythm (1939) as Frog Millhouse
- Colorado Sunset (1939) as Frog Millhouse
- In Old Monterey (1939) as Frog Millhouse
- Rovin' Tumbleweeds (1939) as Frog Millhouse
- South of the Border (1939) as Frog Millhouse
- Rancho Grande (1940) as Frog Millhouse
- Gaucho Serenade (1940) as Frog Millhouse
- Carolina Moon (1940) as Frog Millhouse
- Ride, Tenderfoot, Ride (1940) as Frog Millhouse
- Ridin' on a Rainbow (1941) as Frog Millhouse
- Back in the Saddle (1941) as Frog Millhouse
- The Singing Hill (1941) as Frog Millhouse
- Sunset in Wyoming (1941) as Frog Millhouse
- Under Fiesta Stars (1941) as Frog Millhouse
- Down Mexico Way (1941) as Frog Millhouse
- Sierra Sue (1941) as Frog Millhouse
- Cowboy Serenade (1942) as Frog Millhouse
- Heart of the Rio Grande (1942) as Frog Millhouse
- Home in Wyomin' (1942) as Frog Millhouse
- Stardust on the Sage (1942) as Frog Millhouse
- Call of the Canyon (1942) as Frog Millhouse
- Bells of Capistrano (1942) as Frog Millhouse
- Heart of the Golden West (1942) as Frog Millhouse
- Idaho (1943) as Frog Millhouse
- King of the Cowboys (1943) as Frog Millhouse
- Silver Spurs (1943) as Frog Millhouse
- Beyond the Last Frontier (1943) as Frog Millhouse
- Raiders of Sunset Pass (1943) as Frog Millhouse
- Pride of the Plains (1944) as Frog Millhouse
- Beneath Western Skies (1944) as Sheriff Frog Millhouse
- The Laramie Trail (1944) as Frog Millhouse
- Call of the Rockies (1944) as Frog Millhouse
- Bordertown Trail (1944) as Frog Millhouse
- Code of the Prairie (1944) as Frog Millhouse
- Firebrands of Arizona (1944) as Frog Millhouse / Beefsteak Discoe
- Roaring Rangers (1946) as himself
- Gunning for Vengeance (1946) as himself
- Galloping Thunder (1946) as himself
- Two-Fisted Stranger (1946) as Deputy
- The Desert Horseman (1946) as himself
- Heading West (1946) as himself
- Landrush (1946) as himself
- Terror Trail (1946) as himself
- The Fighting Frontiersman (1946) as himself
- South of the Chisholm Trail (1947) as himself
- The Lone Hand Texan (1947) as himself
- West of Dodge City (1947) as himself, editor
- Law of the Canyon (1947) as himself
- Prairie Raiders (1947) as himself
- The Stranger from Ponca City (1947) as himself
- Riders of the Lone Star (1947) as himself
- Buckaroo from Powder River (1947) as himself
- Last Days of Boot Hill (1947) as Deputy
- Six-Gun Law (1948) as himself
- Phantom Valley (1948) as himself
- West of Sonora (1948) as himself
- Whirlwind Raiders (1948) as himself
- Blazing Across the Pecos (1948) as Marshall
- Trail to Laredo (1948) as himself
- El Dorado Pass (1948) as himself
- Quick on the Trigger (1948) as himself
- Challenge of the Range (1949) as himself
- Desert Vigilante (1949) as himself
- Laramie (1949) as himself
- The Blazing Trail (1949) as Marshall
- South of Death Valley (1949) as himself
- Bandits of El Dorado (1949) as Sheriff
- Horsemen of the Sierras (1949) as himself
- Renegades of the Sage (1949) as himself
- Trail of the Rustlers (1950) as himself
- Outcast of Black Mesa (1950) as himself
- Texas Dynamo (1950) as himself
- Streets of Ghost Town (1950) as himself
- Across the Badlands (1950) as himself
- Raiders of Tomahawk Creek (1950) as himself
- Frontier Outpost (1950) as himself
- Lightning Guns (1950) as himself
- Prairie Roundup (1951) as himself
- Ridin' the Outlaw Trail (1951) as himself
- Fort Savage Raiders (1951) as himself
- Whirlwind (1951) as himself
- Snake River Desperadoes (1951) as himself
- Bonanza Town (1951) as himself
- Cyclone Fury (1951) as himself
- The Kid from Amarillo (1951) as himself
- Pecos River (1951) as himself
- Smoky Canyon (1952) as himself
- The Hawk of Wild River (1952) as himself
- Laramie Mountains (1952) as Sergeant Smiley Burnette
- The Rough, Tough West (1952) as Fire Chief
- Junction City (1952) as himself
- The Kid from Broken Gun (1952) as himself
- Winning of the West (1953) as himself
- On Top of Old Smoky (1953) as himself
- Goldtown Ghost Riders (1953) as himself
- Pack Train (1953) as himself
- Saginaw Trail (1953) as himself
- Last of the Pony Riders (1953) as himself
