= Laramie (film) =

1949 film by Ray Nazarro

- Theatrical release poster
- Directed by: Ray Nazarro
- Screenplay by: Barry Shipman
- Produced by: Colbert Clark
- Starring: Charles Starrett; Fred F. Sears; Tommy Ivo; Elton Britt; Smiley Burnette
- Cinematography: Rex Wimpy
- Edited by: Paul Borofsky
- Production company: Columbia Pictures
- Distributed by: Columbia Pictures
- Release date: May 19, 1949
- Running time: 55 minutes
- Country: United States
- Language: English

Laramie is a 1949 American Western film directed by Ray Nazarro and written by Barry Shipman. The film stars Charles Starrett, Fred F. Sears, Tommy Ivo, Elton Britt and Smiley Burnette. The film was released on May 19, 1949, by Columbia Pictures. This was the thirty-seventh of 65 films in the Durango Kid series.

== Plot ==
Steve Holden is brought in to be a mediator to bring peace between the US Cavalry and the Indians. A local businessman is against the idea so he can continue to sell large amounts of rifles to the warring tribes. He uses the Regiment's Scout Cronin to assassinate the Indian chief and stir up a war. The film's climax reuses the stagecoach attack footage from Stagecoach (1939).

== Cast ==
- Charles Starrett as Steve Holden / The Durango Kid
- Smiley Burnette as Smiley Burnette
- Fred F. Sears as Col. Ron Dennison
- Tommy Ivo as Ronald Dennison Jr.
- Elton Britt as the Singing Sergeant
- Robert J. Wilke as Scout Cronin
- Jim Diehl as L.D. Brecker
- Myron Healey as Lieutenant Reed
- Jay Silverheels as Running Wolf
