= The Kid from Amarillo =

1951 film by Ray Nazarro

- Directed by: Ray Nazarro
- Written by: Barry Shipman
- Produced by: Colbert Clark
- Starring: Charles Starrett; Smiley Burnette; Harry Lauter
- Cinematography: Fayte M. Browne
- Edited by: Paul Borofsky
- Music by: Mischa Bakaleinikoff
- Production company: Columbia Pictures
- Distributed by: Columbia Pictures
- Release date: October 30, 1951
- Running time: 56 minutes
- Country: United States
- Language: English

The Kid from Amarillo is a 1951 American Western film directed by Ray Nazarro and starring Charles Starrett, Smiley Burnette and Harry Lauter. It is the 58th of 65 films in the Durango Kid series. The film was released in the United Kingdom as Silver Chains.

The film's sets were designed by the art director Charles Clague, with location shooting taking place at the Iverson Ranch.

== Cast ==
- Charles Starrett as Steve Ransom/The Durango Kid
- Smiley Burnette as Smiley Burnette
- Harry Lauter as Tom Mallory
- Fred F. Sears as Jonathan Cole
- Don Megowan as Rakim
- Scott Lee as Snead
- Guy Teague as Dirk
- Charles Evans as Jason Summerville
- George J. Lewis as Don José Figaroa
- Henry Kulky as Zeno
- George Chesebro as El Loco
- The Cass County Boys as Themselves

== Bibliography ==
- Pitts, Michael R. Western Movies: A Guide to 5,105 Feature Films. McFarland, 2012.
