= Edgar Dearing =

American actor (1893–1974)

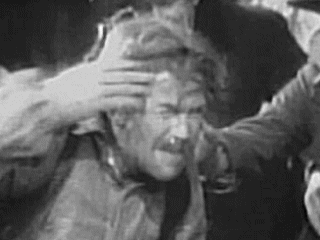
- Dearing in Abraham Lincoln (1930)
- Born: May 4, 1893; Ceres, California, U.S.
- Died: August 17, 1974 (aged 81); Woodland Hills, Los Angeles, California, U.S.
- Resting place: Chapel of the Pines Crematory in Los Angeles, California
- Occupation: Actor
- Years active: 1924–1964

Edgar Dearing (May 4, 1893 – August 17, 1974) was an American actor who became heavily type cast as a motorcycle cop in Hollywood films.

== Biography ==
Born in 1893, Dearing started in silent comedy shorts for Hal Roach, including several with Laurel and Hardy, notably in their classic Two Tars, probably his best ever screen role. He later had supporting roles in several of their features for 20th Century Fox in the 1940s.

Dearing continued in his familiar persona until the early 1950s, when he appeared in many film and television westerns, usually as a sheriff. One of his guest roles was on the syndicated television series, The Range Rider, starring Jock Mahoney and Dick Jones.

He was still active in films and television until he retired in the early 1960s.

== Death ==
He died from lung cancer.

== Selected filmography ==
- Hot Water (1924) as Motorcycle Cop (uncredited)
- The Second Hundred Years (1927) as Police Officer (uncredited)
- Should Men Walk Home? (1927) as Motorcycle Cop (uncredited)
- Why Girls Love Sailors (1927) as Amorous Sailor (uncredited)
- Playin' Hookey (1928) as Herr Dun der Blitzen
- Should Tall Men Marry? (1928) as Henchman (uncredited)
- Finders Keepers (1928) as Sergeant
- Lonesome (1928) as Cop (uncredited)
- Two Tars (1928) as Motorcycle Policeman
- The Jazz Age (1929) as Motor Cop
- Big Money (1930) as Detective (uncredited)
- Two Plus Fours (1930) as Rent Collector
- Consolation Marriage (1931) as Policeman Mulligan (uncredited)
- Horse Feathers (1932) as Speakeasy Bartender (uncredited)
- The Midnight Patrol (1933) as Policeman (uncredited)
- Cleopatra (1934) as Convict
- Eskimo (1934) as Constable Balk (uncredited)
- The Rainmakers (1935) as Kelly
- Swing Time (1936) as Policeman (uncredited)
- China Passage (1937) as Bill (uncredited)
- Nancy Steele Is Missing! (1937) as Detective Flynn
- They Gave Him a Gun (1937) as Sergeant Meadowlark
- Big City (1937) as Tom Reilley
- The Awful Truth (1937) as Motor Cop (uncredited)
- When the Daltons Rode (1940) as Sheriff
- Cross-Country Romance (1940) as Ed Sweeney, Motorcycle Cop
- A-Haunting We Will Go (1942) as Officer (uncredited)
- The Big Noise (1944) as Motor Policeman (uncredited)
- Scarlet Street (1945) as Policeman (uncredited)
- Her Lucky Night (1945) as Casey
- Don't Fence Me In (1945) as Chief of Police
- The Bishop's Wife (1947) as Policeman
- The Paleface (1948) as Sheriff (uncredited)
- Samson and Delilah (1949) as Tax Collector (uncredited)
- Fancy Pants (1950) as Mr. Jones (uncredited)
- Lightning Guns (1950) as Captain Dan Saunders
- Pecos River (1951) as Henry Mahoney
- Ridin' the Outlaw Trail (1951) as Pop Willard
- Rancho Notorious (1952) as Sheriff
- It Came From Outer Space (1953) as Sam (uncredited)
- The Long, Long Trailer (1954) as Trailer Park Manager (uncredited)
- Ma and Pa Kettle at Home (1954) as Perkins (uncredited)
- The Long Wait (1954) as Foreman (uncredited)
- Her Twelve Men (1954) as Fire Chief (uncredited)
- Tarantula (1955) as Second Tramp (uncredited)
- Cha-Cha-Cha Boom! (1956) as Investor Charlie (uncredited)
- God Is My Partner (1957) as Mike Malone, Cop (uncredited)
- The Hired Gun (1957) as Sheriff Jenner (uncredited)
- Alfred Hitchcock Presents (1959) (Season 4 Episode 33: "The Dusty Drawer") as Lewis
- No Name on the Bullet (1959) as Charlie the Chess Player (uncredited)
- Pollyanna (1960) as Mr. Gorman
- Ada (1961) as Politician (uncredited)
