= Smoky Canyon =

1952 film by Fred F. Sears

- Theatrical release poster
- Directed by: Fred F. Sears
- Written by: Barry Shipman
- Produced by: Colbert Clark
- Starring: Charles Starrett; Jock Mahoney; Danni Sue Nolan; Tris Coffin; Larry Hudson
- Cinematography: Fayte M. Browne
- Edited by: Paul Borofsky
- Production company: Columbia Pictures
- Distributed by: Columbia Pictures
- Release date: January 31, 1952
- Running time: 55 minutes
- Country: United States
- Language: English

Smoky Canyon is a 1952 American Western musical film directed by Fred F. Sears and starring Charles Starrett, Jock Mahoney, Danni Sue Nolan, Tris Coffin, and Larry Hudson.

The film was released by Columbia Pictures on January 31, 1952. This was the sixtieth of 65 films in the Durango Kid series.

== Plot ==
A range war erupts between the cattlemen and the sheep men, and a masked vigilante helps to settle it.

== Cast ==
- Charles Starrett as Steve Driscoll / The Durango Kid
- Jock Mahoney as Jack Mahoney
- Danni Sue Nolan as Roberta 'Rob' Woodstock (as Dani Sue Nolan)
- Tris Coffin as Carl Buckley
- Larry Hudson as Sheriff Bogart
- Raider as Durango's Horse
- Bullet as Steve's Horse
- Smiley Burnette as Smiley Burnette
- Chris Alcaide as Lars - Henchman (uncredited)
- Dick Botiller as Cattleman (uncredited)
- Russell Custer as Townsman (uncredited)
- Chick Hannan as Townsman (uncredited)
- Leroy Johnson as Ace (uncredited)
- Guy Madison as Henchman (uncredited)
- Gerald Mohr as Narrator (voice) (uncredited)
- Boyd 'Red' Morgan as Joe - Henchman (uncredited)
- Frank O'Connor as Jim Woodstock (uncredited)
- Sandy Sanders as Spade (uncredited)
- Charles Stevens as Johnny Big Foot (uncredited)
- Forrest Taylor as Mr. Wyler (uncredited)
- Blackie Whiteford as Townsman (uncredited)
