= Jock Mahoney =

American actor (1919–1989)

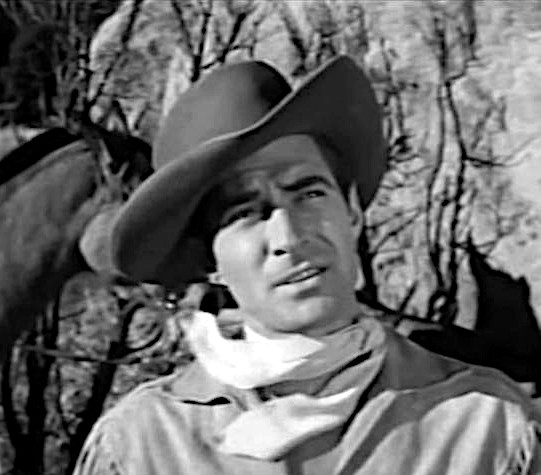
- Mahoney in The Range Rider
- Born: Jacques Joseph O'Mahoney; February 7, 1919; Chicago, Illinois, U.S.
- Died: December 14, 1989 (aged 70); Bremerton, Washington, U.S.
- Other names: Jacques O'Mahoney; Jock O'Mahoney; Jack Mahoney; Jock Mahoney
- Education: University of Iowa
- Occupations: Actor, stuntman
- Years active: 1946–1985
- Spouses: Lorraine O'Donnell (divorced) Margaret Field (m. 1952; div. 1968) Autumn Russell (m. 1969)
- Children: 3

Jacques Joseph O'Mahoney (February 7, 1919 – December 14, 1989), known professionally as Jock Mahoney, was an American actor and stuntman. He starred in two action/adventure television series, The Range Rider and Yancy Derringer. He played Tarzan in two feature films and was associated in various capacities with several other Tarzan productions. He was credited variously as Jacques O'Mahoney, Jock O'Mahoney, Jack Mahoney, and finally Jock Mahoney.

== Early life, education, and military service ==
Mahoney was born February 7, 1919, in Chicago, Illinois and reared in Davenport, Iowa. He was of French and Irish descent, the only child of Ruth and Charles O'Mahoney. He entered the University of Iowa in Iowa City and excelled at swimming and diving, but dropped out to enlist in the United States Marine Corps when World War II began. He served as a pilot and flight instructor.

== Career ==
After his discharge from the Marine Corps, Mahoney moved to Los Angeles, and for a time was a horse breeder. However, he soon became a movie stuntman, doubling for Gregory Peck, John Wayne, and Errol Flynn. For the climactic fight scene in Flynn's 1948 film Adventures of Don Juan, "Errol wanted to make a leap from midway up the staircase to the floor below," recalled director Vincent Sherman in his memoir, "but we had trouble finding a double willing to try it. Frank Pattison, our unit manager, said there was only one man in Hollywood who could do it: Jock Mahoney." Mahoney demanded and received $1,000 for the dangerous stunt. "It was a spectacular leap," wrote Sherman. "I should have shot it in slow motion to show Mahoney sailing through the air, but I didn't, and every time I see the film I want to kick myself."

Most of Mahoney's films of the late 1940s and early 1950s were produced by Columbia Pictures. Like many Columbia contract players, Mahoney worked in the studio's two-reel comedies. Beginning in 1947, writer-director Edward Bernds cast Mahoney in slapstick comedies starring the Three Stooges. Mahoney had large speaking roles in these films, and often played his scenes for laughs. Often cast alongside heroine Christine McIntyre, he appeared in the Stooge films Out West (1947), Squareheads of the Round Table (1948) (and its 1954 remake, Knutzy Knights), Fuelin' Around (1949), and Punchy Cowpunchers (1950). In the Stooge films, Mahoney—striking a heroic pose—would suddenly get clumsy, tripping over something or taking sprawling pratfalls.

Beginning in 1950, Columbia management noticed Mahoney's acting skills and gave him starring roles in two adventure serials, Cody of the Pony Express (1950) and Roar of the Iron Horse (1951). Mahoney succeeded stuntman Ted Mapes as the double for Charles Starrett in Columbia's The Durango Kid Western series. Starrett recalled that everyone called the young stuntman "Jocko": "I certainly had the best stuntmen. Jocko was just beautiful. Like a cat."

The Durango Kid wore a mask covering much of his face, enabling Mahoney to replace Starrett in the action scenes. Mahoney's daring stunts made it seem that the older Starrett grew, the more athletic he became. Mahoney contributed so much to this series that he was awarded featured billing and major supporting roles as well, first as villains and then as sympathetic characters. By 1952 Columbia was billing him as "Jack Mahoney".

When Charles Starrett's contract ran out in the spring of 1952, Columbia decided to replace him with Mahoney, opposite Starrett's sidekick Smiley Burnette. The first film was completed but never released; Columbia abandoned the series in June 1952, bringing an end to its long history of B-Western production.

== TV star ==
Cowboy star Gene Autry, then working at Columbia, hired Mahoney to star in a television series. Autry's Flying A Productions filmed 79 half-hour episodes of the syndicated The Range Rider from 1951 to 1953. In 1959, a lost episode was shown six years after the series ended. He was billed as Jack Mahoney. The character had no name other than Range Rider. His series co-star was Dick Jones, playing the role of Dick West.

In the 1958 Western film Money, Women and Guns, Mahoney played the starring role. The film also starred Kim Hunter.

For the 1958 television season, he starred in the outdoor-adventure series Yancy Derringer for 34 episodes, which aired on CBS. Yancy Derringer was a gentleman adventurer living in New Orleans, Louisiana, after the American Civil War. He had a Pawnee companion named Pahoo Katchewa ("Wolf Who Stands in Water"), played by actor X Brands. In his role as Pahoo, he did not speak and used only sign language to communicate. Pahoo had saved Derringer's life, and therefore, due to his convictions, became responsible for Derringer.

In all, he starred in 64 feature films.

== Tarzan ==
In 1948, Mahoney auditioned to play Tarzan after the departure of Johnny Weissmuller, but the role went to Lex Barker.

In 1960, he appeared as Coy Banton, a villain, in Tarzan the Magnificent, starring Gordon Scott. Mahoney's strong presence, work ethic, and lean (6 foot, 4 inch, 220 pounds) frame impressed producer Sy Weintraub, who wanted a "new look" for the fabled apeman.

In 1962, Mahoney became the 13th actor to portray Tarzan when he appeared in Tarzan Goes to India, shot on location in India. A year later, he again played the role in Tarzan's Three Challenges, shot in Thailand. When this film was released, Mahoney, at 44, became the oldest actor to play the jungle king, surpassing Weissmuller and P. Dempsey Tabler, a record that still stands. Dysentery and dengue fever plagued Mahoney during the shoot in the Thai jungles, and his weight plummeted to 175 pounds. He needed a year and a half to regain his health. Owing to his health problems and the fact that producer Weintraub had decided to go for a "younger look" for the apeman, his contract was mutually dissolved.

Mahoney made three appearances on the Ron Ely Tarzan series--The Ultimate Weapon (1966), The Deadly Silence (1966) (a two-part episode, later edited into a feature film), and Mask of Rona (1967).

In 1981, Mahoney returned to the Tarzan film series as the stunt coordinator on the John Derek-directed remake of Tarzan, the Ape Man. He was billed as "Jack O'Mahoney".

== Television guest roles ==
Mahoney was cast as an engineer, Andy Prentiss, in the 1954 episode, "Husband Pro-Tem," on the syndicated anthology series, Death Valley Days, hosted by Stanley Andrews. In the storyline, Prentis is hired by a railroad executive, Alonzo Phelps (Howard Negley) (1898–1983) to negotiate a private agreement with the Indian Chief Black Hawk (Lane Bradford) so that a railroad can be constructed across Indian lands. In his assignment, Prentis soon romantically tangles with Phelps' daughter, Evelyn (Gloria Marshall). In February 1953, Mahoney co-starred with his wife Margaret Field in the Death Valley Days episode "Swamper Ike".

In 1960, Mahoney guest-starred in the Rawhide episode "Incident of the Sharpshooter". He also appeared in television guest-starring roles on such series as Batman, the Ron Ely Tarzan series, Hawaii Five-O, Laramie, and The Streets of San Francisco. In 1973, he suffered a stroke at age 54 while filming an episode of Kung Fu.

== Later career and death ==
In the 1980s, Mahoney made guest appearances on the television series B. J. and the Bear and The Fall Guy. During the final years of his life, he was a popular guest at film conventions and autograph shows. Mahoney died of a second stroke at age 70 on December 14, 1989, two days after being involved in an automobile accident in Bremerton, Washington. His ashes were scattered into the Pacific Ocean.

== Personal life ==
Mahoney was married three times, with three children and five stepchildren. His first wife was Lorraine O'Donnell, with whom he had two children, Kathleen O'Mahoney and Jim O'Mahoney, before their divorce. He next married actress Margaret Field in 1952. Their daughter, Princess O'Mahoney, was born six months later. Margaret Field already had two young children, Richard D. Field and Sally Field, from her first marriage. Mahoney and Field divorced in June 1968. In her 2018 memoir, In Pieces, Sally Field wrote that Mahoney subjected her to sexual abuse throughout her childhood, up to the age of 14.

Mahoney's daughter, Princess O'Mahoney, later became a television and film assistant director.

== Partial filmography ==
- Son of the Guardsman (1946, Serial) – Captain Kenley (uncredited)
- The Fighting Frontiersman (1946) – Henchman Waco (uncredited)
- South of the Chisholm Trail (1947) – Henchman (uncredited)
- Over the Santa Fe Trail (1947) – Sheriff (uncredited)
- Swing the Western Way (1947) – Chief Iron Stomach (uncredited)
- The Stranger from Ponca City (1947) – Henchman Tensleep (uncredited)
- The Swordsman (1948) – Clansman Messenger (uncredited)
- Blazing Across the Pecos (1948) – Reports Indian Raid (uncredited)
- Triple Threat (1948) – Football Player (uncredited)
- Smoky Mountain Melody (1948) – Buckeye
- The Doolins of Oklahoma (1949) – Tulsa Jack Blake
- The Blazing Trail (1949) – Full-House Patterson
- Rim of the Canyon (1949) – Pete Reagan
- Jolson Sings Again (1949) – (uncredited)
- Bandits of El Dorado (1949) – Tim Starling (uncredited)
- Horsemen of the Sierras (1949) – Bill Grant
- Renegades of the Sage (1949) – Lt. Hunter
- The Nevadan (1950) – Sandy
- Cody of the Pony Express (1950, serial) – Lt. Jim Archer
- Cow Town (1950) – Tod Jeffreys
- Texas Dynamo (1950) – Bill Beck
- Hoedown (1950) – Stoney Rhodes
- David Harding, Counterspy (1950) – Brown (uncredited)
- The Kangaroo Kid (1950) – Tex Kinnane
- Frontier Outpost (1950) – Lt. Peck (uncredited)
- Lightning Guns (1950) – Sheriff Rob Saunders
- Santa Fe (1951) – Crake
- Roar of the Iron Horse – Rail-Blazer of the Apache Trail (1951, serial) – Jim Grant
- The Texas Rangers (1951) – Duke Fisher
- The Lady and the Bandit (1951) – Tavern Troublemaker (uncredited)
- Pecos River (1951) – Himself
- Smoky Canyon (1952) – Himself
- The Hawk of Wild River (1952) – Himself
- Laramie Mountains (1952) – Swift Eagle
- The Rough, Tough West (1952) – Himself
- Junction City (1952) – Himself
- The Kid from Broken Gun (1952) – Himself
- Overland Pacific (1954) – Ross Granger
- Gunfighters of the Northwest (1954, serial) – Sgt. Joe Ward
- A Day of Fury (1956) – Marshal Allan Burnett
- I've Lived Before (1956) – John Bolan / Lt. Peter Stevens
- Away All Boats (1956) – Alvick
- Showdown at Abilene (1956) – Jim Trask
- Battle Hymn (1957) – Maj. Frank Moore
- The Land Unknown (1957) – Commander Harold Roberts
- Joe Dakota (1957) – Joe Dakota
- Slim Carter (1957) – Slim Carter aka Hugh Mack
- A Time to Love and a Time to Die (1958) – Immerman
- The Last of the Fast Guns (1958) – Brad Ellison
- Money, Women and Guns (1958) – 'Silver' Ward Hogan
- Tarzan the Magnificent (1960) – Coy Banton
- Three Blondes in His Life (1961) – Duke Wallace
- Tarzan Goes to India (1962) – Tarzan
- Tarzan's Three Challenges (1963) – Tarzan
- California (1963) – Don Michael O'Casey
- The Marines Who Never Returned (1963) – Nick Rawlins
- The Walls of Hell (1964) – Lt. Jim Sorenson
- Cimarron (1964)
- Moro Witch Doctor (1964) – CIA Agent Jefferson Stark
- Runaway Girl (1965) – Randy Minola
- Once Before I Die (1966) – Major (uncredited)
- The Glory Stompers (1967) – Smiley
- Bandolero! (1968) – Stoner
- The Love Bug (1968) – Driver #21
- Portrait of Violence (1968)
- Tom (1973) – Sgt. Berry
- Their Only Chance (1975) – Grizzly Bill, Marvin Latham
- The End (1978) – Old Man

== Selected Television ==
Year	Title	Role	Notes
1953	Death Valley Days	Indian Sal, Swamper Ike and Joe	Season 1, Episode 12, "Swamper Ike"
1958	Yancy Derringer	Yancy Derringer	34 episodes
1961	Rawhide	Captain Donahoe	S3:E23, "Incident of the Phantom Bugler"

== See also ==
- List of people from Chicago
- List of people from Davenport, Iowa
- List of people from Los Angeles
- List of University of Iowa alumni

== Sources ==
- Essoe, Gabe (1968). Tarzan of The Movies – A Pictorial History of More Than Fifty Years of Edgar Rice Burroughs' Legendary Hero. New York City: Citadel Press. ISBN 978-0-806-50295-3.
- Field, Sally (2018). In Pieces. New York City: Grand Central Publishing. ISBN 978-1-5387-6302-5.
