= Terror Trail (1946 film) =

1946 film by Ray Nazarro

- Directed by: Ray Nazarro
- Written by: Ed Earl Repp
- Produced by: Colbert Clark
- Starring: Charles Starrett
- Cinematography: George Meehan
- Edited by: Aaron Stell
- Production company: Columbia Pictures
- Distributed by: Columbia Pictures
- Release date: November 21, 1946
- Running time: 57 minutes
- Country: United States
- Language: English

Terror Trail is a 1946 American Western film directed by Ray Nazarro and starring Charles Starrett. The film's sets were designed by the art director Charles Clague. It was shot at the Iverson Ranch. This was the seventeenth of 65 films in the Durango Kid series.

== Cast ==
- Charles Starrett as Steve Haverley / The Durango Kid
- Barbara Pepper as Karen Kemp - the Louisville Lady
- Ozie Waters as Ozie Waters
- Smiley Burnette as Smiley Burnette
- Lane Chandler as Duke Catlett
- George Chesebro as Henchman Drag
- Zon Murray as Bart Matson
- Colorado Rangers as Musicians

== Bibliography ==
- Gene Freese. Jock Mahoney: The Life and Films of a Hollywood Stuntman. McFarland, 2013.
