= Charles Clague =

British-born art director

- Born: 9 August 1890; Isle of Man
- Died: 15 January 1962 (aged 71); Los Angeles, California; United States
- Other name: Samuel Charles Clague
- Occupation: Art director
- Years active: 1934–1955 (film)

Charles Clague (1890–1962) was a Manx-born art director who worked in Hollywood films. He was employed by Columbia Pictures, during the 1940s and early 1950s.

== Selected filmography ==
- Phantom of Chinatown (1940)
- Farewell to Fame (1941)
- Terror Trail (1946)
- Gunning For Vengeance (1946)
- The Lone Wolf in Mexico (1947)
- Sport of Kings (1947)
- Crime on Their Hands (1948)
- Moonlight Raid (1949)
- Harmony Inn (1949)
- Trail of the Rustlers (1950)
- Mule Train (1950)
- The Hills of Utah (1951)
- Ridin' the Outlaw Trail (1951)
- The Kid from Amarillo (1951)
- Laramie Mountains (1952)
- Cripple Creek (1952)
- Junction City (1952)
- The Old West (1952)

== Bibliography ==
- Blottner, Gene. Columbia Pictures Movie Series, 1926-1955: The Harry Cohn Years. McFarland, 2011.
