= Trail of the Rustlers =

1950 film by Ray Nazarro

- Original film poster
- Directed by: Ray Nazarro
- Written by: Victor Arthur
- Produced by: Colbert Clark
- Starring: Charles Starrett; Gail Davis; Tommy Ivo
- Cinematography: Fayte M. Browne
- Edited by: Paul Borofsky
- Production company: Columbia Pictures
- Distributed by: Columbia Pictures
- Release date: February 2, 1950
- Running time: 55 minutes
- Country: United States
- Language: English

Trail of the Rustlers is a 1950 American Western film directed by Ray Nazarro and starring Charles Starrett, Gail Davis and Tommy Ivo. It is also known by the alternative title Lost River. It is the 45th of 65 films in the Durango Kid series.

The film's sets were designed by the art director Charles Clague. It was shot at the Iverson Ranch.

== Plot ==
Kindly Mrs. Mahoney is actually the mastermind behind a scheme to acquire all of the ranch land in the valley. Her sons and their henchmen use violence to force the ranchers to sell, with her son Chick impersonating the Durango Kid, who leads the attacks on the ranchers.

== Cast ==
- Charles Starrett as Steve Armitage / The Durango Kid
- Gail Davis as Mary Ellen Hyland
- Tommy Ivo as Todd Hyland
- Mira McKinney as Mrs. J.G. Mahoney
- Don C. Harvey as Chick Mahoney
- Eddie Cletro as Guitar Player
- The Roundup Boys as Musicians
- Smiley Burnette as Smiley Burnette
- Myron Healey as Ben Mahoney
- Gene Roth as Sheriff Dave Wilcox

== Bibliography ==
- Pitts, Michael R. Western Movies: A Guide to 5,105 Feature Films. McFarland, 2012.
