= Junction City (film) =

1952 film by Ray Nazarro

- Directed by: Ray Nazarro
- Written by: Barry Shipman
- Produced by: Colbert Clark
- Starring: Charles Starrett; Smiley Burnette; Jock Mahoney
- Cinematography: Henry Freulich
- Edited by: Paul Borofsky
- Music by: Mischa Bakaleinikoff
- Production company: Columbia Pictures
- Distributed by: Columbia Pictures
- Release date: July 12, 1952
- Running time: 54 minutes
- Country: United States
- Language: English

Junction City is a 1952 American Western film directed by Ray Nazarro and starring Charles Starrett, Smiley Burnette and Jock Mahoney. It is the penultimate film in the Durango Kid series.

== Cast ==
- Charles Starrett as Steve Rollins / Durango Kid
- Smiley Burnette as Smiley
- Jock Mahoney as Jack Mahoney
- Kathleen Case as Penny Clinton
- John Dehner as Emmett Sanderson
- Steve Darrell as Black Murphy
- George Chesebro as Sheriff Jeff Clinton
- Anita Castle as Penelope Clinton
- Mary Newton as Ella Sanderson
- Robert Bice as Bleaker
- Hal Price as Sheriff
- Hal Taliaferro as Sandy Clinton
- Chris Alcaide as Jarvis
- Bob Woodward as Keely
- Frank Ellis as Henchman

== Bibliography ==
- Gene Freese. Jock Mahoney: The Life and Films of a Hollywood Stuntman. McFarland, 2013.
