= Pecos River (film) =

1951 film by Fred F. Sears

- Directed by: Fred F. Sears
- Written by: Barry Shipman
- Produced by: Colbert Clark
- Starring: Charles Starrett; Jock Mahoney; Anne James
- Cinematography: Fayte M. Browne
- Edited by: Paul Borofsky
- Production company: Columbia Pictures
- Distributed by: Columbia Pictures
- Release date: December 15, 1951
- Running time: 55 minutes
- Country: United States
- Language: English

Pecos River is a 1951 American Western film directed by Fred F. Sears and starring Charles Starrett, Jock Mahoney and Anne James, the 59th of 65 films in the Durango Kid series.

== Cast ==
- Charles Starrett as Steve Baldwin / The Durango Kid
- Jock Mahoney as Jack Mahoney
- Anne James as Betty Coulter
- Steve Darrell as Pop Rockland
- Edgar Dearing as Henry Mahoney
- Frank Jenks as Sheriff Denning
- Harmonica Bill as Harmonica Player Bill
- Smiley Burnette as Smiley Burnette

== Bibliography ==
- Pitts, Michael R. Western Movies: A Guide to 5,105 Feature Films. McFarland, 2012.
