= The Old West (film) =

1952 film by George Archainbaud

- Directed by: George Archainbaud
- Written by: Gerald Geraghty
- Produced by: Armand Schaefer
- Starring: Gene Autry
- Cinematography: William Bradford
- Edited by: James Sweeney
- Production company: Gene Autry Productions
- Distributed by: Columbia Pictures
- Release date: January 15, 1952
- Running time: 61 minutes
- Country: United States
- Language: English

The Old West is a 1952 American Western film directed by George Archainbaud and starring Gene Autry. The film's sets were designed by the art director Charles Clague.

== Plot ==
Doc Lockwood and his gang are trying to take away Gene Autry's contract for supplying horses to the stagecoach line.

== Cast ==
- Gene Autry as Gene Autry
- Gail Davis as Arlie Williams
- Lyle Talbot as Doc Lockwood
- Louis Jean Heydt as Jeff Bleeker
- House Peters as Parson Jonathan Brooks
- House Peters Jr. as Henchman Mike
- Dickie Jones as Pinto
- Kathy Johnson as Judie Bleeker
- Pat Buttram as Panhandle Gibbs
- Gertrude Astor as Townswoman
- Buddy Roosevelt as Cowboy

== Bibliography ==
- Pitts, Michael R. Western Movies: A Guide to 5,105 Feature Films. McFarland, 2012.
