= The Big Gusher =

1951 film directed by Lew Landers

- Film poster
- Directed by: Lew Landers
- Screenplay by: Daniel B. Ullman (as Danirl Ullman)
- Story by: Harold Greene (as Harold R. Greene)
- Produced by: Wallace MacDonald
- Starring: Wayne Morris; Preston Foster
- Cinematography: William P. Whitley
- Edited by: Aaron Stell
- Production company: Columbia Pictures
- Distributed by: Columbia Pictures
- Release date: July 1, 1951
- Running time: 68 minutes
- Country: United States
- Language: English

The Big Gusher is a 1951 American adventure film directed by Lew Landers and starring Wayne Morris and Preston Foster. Its plot involves a pair oil prospectors on a drunken spree who buy an apparently worthless piece of land from a con man and then attempt to discover whether it contains oil.

== Cast ==
- Wayne Morris as Kenny Blake
- Preston Foster as Henry 'Hank' Mason
- Dorothy Patrick as Betsy Abbott
- Paul E. Burns as Cappy Groves
- Emmett Vogan as Jim Tolman

== Bibliography ==
- Dick, Bernard F. Columbia Pictures: Portrait of a Studio. University Press of Kentucky, 2015.
