= Laramie Mountains (film) =

1952 film by Ray Nazarro

- Directed by: Ray Nazarro
- Written by: Barry Shipman
- Produced by: Colbert Clark
- Starring: Charles Starrett; Jock Mahoney; Fred F. Sears
- Cinematography: Fayte M. Browne; Rex Wimpy
- Edited by: Paul Borofsky
- Production company: Columbia Pictures
- Distributed by: Columbia Pictures
- Release date: April 20, 1952
- Running time: 54 minutes
- Country: United States
- Language: English

Laramie Mountains is a 1952 American Western film directed by Ray Nazarro and starring Charles Starrett, Jock Mahoney and Fred F. Sears. The film is the 62nd of 65 in the Durango Kid series. The film's sets were designed by the art director Charles Clague.

== Plot ==
Drake and his accomplice, with a hidden agenda to generate conflict between the army and native Indians, come across an unconscious soldier, and take him to back to Fort Tourney, considering this as an opportunity to generate goodwill in the army. Their plans are foiled by Steve/The Durango Kid, who exposes the plan being hatched by their boss to get hold of gold found in the region's caves once the native Indians are removed by the army. Helping Steve in his adventure is Swift Eagle, who had grown up as a boy with the native Indians after his father was killed.

== Cast ==
- Charles Starrett as Steve Holden/The Durango Kid
- Jock Mahoney as Swift Eagle
- Fred F. Sears as Major Markham
- Marshall Reed as Lieutenant Robert Pierce
- Rory Mallinson as Paul Drake
- Zon Murray as Carson
- Smiley Burnette as Sergeant Smiley Burnette
- Chris Alcaide as Jeff
- Frank McCarroll as Soldier
- Boyd 'Red' Morgan as Cruller
- Charles Soldani as Indian with Swift Eagle
- Boyd Stockman as Corporal
- John War Eagle as Chief Lone Tree
- Robert J. Wilke as Henry Mandel

== Bibliography ==
- Pitts, Michael R. Western Movies: A Guide to 5,105 Feature Films. McFarland, 2012.
