= Rex Wimpy =

American cinematographer

- Born: December 18, 1899; Jonesboro, Indiana, U.S.
- Died: December 29, 1972 (aged 73); Los Angeles County, California, U.S.
- Occupations: Special effects artist, cinematographer
- Years active: 1929–1967

Rex Wimpy (December 18, 1899 – December 29, 1972) was an American special effects artist and cinematographer. He was nominated for an Oscar for Best Special Effects for the film Air Force.

== Selected filmography ==
- Stairs of Sand (1929)
- Pointed Heels (1929)
- Talent Scout (1937)
- Air Force (1943)
- Challenge of the Range (1949)
- Laramie (1949)
- Laramie Mountains (1952)
