= Barry Shipman =

Canadian-American screenwriter

- Born: February 24, 1912; Pasadena, California, United States
- Died: August 12, 1994 (aged 82); San Bernardino, California; United States
- Occupation: Writer
- Years active: 1936–1966
- Spouse: Gwynne Shipman
- Children: Nina Shipman
- Parent(s): Ernest Shipman; Nell Shipman

Barry Shipman (February 24, 1912 – August 12, 1994) was a Canadian-American screenwriter.

A native of South Pasadena, Shipman was the son of the Canadian film pioneers Ernest Shipman and Nell Shipman. He was educated at a military school in Santa Monica.

Shipman was employed by Republic and Columbia studios for 45 years, writing scripts for films and serials. He worked on more than a hundred films and television series, mainly of the western and mystery film genres.

In 1966 Shipman began working at Norton Air Force Base, making documentaries and training films for the United States Air Force.

He was married to the actress Gwynne Shipman, with whom he had a daughter Nina Shipman who also became an actress.

Shipman died in San Bernardino of prostate cancer at the age of 82.

== Selected filmography ==
- Shakedown (1936)
- Hi-Yo Silver (1940)
- Roaring Rangers (1946)
- Singin' Spurs (1948)
- Song of Idaho (1948)
- Laramie (1949)
- The Blazing Trail (1949)
- Horsemen of the Sierras (1949)
- The Kid from Amarillo (1951)
- Bonanza Town (1951)
- Pecos River (1951)
- Montana Territory (1952)
- Laramie Mountains (1952)
- Smoky Canyon (1952)
- Junction City (1952)
- Lay That Rifle Down (1955)
- Stranger at My Door (1956)

== Bibliography ==
- Morris, Peter. Embattled Shadows: A History of Canadian Cinema, 1895-1939. McGill-Queen's Press, 1992.
