= Colbert Clark =

American film director (1898–1960)

- Born: August 31, 1898; Galesburg, Illinois, US
- Died: May 4, 1960 (aged 61); Coronado, California, US
- Occupations: Producer, Writer, Director
- Years active: 1927–1957 (film)

Colbert Clark (August 31, 1898 – May 4, 1960) was an American screenwriter, film director and film producer. He particularly specialized in making western films.

As a producer at Columbia Pictures, Clark was responsible for resuming production of Durango Kid films in 1945, with The Return of the Durango Kid being the first of 64 movies about the character produced from 1945 through 1952.

== Selected filmography ==
- The Wolf Dog (1933)
- The Three Musketeers (1933)
- The Marines Are Coming (1934)
- Waterfront Lady (1935)
- The Wrong Road (1937)
- West Point Widow (1941)
- Atlantic Convoy (1942)
- The Boy from Stalingrad (1943)
- She Has What It Takes (1943)
- Terror Trail (1946)
- Gunning for Vengeance (1946)
- Galloping Thunder (1946)
- The Lone Hand Texan (1947)
- Song of Idaho (1948)
- Horsemen of the Sierras (1949)
- Laramie (1949)
- The Blazing Trail (1949)
- Trail of the Rustlers (1950)
- Lightning Guns (1950)
- Bonanza Town (1951)
- The Kid from Amarillo (1951)
- Pecos River (1951)
- Ridin' the Outlaw Trail (1951)
- Laramie Mountains (1952)
- Smoky Canyon (1952)
- Junction City (1952)

== Bibliography ==
- Tuska, Jon. The Vanishing Legion: A History of Mascot Pictures, 1927-1935. McFarland, 1999.
