= The Woodpecker Song =

Song performed by Glenn Miller

- 1940 sheet music cover featuring Glenn Miller

Song by Glenn Miller & His Orchestra
- B-side: "Let's All Sing Together"
- Released: February 9, 1940
- Genre: Swing; Big Band
- Length: 2:33
- Label: Bluebird
- Songwriters: Eldo Di Lazzaro; Harold Adamson

Glenn Miller & His Orchestra singles chronology
| "Starlit Hour" (1940) | "The Woodpecker Song" (1940) | "The Sky Fell Down" (1940) |

1940 RCA Bluebird 78 single release by Glenn Miller and His Orchestra, B-10598-A.

"The Woodpecker Song" is a 1940 hit separately recorded by Glenn Miller & His Orchestra, The Andrews Sisters, and Kate Smith. It is the cover of a 1939 Italian folk song, "Reginella campagnola" ("Queen of the Countryside"), with music by Eldo Di Lazzaro and lyrics by Bruno Cherubini (pseudonym "C. Bruno"). The English lyrics were written by Harold Adamson.

The Glenn Miller recording on RCA Bluebird featuring Marion Hutton on vocals reached No. 1 on the Your Hit Parade chart in 1940 where it topped the charts for seven weeks.

== Recorded versions ==
- Glenn Miller & His Orchestra. Vocalist: Marion Hutton. Recorded on January 29, 1940. Released on a 78 rpm A side single record by Bluebird Records as catalog number 10598 backed with "Let's All Sing Together". It "ranked third in jukeboxes in 1940."
- The Andrews Sisters. Recorded on February 21, 1940. Released on a 78 rpm record by Decca Records as catalog number 3065A.
- Kate Smith with Jack Miller Orchestra. Recorded on February 25, 1940. Released on a 78 rpm record by Columbia Records as catalog number 35398.
- Sophia Vembo recorded a satirical version of the original Italian folk song, "Reginella campagnola", called "Κορόιδο Μουσολίνι" ("Mussolini you fool"); the song became the unofficial second National Anthem of Greece during the Greco-Italian War of 1940 and later during the Axis Occupation of Greece. It is still sung by Greeks all over the world and is taught in schools.
- Josephine Siao. Recorded in Cantonese under the title of "Swallow Flying in Pair" (燕雙飛, Jin^{3} Soeng^{1}Fei^{1}) in 1967 and released by Fung Hang Record of Hong Kong under catalog number FHEP400 as one of the theme songs of the Cantonese movie You Are My Love.

== On film ==
- Chico Marx performs a piano arrangement of the song in the Marx Brothers film, Go West (MGM, 1940)
- Gene Autry and Mary Lee - "The Woodpecker Song" from Ride, Tenderfoot, Ride (Republic Pictures, 1940)
