= Herbert Clifton =

American actor and entertainer (1885–1947)

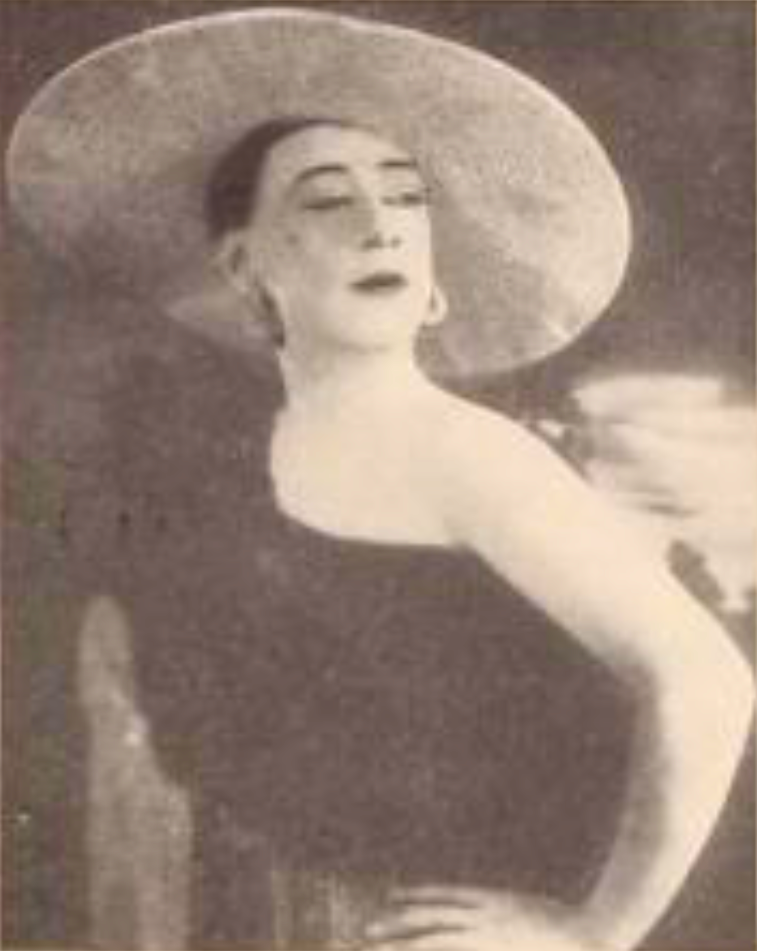
- Herbert Clifton in 1927
- Born: Herbert William Clifton; October 19, 1885; Greenwich, London, England
- Died: September 26, 1947 (aged 61); Hollywood, Los Angeles, U.S.
- Occupation(s): Vaudeville entertainer, actor
- Years active: c. 1900–1947

Herbert William Clifton (19 October 1885 – 26 September 1947) was an English-born American actor and entertainer, who for much of his career performed as a female impersonator.

== Life and career ==
He was born in Greenwich, London, and at the age of 15 was described in the 1901 UK census as an "operatic singer". He appeared in music halls, and married Hilda Light in 1908. She became his piano accompanist, wrote his musical repertoire, and played while he changed his costume. As a female impersonator, he was described as "unique in his field in being straight, married and somewhat plump".

He first performed in the United States in 1910, appearing at the Alhambra Theatre in New York City. He sang in a male soprano voice, firstly in the guise of a street urchin before changing into the dress of a chorus girl, and finally as a burlesque dancer. He was immediately successful, and featured in the 1914 Ziegfeld Follies. He and his wife settled in the United States, becoming naturalized citizens in 1916.

He performed widely through the 1920s, presenting shows entitled Woman's Fads and Follies, and Travesties of the Weaker Sex. A reviewer in Variety wrote in 1920: "This man is a strange mixture. He has the voices of a feminine impersonator and of a longshoreman. He burlesques and he satirizes broadly, yet he wears gowns that are a challenge not only to Julian Eltinge but to Valeska Suratt; at times his work is serious and rises to art. At other times it is low, though never low-down."

Following the decline of vaudeville in the early 1930s, Clifton changed approach and became an orthodox character actor in male roles, often playing bit parts such as a butler or chauffeur. His film debut was in the comedy Her First Mate in 1933. His later films included High Flyers (1937), Ride, Tenderfoot, Ride (1940), Dr. Jekyll and Mr. Hyde (1941), and his final film, Ivy (1947).

He died at the age of 61 in Hollywood, Los Angeles, following an operation.
