= Sis Hopkins (1941 film) =

1941 film by Joseph Santley

- Directed by: Joseph Santley
- Screenplay by: Jack Townley; Milt Gross; Edward Eliscu
- Story by: F. McGrew Willis
- Produced by: Robert North
- Starring: Judy Canova; Bob Crosby; Charles Butterworth; Jerry Colonna; Susan Hayward; Katharine Alexander
- Cinematography: Jack A. Marta
- Edited by: Ernest J. Nims
- Music by: Mort Glickman; Walter Scharf
- Production company: Republic Pictures
- Distributed by: Republic Pictures
- Release date: April 12, 1941
- Running time: 99 minutes
- Country: United States
- Language: English

Sis Hopkins is a 1941 American comedy film directed by Joseph Santley and starring Judy Canova, Bob Crosby, Charles Butterworth, Jerry Colonna and Susan Hayward. It was produced and distributed by Republic Pictures, who made a number Canova films, and was released on April 12, 1941. Sis Hopkins was nominated for an Academy Award for Black-and-White Art Direction but that nomination was withdrawn by Republic Studios.

== Plot ==
Sis Hopkins, an uncouth girl from the country, goes to live with her wealthy, self-made uncle and his snobbish wife and daughter. At first she finds everyone makes fun of her unsophisticated ways but gradually manages to win people over.

== Cast ==
- Judy Canova as Sis Hopkins
- Bob Crosby as Jeff Farnsworth
- Charles Butterworth as Horace Hopkins
- Jerry Colonna as Professor
- Susan Hayward as Carol Hopkins
- Katharine Alexander as Clara Hopkins
- Elvia Allman as Ripple
- Carol Adams as Cynthia
- Lynn Merrick as Phyllis
- Mary Ainslee as Vera De Vere
- Charles Coleman as Butler
- Andrew Tombes as Mayor
- Charles Lane as Rollo
- Byron Foulger as Joe
- Betty Blythe as Mrs. Farnsworth
- Frank Darien as Jud
- Adrian Morris as Bodyguard

== Bibliography ==
- Fetrow, Alan G. Feature Films, 1940-1949: a United States Filmography. McFarland, 1994.
