= Edward Norris =

American actor (1911–2002)

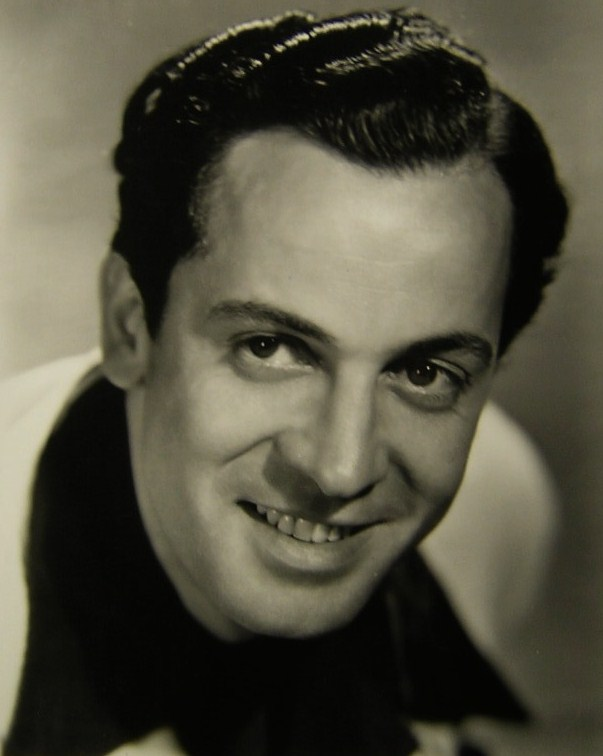
- Norris in 1939
- Born: Septimus Edward Norris; March 10, 1911; Philadelphia, Pennsylvania, U.S.
- Died: December 18, 2002 (aged 91); Fort Bragg, California, U.S.
- Occupation: Actor
- Years active: 1933–1963
- Spouses: Virginia Bell Hiller (m. 1927; div. 1932) Lona Andre (m. 1935; annul. 1935) Ann Sheridan (m. 1936; div. 1938) Mickey June Satterlee (m. 1942; div. 1943) Sheila Ryan ()
- Children: 1

Septimus Edward Norris (March 10, 1911 – December 18, 2002) was an American film actor.

== Early years ==
Norris was born in 1911, the son of a prominent Philadelphia gynecologist, who was described in a newspaper article as "a famous surgeon and chief of staff at the city's largest hospital." He grew up in Philadelphia, Pennsylvania. At age 16, he dropped out of the Culver Military Academy to marry a socially prominent physician's daughter, Virginia Bell Hiller, and took a job as a reporter.

== Film ==
Norris performed in over 70 films during his 20+ year career in Hollywood, including appearing with Lana Turner in her debut film role in They Won't Forget, a film that was based on the Leo Frank case, where Norris starred as the character analogous to Frank. See full filmography below.

== Television ==
Norris made his television debut in 1951 with two appearances on Fireside Theater.

During the course of his 12-year span on television he made two guest appearances on Perry Mason: "The Case of the Fiery Fingers" (1958) and "The Case of the Tarnished Trademark" (1962). He ended his film and television career the following year when he appeared on an episode of The Third Man, titled "Ghost Town".

== Military service ==
Norris was a flying instructor in the United States Army Air Forces during World War II.

== Personal life ==
After Hiller, Norris was married to actresses Ann Sheridan and Lona Andre. On July 21, 1942, newspaper columnist Harrison Carroll reported that Norris "eloped to Arizona Saturday with a new Hollywood beauty who gave her name as Jane Doe." Another newspaper report said, "An affidavit on file testified that the girl's correct name was Jane Doe." The bride's real name was revealed by columnist Jimmie Fidler on July 30, 1942: "The girl Edward Norris married and introduced to reporters as 'Jane Doe' is June Satterlee, ex-night club hatcheck looker. She's to make a picture to be titled Meet Jane Doe." In March 1943, Norris was granted a divorce from Satterlee "after testifying that she married him solely to further her career in pictures." Mickey June Satterlee was the older sister of Peggy Larue Satterlee, known for accusing Errol Flynn of statutory rape, the incident occurring when Peggy was 15 in August 1941. Both sisters were aspiring actresses. Flynn was acquitted of rape in February 1943. Later, he and actress Sheila Ryan married, but they had problems in 1948. They had divorced by 1950 when Ryan married actor Pat Buttram to whom she remained married until her own death.

Norris was an avid shooter and "won many ribbons and trophies in skeet matches throughout the country." He was also a licensed pilot.

== Death ==
Norris died on December 18, 2002, at Fort Bragg, California.

== Filmography ==
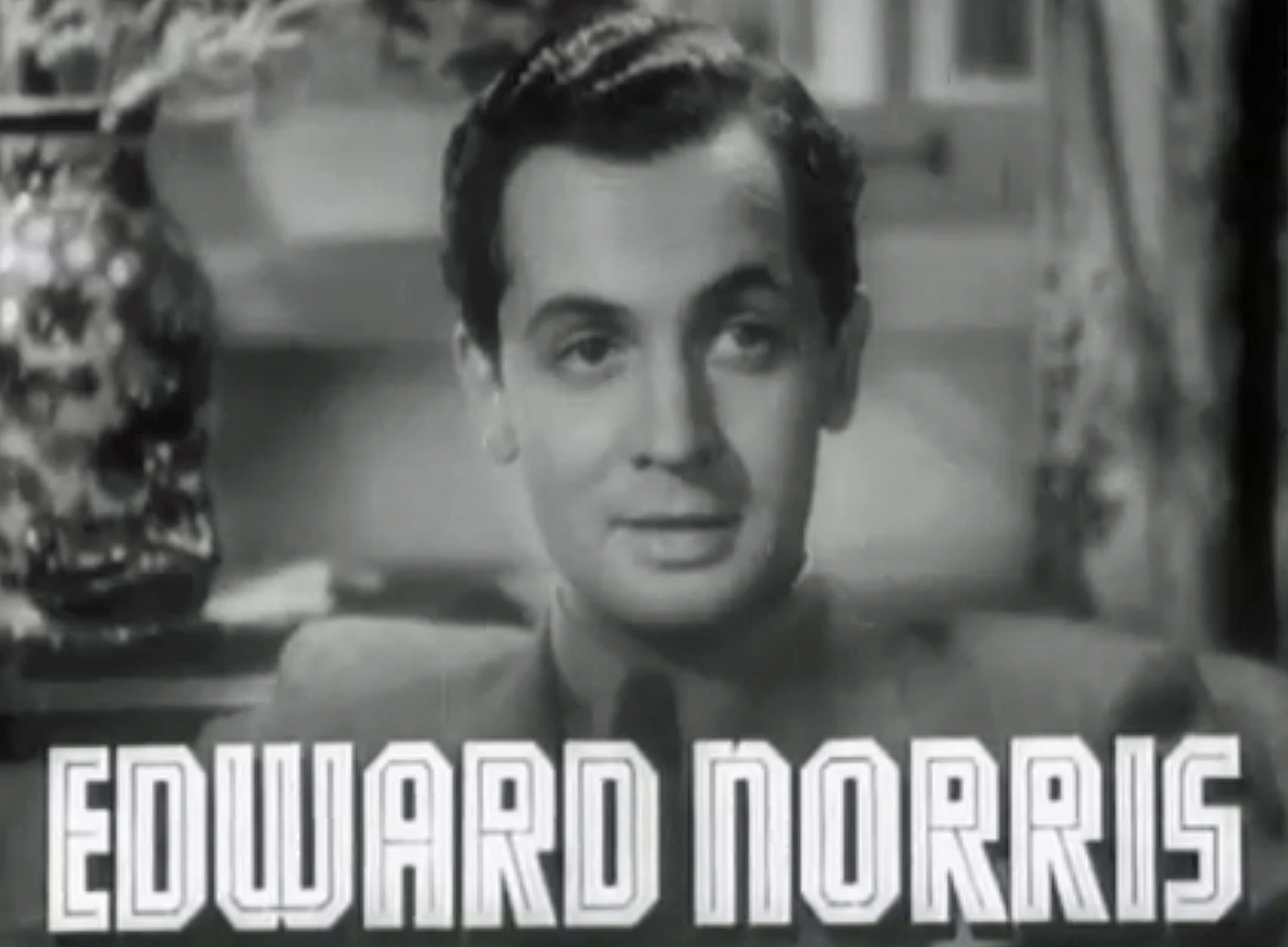
Edward Norris in trailer for "They Won't Forget" (1937)

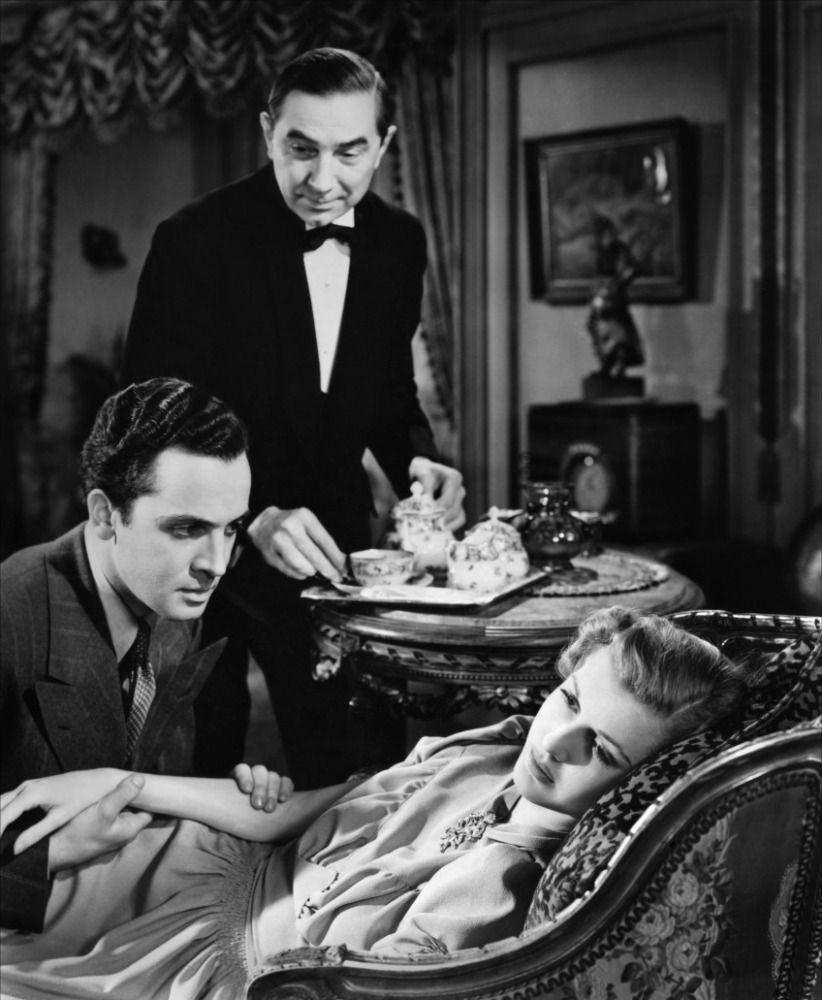
Bela Lugosi (in back) Edward Norris, and Anita Louise in The Gorilla (1939)

Film
Year	Title	Role	Notes
1933	Queen Christina	Count Jacob	Uncredited
1934	This Side of Heaven	Clarke - Upper Classman	Uncredited
1934	Coming Out Party	Party Guest	Uncredited
1934	Paris Interlude	Reporter	Uncredited
1935	One New York Night	Tom	Uncredited
1935	Naughty Marietta	Suitor	Uncredited
1935	Wagon Trail	Clay Hartley, Jr.	
1935	Teacher's Beau	Ralph Wilson	Short
1935	Murder in the Fleet	Sleepy	Uncredited
1935	Mad Love	Man Outside Theater of Horrors	Uncredited
1935	Woman Wanted	Man on Phone at Party	Uncredited
1935	Show Them No Mercy!	Joe Martin	
1936	Tough Guy	Bud	Uncredited
1936	Small Town Girl	Harvard Man in Car	Uncredited
1936	The Magnificent Brute	Hal Howard	
1937	Mama Steps Out	Ferdie Fisher - the Bandleader	
1937	Song of the City	Guido Romandi	
1937	Between Two Women	Dr. Barili	
1937	They Won't Forget	Robert Perry Hale	
1937	Bad Guy	Steve Carrol	
1938	Boys Town	Joe Marsh	
1938	Newsboys' Home	Frankie Barber	
1939	Tail Spin	Speed Allen	
1939	On Trial	Arbuckle	
1939	The Gorilla	Jack Marsden	
1939	Frontier Marshal	Dan Blackmore	
1939	Here I Am a Stranger	Lester Bennet	
1939	The Escape	Louie Peronni	
1939	Scandal Sheet	Petty Haynes	
1940	Dr. Ehrlich's Magic Bullet	Dr. Morgenroth	
1940	Ski Patrol	Paavo Luuki	
1940	The Lady in Question	Robert LaCoste	
1941	Road Show	Ed Newton	
1941	Back in the Saddle	Tom Bennett	
1941	Here Comes Happiness	Chet Madden	
1941	Angels with Broken Wings	Steve Wilson	
1941	Doctors Don't Tell	Dr. Frank Blake	
1942	The Lady Has Plans	Frank Richards	
1942	A Close Call for Ellery Queen	Stewart Cole	
1942	The Man with Two Lives	Philip Bennett	
1942	The Mystery of Marie Roget	Marcel Vigneaux	
1942	I Live on Danger	Eddie Nelson	
1942	Sabotage Squad	Eddie Miller	
1942	The Great Impersonation	Captain Francois Bardinet	
1942	Mug Town	Clinker	
1943	You Can't Beat the Law	Johnny Gray	
1943	No Place for a Lady	Mario	
1943	Wings Over the Pacific	Lt. Allan Scott, USN	
1943	The Sultan's Daughter	Jimmy	
1944	Sing a Jingle	Abbott	
1944	Career Girl	Steve Dexter	
1944	Men on Her Mind	Jeffrey Wingate	
1944	Shadows in the Night	Jess Hilton	
1944	The Singing Sheriff	Vance	
1944	End of the Road	Robert Kirby	
1945	Night Club Girl	Clark Phillips	
1945	Jungle Queen	Bob Elliot	Serial
1945	Penthouse Rhythm	Charles Henry Holmes Jr.	
1946	Murder in the Music Hall	Carl Lang	
1946	The Truth About Murder	William Ames Crane	
1946	Decoy	Jim Vincent	
1947	Heartaches	Jimmy McDonald, Evening Telegram Reporter	
1948	Trapped by Boston Blackie	Igor Borio	
1949	Forgotten Women	Andy Emerson	
1949	The Mysterious Desperado	Ramon Bustamante	
1949	The Wolf Hunters	Paul Lautrec	
1950	Killer Shark	Ramon - crewman	
1950	Surrender	Wilbur	
1950	Breakthrough	Sgt. Roy Henderson	
1950	The Blazing Sun	Doc Larry Taylor	
1950	Highway 301	Noyes Hinton	
1951	I Was a Communist for the FBI	Harmon	
1951	Inside the Walls of Folsom Prison	Sgt. Cliff Hart	
1953	Murder Without Tears	Warren Richards	
1953	The Man from the Alamo	Mapes	
1956	The Kentuckian	Roulette Dealer	
