= Melody Ranch =

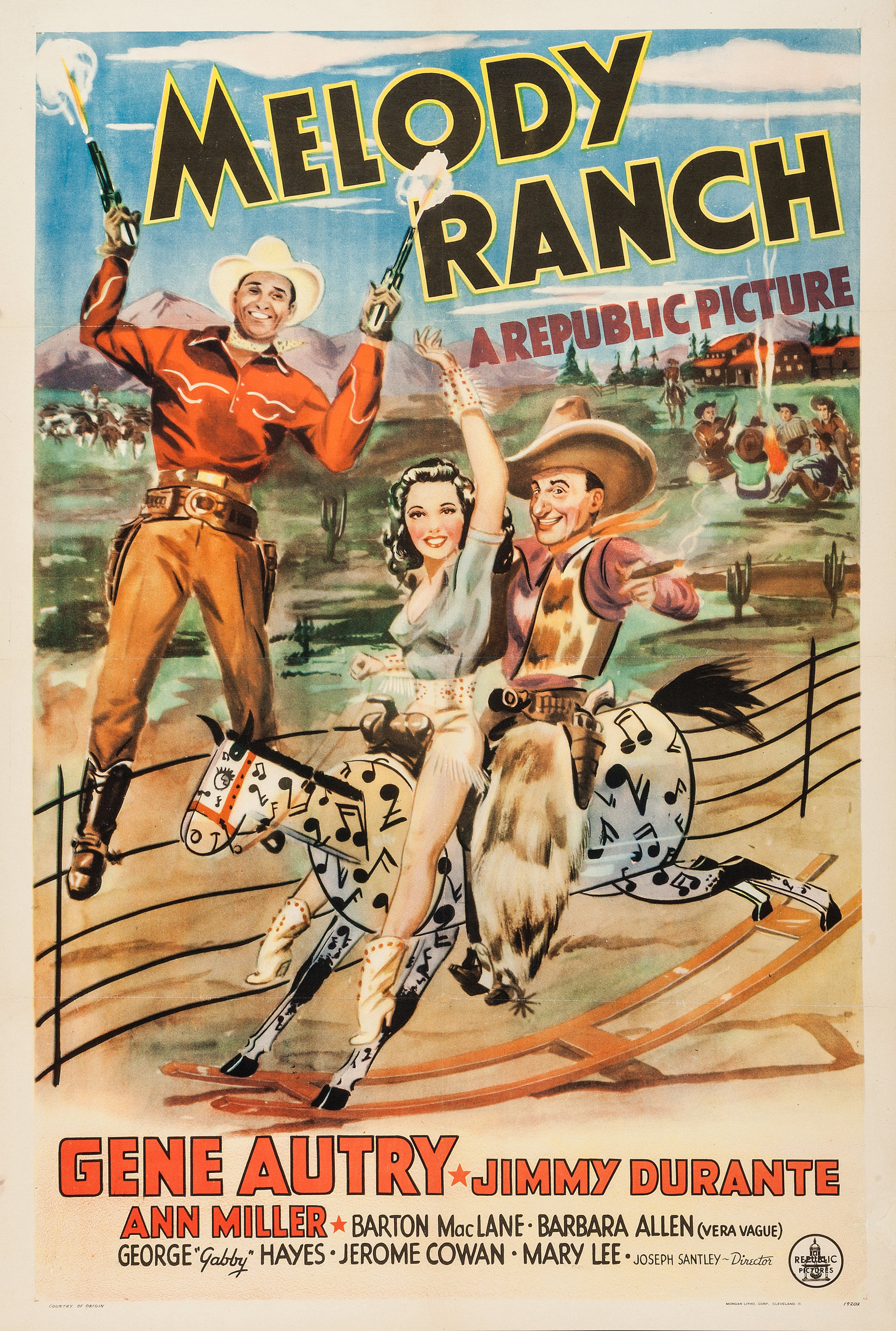
- Theatrical release poster
- Directed by: Joseph Santley
- Screenplay by: Jack Moffitt; F. Hugh Herbert; Bradford Ropes; Betty Burbridge
- Produced by: Sol C. Siegel
- Starring: Gene Autry; Jimmy Durante; Ann Miller
- Cinematography: Joseph H. August
- Edited by: Lester Orlebeck
- Music by: Raoul Kraushaar (supervisor)
- Production company: Republic Pictures
- Distributed by: Republic Pictures
- Release date: November 15, 1940 (U.S.)
- Running time: 84 minutes
- Country: United States
- Language: English
- Budget: $181.275

Melody Ranch is a 1940 Western musical film directed by Joseph Santley and starring Gene Autry, Jimmy Durante, and Ann Miller. Written by Jack Moffitt, F. Hugh Herbert, Bradford Ropes, and Betty Burbridge, the film is about a singing cowboy who returns to his hometown to restore order when his former childhood enemies take over the frontier town. In 2002, the film was selected for preservation in the National Film Registry by the National Film Preservation Board and being deemed "culturally, historically, or aesthetically significant."

== Plot ==
Gene Autry returns to his hometown of Torpedo as guest of honor at the Frontier Days Celebration, where he meets his childhood enemies, the Wildhack brothers—Mark, Jasper, and Bud—who are now local gangsters. The Wildhacks own a saloon next door to the school, and when their shooting and brawling endangers the safety of the children, Gene protests and threatens to expose them during his next radio broadcast. The Wildhacks stop the broadcast and beat Gene up.

Realizing that Hollywood life has softened him to the extent that he cannot hold his own against three assailants, Gene decides to remain in Torpedo and get into shape again. He is encouraged by his friend Cornelius J. "Corney" Courtney and Pop Laramie. Refusing to return to Hollywood, Gene now broadcasts his radio shows from Torpedo.

Julie Sheldon, a debutante with theatrical aspirations, sees Gene in his natural setting and begins to take an interest in the cowboy she formerly scorned. Meanwhile, Gene rounds up the Wildhacks and fights them single-handedly, forcing them to sing on his broadcast. When the brothers become determined to get revenge, Gene runs for sheriff so he will be in position to clean up the Wildhack political machine for good and also make use of the "Vote for Autry" song. During the battles that ensue, one of Gene's friends is killed. Gene discovers evidence that identifies the Wildhacks as the killers.

== Cast ==
- Gene Autry as Gene Autry
- Jimmy Durante as Cornelius J. Courtney
- Ann Miller as Julie Shelton
- Barton MacLane as Mark Wildhack
- Barbara Jo Allen as Veronica Whipple
- George "Gabby" Hayes as Pop Laramie
- Jerome Cowan as Tommy Summerville
- Mary Lee as Penny Curtis
- Joe Sawyer as Jasper Wildhack
- Horace McMahon as Bud Wildhack
- Clarence Wilson as Judge Henderson
- William "Billy" Benedict as Slim
- Maxine Ardell as Majorette (uncredited)
- Billy Bletcher as Scarlet Shadow Radio Actor
- Bob Wills and The Texas Playboys as Musicians (uncredited)
- Dick Elliott as Sheriff Barstow (uncredited)
- Slim Whitaker as Autry Voter on Trolley (uncredited)
- Champion as Champion, Gene's Horse (uncredited)

== Production ==
=== Casting ===
Melody Ranch marks the first romantic leading lady role for dancer Ann Miller. In one love scene Miller and Autry kiss. Negative advance publicity, however, led Republic Pictures to cut the kiss from the final print. Autry later recalled,

Actually we kissed there at the telephone. There was a lot of (advance) publicity over that. The public relations department at republic put out a story I was going to be kissing Ann Miller in a picture. So they were flooded with a lot of letters from the kids saying 'Don't let Gene Autry kiss Ann Miller in the picture—that's sissy!' So finally at the last minute (Republic) said, 'You're taking a chance on it—why raise a controversy with the kids?' so they cut it all out.

Miller would later claim incorrectly that she received Gene's first screen kiss, a distinction that belongs to Barbara Pepper and Ann Rutherford.

=== Filming and budget ===
Melody Ranch was filmed September 16 to October 5, 1940. The film had an operating budget of $181,275 (equal to $4,165,880 today), and a negative cost of $177,520.

=== Stuntwork ===
- Yakima Canutt
- Wally West
- Joe Yrigoyen (Gene Autry's stunt double)

=== Filming locations ===
- Alabama Hills, Lone Pine, California, USA
- Mammoth Lakes, California, USA
- Red Rock Canyon State Park, Highway 14, Cantil, California, USA
- Republic Studios, 4024 Radford Avenue, North Hollywood, Los Angeles, California, USA

=== Soundtracks ===
- "Stake Your Claim on Melody Ranch" (Jule Styne, Eddie Cherkose) by Gene Autry and cowboys
- "Stake Your Claim on Melody Ranch" (reprise) by Gene Autry and Ann Miller
- "Rodeo Rose" (Jule Styne, Eddie Cherkose) by Gene Autry and musicians
- "Jeanie With the Light Brown Hair" (Stephen Foster)
- "Welcome Home" by the children
- "Torpedo Joe" (Jule Styne, Eddie Cherkose) by Mary Lee with piano accompaniment
- "We Never Dream the Same Dream Twice" (Gene Autry, Fred Rose) by Gene Autry and Ann Miller
- "My Gal Sal" (Paul Dresser) by Ann Miller (vocals and tap dance) and male chorus
- "William Tell Overture" (Gioachino Rossini)
- "Back to the City Again" (Ray Whitley, Jule Styne, Eddie Cherkose) by Joe Sawyer and Horace McMahon
- "Call of the Canyon" (Billy Hill) by Gene Autry
- "What Are Cowboys Made Of" (Jule Styne, Eddie Cherkose) by Joe Sawyer and Horace McMahon
- "Vote for Autry" (Jule Styne, Eddie Cherkose) by Jimmy Durante and Mary Lee
- "Silver Threads Among the Gold" (H.P. Danks, Eben E. Rexford) by Barbara Jo Allen (a cappella)

== Melody Ranch Motion Picture Studio ==
In 1953, Gene Autry purchased the 110-acre (0.45 km^{2}) movie ranch, the Monogram Pictures Ranch property in Placerita Canyon State Park near Newhall, California and renamed it the Melody Ranch after this film.
