= Bandit King of Texas =

1949 film by Fred C. Brannon

- Theatrical release poster
- Directed by: Fred C. Brannon
- Screenplay by: Olive Cooper
- Produced by: Gordon Kay
- Starring: Allan Lane; Eddy Waller; Helene Stanley; James Nolan; Harry Lauter; Robert Bice
- Cinematography: John MacBurnie
- Edited by: Harold Minter
- Music by: Stanley Wilson
- Production company: Republic Pictures
- Distributed by: Republic Pictures
- Release date: August 29, 1949
- Running time: 60 minutes
- Country: United States
- Language: English

Bandit King of Texas is a 1949 American Western film directed by Fred C. Brannon and written by Olive Cooper. The film stars Allan Lane, Eddy Waller, Helene Stanley, James Nolan, Harry Lauter and Robert Bice. The film was released on August 29, 1949, by Republic Pictures.

== Cast ==
- Allan Lane as Rocky Lane
- Black Jack as Rocky's Horse
- Eddy Waller as Nugget Clark
- Helene Stanley as Cynthia Turner
- James Nolan as Dan McCabe
- Harry Lauter as Trem Turner
- Robert Bice as Henchman Gus
- John Hamilton as Marshal John Turner
- Lane Bradford as Henchman Cal Barker
- George Lloyd as Thatch Dobson
- Steve Clark as Tom Samson
- I. Stanford Jolley as Land Agent Willets
- Danni Sue Nolan as Emily Baldwin
- Richard Emory as Jim Baldwin
