= Back in the Saddle (film) =

1941 film by Lew Landers

- Theatrical release poster
- Directed by: Lew Landers
- Screenplay by: Richard Murphy; Jesse Lasky Jr.
- Produced by: Harry Grey
- Starring: Gene Autry; Smiley Burnette; Mary Lee
- Cinematography: Ernest Miller
- Edited by: Tony Martinelli
- Music by: Raoul Kraushaar (supervisor)
- Production company: Republic Pictures
- Distributed by: Republic Pictures
- Release date: March 14, 1941 (USA)
- Running time: 71 minutes
- Country: United States
- Language: English
- Budget: $84,572

Back in the Saddle is a 1941 American Western film directed by Lew Landers and starring Gene Autry, Smiley Burnette, and Mary Lee. Written by Richard Murphy and Jesse Lasky Jr., the film is about a singing cowboy who attempts to bring peace between ranchers and the operator of a copper mine whose chemicals are poisoning the area's water supply. The film features several of Autry's hit songs, including "Back in the Saddle Again", "I'm An Old Cowhand", and "You Are My Sunshine".

== Plot ==
Singing cowboy and ranch foreman Gene Autry (Gene Autry) and his sidekick Frog Millhouse (Smiley Burnette) are in New York City at a rodeo looking to "round up" their new ranch owner Tom Bennett (Edward Norris) and bring him back to Solitude, Arizona to run the Bar Cross ranch left to him by his late father. Tom, however, has no interest in leaving behind the excitement and glamour of the city for a boring life out West. Having promised Tom's father that he would take care of his son, Gene takes him to the train by force.

During the train ride back to Solitude, Gene meets his old friend, gambler Duke Winston (Addison Richards), who just eluded the men he cheated in a card game. When they arrive at Solitude, Tom manages to run off on his own and soon meets singer Taffy (Jacqueline Wells) and her teenaged sister Patsy (Mary Lee) who are in town looking for work. Thinking that Duke is as important as he pretends to be, Tom asks him to help Taffy get a singing job at the local saloon. Having already convinced mine owner and saloon owner E.G. Blaine (Arthur Loft) to hire him as manager, Duke has no problem hiring Taffy. Gene thinks that Taffy is a common showgirl after Tom's money, and his rudeness to her initiates a brawl. Afterwards, Tom tries to convince him he's wrong about Taffy, and that she's nice. Gene replies, "She's a dance hall girl in a mining town—they're all nice. That's their business."

Soon after, Gene discovers that cattle are dying on the banks of a stream used by Blaine and his copper mines; the waste from the mine is poisoning the cattle. Back in town, Gene tries to reason with Blaine, urging him to build proper drainage pits to clean the water, but when the foreman says they would have to shut down operations for weeks, Blaine refuses. Infuriated by Blaine's greed, Gene goes to Judge Bent to obtain an injunction to stop the mining, but learns that he must travel to Phoenix to get it. At the train station, Gene runs into Patsy and Taffy, and apologizes for his earlier behavior.

While Gene is away, Tom grows frustrated with the continued poisoning of the cattle, and despite Frog's warning that they should wait for the injunction, Tom rounds up the ranchers and rides to close down the mine. When they arrive at the mine, a gunfight breaks out and Tom kills one of Blaine's henchmen in self-defense. Blaine makes it look like murder, and the miners organize a lynch mob. Duke returns and persuades Blaine to stop them, saving Tom's life.

Afterwards, Blaine tells Gene that he'll ensure that Tom is given a fair trial if Gene withdraws the injunction. Gene agrees, but only if Blaine starts digging a drainage system voluntarily and ensures a fair trial. After the meeting, Gene tells Tom that he'll need to go to jail until a trial is held. Tom and Taffy are shocked that Gene would allow Tom to be taken to jail, believing that he must be conspiring with Blaine. When Blaine reveals to Duke that he has no intention of building the drainage system, Duke says, "Never be alone with yourself, Blaine. You wouldn't like it."

As the waste dumping continues, the ranchers complain to Gene that Blaine still has not constructed drainage pits to clean the water. When they pressure him to serve the injunction, Gene defends Tom and says he must have a chance. The ranchers reluctantly agree to wait two days until the trial. After they leave, Gene admits to Judge Bent that he now believes Blaine never intended to hold up his end of the bargain. The judge comes up with a plan to move the trial to another venue, and soon he catches a train to Phoenix to argue before a higher court that the Solitude court is prejudiced.

After the judge sends word that the trial can be moved, Gene serves Blaine with the injunction to stop the waste dumping. When Blaine hears that Gene has a change of venue order, he directs his henchman, Sheriff Simpson, to organize a trap that will implicate Gene and Tom in a jailbreak, during which they can both be killed. When Taffy learns about the trap, she tries to warn Gene but Blaine's men stop her. Patsy, however, is able to ride to the ranch and get Frog and the other men.

While Gene and Tom are trapped by Blaine's men in the jail, Duke sneaks in to help them during the shootout. When Blaine's men set the building on fire, Duke is shot and killed while helping Gene and Tom escape. Blaine is also killed. Frog and the ranch hands arrive and stampede their cattle through the town. After a street brawl, Blaine's men are arrested and taken away. Afterwards, Gene and Taffy join their friends at a picnic celebrating Tom's twenty-first birthday.

== Cast ==
- Gene Autry as Gene Autry
- Smiley Burnette as Frog Millhouse
- Mary Lee as Patsy
- Edward Norris as Tom Bennett
- Jacqueline Wells as Taffy
- Addison Richards as Duke Winston
- Arthur Loft as E.G. Blaine
- Edmund Elton as Judge Bent
- Joe McGuinn as Sheriff Simpson
- Edmund Cobb as Rancher Williams
- Robert Barron as Henchman Ward
- Stanley Blystone as Station Agent Jess (uncredited)
- Tom Ewell as Fight Spectator (uncredited)
- Cactus Mack as Barfly (uncredited)
- Frankie Marvin as Cowhand (uncredited)
- Fred 'Snowflake' Toones as Train Porter (uncredited)
- Phillip Trent as Jack, Tom's New York Friend (uncredited)
- Champion as Gene's Horse (uncredited)

== Production ==
=== Casting ===
The original working title for the film was Song at Twilight. Margaret Tallichet was originally offered the leading lady role but her husband, director William Wyler, persuaded her to join him in Sun Valley for a winter vacation instead. The role was then offered to Jacqueline Wells, who later gained semi-stardom under the name Julie Bishop during the war years. Wells was born in Denver, Colorado in 1914 and became a silent film child actress who transitioned easily to talkies and adult roles. She appeared in over 80 films between 1923 and 1957. One of her earliest credits was a silent serial, Bar C Mystery (1926). She is best remembered for the films she did at Warner Bros. during the war years, including Princess O'Rourke (1943), supporting Olivia de Havilland and Robert Cummings, Action in the North Atlantic (1943) opposite Humphrey Bogart, Rhapsody in Blue (1945) as Ira Gershwin's wife, and Cinderella Jones (1946). She is perhaps best remembered for her role as the prostitute who fell in love with John Wayne's character in Sands of Iwo Jima (1950). Autry would later remember her as "an interesting actress" who had talent, but "seemed doomed to work in nothing but B-westerns." Remembering her work on Back in the Saddle, Wells would later recall, "Actually, I didn't have much to do with Gene in the film, I had more scenes with Edward Norris." Regarding the singing sequences, she remembered, "Usually I was dubbed but, occasionally, if it wasn't something too difficult, I was allowed to do it. They prerecord the songs, then a huge machine comes onto the stage and you lip-sync to the recording."

=== Filming and budget ===
Back in the Saddle was filmed January 21 to February 4, 1941. The film had an operating budget of $84,572 (equal to $1,851,208 today), and a negative cost of $87,735.

=== Filming locations ===
- Victorville, California, USA
- Iverson Ranch, 1 Iverson Lane, Chatsworth, Los Angeles, California, USA
- Chatsworth Train Station, Chatsworth, Los Angeles, California, USA
- San Fernando Valley, California, USA (train tracks)

=== Stuntwork ===
- Tommy Coats
- Ben Corbett
- Jack Kirk (Smiley Burnette's stunt double)
- Jack Montgomery
- Nellie Walker (Jacqueline Wells' stunt double)
- Henry Wills
- Bob Woodward
- Bill Yrigoyen
- Joe Yrigoyen (Gen Autry's stunt double)

=== Soundtrack ===
- "Back in the Saddle Again" (Gene Autry, Ray Whitley) by Gene Autry
- "In the Jailhouse Now" (Jimmie Rogers) by Gene Autry
- "Ninety-Nine Bullfrogs" (Smiley Burnette) by Smiley Burnette
- "Swingin' Sam the Cowboy Man" (Jule Styne, Sol Meyer) by Mary Lee
- "Where the River Meets the Range" (Jule Styne, Sol Meyer) by Jacqueline Wells
- "When the Cactis is in Bloom" (Jimmie Rogers) by Gene Autry
- "I'm An Old Cowhand" (Johnny Mercer) by Gene Autry and Mary Lee
- "You Are My Sunshine" (Jimmie Davis, Charles Mitchell) by Gene Autry
