= Bradford Ropes =

American novelist

Bradford Ropes (January 1, 1905 – November 21, 1966) was an American novelist and screenwriter whose work includes the novel 42nd Street that was adapted into the 1933 film of the same name, which then became a Tony Award-winning stage musical. The same year, his next novel, Stage Mother, was also adapted to film, Ropes’s novels were inspired by his own experiences as a performer, and focused on the lives of gay men in show business. He also wrote many Western stories, screenplays for Roy Rogers and Rex Allen, and contributed to films starring Abbott and Costello as well as Laurel and Hardy.

Ropes wrote in 1932 that America was still waiting for the "Uncle Tom's Cabin of the chorus girl."

Born in Boston, Ropes died in the Wollaston section of Quincy, Massachusetts at the age of 61.

== Works ==
Novels

- 42nd Street (1932)
- Stage Mother (1933)
- Go Into Your Dance (1934)
- Mr. Tilley Takes a Walk (1951)

Films (screenplays unless noted)

- 42nd Street (novel, 1933)
- Stage Mother (novel and screenplay, 1933)
- Go Into Your Dance (novel, 1935)
- Hooray for Love (contributor to treatment, 1935)
- Meet the Boyfriend (1937)
- The Hit Parade (1937)
- Circus Girl (1937)
- Lord Jeff (story, 1938)
- Rancho Grande (1940)
- Melody Ranch (1940)
- Gaucho Serenade (1940)
- Melody and Moonlight (1940)
- Sing, Dance, Plenty Hot (1940)
- Hit Parade of 1941 (1940)
- Hullabaloo (idea, 1940)
- Angels with Broken Wings (1941)
- Glamour Boy (1941)
- Ridin' on a Rainbow (1941)
- Ice-Capades Revue (1942)
- Joan of Ozark (additional dialogue, 1942)
- Ship Ahoy (story, 1942)
- True to the Army (1942)
- The Man from Music Mountain (1943) – starring Roy Rogers
- Hands Across the Border (1944) – starring Roy Rogers
- Hi, Good Lookin'! (1944)
- The Cowboy and the Senorita (story, 1944) – starring Roy Rogers
- Swing in the Saddle (1944)
- Steppin' in Society (adaptation and screenplay, 1945)
- Sunbonnet Sue (story, 1945)
- Why Girls Leave Home (1945)
- Song of Arizona (story, 1946) – starring Roy Rogers
- The Time of Their Lives (1946)
- Nothing But Trouble (additional dialogue, 1947) – starring Laurel & Hardy
- Buck Privates Come Home (story, 1947) – starring Abbott & Costello
- Pirates of Monterey (story, 1947)
- Flame of Youth (1949)
- The Arizona Cowboy (1950) – starring Rex Allen
- Belle of Old Mexico (1950)
- Redwood Forest Trail (1950) – starring Rex Allen
