= Cowboy and the Senorita =

1944 film by Joseph Kane

- Film poster
- Directed by: Joseph Kane
- Written by: Bradford Ropes (story); Gordon Kahn (screenplay)
- Produced by: Harry Grey (associate producer)
- Starring: Roy Rogers; Dale Evans
- Cinematography: Reggie Lanning
- Edited by: Tony Martinelli
- Music by: Joseph Dubin; Mort Glickman; Charles Maxwell; Marlin Skiles
- Production company: Republic Pictures
- Distributed by: Republic Pictures
- Release date: May 13, 1944 (United States)
- Running time: 78 minutes 52 minutes
- Country: United States
- Language: English

Cowboy and the Senorita is a 1944 American Western film directed by Joseph Kane and starring Roy Rogers. The film marked the first appearance together of Rogers and his future wife, Dale Evans.

== Plot ==
Roy and his sidekick Teddy Bear are mistaken for the kidnappers of a runaway teenager. After escaping from a posse the two find the teenager, Chip who explains their innocence and has her sister Ysobel and her soon to be husband the rich Craig Allen give the pair jobs. Chip tells Roy she is sure her late father had riches hidden away that the unscrupulous Craig Allen tries to take for himself. The film opens and closes with musical numbers.

== Cast ==
- Roy Rogers as Roy Rogers
- Trigger as Trigger
- Mary Lee as Chip Williams
- Dale Evans as Ysobel Martinez
- John Hubbard as Craig Allen
- Guinn "Big Boy" Williams as "Teddy" Bear
- Fuzzy Knight as Fuzzy
- Dorothy Christy as Lulubelle
- Lucien Littlefield as Judge Loomis
- Hal Taliaferro as Matt Ferguson
- Jack Kirk as Sheriff Gilbert
- Capella as Specialty dancer
- Patricia as Specialty dancer
- Jane Beebe as Specialty dancer
- Ben Rochelle as Specialty dancer
- Bob Nolan as Bob Nolan (Leader, Sons of the Pioneers)
- Sons of the Pioneers as Musicians, Ranch hands

== Soundtrack ==
- "Cowboy and the Senorita" (Music by Phil Ohman, lyrics by Ned Washington)
- "What'll I Use for Money?" (Music by Phil Ohman, lyrics by Ned Washington)
- "The Enchilada Man" (Music by Phil Ohman, lyrics by Ned Washington)
- "Bunk House Bugle Boy" (Written by Tim Spencer and Bob Nolan
- "Bésame Mucho" (Written by Consuelo Velázquez)
- "She Wore a Yellow Ribbon" (Written by George A. Norton)
