= Sing, Dance, Plenty Hot =

- Theatrical release poster
- Directed by: Lew Landers
- Screenplay by: Gordon Rigby; Bradford Ropes
- Story by: Vera Caspary; Bradford Ropes
- Produced by: Robert North
- Starring: Ruth Terry; Johnny Downs; Barbara Jo Allen; Billy Gilbert; Claire Carleton; Mary Lee
- Cinematography: Ernest Miller
- Edited by: Edward Mann
- Music by: William Lava
- Production company: Republic Pictures
- Distributed by: Republic Pictures
- Release date: August 10, 1940
- Running time: 70 minutes
- Country: United States
- Language: English

Sing, Dance, Plenty Hot is a 1940 American comedy film directed by Lew Landers and written by Gordon Rigby and Bradford Ropes. The film stars Ruth Terry, Johnny Downs, Barbara Jo Allen, Billy Gilbert, Claire Carleton and Mary Lee. The film was released on August 10, 1940, by Republic Pictures.

== Cast ==
- Ruth Terry as Irene
- Johnny Downs as Johnny
- Barbara Jo Allen as Susan
- Billy Gilbert as Hector
- Claire Carleton as Evelyn
- Mary Lee as Judy
- Elisabeth Risdon as Agatha
- Lester Matthews as Scott
- Leonard Carey as Henderson
