= Ridin' on a Rainbow =

1941 film by Lew Landers

- Theatrical release poster
- Directed by: Lew Landers
- Screenplay by: Bradford Ropes; Doris Malloy
- Story by: Bradford Ropes
- Produced by: Harry Grey
- Starring: Gene Autry; Smiley Burnette; Mary Lee
- Cinematography: William Nobels
- Edited by: Tony Martinelli
- Music by: Raoul Kraushaar (supervisor)
- Production company: Republic Pictures
- Distributed by: Republic Pictures
- Release date: January 24, 1941 (U.S.)
- Running time: 75 minutes
- Country: United States
- Language: English
- Budget: $91,854

Ridin' on a Rainbow is a 1941 American western musical film directed by Lew Landers and starring Gene Autry, Smiley Burnette and Mary Lee. Written by Bradford Ropes and Doris Malloy, based on a story by Ropes, the film is about a singing cowboy whose investigation of a bank robbery takes him to a showboat, where he finds that a teenage singer's father has been working with the robbers to provide for her future. The film received an Academy Award nomination for best original song for "Be Honest with Me" (Gene Autry, Fred Rose).

== Plot ==
Singing cowboy and rancher Gene Autry (Gene Autry) arrives in the town of Riverton and helps his fellow cattlemen sell their herds for the first profit they've seen in four years. Gene convinces the cattlemen to deposit their money into Eben Carter's bank for safekeeping before going out to watch the parade. Captain 'Lijah Bartlett (Ferris Taylor) has just arrived on the riverboat Jolly Betsy with its troupe of entertainers who are now parading through town. While the townspeople are distracted, Matt Evans (Byron Foulger), a washed-up dancer looking to provide for his young daughter Patsy (Mary Lee), reluctantly assists Blake and Morrison rob the bank. Evans is shocked when they gun down Carter, but still agrees when the men order him to bring the money to them in nearby Colesburg.

Feeling responsible for the loss of his friends' money, Gene sets out to find the bank robbers and recover the stolen money, with the help of his sidekick Frog Millhouse (Smiley Burnette) and Sheriff Jim Mason (Guy Usher). They track Evans to the showboat, but Evans is able to elude them after telling Patsy to meet him later in Colesburg. With Patsy as their only lead, Gene persuades the sheriff to go easy on her. As part of their investigation, Gene and Frog are hired as performers by Captain Bartlett, who does not know they are working with the sheriff. Genuinely concerned with Patsy's welfare, Gene tries to befriend the youngster, who is torn between telling the truth and her loyalty to her father. Patsy is able to convince Gene to let her go ashore alone at Colesburg, but when she sees the sheriff, who has arrived without Gene's knowledge, she assumes that Gene is going to double-cross her and informs the captain of Gene's identity.

Patsy gathers the stolen money her father had hidden on the boat and sneaks ashore to the inn where he is hiding. There she pleads with her father to turn himself in and return the money. Before they can leave, however, Blake and Morrison arrive at the inn. Patsy locks herself in the next room and listens in horror as the bank robbers shoot her father after he tells them where the money is stashed. Patsy gives her dog Spotlight her room key, helps him through a window, and tells him to go to the showboat, where the dog gives the key to Gene. Knowing what has happened, Gene, Frog, and the others rush to the inn and rescue Patsy just as the bank robbers are about to kidnap her. After giving his farewell performance on the showboat, Gene takes Patsy to live with him on his ranch.

== Cast ==
- Gene Autry as Gene Autry
- Smiley Burnette as Frog Millhouse
- Mary Lee as Patsy Evans
- Carol Adams as Sally Bartlett
- Ferris Taylor as Captain 'Lijah Bartlett
- Georgia Caine as Mariah Bartlett
- Byron Foulger as Matt 'Pop' Evans
- Ralf Harolde as Blake, Bank Robber
- Jimmy Conlin as Joe
- Guy Usher as Sheriff Jim Mason
- Anthony Warde as 'Scoop' Morrison, Bank Robber
- Forrest Taylor as Rancher Jeff Billings
- Burr Caruth as Banker Eben Carter
- Frankie Marvin as Cowhand (uncredited)
- Fred 'Snowflake' Toones as Handyman (uncredited)
- Slim Whitaker as Bartender (uncredited)
- Champion as Gene's Horse (uncredited)

== Production ==
=== Filming and budget ===
Ridin' on a Rainbow was filmed November 26 to December 13, 1940. The film had an operating budget of $91,854 (equal to $2,110,897 today), and a negative cost of $88,767.

=== Stuntwork ===
- Joe Yrigoyen (Gene Autry's stunt double)
- Bill Yrigoyen (Ralf Harolde's stunt double)
- Bob Woodward (Anthony Warde's stunt double)
- Matty Roubert
- Francis Walker
- Fred Schaefer

=== Filming locations ===
- Morrison Ranch, Agoura Hills, California, USA
- Lake Hemet, Riverside County, California, USA

=== Soundtrack ===
- "Hunky Dunky Dory" (Jule Styne, Sol Meyer) by Gene Autry and Smiley Burnette
- "Sing a Song of Laughter" (Jule Styne, Sol Meyer) by Mary Lee
- "What's Your Favorite Holiday?" (Jule Styne, Sol Meyer) by Mary Lee
- "Be Honest With Me" (Gene Autry, Fred Rose) by Gene Autry
- "Steamboat Bill" (Ken Shields) by Ken Shields and the Leighton Brothers by Gene Autry and Smiley Burnette
- "Ridin' on a Rainbow" (Don George, Teddy Hall, Jean Herbert) by Gene Autry
- "Carry Me Back to the Lone Prairie" (Carson Robison) by Gene Autry and Mary Lee
- "I'm the Only Lonely One" (Jule Styne, Sol Meyer) by Mary Lee
- "Ridin' on a Rainbow" (Don George, Teddy Hall, Jean Herbert) by Gene Autry and cast
