= Betty Burbridge =

American screenwriter (1895–1987)

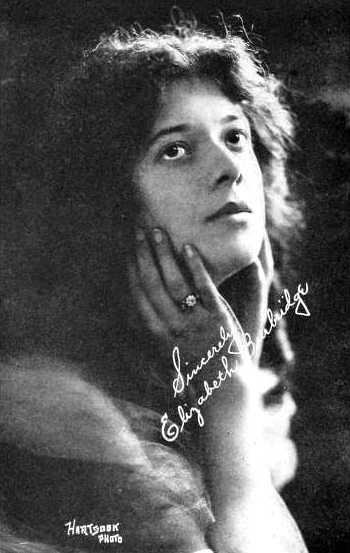
- Publicity photo, 1915
- Born: Elizabeth Mabelle Burbridge; November or December 8, 1894; San Diego, California, US
- Died: September 19, 1987; Tarzana, California, US
- Resting place: Angelus-Rosedale Cemetery; 34.04199°N 118.29784°W
- Occupations: Screenwriter; Actress
- Years active: 1913–1952
- Known for: Western screenplays
- Relatives: Stephen G. Burbridge, grandfather

Elizabeth Mabelle Burbridge (November or December 8, 1894 – September 19, 1987) was an American screenwriter and actress, best known for her Western screenplays.

== Biography ==
Burbridge was born in San Diego, California, on November or December 8, 1894, the granddaughter of Civil War Major General Stephen G. Burbridge. Her mother was Mabel Burbridge, who wrote as one of the "Prudence Penny" columnists.

She began her career as an actress at age 17, working for Thomas H. Ince's studio. She was in 62 silent short films between 1913 and 1916 using her birth name Elizabeth Burbridge. She also appeared in four feature-length silent films: Rumpelstiltskin (1915), The Winged Idol (1915), The Tongues of Men (1916), and Charity (1916).

In 1917, Burbridge began her career as a screenwriter, working at first on silent short films. By 1923, she was writing a syndicated newspaper column under the name Prudence Penny Jr., providing readers advice on interior decorating and love. In 1924, Burbridge was hired by film producer Lester F. Scott Jr. as a scriptwriter for his newly formed Action Pictures. From 1924 to 1929, she wrote a majority of Action Pictures' low-budget silent films for Buddy Roosevelt, Buffalo Bill, Jr., and Wally Wales. By 1926, she was working almost exclusively on western films. With the advent of sound films, Burbridge became a freelance writer, working on films for Rex Lease, Bob Custer, Jack Perrin, and Tom Tyler.

In 1935, Burbridge was hired by Republic Pictures and became the principal writer for singing cowboy Gene Autry in the 1930s and 1940s. In addition to providing the story for Melody Trail (1935), she wrote thirteen western film screenplays for Autry: The Singing Vagabond (1935), Springtime in the Rockies (1937), Gold Mine in the Sky (1938), Man from Music Mountain (1938), Prairie Moon (1938), Colorado Sunset (1939), Rovin' Tumbleweeds (1939), South of the Border (1939), Rancho Grande (1940), Gaucho Serenade (1940), Ride, Tenderfoot, Ride (1940), Melody Ranch (1940), and Stardust on the Sage (1942). In total, Burbridge wrote 124 films between 1917 and 1949.

In the 1950s, Burbridge began writing for television, contributing several screenplays for The Cisco Kid television series in 1950 and 1951, and three screenplays for The Gene Autry Show from 1950 to 1952. Her last credited screenplay was for an episode of The Range Rider television series in 1952. Burbridge died on September 19, 1987, in Tarzana, California, at the age of 92.

== Selected filmography ==
- Colonel Custard's Last Stand (1914)
- Matrimony (1915)
- The Winged Idol (1915)
- Tears and Smiles (1917)
- Rough Ridin' (1924)
- Battling Buddy (1924)
- Walloping Wallace (1924)
- Reckless Courage (1925)
- Double Action Daniels (1925)
- The Saddle Cyclone (1925)
- Galloping On (1925)
- Double Daring (1926)
- The Fighting Cheat (1926)
- Twisted Triggers (1926)
- Ace of Action (1926)
- Bad Man's Bluff (1926)
- The Twin Triggers (1926)
- Pals in Peril (1927)
- Tearin' Into Trouble (1927)
- The Interferin' Gent (1927)
- The Phantom Buster (1927)
- White Pebbles (1927)
- Soda Water Cowboy (1927)
- The Cowboy Cavalier (1928)
- The Flyin' Buckaroo (1928)
- Anybody's Blonde (1931)
- Is There Justice? (1931)
- Sin's Pay Day (1932)
- Between Fighting Men (1932)
- The Lone Trail (1932)
- The Secrets of Wu Sin (1932)
- Dance Hall Hostess (1933)
- Redhead (1934)
- False Pretenses (1935)
- Get That Man (1935)
- Melody Trail (1935)
- The Singing Vagabond (1935)
- Springtime in the Rockies (1937)
- Gold Mine in the Sky (1938)
- Man from Music Mountain (1938)
- Prairie Moon (1938)
- Red River Range (1938)
- Colorado Sunset (1939)
- Rovin' Tumbleweeds (1939)
- South of the Border (1939)
- Rancho Grande (1940)
- Gaucho Serenade (1940)
- Ride, Tenderfoot, Ride (1940)
- Melody Ranch (1940)
- Stardust on the Sage (1942)
- Frontier Fury (1943)
- West of the Rio Grande (1944)
- The Cherokee Flash (1945)
- The Cisco Kid Returns (1945)
- In Old New Mexico (1945)
- Trail of the Mounties (1947)
