= Three Little Sisters =

1944 film by Joseph Santley

- Theatrical release poster
- Directed by: Joseph Santley
- Screenplay by: Olive Cooper
- Story by: Olive Cooper; Maurice Clark
- Produced by: Harry Grey
- Starring: Mary Lee; Ruth Terry; Cheryl Walker; William Terry; Jackie Moran; Charles Arnt
- Cinematography: Reggie Lanning
- Edited by: Fred Allen
- Music by: R. Dale Butts
- Production company: Republic Pictures
- Distributed by: Republic Pictures
- Release date: July 31, 1944
- Running time: 69 minutes
- Country: United States
- Language: English

Three Little Sisters is a 1944 American comedy directed by Joseph Santley, written by Olive Cooper, and starring Mary Lee, Ruth Terry, Cheryl Walker, William Terry, Jackie Moran and Charles Arnt. It was released on July 31, 1944, by Republic Pictures.

== Plot ==
Two sisters cover for a third whose misled GI pen pal has come to visit from Arizona.

== Cast ==
- Mary Lee as Sue Scott
- Ruth Terry as Hallie Scott
- Cheryl Walker as Lily Scott
- William Terry as Pvt. Robert Mason
- Jackie Moran as Chad Jones
- Charles Arnt as Ezra Larkin
- Frank Jenks as Pvt. 'Rosy' Rowman
- Bill Shirley as Pvt. Ferguson
- Tom Fadden as Ambrose Pepperdine
- Tom London as Twitchell
- Milton Kibbee as Tom Scott
- Addison Richards as Col. Flemming
- Lillian Randolph as Mabel
- Sam McDaniel as Benjy
- Forrest Taylor as Mayor Thatcher
