= Song of Nevada =

1944 film

- Directed by: Joseph Kane
- Written by: Olive Cooper (original screenplay); Gordon Kahn (original screenplay)
- Produced by: Harry Grey (associate producer)
- Starring: See below
- Cinematography: Jack A. Marta
- Edited by: Tony Martinelli
- Music by: Mort Glickman
- Distributed by: Republic Pictures
- Release date: 5 August 1944
- Running time: 75 minutes (original version); 54 minutes (edited version)
- Country: United States
- Language: English

Song of Nevada is a 1944 American musical Western film directed by Joseph Kane, and starring Roy Rogers and Dale Evans.

== Plot ==
Rancher John Barrabee is upset his daughter doesn't want to stay in the West; instead, she is a New York City nightclub singer who is engaged to marry shady playboy Rollo Bingham. Travelling back west, Barrabee's plane makes an emergency landing in Nevada and awaits another airplane that brings them parts needed to repair the aircraft. Barrabee wanders off and meets trail boss Roy Rogers and the Sons of the Pioneers. Happy he is back roping and riding with fellow cowboys, he misses his plane's departure, and joins Roy in droving cattle.

After the cattle drive, Barrabee discovers he is presumed dead as his plane crashed with no survivors. Barrabee uses the opportunity to get Roy to straighten out his daughter.

== Cast ==
- Roy Rogers as Roy Rogers
- Trigger as Trigger, Roy's Horse
- Dale Evans as Joan Barrabee
- Mary Lee as Kitty Hanley
- Lloyd Corrigan as Professor Hanley
- Thurston Hall as John Barrabee
- John Eldredge as Rollo Bingham
- Forrest Taylor as Colonel Jack Thompson
- George Meeker as Chris Calahan
- Emmett Vogan as Master of Ceremonies
- LeRoy Mason as Ferguson
- Bob Nolan as Bob
- Sons of the Pioneers as Musicians
- Helen Talbot as the Stewardess

== Soundtrack ==
- "It's Love, Love, Love" (written by Mack David, Joan Whitney and Alex Kramer)
- "New Moon Over Nevada" (written by Ken Carson)
- "A Cowboy Has to Yodel in the Morning" (written by Ken Carson)
- "Hi Ho Little Dogies" (written by Glenn Spencer)
- "The Wigwam Song" (written by Glenn Spencer)
- "Nevada" (written by Charles Henderson)
- "What Are We Going to Do?" (written by Charles Henderson)
- "Harum Scarum Baron of the Harmonium" (written by Charles Henderson)
- "And Her Golden Hair Was Hanging Down Her Back" (written by Felix McGlennon and Monroe Rosenfeld)
- "Scrub Scrub" (written by Smiley Burnette)
