= South of the Border (1939 film) =

- Theatrical release poster
- Directed by: George Sherman
- Screenplay by: Betty Burbridge; Gerald Geraghty
- Story by: Dorrell McGowan; Stuart E. McGowan
- Produced by: William A. Berke
- Starring: Gene Autry; Smiley Burnette; June Storey
- Cinematography: William Nobles
- Edited by: Lester Orlebeck
- Production company: Republic Pictures
- Distributed by: Republic Pictures
- Release date: December 15, 1939 (U.S.)
- Running time: 71 minutes
- Country: United States
- Language: English
- Budget: $75,947

South of the Border is a 1939 Western film directed by George Sherman and starring Gene Autry, Smiley Burnette, and June Storey. Written by Betty Burbridge and Gerald Geraghty, based on a story by Dorrell and Stuart E. McGowan, the film is about a federal agent who is sent to Mexico to prevent foreign powers from gaining control of Mexican oil refineries and fomenting revolution among the Mexican people.

== Plot ==
United States government agents Gene Autry (Gene Autry) and Frog Millhouse (Smiley Burnette) are sent down to Mexico to foil the plans of foreign spies trying to start a revolution on the Mexican island of Palermo in order to gain control of American oil facilities and establish a submarine refueling base. When they arrive in Mexico they attend a fiesta, where Gene has his heart stolen by the beautiful Señorita Dolores Mendoza (Lupita Tovar).

Soon after, Gene goes to the American Consulate seeking further instructions about his mission. He is informed that Dolores' brother Andreo (Duncan Renaldo) is the pawn of a gang of foreign agents operating on the island of Palmero with the objective of establishing an enemy submarine base that would put an end to Pan American neutrality. The Consul orders Gene to leave for Palermo immediately, using the excuse that he and his men are to help Don Diego Mendoza (Frank Reicher), Dolores's uncle, with his cattle roundup.

On the island of Palermo, Gene and Frog learn that Don Diego's caballeros are in fear of Andreo and his band of revolutionaries. Intercepting a secret code broadcast over the radio, Gene traces the signal to the abandoned oil fields and confirms that enemy agents are plotting to gain control of American oil holdings intending to use them for establishing a submarine refueling base. Gene cleverly allows one of the agents to escape and follows him to the office of Saunders (Alan Edwards), the head of the gang of foreign spies. Before he can act, Gene is captured by Saunders, who then leads his men and a convoy of oil trucks to the submarines waiting offshore.

Frog rescues Gene, and with the help of the Mexican army, they commandeer the trucks and arrest Saunders and his gang. Andreo tries to escape and is killed. The threat of revolution in Mexico is ended. Gene returns to his sweetheart Dolores, only to learn that she has become a nun to atone for her brother's sins.

== Cast ==
- Gene Autry as Gene Autry
- Smiley Burnette as Frog
- June Storey as Lois Martin
- Lupita Tovar as Dolores Mendoza
- Mary Lee as Patsy
- Duncan Renaldo as Andreo Mendoza
- Frank Reicher as Don Diego Mendoza
- Alan Edwards as Saunders
- Claire Du Brey as Dueña
- Dick Botiller as Bandit Pablo
- William Farnum as Padre
- Selmer Jackson as American Consul
- The Checkerboard Band as Musicians
- George Montgomery as Bandit (uncredited)
- Slim Whitaker as Carlos (uncredited)
- Champion as Champ, Gene's Horse

== Production ==
=== Casting ===
South of the Border introduced the fifteen-year-old actress Mary Lee in her first of nine appearances in Gene Autry films. On loan-out from popular bandleader Ted Weems, Lee earned $250 a week and sang on three songs in the film, including a duet with Autry on "Goodbye Little Darlin' Goodbye" and a solo vocal on "Merry-Go-Roundup". Born Mary Lee Wooters in Centralia, Illinois, Lee grew up in Ottawa, Illinois, where she sang on the radio with her father and older sister. She was discovered by Warner Bros. talent scouts while singing with the Ted Weems Orchestra and signed for a role in Nancy Drew, Reporter (1939). After hearing Lee singing one of his songs, Autry arranged for her to appear with him in South of the Border. In five of her nine film appearances with Autry, Lee played the younger sister of June Storey's characters. Lee's older sister Vera worked as one of Autry's secretaries, and her father worked for years as a caretaker at Autry's home and offices.

=== Filming and budget ===
South of the Border was filmed October 30 to November 11, 1939. The film had an operating budget of $75,947 (equal to $1,082,859 today).

=== Stuntwork ===
- Joe Yrigoyen (Gene Autry's stunt double)
- Jack Kirk
- Nellie Walker
- Bill Yrigoyen
- Duke York

=== Soundtrack ===
- "South of the Border" (Jimmy Kennedy, Michael Carr) by Gene Autry
- "South of the Border" (Reprise) by Gene Autry, Smiley Burnette, June Storey, Mary Lee, and The Checkerboard Band at the end
- "Come to the Fiesta" (Art Wenzel) by Gene Autry, Smiley Burnette, and The Checkerboard Band
- "Moon of Manana" (Gene Autry, Johnny Marvin) by Gene Autry
- "Girl of My Dreams" (Sunny Clapp) by Gene Autry (vocal and guitar)
- "Goodbye Little Darlin' Goodbye" (Gene Autry, Johnny Marvin) by Gene Autry and Mary Lee
- "Merry-Go-Roundup" (Gene Autry, Johnny Marvin, Fred Rose) by Mary Lee
- "When the Cactus Blooms Again" (Gene Autry, Johnny Marvin) by Gene Autry, Smiley Burnette and The Checkerboard Band
- "Horse Opry" (Fred Rose) by Gene Autry and June Storey
- "Fat Caballero" (Smiley Burnette) by Smiley Burnette

== Accolades ==
The film is recognized by American Film Institute in these lists:

- 2004: AFI's 100 Years...100 Songs:
  - "South of the Border" – Nominated
