= Idaho (1943 film) =

1943 film by Joseph Kane

- Directed by: Joseph Kane
- Written by: Roy Chanslor (original screenplay); Olive Cooper (original screenplay)
- Produced by: Joseph Kane (associate producer)
- Starring: Roy Rogers; Trigger
- Cinematography: Reggie Lanning
- Edited by: Arthur Roberts
- Music by: Mort Glickman; Paul Sawtell; Marlin Skiles
- Production company: Republic Pictures
- Distributed by: Republic Pictures
- Release date: March 10, 1943 (United States)
- Running time: 70 minutes 54 minutes
- Country: United States
- Language: English

Idaho is a 1943 American Western film directed by Joseph Kane.

== Plot ==
Judge John Grey decides to close down Belle Bonner's casino as a bad influence to the children in the community. It turns out, though, that Grey is actually a former outlaw named Tom Allison, and this information is used by Belle and her crony Duke Springer to blackmail the judge. It's up to Roy Rogers to ride into town and save the day.

== Cast ==
- Roy Rogers as State Ranger Roy Rogers
- Smiley Burnette as Frog Millhouse
- Bob Nolan as Singer
- Sons of the Pioneers as Musicians
- Virginia Grey as Terry Grey
- Harry Shannon as Judge John Grey aka Tom Allison
- Ona Munson as Belle Bonner
- Dick Purcell as Duke Springer
- Onslow Stevens as State Ranger Bob Stevens
- Arthur Hohl as Spike Madagan
- Hal Taliaferro as Bud (Belle's henchman)
- The Robert Mitchell Boys Choir as Wayward Boys at the Ranch
