= John Archer (actor) =

American actor (1915–1999)

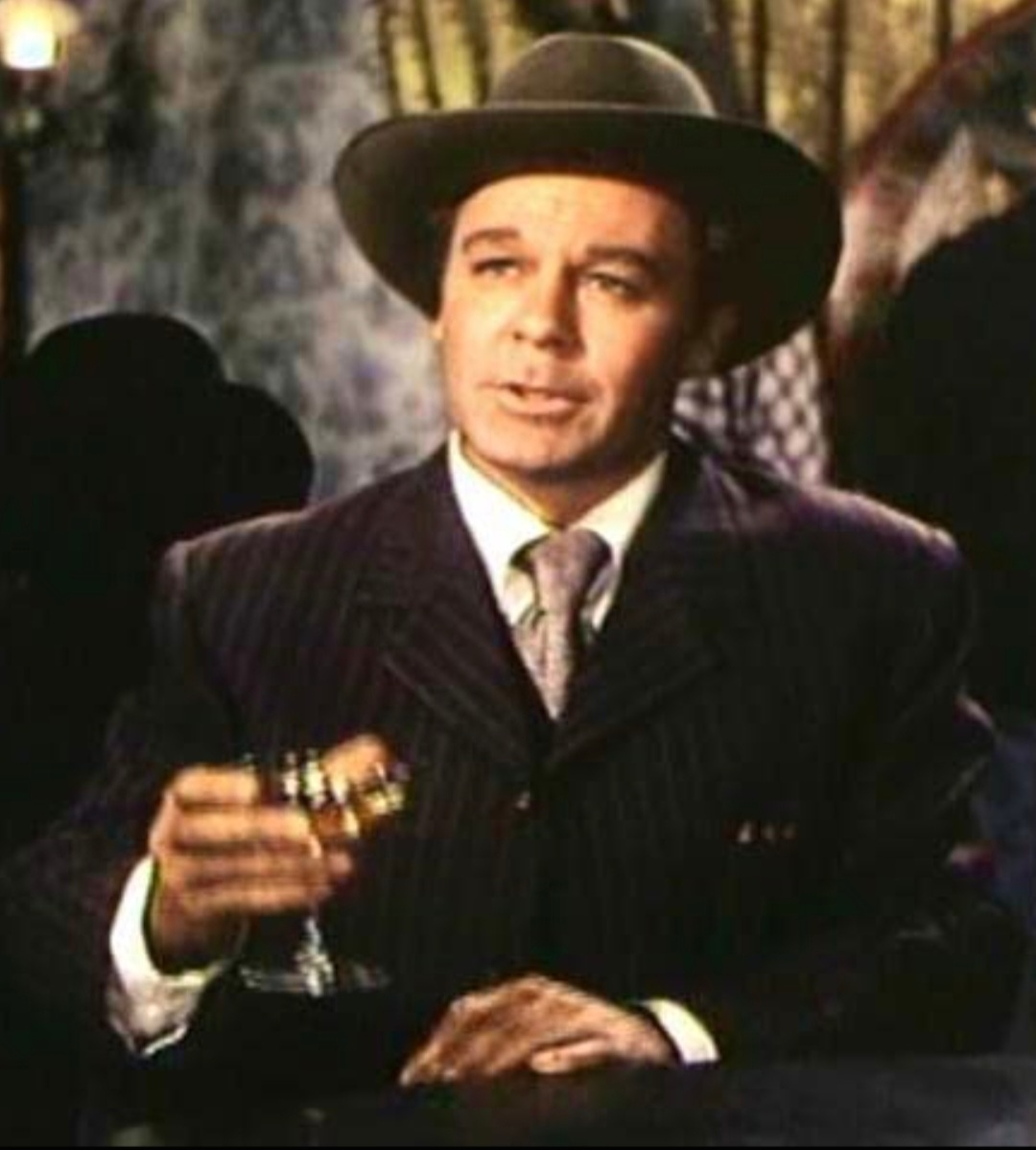
- Archer in The Big Trees (1952)
- Born: Ralph Bowman; May 8, 1915; Osceola, Nebraska, U.S.
- Died: December 3, 1999 (aged 84); Redmond, Washington, U.S.
- Occupation: Actor
- Years active: 1938–1996
- Spouses: Marjorie Lord (m. 1941; div. 1955); Ann Leddy (m. 1956)
- Children: 4, including Anne Archer
- Relatives: Tommy Davis (grandson)

John Archer (born Ralph Bowman; May 8, 1915 – December 3, 1999) was an American actor.

== Early life ==
Archer was born Ralph Bowman in Osceola, Nebraska, the son of Eunice Melba (née Crawford) and Joseph Emmett Bowman. Archer moved to California at the age of five. He attended Hollywood High School and the University of Southern California, where he studied cinematography, expecting to work behind the camera.

== Radio ==
When finding work in the field of cinematography proved difficult Archer drifted into acting, working as a radio announcer and actor, including one year (beginning in 1944) in the starring role of Lamont Cranston in The Shadow, a role originally played by Orson Welles.

== Stage ==
Archer honed his acting skills in plays at the Ben Bard Playhouse. He appeared on Broadway in The Odds on Mrs. Oakley (1944), a farce; One-Man Show (1945); A Place of Our Own (1945), the musical The Day Before Spring (1945-1946); This Time Tomorrow (1947); and the comedies Strange Bedfellows (1948); and Captain Brassbound's Conversion (1950-1951).

== Film ==
Archer made his film debut in 1938. He acted in films for Universal and Republic under his birth name. In a radio contest sponsored by Jesse L. Lasky on the program Gateway to Hollywood, he won the top prize, an RKO contract in the name of "John Archer." He appeared in the films Hello, Frisco, Hello; Guadalcanal Diary; White Heat; Destination Moon; Rock Around the Clock; She Devil; Ten Thousand Bedrooms; Decision at Sundown; Blue Hawaii; and How to Frame a Figg.

== Television ==
Archer appeared in television series such as Rescue 8, Science Fiction Theatre, Armstrong Circle Theatre, Dick Powell's Zane Grey Theatre, and The Millionaire, The Loretta Young Show, Private Secretary, The Bob Cummings Show, Mackenzie's Raiders, This Man Dawson, The Adventures of Ozzie and Harriet, The Californians, Sea Hunt, Maverick (in the series' only 2-part episode, titled "The Devil's Necklace"), The Twilight Zone, The Tall Man, Surfside 6 with Van Williams, 77 Sunset Strip, Wagon Train, Bat Masterson, Hawaiian Eye, McHale's Navy, The Silent Service, Bonanza, Hazel, Mannix, and The Name of the Game.

In 1960 Archer was cast as Joe Holman in the episode "Phantom Trail" of the western series Colt .45. He made five guest appearances on Perry Mason. He played Frank Maddox in the show's second episode in 1957, "The Case of the Sleepwalker's Niece". In 1958 he played murder victim Maj. Frank Lessing in the episode "The Case of the Sardonic Sergeant", and in 1959 he played murderer J. R. Bradbury in the episode "The Case of the Lucky Legs". He also played murder victim Harry Arnold in the 1965 episode "The Case of Candy Queen". He also made seven guest appearances on Lassie and six on Bonanza. He played the outlaw Matt Grundy in a 1962 episode of Laramie, entitled "The Confederate Express".

== Personal life and death ==
Archer was married twice. From 1941 to 1955, he was married to actress Marjorie Lord. They had two children, including daughter actress Anne Archer. Archer had two children with his second wife, Ann Leddy, to whom he was married from 1956 until his death. Archer was a grandfather of Tommy Davis, son of his daughter Anne, both of whom are noted members of the Church of Scientology.

On December 3, 1999, Archer died from lung cancer in Redmond, Washington, at age 84.

== Selected filmography ==
- Flaming Frontiers (1938) - Tom Grant
- Letter of Introduction (1938) - Reporter (uncredited)
- Dick Tracy Returns (1938) - Mr. Clark (uncredited)
- Overland Stage Raiders (1938) - Bob Whitney
- Spring Madness (1938) - Dartmouth College Student (uncredited)
- Career (1939) - Ray Cruthers
- Curtain Call (1940) - Ted Palmer
- Barnyard Follies (1940) - Jeff Hill
- Cheers for Miss Bishop (1941) - Richard Clark
- Scattergood Baines (1941) - Johnny Bones
- City of Missing Girls (1941) - James Horton
- The People vs. Dr. Kildare (1941) - Interne (uncredited)
- King of the Zombies (1941) - Bill Summers
- Paper Bullets (1941) - Bob Elliott
- Mountain Moonlight (1941) - Dr. Ed
- Always Tomorrow: The Portrait of an American Business (1941) - Jim Westlake
- Hi, Neighbor (1942) - Dr. Hall
- Police Bullets (1942) - Prof. J. Thomas Quincy
- Mrs. Wiggs of the Cabbage Patch (1942) - Dr. Robert Redmond (uncredited)
- Scattergood Survives a Murder (1942) - Dunker Gilson
- Bowery at Midnight (1942) - Richard Dennison
- Hello, Frisco, Hello (1943) - Ned Clark
- The Purple V (1943) - Jimmy Thorne
- Sherlock Holmes in Washington (1943) - Lt. Pete Merriam
- Shantytown (1943) - Bill Allen
- Crash Dive (1943) - Curly Bowman (uncredited)
- Guadalcanal Diary (1943) - Lt. Thurmond
- The Eve of St. Mark (1944) - Pvt. Carter
- Roger Touhy, Gangster (1944) - FBI Agent Kerrigan
- The Lost Moment (1947) - Charles
- After Nightfall (1949)
- Colorado Territory (1949) - Reno Blake
- White Heat (1949) - Philip Evans
- Destination Moon (1950) - Jim Barnes
- The Great Jewel Robber (1950) - Police Detective Lou Sampter
- High Lonesome (1950) - Pat Farrell
- Santa Fe (1951) - Clint Canfield
- Home Town Story (1951) - Don (uncredited)
- Best of the Badmen (1951) - Curley Ringo
- My Favorite Spy (1951) - Henderson
- The Big Trees (1952) - Frenchy LeCroix
- Rodeo (1952) - Slim Martin
- A Yank in Indo-China (1952) - Mulvaney
- Sound Off (1952) - Maj. Paul Whiteside
- The Sea Tiger (1952) - Ben McGrun
- The Stars Are Singing (1953) - Dave Parish
- Dragon's Gold (1954) - Mack Rossiter
- No Man's Woman (1955) - Harlow Grant
- Rock Around the Clock (1956) - Mike Dodd
- Emergency Hospital (1956) - Dr. Herb Ellis
- Affair in Reno (1957) - Tony Lamarr
- She Devil (1957) - Barton Kendall
- 10,000 Bedrooms (1957) - Bob Dudley
- Decision at Sundown (1957) - Dr. John Storrow
- City of Fear (1959) - Lt. Mark Richards
- Blue Hawaii (1961) - Jack Kelman
- Apache Rifles (1964) - Col. Perry
- I Saw What You Did (1965) - John Austin
- How to Frame a Figg (1971) - Gerard
- The Little Sister (1986) - Warehouse Cop
