= Melody and Moonlight =

- Directed by: Joseph Santley
- Written by: Bradford Ropes
- Produced by: Robert North(associate producer)
- Starring: Jane Frazee; Johnny Downs; Vera Vague
- Cinematography: Ernest Miller
- Distributed by: Republic Pictures
- Release date: 1940
- Running time: 73 minutes
- Country: United States
- Language: English

Melody and Moonlight is a 1940 American film starring Jane Frazee.

== Plot ==
Kay Barnett is a free spirit, much like her aunt Adelaide, but such flamboyant behavior is disapproved of by Kay's father, Otis Barnett. He much prefers her to become a proper young lady and marry the dull but well-to-do Standish Prescott.

Kay and her aunt go to a dance hall, where Danny O'Brien mistakenly believes she is there for a dance contest. He pulls her into it and they take second prize. Danny also pays Kay's bill when she takes a room at a hotel where he works as a busboy, rescuing her when she has no money.

Danny and Kay decide to become a dance team but need a sponsor. They go to Aunt Adelaide's sweetheart, Abner Kelly, who agrees, but Otis Barnett gets wind of it, pressures Abner and scuttles the deal, frustrating Danny.

Ginger O'Brien, his little sister, befriends Kay and the family enjoys becoming acquainted with her, only to take umbrage when they discover Otis is her father and she's not who she seemed to be. Danny finds a new partner, but after Otis has a change of heart, Kay is rushed to the stage to become Danny's partner, then become his wife.

== Cast ==
- Jane Frazee as Kay Barnett
- Johnny Downs as Danny O'Brien
- Vera Vague as Adelaide
- Jerry Colonna as Abner
- Mary Lee as Ginger O'Brien
- Jonathan Hale as Otis
