= Olive Cooper =

American screenwriter

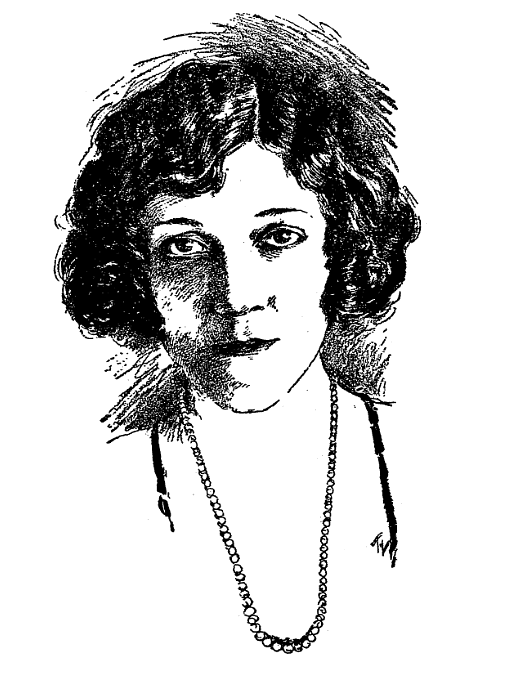
- Born: July 31, 1892; San Francisco, California, US
- Died: June 12, 1987 (aged 94); Los Angeles, California, US
- Occupations: Screenwriter, actress
- Relatives: George Stevens (nephew)

Olivette "Olive" Cooper (1892–1987) was a prolific American screenwriter known for movies like Cocoanut Grove, Bandit King of Texas and Three Little Sisters. She wrote many of the screenplays for Roy Rogers and Gene Autry vehicles.

== Biography ==
Cooper was born in San Francisco on July 31, 1892, to a well-known theatrical family. Her mother, Georgia Woodthorpe, was an actress, as was her sister, Georgie Cooper. Her nephew, George Stevens, went on to become a celebrated Hollywood director. Her brother Harry was a cinematographer.

She first appeared on stage at age 5, under the name Ollie Cooper, and performed in Bay Area theater productions before moving to Hollywood. She appeared chiefly in character roles and comedic parts. Her film debut was The Brass Check (1918). After appearing in a few short films in the early 1930s, she decided to pursue a career as a screenwriter. She wrote dozens of scripts over the course of her career, many of which were Westerns. She often collaborated with the directors Joseph Kane, Lew Landers and Joseph Santley. She was married to the stage director Edwin H. Curtis, and died in Los Angeles aged 94.

== Screenwriting credits ==
- Streamline Express (1935)
- Hot Tip (1935)
- Happy-Go-Lucky (1936)
- Navy Born (1936)
- Hearts in Bondage (1936)
- Laughing Irish Eyes (1936)
- The Return of Jimmy Valentine (1936)
- Dancing Feet (1936)
- Lady Behave! (1937)
- Rhythm in the Clouds (1937)
- Jim Hanvey, Detective (1937)
- Join the Marines (1937)
- The Mysterious Miss X (1939)
- Orphans of the Street (1938)
- Annabel Takes a Tour (1938)
- Cocoanut Grove (1938)
- She Married a Cop (1939)
- The Border Legion (1940)
- Young Bill Hickok (1940)
- Down Mexico Way (1941)
- Ice-Capades (1941)
- Sheriff of Tombstone (1941)
- The Singing Hill (1941)
- In Old Cheyenne (1941)
- The Great Train Robbery (1941)
- Call of the Canyon (1942)
- The Affairs of Jimmy Valentine (1942)
- Cowboy Serenade (1942)
- Nobody's Darling (1943)
- Shantytown (1943)
- King of the Cowboys (1943)
- Idaho (1943)
- Song of Nevada (1944)
- Three Little Sisters (1944)
- My Best Gal (1944)
- Sioux City Sue (1946)
- The Bamboo Blonde (1946)
- Swingin' on a Rainbow (1946)
- Bandit King of Texas (1949)
- Outcasts of the Trail (1949)
- The Big Sombrero (1949)
- Hills of Oklahoma (1950)
