= Redwood Forest Trail =

1950 film by Philip Ford

- Theatrical release poster
- Directed by: Philip Ford
- Screenplay by: Bradford Ropes
- Produced by: Franklin Adreon
- Starring: Rex Allen; Jeff Donnell; Carl Switzer; Jane Darwell; Marten Lamont; Pierre Watkin
- Cinematography: John MacBurnie
- Edited by: Harold Minter
- Music by: Stanley Wilson
- Production company: Republic Pictures
- Distributed by: Republic Pictures
- Release date: September 18, 1950
- Running time: 67 minutes
- Country: United States
- Language: English

Redwood Forest Trail is a 1950 American Western film directed by Philip Ford, written by Bradford Ropes and starring Rex Allen. The film was released on September 18, 1950 by Republic Pictures.

== Cast ==
- Rex Allen as Rex Allen
- Jeff Donnell as Julie Westcott
- Carl Switzer as Sidekick Alfie
- Jane Darwell as Hattie Hickory
- Marten Lamont as Craig Danvers
- Pierre Watkin as Arthur Cameron
- Jimmy Ogg as Two Bits
- Dickie Jones as Mighty Mite
- John L. Cason as Henchman Curley
- Jim Frasher as Wyomin'
- Bobby Larson as Chips
- Ward Wood as Henchman Matt Mason
- Jack Larson as Dusty
- Ted Fries as Hawk
- Joseph Granby as Bart Bryant
- Bob Burns as Sam Westcott
