= Rancho Grande (film) =

- Theatrical release poster
- Directed by: Frank McDonald
- Screenplay by: Bradford Ropes; Betty Burbridge; Peter Milne
- Story by: Peter Milne; Connie Lee
- Produced by: William Berke
- Starring: Gene Autry; Smiley Burnette; June Storey
- Cinematography: William Nobles
- Edited by: Tony Martinelli
- Production company: Republic Pictures
- Distributed by: Republic Pictures
- Release date: March 22, 1940 (USA)
- Running time: 67 minutes
- Country: United States
- Language: English
- Budget: $76,573

Rancho Grande is a 1940 American Western film directed by Frank McDonald and starring Gene Autry, Smiley Burnette, and June Storey. Written by Bradford Ropes, Betty Burbridge, and Peter Milne, based on a story by Peter Milne and Connie Lee, the film is about a singing cowboy and ranch foreman responsible for completing an important irrigation project and for the three spoiled grandchildren of his former boss who come out West to the ranch they inherited.

== Plot ==
Following the death of rancher John Dodge, foreman Gene Autry (Gene Autry) is left the responsibility of taking care of Rancho Grande ranch and Dodge's three spoiled grandchildren raised in the east. Gene is also responsible for completing a major project started by Dodge—the construction of an irrigation system that would bring valuable water to the faithful Rancho Grande employees in the southern part of the valley. Dodge mortgaged his ranch in order to finance the project.

When Dodge's grandchildren, Tom (Dick Hogan), Kay (June Storey), and Patsy (Mary Lee), arrive from the east, they are unimpressed with life on the ranch. Tom and Kay are madcap college types who think ranchlife is boring and long to return to the big city. They resent Gene's authority and dismiss his talk of developing a work ethic and the importance of the irrigation project. Meanwhile, crooked lawyer Emory Benson (Ferris Taylor) is planning to seize the mortgage to Rancho Grande. After meeting Tom and Kay, he decides to take advantage of their discontent in order to slow the irrigation project and prevent the bank from renewing the mortgage.

Gradually, Gene is able to win Kay over to his way of thinking, but Tom falls in with a group of partying tenderfoots from the east. He invites them to stay at Rancho Grande, where they get in everyone's way. Gene and his sidekick Frog Millhouse (Smiley Burnette) finally succeed in scaring the dudes off the ranch. Angered by Gene's actions, Tom and Kay decide to leave. When a rockslide at the irrigation project site injures Jose, a faithful Rancho Grande employee, Tom and Kay come to their senses and pledge to help complete the project on time.

Continuing his plan of terror, Benson dynamites a train carrying the pipe needed to complete the project. When Gene and his men ride to salvage the pipe, Benson and his gang are waiting for a showdown. In the gunfight that ensues, Gene captures Benson and his gang, insuring the timely completion of the irrigation project and the grandchildren's continued ownership of Rancho Grande.

== Cast ==
- Gene Autry as Gene Autry
- Smiley Burnette as Frog Millhouse
- June Storey as Kay Dodge
- Mary Lee as Patsy Dodge
- Dick Hogan as Tom Dodge
- Ellen Lowe as Effie Tinker
- Ferris Taylor as Emery Benson
- Joe De Stefani as Jose
- Roscoe Ates as Ranch Hand Complaining about Tuxedo
- Rex Lease as Joe Travis
- Ann Baldwin as Susan Putnam
- Pals of the Golden West as Musicians
- Boys' Choir of St. Joseph's School as Church Choir
- Chuck Baldra as Ranch Hand Bill (uncredited)
- Roy Barcroft as Madden (uncredited)
- Horace B. Carpenter as Justice of the Peace
- Jack Ingram as Adams, the Construction Boss
- Pee Wee King as Bandleader of The Pals of the Golden West
- Slim Whitaker as Cowboy Who Announces Wreck
- Champion as Gene's Horse (uncredited)

== Production ==
=== Casting ===
Actor Dick Hogan was loaned out to Republic Pictures by RKO at $250 a week. Hogan specialized in youthful roles.

=== Filming and budget ===
Rancho Grande was filmed February 7–21, 1940. The film had an operating budget of $76,573 (equal to $1,759,724 today).

=== Stuntwork ===
- Joe Yrigoyen (Gene Autry's stunt double)
- Jack Kirk (Smiley Burnette's stunt double)
- Nellie Walker (June Storey's stunt double)
- Eddie Parker
- Bill Yrigoyen

=== Filming locations ===
- Bronson Canyon, Griffith Park, 4730 Crystal Springs Drive, Los Angeles, California, USA
- Train tunnel beneath Topanga Canyon Road just south of Santa Susana Pass Road
- Janss Ranch in Thousand Oaks
- Iverson Ranch - 1 Iverson Lane, Chatsworth, Los Angeles, California, USA
- Monogram Ranch - 24715 Oak Creek Avenue, Newhall, California, USA

=== Soundtrack ===
- "Alla en el Rancho Grande" (Emilio D. Uranga, Jorge del Moral, Silvano Ramos, Bartley Costello) by The Brewer Kids and Gene Autry in Spanish
- "Alla en el Rancho Grande" by Smiley Burnette a cappella
- "Alla en el Rancho Grande" by Gene Autry, Smiley Burnette, Mary Lee, Pals of the Golden West and ranch hands
- "Alla en el Rancho Grande" by the band at the nightclub
- "Whistle" (Gene Autry, Johnny Marvin, Fred Rose) by Mary Lee, Gene Autry, and Pals of the Golden West
- "Dude Ranch Cow Hands" (Gene Autry, Fred Rose, Johnny Marvin) by Gene Autry, Smiley Burnette, and Pals of the Golden West with Roscoe Ates on violin
- "Swing of the Range" (Harry Tobias, Johnny Marvin) by Mary Lee and ranch hands, danced by Hank Worden, Frankie Marvin, Hank Bell, Bill Wolfe, and others
- "Swing of the Range" by Mary Lee a cappella
- "There'll Never Be Another Pal Like You" (Gene Autry, Johnny Marvin, Harry Tobias) by Gene Autry and Smiley Burnette
- "Ave Maria, Op.52 No.6" (Franz Schubert) by Boys' Choir of St. Joseph's School
- "I Don't Belong in Your World" (Gene Autry, Johnny Marvin, Fred Rose) by Gene Autry
- "You Can Take the Boy Out of the Country" (Smiley Burnette) by Smiley Burnette
- "Oh! Susanna" (Stephen Foster) by friends of Kay and Tom Dodge
- "Belles of the Bunkhouse" (Walter G. Samuels)
