= Shantytown (film) =

1943 film by Joseph Santley

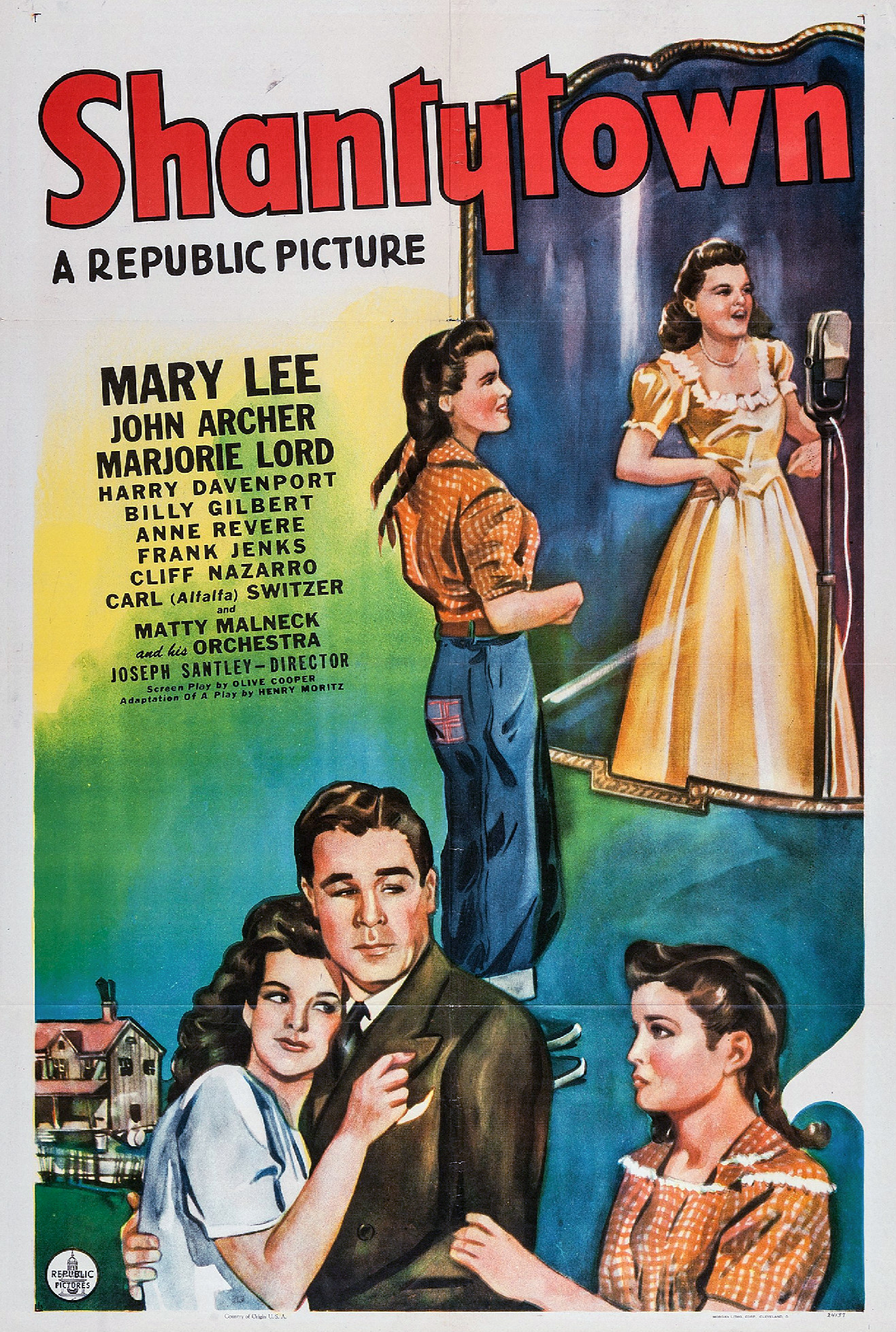
- Theatrical release poster
- Directed by: Joseph Santley
- Screenplay by: Olive Cooper
- Produced by: Harry Grey
- Starring: Mary Lee; John Archer; Marjorie Lord; Harry Davenport; Billy Gilbert; Anne Revere
- Cinematography: Ernest Miller
- Edited by: Thomas Richards
- Music by: Walter Scharf
- Production company: Republic Pictures
- Distributed by: Republic Pictures
- Release date: April 20, 1943
- Running time: 66 minutes
- Country: United States
- Language: English

Shantytown is a 1943 American crime film directed by Joseph Santley and written by Olive Cooper. The film stars Mary Lee, John Archer, Marjorie Lord, Harry Davenport, Billy Gilbert and Anne Revere. The film was released on April 20, 1943, by Republic Pictures.

== Plot ==
Liz Gorty, the daughter of the owners of a boarding house, takes a liking to a new married mechanic in town, Bill Allen. He gets mixed up with a gang of thieves who force him to drive a getaway car in a robbery. Knowing he has been framed, Bill goes into hiding and Liz uses her job at a radio station to get messages to him.

== Cast ==
- Mary Lee as Elizabeth 'Liz' Gorty
- John Archer as Bill Allen
- Marjorie Lord as Virginia Allen
- Harry Davenport as 'Doc' Herndon
- Billy Gilbert as 'Papa' Ferrelli
- Anne Revere as Mrs. Gorty
- John F. Hamilton as Mr. Gorty
- Frank Jenks as 'Whitey'
- Cliff Nazarro as 'Shortcake'
- Carl Switzer as 'Bindy'
- Robert Homans as Dugan
- Noel Madison as 'Ace' Lambert
- Matty Malneck as Orchestra Leader
- Matty Malneck's Orchestra as Orchestra
