= Barnyard Follies =

1940 film by Frank McDonald

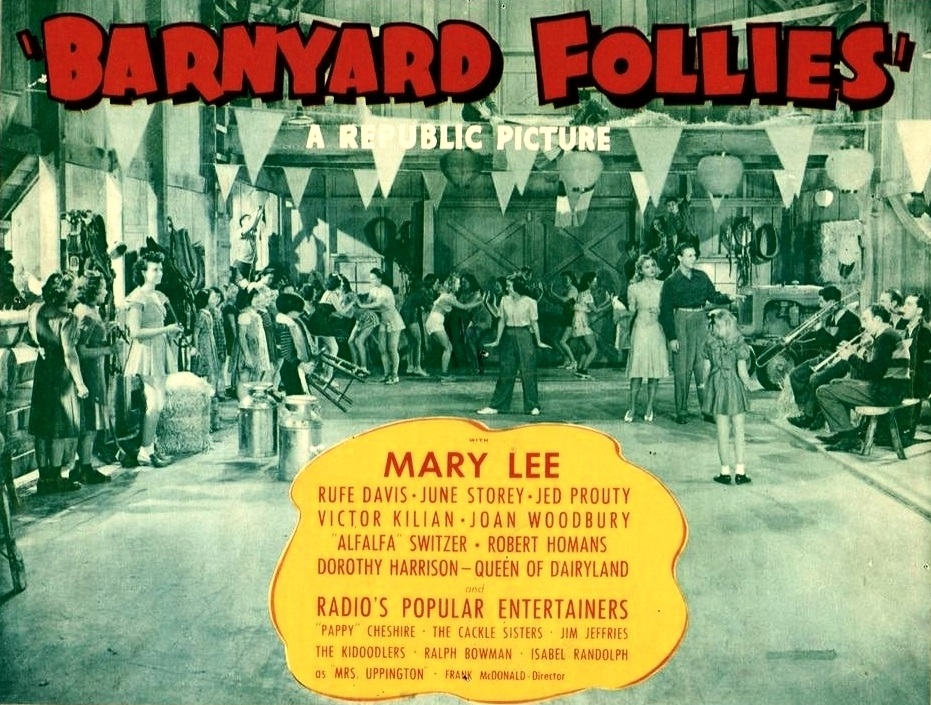
- Original 1940 lobby card
- Directed by: Frank McDonald
- Screenplay by: Dorrell McGowan; Stuart E. McGowan
- Story by: Robert T. Shannon
- Produced by: Armand Schaefer; Al Wilson, production manager
- Starring: Mary Lee; Rufe Davis; Harry Cheshire; June Storey; Ralph Bowman; Joan Woodbury; Jed Prouty; Victor Kilian; Isabel Randolph
- Cinematography: Ernest Miller
- Edited by: Murray Seldeen, supervising editor Charles Craft, film editor
- Music by: Cy Feuer, music director William Lava (uncredited); Paul Sawtell (uncredited); Josephine Earl, choreographer
- Production company: Republic Pictures
- Distributed by: Republic Pictures
- Release date: October 6, 1940
- Running time: 68.5 minutes
- Country: United States
- Language: English

Barnyard Follies is a 1940 Republic Pictures musical B movie directed by Frank McDonald with music directed by Cy Feuer and dance choreography by Josephine Earl. In the rural American West, a small-town orphanage struggles to become self-supporting through its 4-H Club projects. The screenplay, written by Dorrell McGowan and Stuart E. McGowan, is based on a story concept by Robert T. Shannon. Released on October 6, 1940, the film stars Mary Lee, Harry Cheshire, Rufe Davis, June Storey, Ralph Bowman, Joan Woodbury, Jed Prouty, Victor Kilian and Isabel Randolph.

== Plot ==
Pappy Cheshire, his assistant Louise Dale and farmhand Bucksaw Beechwood manage an orphanage near the village of Farmdale. Pappy has loaned $5,000 of community-provided funding to the orphans for their new 4-H Club projects so that the orphanage will become self-supporting. Believing this to be a ridiculous idea, community leaders Hiram Crabtree, Sam Spitz and Mrs. Uppington pressure Pappy to return the money within 30 days.

Hearing on the radio that Pappy's long-lost brother Henry has died and left Pappy $20,000, Bubbles Martin, one of the teenage orphan girls, tells Pappy about his good fortune. The inheritance includes the Peep Inn, a nightclub that Pappy and Bubbles visit in the city. Pappy plans to close the club, sell the building and use the proceeds for the orphanage. He approaches the Peep Inn's group of musicians, dancers and their director Jeff Hill to settle their contracts for their release. The entertainers refuse the offer and Pappy insists that they come to Farmdale to work for him for the remainder of their contract.

When Jeff and his troupe arrive at the orphanage, he is immediately smitten with Louise but she gives him the cold shoulder. Receiving a check for only $900 from his brother's estate after taxes and expenses, Pappy is unable to pay back the community. Jeff wants to stage a show called the Barnyard Follies to earn enough money to solve the financial problem, but Dolly and the other dancers quit when they learn of the plan. Bubbles convinces the orphans to do the show with the help of Jeff.

The fire inspector prevents the show from taking place. Under pressure from Hiram and Sam, Pappy leaves the orphanage. A haystack goes up in flames, and a fire truck becomes stuck on the bridge in the driveway at the orphanage. With the entire fire department now at the orphanage waiting for the fire truck to be freed, the mayor of Farmdale allows the show to proceed. Pappy returns when he hears on the radio that the orphans' 4-H Club animals are to be auctioned. Mrs. Uppington accuses Hiram and Sam of political graft as their motive for driving Pappy to leave. Hiram and Sam flee the scene. Jeff and Louise are arm in arm by the end of the film.

== Cast ==
Clockwise from upper left: Harry Cheshire, Rufe Davis, Mary Lee Wooters, unidentified boy, Norma Jean Wooters, unidentified girl.

- Mary Lee (Mary Lee Wooters) as Bubbles Martin
- Rufe Davis (Rufus Davidson) as Bucksaw Beechwood
- June Storey as Louise Dale
- Jed Prouty as Sam Spitz
- Victor Kilian as Hiram Crabtree
- Joan Woodbury as Dolly
- Carl Switzer as Alfalfa
- Robert Homans as Fire Inspector
- Dorothy Harrison as Queen of Dairyland
- "Pappy" Cheshire (Harry Cheshire) as Pappy Cheshire
- The Cackle Sisters (Mary Jane and Carolyn DeZurik, a.k.a. The DeZurik Sisters) as the Cackle Sisters
- Jim Jeffries (James J. Jeffries) as Jimmy Jeffries, the radio announcer and auctioneer
- The Kidoodlers (Bill Kearns, Paul Cordner, Bob Remington, and Ed Lewis) as the Kidoodlers
- Ralph Bowman (a.k.a. John Archer) as Jeff Hill
- Isabel Randolph as Mrs. Uppington ("Uppy")

Wooters was 15 and in her first leading role and eighth screen appearance. Her 11-year-old sister Norma Jean appears in an uncredited role as an orphan girl.

Lillian Randolph also appears in an uncredited role in the film's opening scene at 3:25.

Barnyard Follies drew on cast members who had been recently dropped from Hal Roach's Our Gang series of comedy shorts, such as Carl "Alfalfa" Switzer.

== Soundtrack ==
- "I'd Love to Be a Cowboy (But I'm Afraid of Cows)"
- "Home on the Range"
- "Lollipop Lane"
- "Big Boy Blues"
- "Mama Don't Allow It"
- "To the Concert We Will Go"
- "Poppin' the Corn"
- "Barnyard Holiday"
