= Carol Adams (actress) =

American actress and dancer (1918–2012)

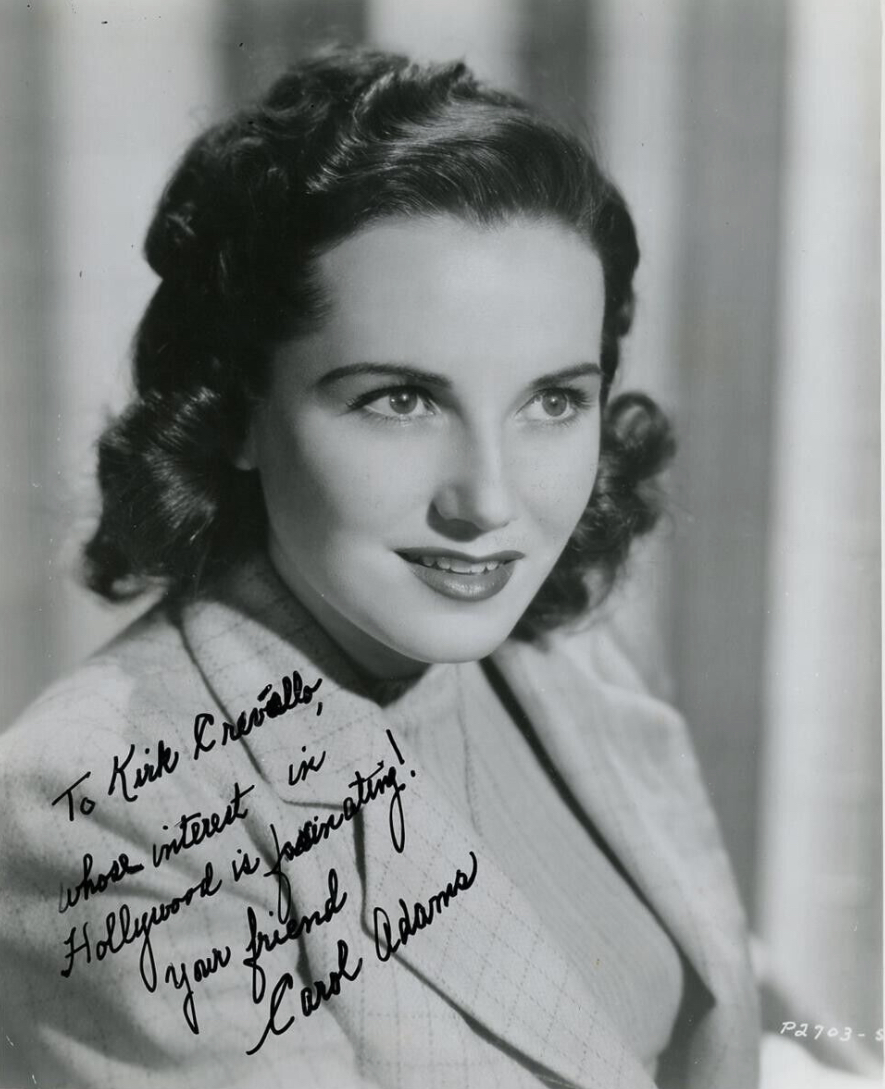
- Adams in 1940
- Born: Lurline Uller; March 15, 1918; Los Angeles, California, U.S.
- Died: April 9, 2012 (aged 94); Los Angeles, California, U.S.
- Other name: Lurline Pearl
- Occupations: Actress; dancer
- Years active: 1923–1957

Carol Adams (born Lurline Uller; March 15, 1918 – April 9, 2012) was an American actress and dancer. She began her career performing under her birth name at the age of five in the short film Navy Blues (1923). In the 1920s, she made appearances in the short film series Our Gang, Buster Brown, and Mickey McGuire, and also appeared in minor uncredited film roles. From 1936-1939, she was under contract with 20th Century Fox, where she appeared in dance parts and uncredited roles. She first drew critical notice for her work as a tap dancer in the 1938 Fox film Sally, Irene and Mary. In 1940, she joined Paramount Pictures at which time her performance name was changed to Carol Adams. Beginning with the film Dancing on a Dime (1940) she worked as a leading actress in Hollywood until her retirement in 1944 at the time of her marriage to studio executive Richard J. Pearl.

== Early life as a child perfomer ==
Adams was born Lurline Uller in Los Angeles, California, March 15, 1918. Her parents were Mr. and Mrs. Emil Uller. She trained with The Meglin Kiddies and in her early career she was billed under her birth name. At age five, she was asked to appear in a short subject called Navy Blues (1923) where she played a flower girl. After appearing in this film she appeared in small uncredited parts in Sparrows (1926) and Fireman, Save My Child (1927). She also made appearances as a child actress in the comedy short film series Our Gang, Buster Brown, and Mickey McGuire. In her early childhood she attended the school at the film studio where she was working with other child actors.

In 1928, at the age of 10, Uller traveled to New York to study acting, and was enrolled in the Sophie J. Mee School in Mount Vernon, New York. She was back in Los Angeles in 1929 performing with Judy Garland (then Francis Gumm) in a group called the Hollywood Starlets. In 1931 she portrayed Ruth in a production of Gilbert and Sullivan's The Pirates of Penzance with the Hollywood Junior Light Opera Guild; a company in Los Angeles that used actors all younger than 16. She graduated form George Washington Preparatory High School in Los Angeles. She later attended Los Angeles City College.

== Adult dancer and actress ==
At the age of 18, Uller signed a contract with the film studio 20th Century Fox. With Fox she appeared as a dancer or in uncredited minor roles from 1936 through 1939; in films like The Big Broadcast of 1938 and Rose of Washington Square (1939). She drew strong critical notice for her uncredited work in the film Sally, Irene and Mary (1938), with one critic pointing to her featured work in the tap dancing musical number "Minuet in Jazz" as a highlight of the picture. The reviews from this film led to her being offered a better contract at Fox by Darryl F. Zanuck, boosting her out of anonymity.

In February 1940, Uller starred in the musical revue Hit and Run at the Mayan Theater which was produced and directed by Kurt Robitschek. Her strong performance in this show drew the attention of scouts from Paramount Pictures, and she was put under contract with them in March 1940. At that time it was announced in the press that Uller's name would be changed to Carol Adams beginning with her performance in the film Dancing on a Dime (1940). She next worked under contract with Republic Pictures (RP). She had larger credited roles in the 1941 RP films Ice-Capades, Sis Hopkins, and Ridin' on a Rainbow; the latter made with Gene Autry.

Her obituary in Variety said that she "appeared in some 50 features". Regarded as one of the foremost tap dance stars in the beginning of the 1940s, she was in many Soundies.

== Personal life and death ==
In 1944, Adams retired after marrying studio executive Richard J. Pearl.

Adams died in Los Angeles on April 9, 2012, at the age of 94. She was survived by a son, a daughter, six granddaughters, and seven great-grandchildren. Adams was remembered as an actress "who appeared in some 50 features, starring at times with Gene Autry and Roy Rogers."

== Selected filmography ==
- In Old Chicago (1937)
- New Faces of 1937 (1937)
- The Life of the Party (1937)
- Love and Hisses (1937)
- The Big Broadcast of 1938 (1938)
- Keep Smiling (1938)
- Sally, Irene and Mary (1938)
- Rose of Washington Square (1939)
- The House Across the Bay (1940)
- The Quarterback (1940)
- Dancing on a Dime (1940)
- Love Thy Neighbor (1940)
- Behind the News (1940)
- Ridin' on a Rainbow (1941)
- Sis Hopkins (1941)
- The Gay Vagabond (1941)
- Ice-Capades (1941)
- Bad Man of Deadwood (1941)
- Dick Tracy vs. Crime Inc. (1941)
- Blondie Goes to College (1942)
- Ever Since Venus (1944)
