= Ride, Tenderfoot, Ride =

- Theatrical release poster
- Directed by: Frank McDonald
- Screenplay by: Winston Miller
- Story by: Betty Burbridge; Connie Lee
- Produced by: William Berke
- Starring: Gene Autry; Smiley Burnette; June Storey
- Cinematography: Jack A. Marta
- Edited by: Lester Orlebeck
- Music by: Raoul Kraushaar (supervisor)
- Production company: Republic Pictures
- Distributed by: Republic Pictures
- Release date: September 6, 1940 (U.S.)
- Running time: 65 minutes
- Country: United States
- Language: English
- Budget: $74,965

Ride, Tenderfoot, Ride is a 1940 American Western film directed by Frank McDonald and starring Gene Autry, Smiley Burnette, and June Storey. Written by Winston Miller, based on a story by Betty Burbridge and Connie Lee, the film is about a singing cowboy who inherits a meat-packing plant and must face stiff competition from a beautiful business rival.

== Plot ==
Singing cowboy Gene Autry (Gene Autry) and his sidekick Frog Millhouse (Smiley Burnette) work on a ranch owned by Ann Randolph (June Storey). Gene is unaware that he has just inherited the Belmont Packing Company. While Gene and Frog take the cattle to market, Gene has an argument with Ann who fires them both, giving them one of the steers as back pay. Later the local sheriff, seeing a Randolph steer in the possession of the two cowboys, arrests Gene and Frog on suspicion of cattle rustling. Attorney Henry Walker (Forbes Murray), who has been searching for the singing cowboy, finally locates Gene at the jail and informs him of his inheritance.

After being released from jail, Gene takes possession of the Belmont Packing Company. Ann, who owns a rival packing company, had plans to merge the two companies under her ownership. Now she is dismayed to learn that the man she just fired is now her main business competitor. Ann's conniving general manager and fiancé, Donald Gregory (Warren Hull), convinces her to feign romantic interest in Gene and sweet talk him into selling his company to her. At first the plan appears to work, and Gene agrees to Ann's offer and signs a contract of sale. Later, when he learns that Gregory plans to close the plant putting all his employees out of work, Gene tears up the contract and decides to stay in the packing business.

Gene soon learns that his biggest business challenge is having enough cattle to fill the distribution demands. He initiates a campaign to convince the ranchers to sell their stock to his Belmont Packing Company, and soon the contracts start coming in. Ann responds with her campaign, however, appealing to ranchers with a "helpless woman" routine. When he notices her success, Gene changes tactics and starts a new campaign, singing to the ranchers and organizing parades to win their business, and the campaign succeeds.

Unable to compete with legitimate business approaches, Gregory orders his men to use violence to stop the singing cowboy. Ann's little sister Patsy (Mary Lee), who has a crush on Gene, overhears Gregory's men plotting to dynamite the dam and flood the valley. After she warns Gene of Gregory's scheme, Gene rides off and intercepts Gregory's henchmen before they can plant their explosives. Soon after, Gregory is indicted for sabotage, and Gene and Ann form a business alliance as well as a romantic relationship.

== Cast ==
- Gene Autry as Gene Autry
- Smiley Burnette as Frog Millhouse
- June Storey as Ann Randolph
- Mary Lee as Patsy Randolph
- Warren Hull as Donald Gregory
- Forbes Murray as Attorney Henry Walker
- Joe McGuinn as Henchman Martin
- Joe Frisco as Haberdasher
- Isabel Randolph as Miss Spencer
- Herbert Clifton as Butler Andrews
- Mildred Shay as Stewardess
- Si Jenks as Sheriff
- Cindy Walker as Singer with The Pacemakers
- The Pacemakers as Singers
- Slim Whitaker as Rancher (uncredited)
- Champion as Gene's Horse (uncredited)

== Production ==
=== Filming and budget ===
Ride, Tenderfoot, Ride was filmed June 28 to July 12, 1940. The film had an operating budget of $74,965 (equal to $1,722,770 today), and a negative cost of $74,443.

=== Stuntwork ===
- Joe Yrigoyen (Gene Autry's stunt double)
- Jack Kirk (Smiley Burnette's stunt double)
- Nellie Walker (June Storey's stunt double)

=== Filming locations ===
- Chatsworth Railroad Station, Chatsworth, Los Angeles, California, USA
- Corriganville Movie Ranch, Simi Valley, California, USA
- Agoura Ranch
- Lake Hemet, Riverside County, California, USA
- Palmdale, California, USA

=== Soundtrack ===
- "Ride, Tenderfoot, Ride" (Richard A. Whiting, Johnny Mercer) by Mary Lee
- "Ride, Tenderfoot, Ride" by Gene Autry, Mary Lee, and June Storey
- "When the Work's All Done This Fall" (D.J. O'Malley) by Gene Autry
- "Eleven More Months and Ten More Days" (Fred Hall, Arthur Fields) by Gene Autry and Smiley Burnette in jail
- "Woodpecker Song" (Eldo Di Lazzaro, Bruno Cherubini, Harold Adamson) by Gene Autry and Mary Lee
- "That Was Me by the Sea" (Smiley Burnette) by Smiley Burnette
- "Leanin' on the Ole Top Rail" (Charles Kenny, Nick Kenny) by Gene Autry
- "Oh! Oh! Oh!" (Gene Autry, Johnny Marvin) by Cindy Walker, Mary Lee with The Pacemakers and Others
- "On the Range" (Gene Autry, Johnny Marvin) by Gene Autry and Cowhands
