= Angels with Broken Wings =

1941 film by Bernard Vorhaus

- Directed by: Bernard Vorhaus
- Screenplay by: George Carleton Brown; Bradford Ropes
- Story by: George Carleton Brown
- Produced by: Albert J. Cohen
- Starring: Jane Frazee; Binnie Barnes; Gilbert Roland
- Production company: Republic Pictures
- Distributed by: Republic Pictures
- Release date: May 27, 1941
- Running time: 72 minutes
- Country: United States
- Language: English

Angels with Broken Wings is a 1941 American comedy film directed by Bernard Vorhaus and starring Jane Frazee and Binnie Barnes. The screenplay was written by George Carleton Brown and Bradford Ropes. It was released by Republic Pictures.

== Cast ==
- Binnie Barnes as Sybil Barton
- Gilbert Roland as Don Pablo Vincente
- Mary Lee as Mary Wilson
- Billy Gilbert as Billy Wilson
- Jane Frazee as Jane Lord
- Edward Norris as Steve Wilson
- Leo Gorcey as Punchy Dorsey
