= Nobody's Darling =

1943 American musical film directed by Anthony Mann

- Theatrical release poster
- Directed by: Anthony Mann
- Screenplay by: Olive Cooper
- Story by: F. Hugh Herbert
- Produced by: Harry Grey
- Starring: Mary Lee; Louis Calhern; Gladys George; Jackie Moran; Lee Patrick; Benny Bartlett
- Cinematography: Jack A. Marta
- Edited by: Ernest J. Nims
- Music by: Walter Scharf; Marlin Skiles
- Production company: Republic Pictures
- Distributed by: Republic Pictures
- Release date: August 27, 1943
- Running time: 71 minutes
- Country: United States
- Language: English

Nobody's Darling is a 1943 American musical film directed by Anthony Mann and written by Olive Cooper. The film stars Mary Lee, Louis Calhern, Gladys George, Jackie Moran, Lee Patrick and Benny Bartlett. The film was released on August 27, 1943, by Republic Pictures.

== Plot ==
Husband-and-wife acting team Curtis and Eve Farnsworth have a daughter, Janie, who attends a very exclusive boarding school. Janie is frustrated because her parents pay more attention to acting than to her and because Chuck Grant, in charge of the school's upcoming musical production, tells Janie she can't act, can't dance and isn't glamorous enough to be in the show.

Janie eventually becomes aware that her father's career is flourishing but her mother's is not. Rather than accept roles opposite a younger co-star, Curtis decides to retire without telling his wife why. Janie, meanwhile, ignored by her parents but encouraged by principal Miss Pennington, turns out to be a very good singer, so now Chuck does want her to perform.

Confusion reigns when word is falsely spread that Janie and Chuck are also romantically involved. Their angry parents come to the school to withdraw them. Pennington persuades them to wait until the show, and when they finally see how talented Janie is, everybody ends up happy.

== Cast ==
- Mary Lee as Janie Farnsworth
- Louis Calhern as Curtis Farnsworth
- Gladys George as Eve Hawthorne
- Jackie Moran as Charles Grant Jr.
- Lee Patrick as Miss Pennington
- Benny Bartlett as Julius aka The Deacon
- Marcia Mae Jones as Lois
- Roberta Smith as Texas Gleason
- Lloyd Corrigan as Charles Grant Sr.
- Jonathan Hale as Jason Rhodes
- Sylvia Field as Miss Campbell
- Billy Dawson as Jerry Hoke
- Beverly Boyd as Corabelle Fiefield
- Syd Saylor as Reporter (uncredited)
