= Mary Lee (actress) =

American actress and singer

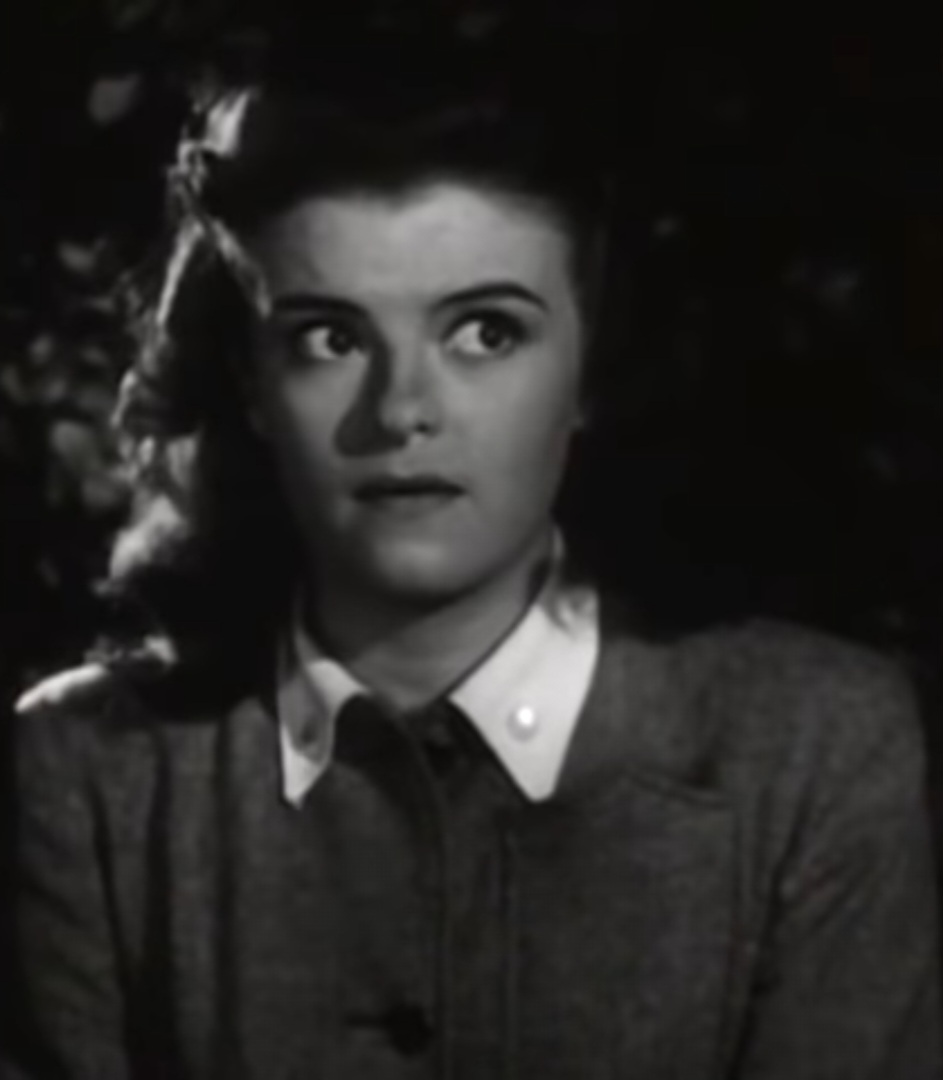
- Lee in Cowboy and the Senorita (1944)
- Born: Mary Lee Wooters; October 24, 1924; Centralia, Illinois, U.S.
- Died: June 6, 1996 (aged 71); Sacramento, California, U.S.
- Resting place: Sierra Hills Memorial Park, Sacramento, California
- Occupations: Big band singer; film actress
- Known for: Cowboy and the Senorita; Ridin' on a Rainbow; Angels with Broken Wings; Carolina Moon; Nancy Drew... Reporter; Melody Ranch
- Spouse(s): Harry Banan, Jr.(1943-1990} (his death, 2 children)

Mary Lee (October 24, 1924 – June 6, 1996) was a big band singer and B movie actress from the late 1930s into the 1940s, appearing mostly in Westerns. She did not make any screen appearances after 1944.

== Early years ==
Lee was born Mary Lee Wooters in Centralia, Illinois, on October 24, 1924. Her mother and father were Lela Myrtle Telford and Louis Ellis Wooters. They had four daughters, Vera Mae, Dorris Lucille, Mary Lee, and Norma Jean. Dorris Lucille died shortly after birth in 1923. When Mary Lee was four years old, the family moved to Ottawa, Illinois, where Louis Wooters opened a barbershop. At age six, Mary Lee began singing with her father and older sister Vera, who were already performing country and popular songs over a low power radio station and at various events in the LaSalle County, Illinois, area.

== Personal life ==
In Ottawa, Illinois, Mary Lee attended Lincoln Elementary School, graduating from the eighth grade in 1938. In late 1939 or early 1940 the Wooters family moved from Ottawa to Los Angeles. There Mary Lee attended Mar-Ken School, a private school in Hollywood for professional children. As a junior she was elected secretary of the student body. She graduated from Mar-Ken in 1942. On November 12, 1943, Wooters married Harry J. Banan, First Sergeant, United States Army, who had recently returned from World War II service at Guadalcanal, to whom she would remain married until his death in 1990. Together they had two children, Harry Philip and Laura Lee. In the late 1950s through the 1960s, the Banans resided in Pullman, Washington where M.Sgt. Harry J. Banan was an Army ROTC instructor at Washington State University. Later, after they returned to California, Mary Lee was an account teller at Bank of America where she worked for 15 years. She died in 1996 at 71 and is interred in Sierra Hills Memorial Park in Sacramento, California.

== Music ==
In mid-June 1938, Lee joined the Ted Weems Orchestra, traveling with the group four months a year, accompanied by either her mother or her older sister as companion and teacher. She recorded five sides with the Weems band including "Back to Smokey Mountain", a duet with Elmo Tanner from an October 5, 1939 session, issued as Decca 2829-B. In the summer of 1942, Lee recorded eight tracks in two sessions with Bob Crosby's Bob Cats, reissued in Australia on Swaggie CD 504 as Bob Crosby's Bob Cats – Volume Four 1941–1942.

Decades later a review of Varèse Sarabande CD VSD-5910 / Gene Autry With His Little Darlin' Mary Lee in the trade publication Billboard described Lee as a "clear-voiced, expressive singer", noting that she was "heralded as Republic's answer to MGM's Judy Garland." The CD, released in 1998, is a compilation of songs from Lee's appearances in Gene Autry films including "Give Out With a Song" from Gaucho Serenade (May 10, 1940) and "Sing A Song Of Laughter" from Ridin' on a Rainbow (June 24, 1941).

== Film ==
Lee's first screen appearance was with Warner Bros., in Nancy Drew... Reporter, released February 18, 1939, where she portrayed Mary Nickerson, the younger sister of Nancy Drew's (Bonita Granville) boyfriend, Ted Nickerson (Frank Thomas Jr.). The film used her vocal talents in the "Nursery Rhyme Medley". In the fall of 1939, Mary Lee accepted a job at Republic Pictures where she starred alongside Gene Autry and June Storey in South of the Border (15 December 1939). Republic signed her to a five-year contract in June 1940. She starred in a total of nine Autry films, the first five of those with June Storey, always playing the leading lady's younger sister "Patsy" except in Melody Ranch (15 November 1940) where her character's name was "Penny". Mary Lee's last appearance in an Autry film was in The Singing Hill (26 April 1941) with Virginia Dale. She also appeared in nine additional Republic feature films, including Barnyard Follies in 1940 with June Storey and younger sister Norma Jean Wooters and two Roy Rogers films in 1944, plus three of Republic's "Meet the Stars" shorts.

Her other films included Rancho Grande, Ride, Tenderfoot, Ride, Sing, Dance, Plenty Hot, Carolina Moon and Gaucho Serenade.

"Nobody's Darling" is a 1943 American musical film directed by Anthony Mann and written by Olive Cooper. The film stars Mary Lee (as Janie Farnsworth), Louis Calhern, Gladys George, Jackie Moran, Lee Patrick and Benny Bartlett. The film was released on August 27, 1943, by Republic Pictures

== World War II ==
Gene Autry enlisted in July 1942 in the U.S. Army Air Corps, where he would serve for the duration of the war plus six months. With Autry unavailable, Republic soon billed Mary Lee as "America's Little Sister" and starred her in B musicals Shantytown (20 April 1943), Nobody's Darling (27 August 1943), and Three Little Sisters (31 July 1944) in addition to giving her starring roles in the two Roy Rogers films. In her first Rogers film, Cowboy and the Senorita (13 May 1944), Roy's first picture with Dale Evans, Mary Lee was given second billing above Dale and is featured in the film's elaborate musical productions. There, with the Sons of the Pioneers (Ken Carson, Karl Farr, Bob Nolan, Tim Spencer, and Hugh Farr), Mary Lee sings "She Wore a Yellow Ribbon". In the finale, Dale Evans, Mary Lee, and Roy Rogers sing "Enchilada Man" and "Cowboy and the Senorita" with the Sons of the Pioneers. Then, in Song of Nevada (5 August 1944), Mary Lee's last screen appearance, backed by the Sons of the Pioneers, she sings "The Wigwam Song", written by Glenn Spencer, and reprises it in the Song of Nevada Finale. Compare Mary Lee's height there at age nineteen to that of Dale Evans who was 5 feet 4 inches (1.63 m) tall.

Having married in 1943, with a child born in November 1944, and her five-year contract at Republic Pictures running out in February 1945, Lee did not re-sign with Republic Pictures but may have done some further work with Ted Weems.

== Filmography ==
=== Film ===
Year	Film	Role	Notes
1939	Nancy Drew... Reporter	Mary Nickerson	
1939	South of the Border	Patsy	
1940	Rancho Grande	Patsy Dodge	
1940	Gaucho Serenade	Patsy Holloway	
1940	Carolina Moon	Patsy Stanhope	Western film
1940	Sing, Dance, Plenty Hot	Judy	
1940	Ride, Tenderfoot, Ride	Patsy Randolph	
1940	Barnyard Follies	Bubbles Martin	
1940	Melody and Moonlight	Ginger O'Brien	
1940	Melody Ranch	Penny Curtis	western musical film
1941	Ridin' on a Rainbow	Patsy Evans	
1941	Back in the Saddle	Patsy	
1941	The Singing Hill	Patsy	
1941	Angels with Broken Wings	Mary Wilson	
1943	Shantytown	Elizabeth 'Liz' Gorty	
1943	Nobody's Darling	Janie Farnsworth	
1944	Cowboy and the Senorita	Chip Williams	
1944	Song of Nevada	Kitty Hanley	
1944	Three Little Sisters	Sue Scott	Comedy film

== Soundtrack ==
Year	Film	Notes
1939	Nancy Drew... Reporter	performer: "Nursery Rhyme Medley" (uncredited)
1939	South of the Border	performer: "Goodbye Little Darlin' Goodbye" (1939), "Merry-Go-Roundup" ("South of the Border" (1939), uncredited)
1940	Rancho Grande	performer: "Alla En El Rancho Grande" (1934), "Whistle" (1940), "Swing of the Range" (1940), ("Alla En El Rancho Grande" (1934), uncredited)
1940	Carolina Moon	performer: "Carolina Moon" (1928), "Me and My Echo" (1940), "Say Si Si" (1935), uncredited)
1940	Ride, Tenderfoot, Ride	performer: "Ride, Tenderfoot, Ride" (1938), "Woodpecker Song" (1940), "Oh! Oh! Oh@" (1940), ("Ride, Tenderfoot, Ride" (1938), uncredited)
1940	Melody Ranch	performer: "Torpedo Joe" (1940), "Vote For Autry" (1940) (uncredited)
1940	Ride, Tenderfoot, Ride	performer: "Ride, Tenderfoot, Ride" (1938), "Woodpecker Song" (1940), "Oh! Oh! Oh! (1940) ("Ride, Tenderfoot, Ride" (1938), uncredited)
1941	Ridin' on a Rainbow	performer: "I'm the Only Lonely One", "What's Your Favorite Holiday?"
1943	Shantytown	performer: "It Had to Be You", "On the Corner of Sunshine and Main" (uncredited)
1944	Cowboy and the Senorita	performer: "What'll I Use for Money?", "The Enchilada Man", "Cowboy and the Senorita (reprise)"
1944	Three Little Sisters	performer: "Three Little Sisters"

== Soundtracks and reissues on CD ==
- Bob Crosby's Bob Cats – Volume Four 1941–1942, 8 tracks, CD-502, Swaggie Records, Australia
- Gene Autry: The Singing Cowboy – Chapter Two, 2 tracks, VSD-5909 Varèse Sarabande Records, United States, 1998
- Gene Autry: With His Little Darlin' Mary Lee, 17 tracks, VSD-5910, Varèse Sarabande Records, United States, 1998
