= Marjorie Lynn =

American singer (1921–2016)

- Born: Margaret Mossberg; July 21, 1921; Finley, Wisconsin, US
- Died: June 19, 2016 (aged 94); Ann Arbor, Michigan, US
- Occupation: Singer

Marjorie Lynn (Lynne) (July 21, 1921 Finley, Wisconsin – June 19, 2016 Ann Arbor, Michigan) was a singer who gained fame from WLS-AM radio in Chicago and the National Barn Dance, the precursor to the Grand Ole Opry. She began as a country-western singer and then transitioned to the swing style when she and her trio joined the United Service Organizations (USO) tour.

== Early years ==
She was born Margaret Mossberg in Juneau County, Wisconsin to Swedish immigrants, and moved to Chicago at an early age. Her father Carl, who emigrated from Sweden in 1902 (with $4 in his pocket), worked as a carpenter and general contractor, and once painted the house of Ralph "Bottles" Capone, the brother of Al Capone. Ralph's granddaughter has written a book on her family's life in Chicago at the time which provides some valuable insight into the times that Marjorie grew up in. Her mother Elsie Nylin was born in Chicago to Swedish immigrants. (See Swedish Heritage below.) Marjorie was the youngest girl of 9 children. Both Marjorie's mother and mother-in-law were Blue Star Mothers during the war.

== The Radio Years ==
Marjorie joined the WLS radio family in 1941 with little training, having only worked on the vaudeville bill with movie cowboy Buck Jones. She quickly had her own morning show, "Smile-A-While," with the WLS Rangers and also appeared Saturday nights on the Barn Dance, choosing her stage name based on British singer Vera Lynn. According to the WLS archives, "she was placed on staff after one audition," after meeting with Program Director Harold Safford and Production Director Al Boyd. She appeared on the Barn Dance with such talent as Pat Buttram (later famous in the role of Mr. Haney on the TV series Green Acres), Arkie the Arkansas Woodchopper, the Hoosier Hot Shots, Lulu Belle and Scotty, Eddie Peabody, George Gobel, and Gene Autry. Her signature piece was My Adobe Hacienda, written by Louise Massey and Lee Penny, although she never recorded it. Contemporaries of hers at WLS who were not in the Barn Dance include Les Paul (performing as Rhubarb Red) and Andy Williams (part of the Williams Brothers). When Marjorie left WLS in 1944, she was replaced by Jenny Lou Carson on her morning show. In order to join the American Federation of Radio Artists (AFRA), she needed to play an instrument and so she bought a guitar from her fellow Swedish immigrants, the Larson Brothers, who basically invented the flat-top steel string guitar. The Larson guitars were the favorites among the stars at WLS because of their rich tone that transmitted exceptionally well over the radio. She taught herself and played guitar frequently on her radio shows. The Larson's Euphonon model was one of the first guitars that Les Paul electrified, and so possibly was the original electric guitar. Larson guitars, although not well known, were played by such diverse artists as Gene Autry, Patsy Montana, Bob Dylan, Jimi Hendrix, and Johnny Cash.

As a side note, Garrett Graff notes that WLS-AM became a Presidential Entry Point for the Federal Emergency Management Agency's emergency program in 2016.

== The USO Tour ==
The Meri-Maids, from left to right, Ruth Sanfheil, Mary Rumachick, and Marjorie Lynn, who toured with the Roy Smeck USO Show during World War II.

In 1943, Marjorie joined the USO to help the war effort as part of the show highlighted by Roy Smeck, the anointed "King of the Ukulele." She was the lead singer of a swing trio called the Meri-Maids, all Wisconsin girls, that also featured Ruth Sanfheil and Mary Rumachick. They toured extensively in military hospitals in the United States throughout the war. They primarily sang songs popularized by the Andrews Sisters and Barn Dance favorites the Dinning Sisters. These songs are still popular, being sung by such artists as Bette Midler and Katy Perry. Later, the Dinning's younger brother Mark Dinning had the number one hit, co-written by Jean Dinning, Teen Angel.

== Marriage and Children ==
After the war, she married Chester (Art) Anderson (1920–2000) of Batavia, Illinois, also the son of Swedish immigrants. His father Oscar emigrated from Sweden, traveling on the RMS Baltic, at the time the largest ship in the world. Oscar ran the Challenge Foundry in Batavia where Chester learned the foundry business. He served as a signalman in the US Navy in the New Guinea and Philippines campaigns, stationed on the USS LST-474. [Anderson returned from the Philippines on the destroyer USS Anderson that also carried some of the liberated soldiers from the Bataan Death March.] He was the uncle of renown Cincinnati Bengals quarterback Ken Anderson, whose father Erik also worked at Challenge. Chester earned his engineering degree at Purdue under the G.I. Bill. He was subsequently the chief metallurgist at Baker-Perkins, an expert on ductile iron, and later was a senior manager for foundries of Midland-Ross. He was also a championship horseshoe player. Marjorie and Chester had three children:

- Carolyn (born 1948), a specialist in early childhood development and gerontology
- Gerald (born 1950), a mathematician specializing in algebraic topology, earning a Ph.D. from the University of Michigan in 1974. He taught at the Massachusetts Institute of Technology (MIT) as a C. L. E. Moore instructor, a position once held by John Nash (A Beautiful Mind). Later he was a senior manager at defense contractor Science Applications International Corporation (SAIC), concentrating on strategic nuclear warfare and the Global Information Grid. He now resides at Carlsbad by the Sea (CBTS) retirement community in Carlsbad, California.
- Christine (born 1954), a periodontist and founding member of Vina Dental, a non-profit organization that provides dental services to low-income families.

All three attended the University of Michigan.

== Swedish Heritage ==
Marjorie's maternal grandparents were Nils Nylin and Wilhelmina Eklund. According to the parish records of Landsarkivet i Uppsala, "Nils Nylin admitted to be a Methodist," despite the fact that it was illegal to subscribe to any religion other that the Lutheran Church of Sweden until 1860. Nevertheless, the Swedish-born children of Nils and Wilhelmina were baptized at the famed Maria Magdalena Church in Stockholm. Nils and Wilhelmina both worked for O. E. Jonsson, a wealthy landowner reputed to be a descendant of Bo Grip (the Griffin), the most powerful man in Sweden in the 14th century. Nils, Wilhelmina and their children emigrated to the United States, traveling on the RMS City of Chester, at the time the largest passenger ship afloat.

Wilhelmina was a direct descendant of Erik X, King of Sweden, (son of Swedish king Canute I and grandson of King Erik IX "the Saint") through the marriage of Erik's daughter Martha to Nils Sixtensson Sparre, a Swedish marshall. [See Ancestors of Martha Eriksdotter, which include rulers of Sweden, Denmark, Russia and Poland.] This union brought together the powerful Sparre and Bonde families. [See Swedish Noble Families.] Martha and Nils were also related to Charles VIII, the King of Sweden in the 15th century.

== Later years ==
The Andersons settled in Saginaw, Michigan, where Marjorie was a music critic and columnist for the local newspaper, the Township Times, performed in the Pit & Balcony venue, and sang in various groups such as the Sweet Adelines, where she didn't use her stage name but instead was known informally as Margie Baby. She sang in the choir of Ames Methodist Church for twenty years and in the Germania Orchestra, under the direction of Samuel Flueckiger. She finally settled in Ann Arbor and spent her time writing and with her many grandchildren and great-grandchildren. Marjorie proudly participated in the 70th anniversary remembrance of the end of the war in Europe held in Ann Arbor in May 2015, one of 26 local residents still alive who served.

== Sources ==
- WLS Family Album, 1942
- WLS Family Album, 1943
- National Barn Dance, 1942 Rebroadcast for our World War II Servicemen
- Marjorie Lynn Is the New Young Voice You Hear, Listening in with the Prairie Farmer, WLS, 1941
- Hartman, Robert C. (2007). The Larsons' Creations: Guitars & Mandolins, Centerstream, Anaheim Hills
- Capone, Deirdre Marie (2010). Uncle Al Capone--The Inside Story from Inside His Family, Recaplodge LLC
- Margaret J. Anderson. MLive Obituaries (2016)
