= Larson Brothers Guitars =

American guitar manufacturers, 1900–1944

- Products: Guitars

Marjorie Lynn played a 1942 Euphonon guitar.

Larson Brothers Guitars were manufactured in Chicago from 1900 through 1944. They made guitars sold under other companies names, including "Stahl, Maurer, Prairie State, Euphonon, Dyer, and Stetson." They also made mandolins, ukuleles and harp guitars. They were the first manufacturers of a flat top steel string guitar, and indeed, 99.9% of their guitars were steel strings.

== History ==
Carl Larson (1867–1946) and August Larson (1873–1944) were born in Sweden and emigrated to Chicago in the late 1880s. They worked as luthiers for Robert Maurer, manufacturer of the Champion brand of guitars. The Larsons bought Maurer & Company from Robert Maurer in 1900. They opened a retail shop on Elm Street.

The brothers patented techniques in guitar building, such as laminated bracing and metal support rods. The guitars were sold under the Maurer name in addition to Euphonon, Prairie State, Stetson, and Stahl. They also built mandolins and harp guitars. Carl Larson retired in 1940, and the business was dissolved upon the death of August Larson in 1944.

After the transition of live radio broadcasts to recorded music in the 1950s, together with the prominence of the Fender and Gibson electric guitars, general awareness of Larson guitars diminished. The harp guitar became essentially obsolete.

== Fans of the guitars ==
In 1934, Les Paul was playing under the name Rhubarb Red. He was introduced to the Larson brothers by Doc Hopkins of the Cumberland Ridge Runners. Paul said that the brothers were unaware that he was the same person as Rhubarb Red. They insisted that Paul was a better guitarist. He wanted the brothers to build him a maple wood guitar with a half-inch solid maple top and no holes. They responded that without holes no sound would come out of the guitar. Paul was adamant, and for $45 he got his guitar, to which he added two pickups. It became one of the first electric guitars.

Larson brothers guitars were popular with the country and western singers on WLS-AM in Chicago and the National Barn Dance. They were played by Marjorie Lynn, the Prairie Ramblers, Arkie, the Arkansas Woodchopper, Gene Autry, and Patsy Montana.

On June 25, 1965, Bob Dylan went on stage at the Newport Folk Festival with an electric guitar, signaling Dylan's move towards rock and roll. Johnny Cash also appeared later on stage using a Euphonon guitar, which he gave to Dylan after the show as a tribute to a fellow musician. Cash can be seen with this guitar in Shelton and Goldblatt's history of country music, The Country Music Story.

== Revival ==
In 2007, the Larson Brothers brand was sold to Toni Gotz. He and Roman Zajicek, a luthier from the Czech Republic, built models based on the original Larson guitars. Then he met Maurice Dupont, a French luthier who wanted to remake the guitars. Beginning in 2013, Dupont's company built Larson model guitars in Boutiers Saint Trojan, Cognac, France.
