= ABC Barn Dance =

- Presented by: Hal O'Halloran; Jack Stillwell; John Dolce(hosts)
- Country of origin: United States

Production
- Camera setup: Multi-camera
- Running time: 30 minutes

Original release
- Network: ABC-TV
- Release: February 21 – November 14, 1949

ABC Barn Dance is an early country and western music show on American television, a simulcast of the popular radio program National Barn Dance (a title that was also sometimes used for the TV version). It also included some folk music. The show aired on Monday nights from February 21 to November 14, 1949 on ABC-TV. Originally broadcast from 8:30 to 9 p.m. Eastern Time, it was moved to 9 p.m. and then to 9:30 p.m.

Filmed at the Eighth Street Theater in Chicago, Illinois, the sustaining weekly variety show originated from WENR-TV. It was hosted by Hal O'Halloran and Jack Stillwell. Several of the radio program's performers appeared, including the Sage Riders (instrumental quartet), Lulu Belle and Scotty, Cousin Tifford, Bob Atcher, the DeZurik Sisters and Holly Swanson.

A review of the program's February 22, 1949, episode in the trade publication Billboard called it "a television programming natural which includes all the showmanship factors the medium requires ... great visual qualities, comedy, top music and talent."
