= Judy Martin (singer) =

American singer-songwriter (1917–1951)

- Also known as: Eva Foley
- Born: Eva Alaine Overstake; July 23, 1917; Decatur, Illinois, U.S.
- Died: 17 November 1951 (aged 34) Nashville, Tennessee, U.S.
- Genres: Country
- Occupation: Singer
- Years active: 1931–1951
- Labels: Cattle; M.M. Cole; Vocalion

Eva Alaine Overstake (July 23, 1917 – November 17, 1951), professionally known as Judy Martin, was an American country music singer, performing from the early 1930s to the late 40s on the WLS-AM's National Barn Dance in Chicago. She was the second wife of Country Music Hall of Fame member Red Foley and is the grandmother of Christian country music singer Debby Boone.

== Early life ==
Overstake was born in Decatur, Illinois, the third of six children of Herschel Jewel Overstake (1894-1936) and Helen Elizabeth Nalefski (1897–1988). When Eva was 12 years old her father arranged for her and her two older sisters, Evelyn and Lucille to sing three-part harmonies for The Salvation Army on street corners in Decatur. Before long the Overstake sisters were performing on local radio stations WJBL, WDZ and WTAX.

== Professional career ==
In the fall of 1931 Herschel Overstake took his three daughters to Chicago to audition for radio station WLS. The program director was so impressed with their performance in the audition he immediately scheduled them for a guest appearance the following Saturday on the WLS National Barn Dance. The girls were an immediate hit with the WLS listeners and they were hired for regular Saturday night appearances on the show to begin in January 1932.

=== The Three Little Maids ===
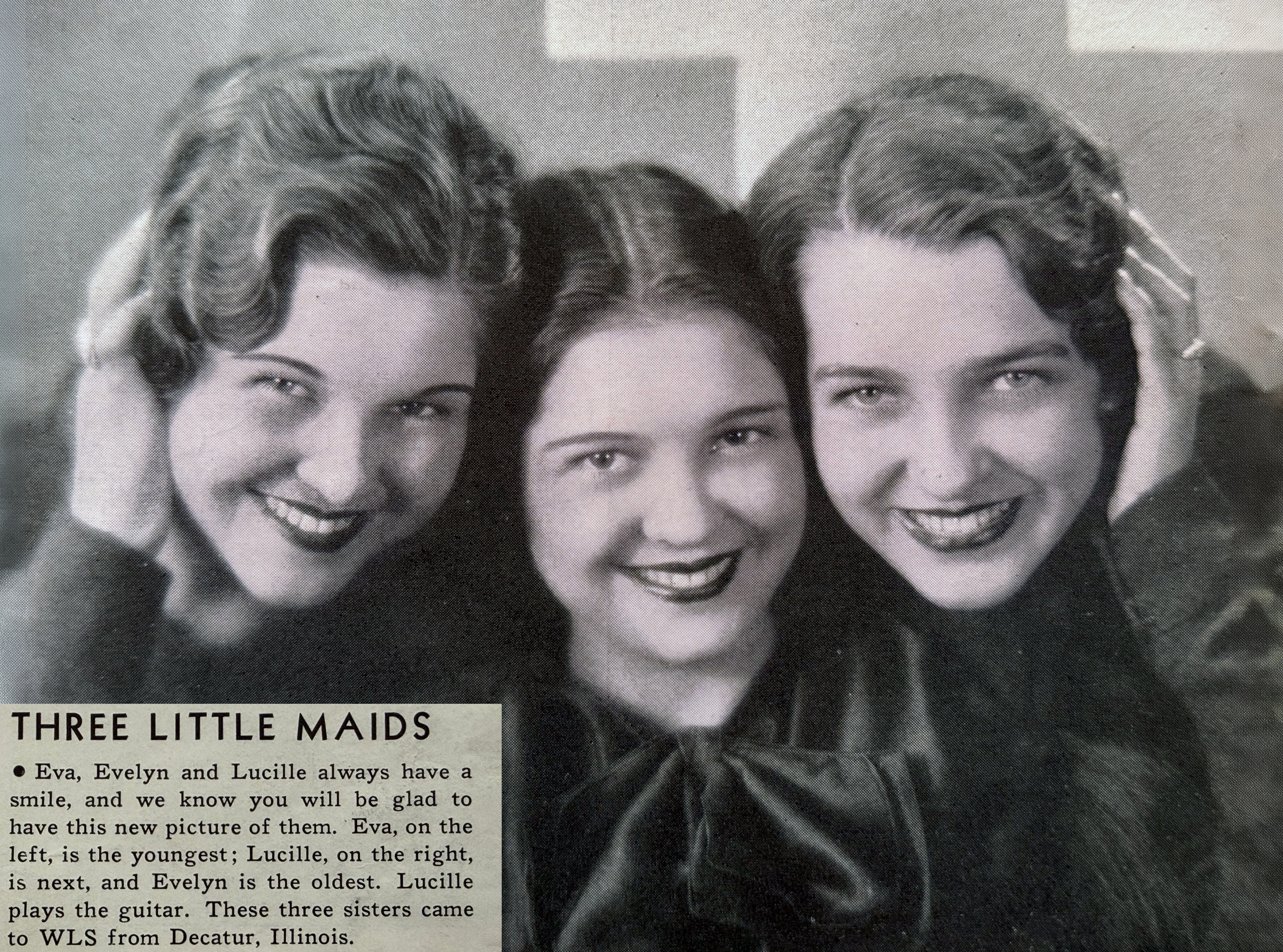

WLS station management renamed them the Three Little Maids and they were on their way to fame and fortune.

By the time of the audition, the oldest sister, Evelyn, then 17, was married and had a child. Lucille was one year younger and Eva was just 14. Herschel Overstake moved his wife and children to Chicago and became their manager. The girls continued to perform and record their music and became acquainted with other regular WLS performers such as Gene Autry, George Gobel, The Hoosier Hot Shots, Red Foley, and others. Foley took an interest in young Eva. In 1933, six months after his first wife Pauline died in childbirth, he married Eva Overstake. The "Three Little Maids" continued to perform and record as a trio and by 1933 had their own daily radio show on WLS in addition to regular performances on the National Barn Dance. On October 13, 1933, they drew an audience of 10,000 at the Chicago World's Fair.

By the end of 1933, with two of the "Three Little Maids" married, differing personal and professional goals caused the Overstate sisters to dissolve their act. At the end of 1933 Eva was expecting her first child and needed to diminish her musical performances. Evelyn continued to perform as a solo act at WLS. Lucille continued to perform and write songs and eventually became very successful under the name of Jenny Lou Carson. For a brief period Eva Foley formed a duo named the Play Party Girls with Jean Harris, wife of Karl Davis (one half of the Karl & Harty duo). She also sang occasionally with her sister Lucille at farm meetings throughout the Midwest and with her husband Red Foley. In March 1940 Eva and Red returned to WLS after a 31-month absence. Eva remained a regular on the WLS National Barn Dance until 1947.

== Personal life ==
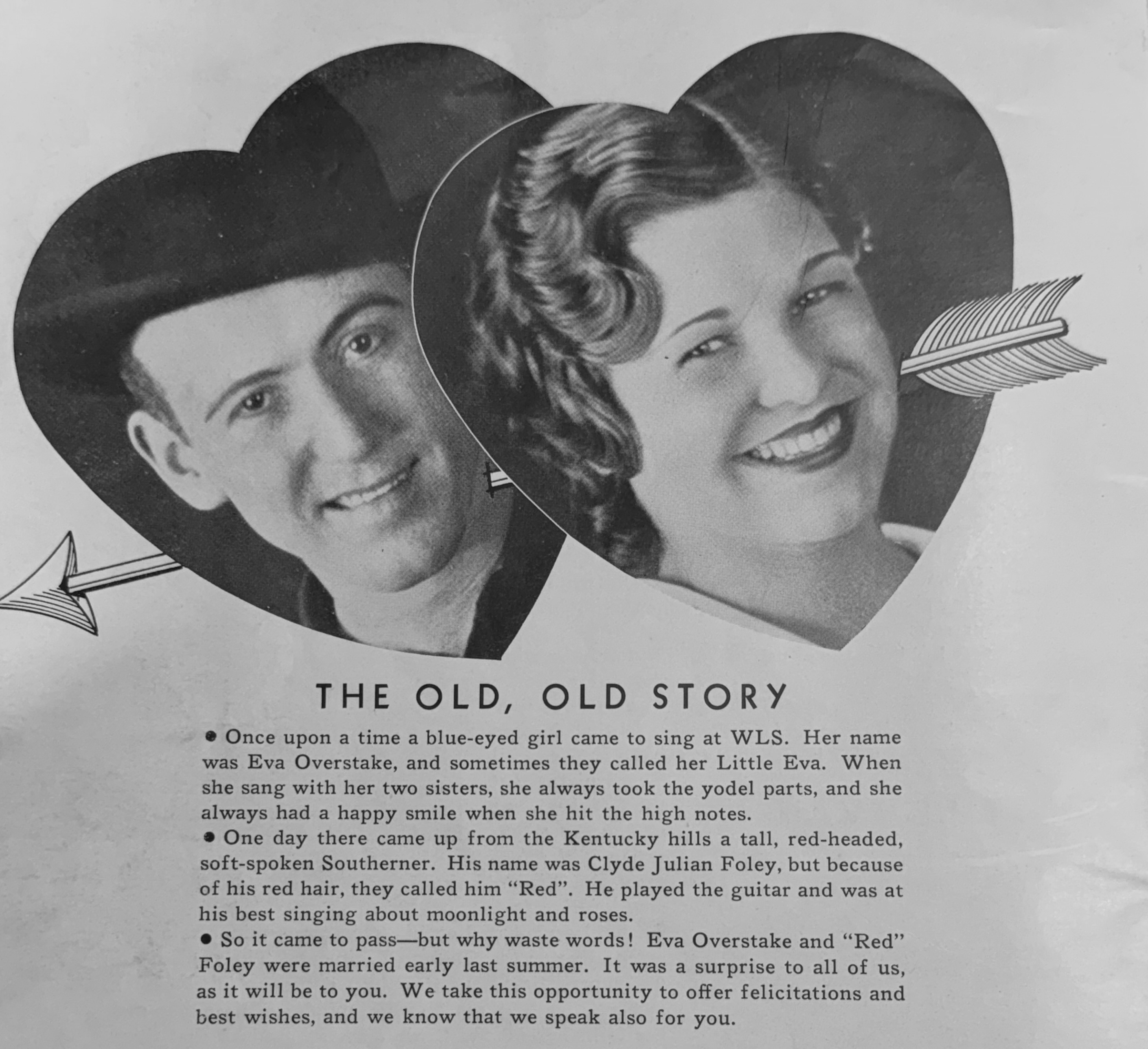

On August 9, 1933, less than three weeks after her sixteenth birthday, Eva Alaine Overstake married twenty-three-year-old Clyde Julian "Red" Foley, a widower with a baby daughter in Waukegan, Illinois. They kept the marriage secret for a brief period of time. On April 24, 1934, she gave birth to a daughter. Shirley Lee Foley. Their second child, Julie Ann, was born on April 18, 1938. On May 30, 1940, their third daughter, Jenny Lou, was born. On Saturday, November 17, 1951, Eva Foley age 34, died at her Nashville, Tennessee home from an overdose of sleeping pills. She left a note explaining the reasons for her suicide, but the facts have never been made public. Shirley wed actor-singer Pat Boone in 1953. Their daughters are Cheryl Lynn, Linda Lee, Laura Gene and country and Christian music singer Debby Boone.

== Discography (partial) ==
- "I Love You Mother", 78 rpm, Red Vinyl LST-9994-2
- "Our Christmas Waltz" vocal with Red Foley, Decca 46185, 8/23/1949
- Lets go to church (next Sunday morning) Vocal duet with Red Foley, Decca 46235 - 4/4/1950
- "Remember Me (When the Candle Lights are Gleaming)" vocal duet with Red Foley, Decca 46235
- "Gentle Nettie Moore", Judy Martin and her Mountain Rangers, Volume 2 with Red Foley, BACM reissue CD
- Judy Martin Presents Red Foley and the Mountain Rangers, Cattle reissue CD
- Judy Martin and her Mountain Rangers including Red Foley, 24 songs, Cattle reissue CD
- Judy Martin and her Mountain Rangers, Straight Shootin' Cowgirl, 25 songs, BACM reissue CD

== Sources ==
- Rogers, Arnold; Langley, Jerry (2005). Many tears ago: the life and times of Jenny Lou Carson. Madison, TN: Nova/Nashville Books. ISBN 978-0-9628452-4-6.
