= Dusty Anderson =

American actress and model (1916–2007)

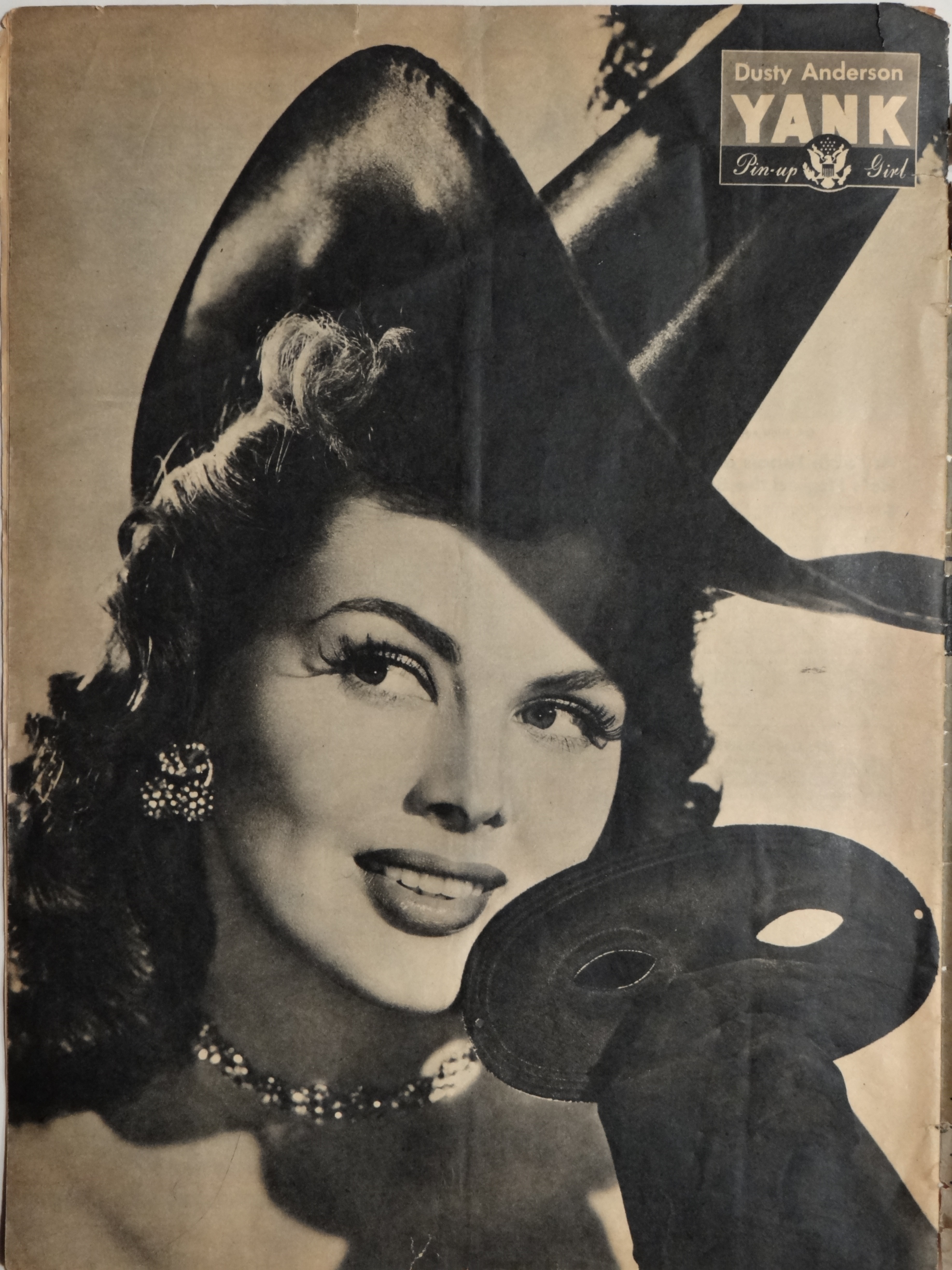
- Anderson in 1944
- Born: Ruth Anderson; December 17, 1916; Toledo, Ohio, U.S.
- Died: September 11, 2007 (aged 90); Marbella, Spain
- Other name: Dusty Negulesco
- Occupations: Actress, pin-up model
- Years active: 1944–1951
- Spouses: Charles Mathieu (m. 1941; div. 1945) Jean Negulesco (m. 1946; died 1993)
- Children: 2

Ruth "Dusty" Anderson (December 17, 1916 – September 11, 2007) was an American actress and model who worked in the 1940s. She was a World War II pin-up model and appeared in the Yank magazine.

== Career ==
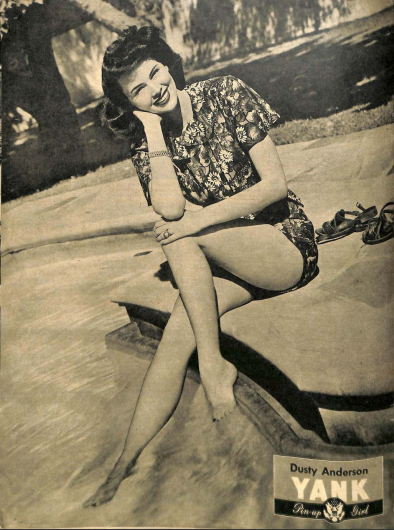
Pin-up photo of Anderson for Yank, the Army Weekly in 1943

Anderson was born in Toledo, Ohio, United States. She began her career as a model and made her film debut in a minor role as one of the magazine cover girls in the 1944 Columbia Pictures production of Cover Girl starring Rita Hayworth.

Over the next three years Anderson appeared in another eight films, usually in secondary roles. During World War II, she was one of a number of actresses who became a pin-up girl, appearing in the October 27, 1944, issue of the United States Military's Yank magazine.

Columbia featured 15 magazine models in Cover Girl but signed only two to talent contracts: Betty Jane Graham and Dusty Anderson. Anderson played minor roles in the studio's "A" features, but had major roles in the studio's "B" features with the Crime Doctor (Crime Doctor's Warning, 1945), Boston Blackie (The Phantom Thief, 1946), and The Hoosier Hot Shots (Singing on the Trail, 1946).

== Personal life and death ==
Anderson was married twice and had two children. On July 18, 1941, she married Charles Mathieu, Jr., a captain in the United States Marine Corps. They divorced on June 13, 1945. On July 21, 1946, Anderson married director Jean Negulesco in West Los Angeles, California, and retired from acting. Four years later, her final screen work was an uncredited role in one of her husband's films (Under My Skin, 1950). In 1971, Anderson and Negulesco settled in Paris in retirement.

The couple was living in Marbella, Spain when Jean Negulesco died in 1993. Dusty Anderson Negulesco died in Marbella on September 11, 2007, from natural causes and was buried within the city, at the Cementerio Virgen del Carmen.

== Selected filmography ==
- Tonight and Every Night (1945)
- Crime Doctor's Warning (1945)
- The Phantom Thief (1946)
- Singing on the Trail (1946)

== See also ==
- Pin-ups of Yank, the Army Weekly
