= Marcus Conyers =

'Dr Marcus Conyers' is an author and developer of graduate degree programs focused on improving leading and learning by bridging mind, brain, and implementation research to practice. Conyers is the coauthor, with Donna Wilson, of 20 books in this field, including Smarter Teacher Leadership: Neuroscience and the Power of Purposeful Collaboration (Teachers College Press, 2016), Teaching Students to Drive Their Brains: Metacognitive Strategies, Activities and Lesson Ideas (ASCD, 2016), Positively Smarter: Science and Strategies for Increasing Happiness, Achievement, and Well-Being (Wiley-Blackwell, 2015), Five Big Ideas for Effective Teaching: Connecting Mind, Brain, and Education Research to Classroom Practice (Teachers College Press, 2020), and Flourishing in the First Five Years: Connecting Implications from Mind, Brain, and Education Research to the Development of Young Children (Rowman & Littlefield Education, 2013).

Conyers is the lead developer of the doctoral minor in Brain-Based Leadership and co-developer of the Master of Science and Educational Specialist degree programs with a major in Brain-Based Teaching with the Abraham S. Fischler School of Education at Nova Southeastern University. Conyers serves as a subject matter supervisor for the Ph.D. in Professional Practice: Psychological Perspectives with Canterbury Christ Church University. Conyers presents at leadership and educational conferences in the United States and internationally and blogs regularly on Edutopia and Edweek. Conyers is co-founder of the nonprofit Center for Innovative Education and Prevention (CIEP) and founder of BrainSMART.

== Philosophy ==
From the beginning of his career, Conyers has shared a philosophy that virtually every human being has vast untapped cognitive potential and that effective leadership supports the transformation of this potential into higher levels of performance and well-being. His work has focused on improving leading, learning, and teaching by bridging implications of relevant brain science and cognitive psychology to practice. Additionally, in the field of education, Conyers has focused on empowering educators with the knowledge and skills they need to help all students learn the metacognitive, cognitive, and social-emotional skills required to reach more of their unique potential and to thrive in the global innovation economy. His work with tens of thousands of educational leaders and educators is informed by a synergy of education, mind, and relevant brain research. He is the developer of the original BrainSMART model, which offers practical strategies designed to help students maintain a healthy and optimistic state for learning, to make lessons meaningful, to maintain students’ focus and attention on learning, to retain what they have learned, and to transfer and demonstrate their new knowledge in assessments and real-life applications. He also codeveloped Thinking for Results, a process for equipping students with the cognitive tools they need to actualize their learning potential.

== Education and professional experience ==
Conyers earned his Ph.D. at the University of Westminster. The focus of Conyers's thesis was improving practice through education, mind, and selected brain research. The thesis for Conyers's MSc with the University of Huddersfield was on cardiovascular health promotion through the application of the learning sciences and social marketing strategies.

Conyers was the lead consultant for two educational research projects:

1. The implementation of an original brain-based teaching approach supported by a Challenge Grant from the Annenberg Foundation with Florida Atlantic University
2. A three-year, statewide Florida Department of Education initiative on brain-based teaching, Scholarships for Teachers in Action Research (STAR).

The effectiveness of the latter initiative led to the development of Master of Science and Educational Specialist degrees with a major in Brain-Based Teaching through Nova Southeastern University. Conyers considers brain-based teaching to be an approach to instruction that acknowledges that learning changes the structure and function of the brain and that educational and cognitive research can be used to enhance classroom teaching practice.

Conyers presents internationally at conferences with educational institutions, including the University of Cambridge in the United Kingdom, Leiden University in The Netherlands, University of Dubai, the South African Principals Association, the Singapore Teachers Union, and universities across the United States and Canada.
