= Singing on the Trail =

1946 film by Ray Nazarro

- Theatrical release poster
- Directed by: Ray Nazarro
- Screenplay by: J. Benton Cheney
- Produced by: Colbert Clark
- Starring: The Hoosier Hot Shots; Ken Curtis; Jeff Donnell; Guy Kibbee; Dusty Anderson; Guinn "Big Boy" Williams
- Cinematography: George F. Kelley
- Edited by: James Sweeney
- Production company: Columbia Pictures
- Distributed by: Columbia Pictures
- Release date: September 2, 1946
- Running time: 69 minutes
- Country: United States
- Language: English

Singing on the Trail is a 1946 American Western film directed by Ray Nazarro and written by J. Benton Cheney. The film stars The Hoosier Hot Shots and features Ken Curtis, Jeff Donnell, Guy Kibbee, Dusty Anderson, and Guinn "Big Boy" Williams. The film was released on September 2, 1946, by Columbia Pictures.

== Plot ==
The Hoosier Hot Shots (Hezzie Trietsch, Ken Trietsch, Gil Taylor, and Gabe Ward) are musical entertainers at the Circle X Ranch. Fugitive swindler Jerry Easton (Ian Keith), with the law on his trail, sells the ranch to the Hot Shots and leaves town with his accomplice Dan Pritchard (Matt Willis). Old-time two-gun lawman Dusty Wyatt (Guy Kibbee) arrives at the ranch with both barrels blazing. He vows to shoot the swindlers who cheated him, only to find the Hot Shots in their place.

Cowhand Curt Stanton (Ken Curtis) wants to sing professionally, and applies for a job at the ranch. When Curt scares off a local bully with some flashy gun moves, the Hot Shots think Curt is an experienced gunman and hire him as a bodyguard. Curt wants permission to marry Wyatt's daughter (Dusty Anderson), but Wyatt tests Curt's worthiness by challenging him to a shooting contest.

Meanwhile the swindlers, who have made off with the Hot Shots' bill of sale as well as their cash, realize that their trick has backfired: the Hot Shots still have the bill of sale. While the Circle X Ranch presents an elaborate musical revue, the swindlers confront the Hot Shots and their friends at gunpoint, and demand the bill of sale deciding the ownership of the ranch. Lawman Wyatt gets the drop on the swindlers, and all ends happily.

== Cast ==
=== Starring ===
- The Hoosier Hot Shots:

Paul Trietsch as Hezzie
Ken Trietsch as Ken
Gil Taylor as Gil
Gabe Ward as Gabe

=== Featuring ===
- Ken Curtis as Curt Stanton
- Jeff Donnell as Cindy Brown
- Guy Kibbee as Dusty Wyatt
- Dusty Anderson as Helen Wyatt
- Guinn "Big Boy" Williams as Big Boy Webster
- Ian Keith as Jerry Easton
- Matt Willis as Dan Pritchard
- Sam Flint as Terrence Mallory
- Joe Haworth as Cheyenne Pete
- Jody Gilbert as Casey, café proprietor
- Eddy Waller as Lem, gas-station proprietor
- Coulter Irwin as Hotel Clerk

=== Specialty acts ===
- Deuce Spriggens and His Band with Carolina Cotton
- The Plainsmen Trio
- The Four Chicks and Chuck (Chuck Goldstein, formerly of The Modernaires)

== Production ==
The Hoosier Hot Shots were a popular "rural rhythm" quartet, featured on the NBC network radio show The National Barn Dance. In April 1944 Columbia signed them to a movie contract to star in their own series of musical westerns. Although the band stopped making pictures for Columbia in 1948, the studio kept the Hot Shots features in circulation.

== Reception ==
Showmen's Trade Review called Singing on the Trail "a western that abounds with musical numbers, yet also has the other ingredients associated with this type of entertainment." Theater owners who played Singing on the Trail reported excellent business. "In my situation this is the best musical western group. They are hard to beat." (Carl Hilbert, Cornell, Wisconsin); "We like these western musicals. They draw well for me and please on Saturday nights." (Dow Summers, Unionville, Missouri). "This one is as good as the others in this series. That makes it O. K. for my patrons. Keep these coming, Columbia." (Joe Hayworth, Pink Hill, North Carolina). "It will be liked 100 percent. It has good music, just the type that the farmers and hillbillies go for. You can't go wrong on this picture." (Albert Hefferan, Coopersville, Michigan).

Singing on the Trail did well enough on its original run that Columbia reissued it to theaters in 1955 and 1958. It was syndicated to television in 1955.
