= The Phantom Thief =

1946 film

- Directed by: D. Ross Lederman
- Written by: Jack Boyle; G.A. Snow; Richard Wormser; Richard Weil; Malcolm Stuart Boylan
- Produced by: John Stone
- Starring: Chester Morris; Jeff Donnell; Richard Lane
- Cinematography: George Meehan
- Edited by: Al Clark
- Music by: Mischa Bakaleinikoff
- Production company: Columbia Pictures
- Distributed by: Columbia Pictures
- Release date: May 2, 1946
- Running time: 65 minutes
- Country: United States
- Language: English

The Phantom Thief is a 1946 American mystery crime film directed by D. Ross Lederman and starring Chester Morris, Jeff Donnell and Richard Lane. It was produced and distributed by Columbia Pictures as part of the Boston Blackie series.

== Plot ==
Detective Boston Blackie tries to track down a blackmailer-murderer. As the investigation goes on, a supernatural element becomes clear.

== Cast ==
- Chester Morris as Horatio 'Boston Blackie' Black
- Jeff Donnell as Anne Parks Duncan
- Richard Lane as Inspector John Farraday
- Dusty Anderson as Sandra
- George E. Stone as The Runt
- Frank Sully as Detective Sergeant Matthews
- Marvin Miller as Dr. Nejino
- Wilton Graff as Rex Duncan
- Murray Alper as Eddie Alexander, Chauffeur
- Forbes Murray as Dr. Purcell Nash
- Joseph Crehan as 'Jumbo' Madigan - Pawnbroker
