= Frank Hammill =

American politician

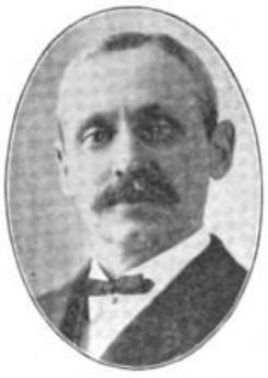

Member of the Wisconsin State Assembly
- In office 1908–1910
- Constituency: Bayfield, Sawyer, and Washburn Counties

Personal details
- Born: December 23, 1857 Parma, Michigan
- Died: February 18, 1922 (aged 64) Spooner, Wisconsin
- Party: Republican
- Occupation: Farmer, editor, politician

Frank Hammill (December 23, 1857 – February 18, 1922) was an American farmer, railroad engineer, and politician.

== Biography ==
Born in Parma, Michigan, Hammill worked for the Michigan Central Railroad and then for the Chicago, St. Paul, Minneapolis and Omaha Railway. Hammill, his wife, and family lived in Cable, Wisconsin, where he also farmed and grew fruit berries. In 1902, Hammill and his wife moved to Spooner, Wisconsin. Hammill bought two Spooner newspapers and consolidated into the Spooner Advocate and was the editor and publisher. In 1903, Hammill was elected president of the Village of Spooner and was a Republican. In 1909, Hammill served in the Wisconsin State Assembly. From 1910 until 1918, Hammill served as mayor of Spooner, when the village became a city. Hammill died in Spooner, Wisconsin.
