= Wisconsin Canoe Heritage Museum =

Museum in Wisconsin, United States

Coordinates: 45.82458°N 91.88776°W

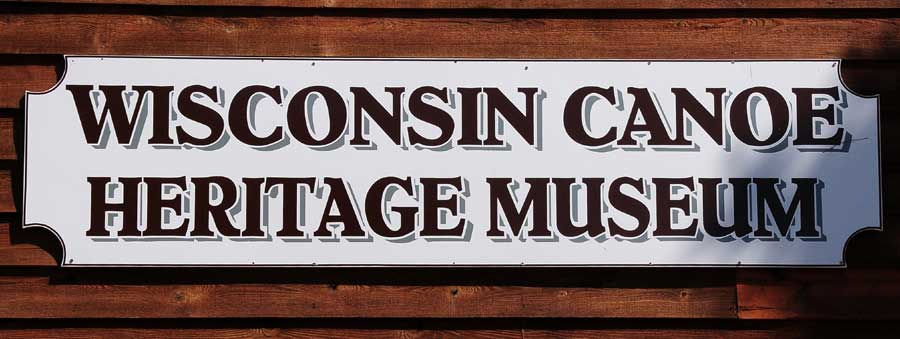

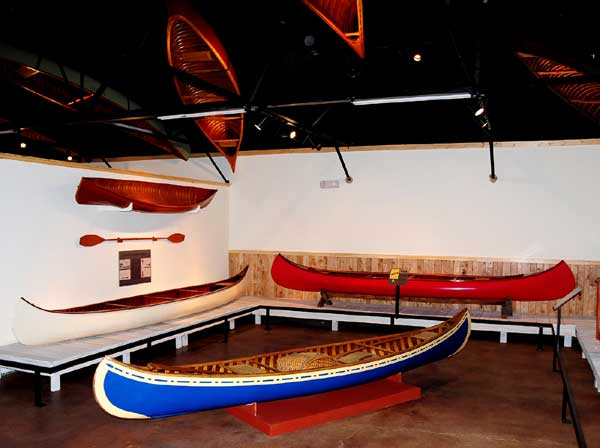
An exhibit hall in the Wisconsin Canoe Heritage Museum. Two canoes built by J. H. Rushton, Canton, New York, are along the left wall, and the red canoe was built by B. N. Morris, Veazie, Maine.

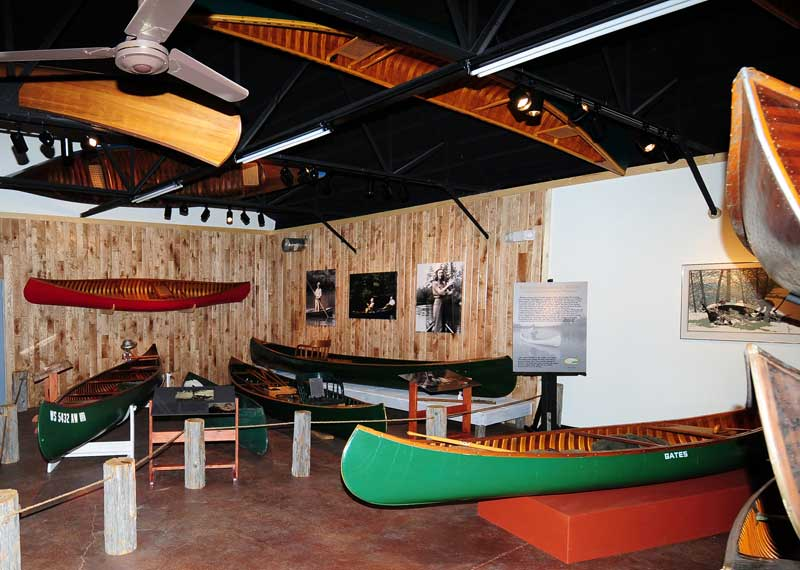
Another exhibit all in the museum

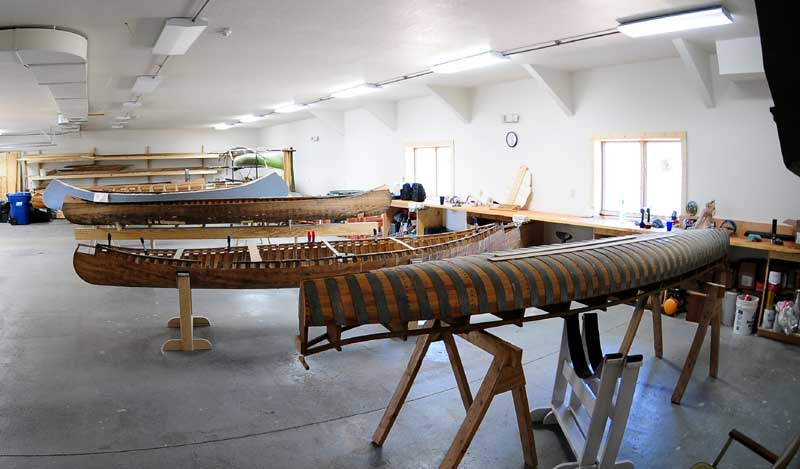
The museum's canoe restoration shop

The Wisconsin Canoe Heritage Museum, located in Spooner, Wisconsin, United States, is a museum dedicated to preserving the history of the canoe. It is the only museum located in the United States that is exclusively dedicated to the preservation and interpretation of the cultural heritage of North American canoe.

The museum was built by volunteers and located in the former Baker Grain Elevator building with funding assistance from the city of Spooner. It opened in May 2010.

The museum's Exhibit Hall features displays of canoes and canoe related ephemera. It includes craft from the golden age of North American canoeing as well as work by contemporary builders. The building traditions of the eastern seaboard, the midwest, and Canada are represented. Its Canoe Shop is a 2,500-square-foot (230 m^{2}) facility designed support a new generation of builders and canoe restorers.

== Other museums with canoes ==
The world's largest dedicated canoe museum, the Canadian Canoe Museum, is located in Peterborough, Ontario.

There are other museums in the U. S. that include canoes in their collections of boats. These include the Thousand Islands Museum, Clayton, New York, the Mystic Seaport Museum, Mystic, Connecticut, and the Adirondack Museum, Blue Mountain Lake, New York.
