= Jeff Donnell =

American actress (1921–1988)

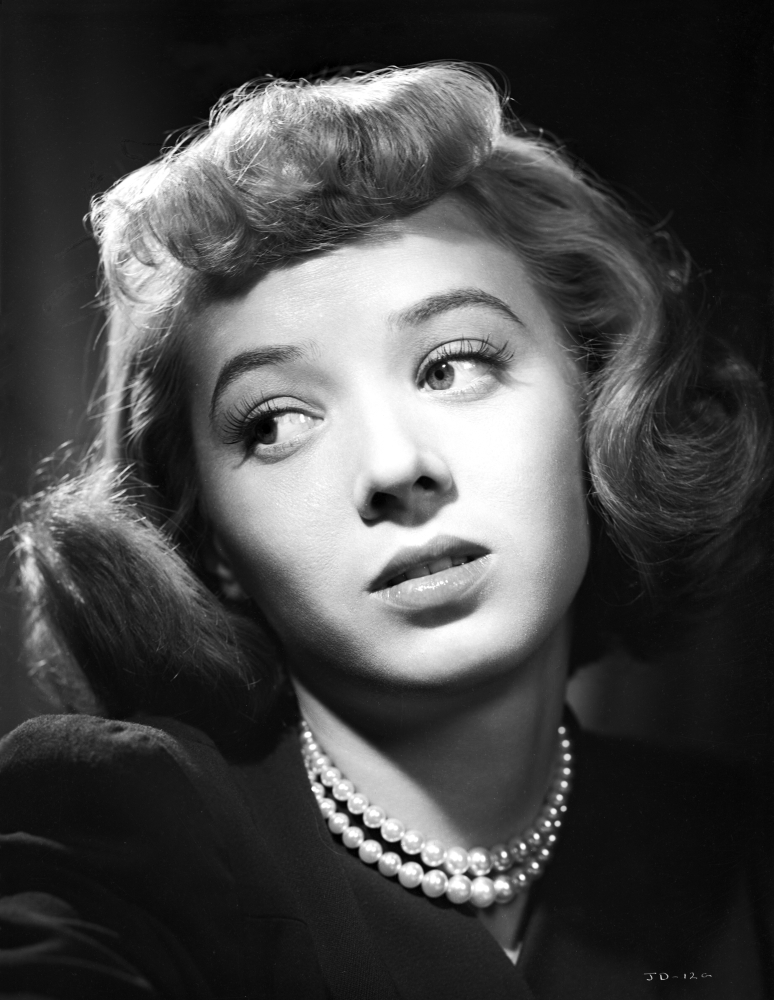
- Donnell, c. 1940s
- Born: Jean Marie Donnell; July 10, 1921; Windham, Maine, U.S.
- Died: April 11, 1988 (aged 66); Los Angeles, California, U.S.
- Occupation: Actress
- Years active: 1942–1988
- Spouses: William R. Anderson (m. 1940; div. 1952) Aldo Ray (m. 1954; div. 1957) John Bricker (m. 1958; div. 1963) Radcliffe Bealey (m. 1970; div. 1970)
- Children: 2

Jean Marie "Jeff" Donnell (July 10, 1921 – April 11, 1988) was an American actress.

== Early years ==
Donnell was born in South Windham, Maine, to Harold and Mildred Donnell, when her father was superintendent at a boys' reformatory in that town. As a child, she adopted the nickname "Jeff" after the character in her favorite comic strip, Mutt and Jeff. (Note: Newspaper columnist Erskine Johnson wrote in a July 12, 1943, article, "... an uncle nicknamed her Jeff when she was three years old and the name stuck.") To avoid gender confusion, she was sometimes billed as "(Miss) Jeff Donnell."

Donnell graduated from Towson High School, Towson, Maryland, in 1938 and attended the Leland Powers School of Drama in Boston, Massachusetts. Later, she studied at the Yale School of Drama.

== Career ==
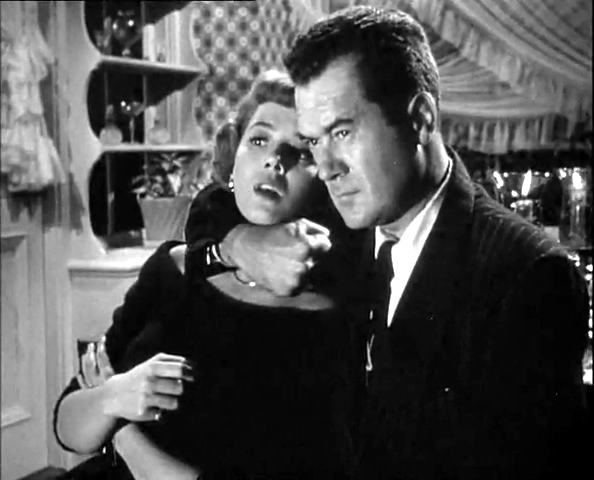
Donnell and Frank Lovejoy in In a Lonely Place (1950)

Donnell was signed to a contract by Columbia Pictures while she was active with the Farragut Playhouse in New Hampshire, and she made her film debut in My Sister Eileen (1942).

She became a fixture at Columbia, working steadily in comedies, mysteries, westerns, and musicals for five years, and then off and on at the studio from 1950 to 1972. During the 1940s she was typically the house tomboy, a plain-speaking sidekick for the glamorous ingenue, and developed a flair for comedy. Columbia did give Donnell the glamour treatment later (in the 1946 Boston Blackie mystery The Phantom Thief, in which she played a troubled heiress), but she never shook the sidekick image. When her Columbia contract ran out, she freelanced at other studios, mostly in low-budget action pictures. She returned to Columbia in 1950. She had met Lucille Ball on the set of the 1948 RKO Radio Pictures production Easy Living; Ball remembered Donnell and recruited her to play her sidekick in The Fuller Brush Girl (1950).

Donnell continued to play character roles in motion pictures and television; for three seasons, she portrayed George Gobel's wife, Alice, in The George Gobel Show (1954–1957) on NBC-TV. Many of her assignments were for Columbia (notably as Gidget's mother Dorothy Lawrence in Gidget Goes Hawaiian and Gidget Goes to Rome) and Columbia's TV subsidiary Screen Gems (she played Hannah Marshall in the Gidget television series, and portrayed Mrs. Bennett in the TV series Julia). In 1966 she made five appearances on Dr. Kildare as Evelyn Driscoll, and she played Ethel on the Matt Helm TV series.

Her last Columbia feature was the women's lib-themed comedy Stand Up and Be Counted (1972). Her final recurring role was as Stella Fields, the Quartermaines' housekeeper, in the popular soap opera General Hospital, from 1979 to 1988.

== Personal life ==
Donnell's four marriages all ended in divorce. The first, in 1940 (and ultimately longest), was to William R. Anderson, her teacher at the Leland Powers Dramatic School. Donnell had her only children with him, namely Michael Phineas—affectionately dubbed Mickey Finn—in 1942 and Sarah Jane (aka Sally), whom the couple adopted in the fall of 1947. Anderson and Donnell divorced in 1952.

Next came actor Aldo Ray, whom Donnell married in 1954 and divorced in 1957. Her third marriage, to advertising executive John Bricker, began on December 1, 1958 and concluded in an uncontested divorce decree issued on March 19, 1963, with Donnell reporting that Bricker had, among other things, publicly belittled both herself and her adopted daughter.

Donnell's fourth and final marriage, to Radcliffe (aka Rod) Bealey, lasted all of three months, comprising roughly the spring of 1970. Commencing in March of that year with a guest list confined to family and close friends, the marriage was officially dissolved in June.

== Death ==
On April 11, 1988, at age 66, Donnell died of a heart attack at her home in Hollywood. As for her then-still-recurring role on General Hospital, a contemporaneous report by syndicated soaps pundit Lynda Hirsch states that Donnell was being replaced by another actress in that season's remaining few episodes, and would then be written out of the show altogether, the onscreen rationale consisting of a note left with her character's employers, explaining that she had to leave to care for an ailing relative.

== Credits ==
- My Sister Eileen (1942) - Helen Loomis
- The Boogie Man Will Get You (1942) - Winnie Slade
- A Night to Remember (1942) - Anne Stafford Carstairs
- What's Buzzin', Cousin? (1943) - Billie (uncredited)
- Doughboys in Ireland (1943) - Molly Callahan
- There's Something About a Soldier (1943) - Jean Burton
- Nine Girls (1944) - 'Butch' Hendricks
- Once Upon a Time (1944) - Girl from Brooklyn (uncredited)
- Stars on Parade (1944) - Mary Brooks
- She's a Soldier Too (1944) - Mary Fleming (uncredited)
- Sensations of 1945 (1944) - Young Girl (uncredited)
- Mr. Winkle Goes to War (1944) - USO Hostess (uncredited)
- Three Is a Family (1944) - Hazel Whittaker
- Dancing in Manhattan (1944) - Julie Connors
- Carolina Blues (1944) - Charlotte Barton
- Eadie Was a Lady (1945) - Pamela 'Pepper' Parker
- The Power of the Whistler (1945) - Francie
- A Thousand and One Nights (1945) - Harem Girl (uncredited)
- Over 21 (1945) - Jan Lupton
- Song of the Prairie (1945) - Penelope 'Penny' Stevens
- Tars and Spars (1946) - Penny McDougal
- Throw a Saddle on a Star (1946) - Judy Lane
- Night Editor (1946) - Martha Cochrane
- The Phantom Thief (1946) - Anne Parks Duncan
- That Texas Jamboree (1946) - Jean Warren
- The Unknown (1946, One of the "I Love A Mystery" movies) - Nina Arnold
- Cowboy Blues (1946) - Susan Nelson
- Singing on the Trail (1946) - Cindy Brown
- It's Great to Be Young (1946) - Georgia Johnson
- Mr. District Attorney (1947) - Miss Miller
- Roughshod (1949) - Elaine Wyatt
- Stagecoach Kid (1949) - Jessie Arnold
- Outcasts of the Trail (1949) - Vinnie White
- Post Office Investigator (1949) - April Shaughnessy
- Easy Living (1949) - Penny McCarr
- In a Lonely Place (1950) - Sylvia Nicolai
- Hoedown (1950) - Vera Wright
- Big Timber (1950) - Sally
- The Fuller Brush Girl (1950) - Jane Bixby
- Redwood Forest Trail (1950) - Julie Westcott
- Walk Softly, Stranger (1950) - Gwen
- Three Guys Named Mike (1951) - Alice Raymend
- The First Time (1952) - Donna Gilbert
- Thief of Damascus (1952) - Sheherazade
- Skirts Ahoy! (1952) - Lt. Giff
- Because You're Mine (1952) - Patty Ware
- The Blue Gardenia (1953) - Sally Ellis
- So This Is Love (1953) - Henrietta Van Dyke
- Flight Nurse (1953) - Lt. Ann Phillips
- Massacre Canyon (1954) - Cora
- Magnificent Roughnecks (1956) - Julie
- Mr. Adams and Eve (1957, Episode: "You Can't Go Home Again") - Adele
- The Guns of Fort Petticoat (1957) - Mary Wheller
- Destination 60,000 (1957) - Ruth Buckley
- Sweet Smell of Success (1957) - Sally
- My Man Godfrey (1957) - Molly
- Gidget Goes Hawaiian (1961) - Dorothy Lawrence
- Force of Impulse (1961) - Louise Reese
- Perry Mason (1962–1964, TV series) - Rose Carol
- The Iron Maiden (1963; released in the U.S. as Swinging Maiden) - Miriam Fisher
- Gidget Goes to Rome (1963) - Mrs. Lawrence
- The Addams Family (1966, TV series) - Eleanor Digby
- The Comic (1969) - Nurse
- Tora! Tora! Tora! (1970) - Cornelia Fort, a flying instructor
- The Jimmy Stewart Show (1971, TV series) - Agatha Dwiggins
- Stand Up and Be Counted (1972) - Ruth
- Adam-12 (1973, TV Series) - Mrs James Nelson
- Barnaby Jones (1973, Episode: "Sunday: Doomsday") - Janet Gossett
- The Amazing Spider-Man (1977, TV series) - May Parker
- The Bob Newhart Show (1978, TV series) - Clara Hackler ("The Little Woman")
- General Hospital (1979–1988, in the TV soap opera) - Stella Fields (final appearance)
