= Travis Randall =

American actor and musician

Travis Randall (born Travis Michael Randall; December 9, 1972) is an American actor and musician. He was born in Spooner, Wisconsin. In 2008 he was a regular on Spike Network's MANswers as the exotic food expert appearing in multiple episodes. In 2005 he appeared in the film Never Been Thawed that was directed and written by Sean Anders who would go on to write and direct Sex Drive as well as projects such as Mr. Popper's Penguins, Hot Tub Time Machine, She's Out of My League, and Dumb and Dumber To. Sean and Travis were in the band Stone Bogart together. They made music and covered such songs as Monty Python's "The Lumberjack Song." Travis is also an acclaimed chef with a cookbook due in late 2015 according to his website. Travis also has a BBQ sauce available through his website. He regularly appears on radio and TV segments about food nationally. As of 2011 he was teaching grilling classes periodically in Scottsdale, Arizona.

== Music ==
Travis was the bass player for the American rock band Stone Bogart from 1993 to 2001. He appeared on a comedy DVD and Comedy Central Special with comedian/author Greg Behrendt as part of the band Black Rattle. Stone Bogart is set to reunite on Oct 18th 2013 after 12 years. He has made appearances in various performing rock bands in Los Angeles and Phoenix in recent years.

Travis plays bass, guitar, and drums. He also has worked as a live audio engineer and studio producer.

== Technical ==
In 2009 Travis directed and produced a music video for Jeff Caudill for the song "I Was The Lead Singer". Currently he owns and operates Rock & Roll BBQ in Los Angeles California featuring BBQ skills learned from his dad and grandfather. Travis worked in the sound department for Charlie's Angels: Full Throttle in 2003. Travis served as a location manager on The Muppets movie and has also worked as a location supervisor for the Academy Awards from 2003 to 2017. Travis produced and engineered Greg Behrendt's CD "Uncool" which received critical acclaim and was re-released in 2012.

Travis owns Full Staging Production Services Inc in Los Angeles.

== Television ==
Appeared on multiple episodes of Spike Networks' show MANswers as a culinary expert. Notable segments included "Roadkill" and "Cat vs. Dog," and "What's More Nutritious?" He has also appeared on Food Network's "Diners, Drive Ins, and Dives."

== Film ==
Appeared in the popular mockumentary Never Been Thawed which was directed by Sean Anders.
