= Spooner, Wisconsin =

- City
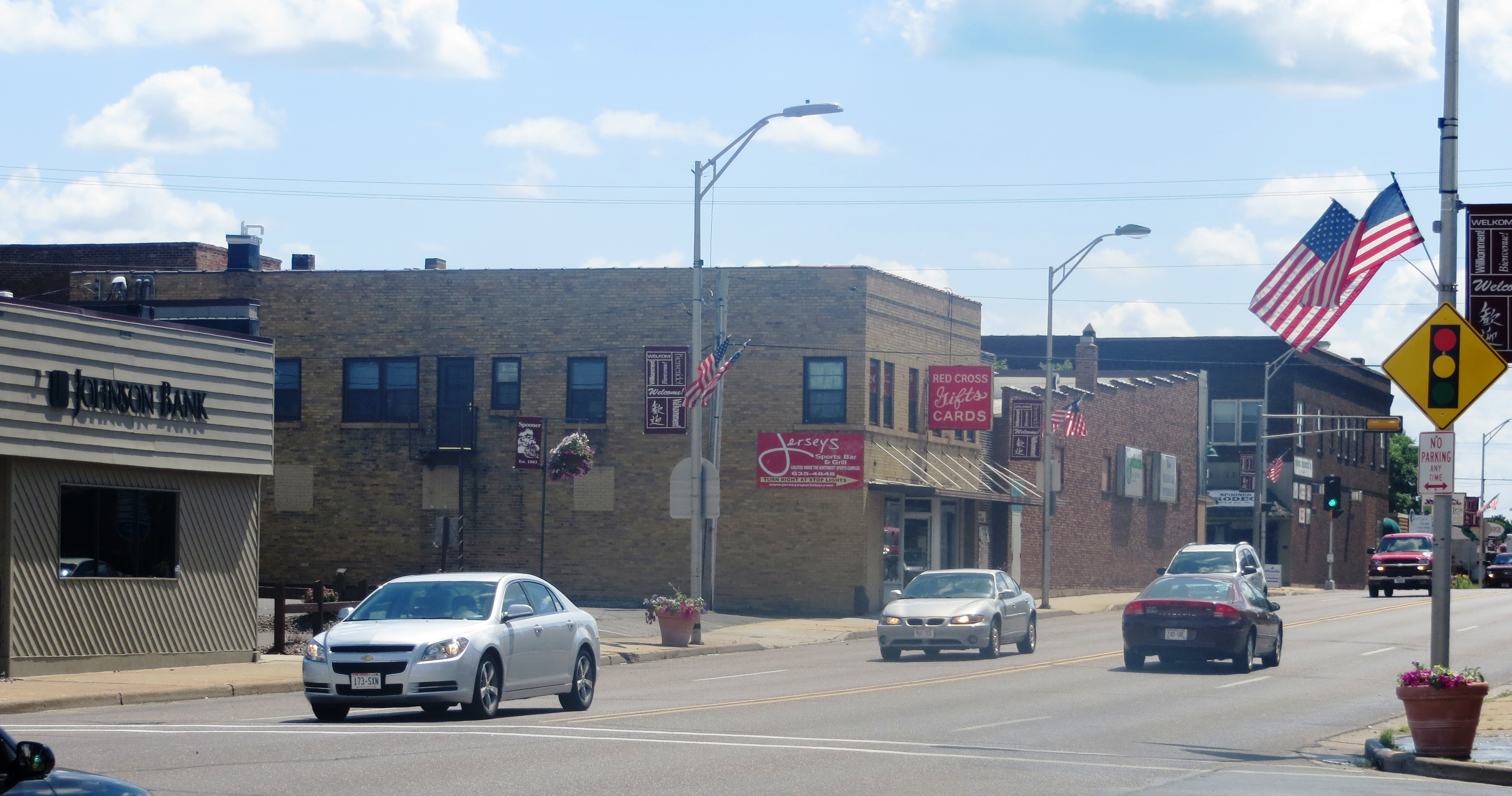
- Downtown Spooner
- Nickname: Crossroads of the North
- Location of Spooner in Washburn County, Wisconsin

- Location within Wisconsin Location within the United States
- Coordinates: 45°49′33″N 91°53′28″W
- Country: United States
- State: Wisconsin
- County: Washburn

Area
  - Total: 4.27 sq mi (11.06 km^{2})
  - Land: 4.03 sq mi (10.45 km^{2})
  - Water: 0.24 sq mi (0.61 km^{2})

Population (2020)
  - Total: 2,477
  - Estimate (2020): 2,573
  - Density: 637.8/sq mi (246.26/km^{2})
- Time zone: UTC−6 (Central (CST))
  - Summer (DST): UTC−5 (CDT)
- Area codes: 715 & 534
- FIPS code: 55-75625
- Website: Official website

Spooner is a city in Washburn County, Wisconsin, United States. The population was 2,573 at the 2020 census. The city is located mostly within the southwest corner of the Town of Spooner, with a small portion extending into the Town of Beaver Brook on the south, the Town of Bashaw on the southwest, and the Town of Evergreen on the west. The city's nickname, "Crossroads of the North", is a reference to the city's location at the junction of two U.S. highways, 53 and 63, and State Highways 70 and 253.

== History ==
Originally a town in 1889, and officially incorporated as a city in 1909, Spooner's history is closely interlaced with that of railroad history. In 1879, the North Wisconsin Railway was constructed north of the present-day city of Spooner. Following that, the operations of that railroad were moved south where it joined the Chicago and North Western at what was then called Chicago Junction.

The community, then initially only a station, was named by the general superintendent for the Chicago and North Western, Edwin W. Winter, for John Coit Spooner (1843–1919), who was a distinguished railroad attorney from what is now the city of Hudson in St. Croix County, northwestern Wisconsin. Spooner would later serve in the Wisconsin State Assembly and represent Wisconsin in the United States Senate (1885–1891, 1897–1907). He was a well-favored politician of his time and served as advisor to U.S. presidents Benjamin Harrison, William McKinley, and Theodore Roosevelt.

Eventually, the lines were absorbed by the Chicago & North Western Railroad. Passenger service ended in the early 1960s under the CNW ownership. In 1992, the Wisconsin Great Northern Railroad was incorporated, to serve as a freight hauler from Spooner to Trego, a nearby town, with a connection to the CNW. Although the freight idea did not work out, they began operating successful passenger excursion trains in 1997 (following the example of the nearby Duluth & Northern Minnesota Railroad, which began passenger excursions in Duluth only a few years before), and were an instant success. The passenger trains were very successful, and after the 1995 takeover of the CNW by the Union Pacific, in 1998 UP announced intentions to abandon the line from Hayward Junction where it connected to the Wisconsin Central 13 miles (21 km) to the north through Spooner all the way down to Chippewa Falls. The company bought the portion of the line between Spooner and Hayward Junction in 1999, which greatly expanded passenger operations.

To this day they run popular robbery, western style, cowboy, and buffet style as well as more formal dinner trains. More recently, the Great Pumpkin train nearly sold out and now runs annually around the time of Halloween. The old CNW Spooner Railroad Depot now serves as the town's Railroad Memories Museum.

The city was also once the hub of the Omaha Railroad Line. Its economy was once centered on the railroad and the two main lines that joined there.

== Geography ==
According to the United States Census Bureau, the city has a total area of 3.52 square miles (9.12 km^{2}), of which 3.29 square miles (8.52 km^{2}) is land and 0.23 square miles (0.60 km^{2}) is water.

=== Climate ===
Spooner has a humid continental climate (Köppen climate classification Dfb), typical of northern Wisconsin with warm, humid summers and relatively long, cold winters.

Climate data for Spooner, Wisconsin (1991–2020 normals, extremes 1894–present)
Month	Jan	Feb	Mar	Apr	May	Jun	Jul	Aug	Sep	Oct	Nov	Dec	Year
Record high °F (°C)	57 (14)	61 (16)	81 (27)	90 (32)	104 (40)	100 (38)	110 (43)	104 (40)	99 (37)	88 (31)	74 (23)	60 (16)	110 (43)
Mean daily maximum °F (°C)	20.7 (−6.3)	26.4 (−3.1)	39.5 (4.2)	53.7 (12.1)	66.7 (19.3)	76.1 (24.5)	80.1 (26.7)	78.3 (25.7)	69.6 (20.9)	55.6 (13.1)	39 (4)	25.7 (−3.5)	52.6 (11.4)
Daily mean °F (°C)	10.8 (−11.8)	15.4 (−9.2)	28.6 (−1.9)	42.4 (5.8)	55.2 (12.9)	64.9 (18.3)	69 (21)	67.1 (19.5)	58.8 (14.9)	45.8 (7.7)	30.9 (−0.6)	17.5 (−8.1)	42.2 (5.7)
Mean daily minimum °F (°C)	0.9 (−17.3)	4.4 (−15.3)	17.7 (−7.9)	31 (−1)	43.6 (6.4)	53.7 (12.1)	58 (14)	56 (13)	48 (9)	35.9 (2.2)	22.8 (−5.1)	9.2 (−12.7)	31.8 (−0.1)
Record low °F (°C)	−45 (−43)	−46 (−43)	−38 (−39)	−7 (−22)	13 (−11)	22 (−6)	35 (2)	29 (−2)	18 (−8)	2 (−17)	−26 (−32)	−44 (−42)	−46 (−43)
Average precipitation inches (mm)	0.79 (20)	0.8 (20)	1.43 (36)	2.77 (70)	4.08 (104)	4.23 (107)	3.99 (101)	3.9 (99)	3.61 (92)	3.16 (80)	1.66 (42)	1.19 (30)	31.61 (803)
Average snowfall inches (cm)	11.3 (29)	9.6 (24)	9.4 (24)	4.8 (12)	0.4 (1.0)	0 (0)	0 (0)	0 (0)	0 (0)	0.8 (2.0)	6.2 (16)	13.2 (34)	55.7 (141)
Average precipitation days (≥ 0.01 in)	8.1	6.4	7	9.5	11.5	12.1	10.9	10	10	10.3	7.3	9.2	112.3
Average snowy days (≥ 0.1 in)	7.6	6.1	4.3	2.2	0.2	0	0	0	0	0.9	4.6	8.5	34.4
Source: NOAA

== Demographics ==
Historical population
Census	Pop.	Note	%±
1910	1,453		—
1920	2,293		57.8%
1930	2,426		5.8%
1940	2,639		8.8%
1950	2,597		−1.6%
1960	2,398		−7.7%
1970	2,444		1.9%
1980	2,365		−3.2%
1990	2,464		4.2%
2000	2,653		7.7%
2010	2,682		1.1%
2020	2,477		−7.6%
U.S. Decennial Census

=== 2020 census ===
As of the census of 2020, there were 2,573 people, 1,266 households, 669 families, and 1,289 housing units. The racial makeup of the city was 94.9% White, 0.3% African American, 1.4% Native American, 0.6% Asian, 0.65% from other races, and 5% from two or more races. Hispanic or Latino people of any race were 2.7% of the population.

There were 1,266 households, of which 20.5% had children under the age of 18 living with them, 37.2% were married couples living together, 42.7% were living alone, and 47.4% had at least one person 60 years or older. The average household size was 1.97 and the average family size was 2.58.

The median age in the city was 47 years. 20.1% of residents were under the age of 18; 53.2% were between the ages of 18 and 65; and 26.7% were 65 years of age or older. The gender makeup of the city was 50.4% male and 49.6% female.

=== 2010 census ===
As of the census of 2010, there were 2,682 people, 1,180 households, and 666 families residing in the city. The population density was 815.2 inhabitants per square mile (314.8/km^{2}). There were 1,302 housing units at an average density of 395.7 units per square mile (152.8 units/km^{2}). The racial makeup of the city was 95.1% White, 0.3% African American, 1.9% Native American, 0.7% Asian, 0.1% from other races, and 1.9% from two or more races. Hispanic or Latino people of any race were 1.3% of the population.

There were 1,180 households, of which 28.9% had children under the age of 18 living with them, 37.2% were married couples living together, 13.5% had a female householder with no husband present, 5.8% had a male householder with no wife present, and 43.6% were non-families. 38.1% of all households were made up of individuals, and 18.3% had someone living alone who was 65 years of age or older. The average household size was 2.18 and the average family size was 2.84.

The median age in the city was 41.6 years. 23.9% of residents were under the age of 18; 7.8% were between the ages of 18 and 24; 21.5% were from 25 to 44; 25.3% were from 45 to 64; and 21.5% were 65 years of age or older. The gender makeup of the city was 45.6% male and 54.4% female.

=== 2000 census ===
As of the census of 2000, there were 2,653 people, 1,148 households, and 662 families residing in the city. The population density was 875.9 people per square mile (338.2 people/km^{2}). There were 1,249 housing units at an average density of 412.4 units per square mile (159.2 units/km^{2}). The racial makeup of the city was 95.97% White, 0.41% Black or African American, 2.04% Native American, 0.04% Asian, 0.38% from other races, and 1.17% from two or more races. 1.21% of the population were Hispanic or Latino of any race.

There were 1,148 households, out of which 27.4% had children under the age of 18 living with them, 42.4% were married couples living together, 11.1% had a female householder with no husband present, and 42.3% were non-families. 37.8% of all households were made up of individuals, and 20.4% had someone living alone who was 65 years of age or older. The average household size was 2.22 and the average family size was 2.9.

In the city, the population was spread out, with 24% under the age of 18, 7.2% from 18 to 24, 24.3% from 25 to 44, 21.7% from 45 to 64, and 22.8% who were 65 years of age or older. The median age was 41 years. For every 100 females, there were 85.9 males. For every 100 females age 18 and over, there were 77.8 males.

The median income for a household in the city was $27,768, and the median income for a family was $39,677. The median income of its residents was $16,390. About 7.6% of families and 11.9% of the population were below the poverty line, including 12.7% of those under age 18 and 10.5% of those age 65 or over.

== Attractions ==
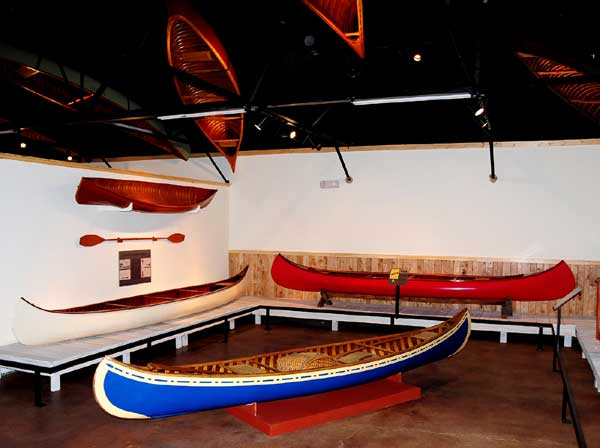
An exhibit hall in the Wisconsin Canoe Heritage Museum. Two canoes built by J. H. Rushton, Canton, New York, are along the left wall, and the red canoe was built by B. N. Morris, Veazie, Maine.

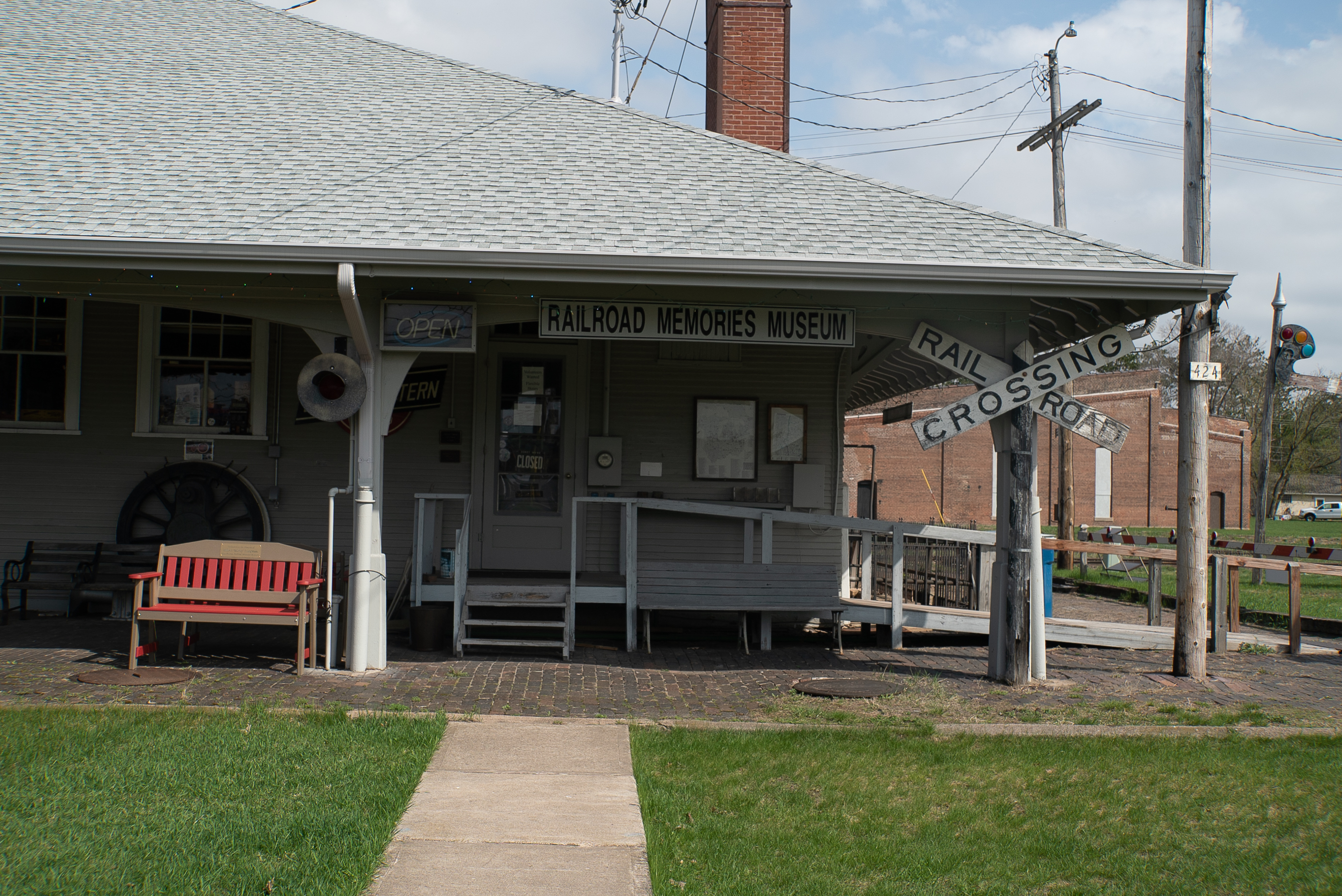
The Railroad Memories Museum is located in the former Chicago & North Western Railroad Depot.

The Wisconsin Canoe Heritage Museum, a museum dedicated to the preservation and interpretation of the cultural heritage of canoes and canoeing in North America, has displays of canoes and canoe-related ephemera.

The Railroad Memories Museum has a large collection of historic material and memorabilia.

Each July since 1954, Spooner has hosted the Heart of the North Rodeo, which draws thousands of fans to the area. In addition to the rodeo each evening, there is a Saturday afternoon parade, live music every night, and the cowboy church service on Sunday morning, held outdoors at the rodeo arena.

The Jack Pine Savage Days is a local festival that features live bands, an annual fun run, a 3 on 3 basketball tournament, a horseshoe tournament, and a volleyball tournament.

Jack O' Lantern Fest is an October festival that revolves around giving back to kids and families. The event includes attractions such as inflatables, fundraising walk, pumpkin roll, pet costume contest, carnival games, baking contest, and pumpkin carving contest.

== Notable people ==
- Guy Benson, mayor and legislator
- Frank Hammill, farmer, mayor, and legislator
- John Lanzendorf, hairstylist, philanthropist, and one of the world's largest collectors of dinosaur art
- Hal O'Halloran, radio announcer and singer
- Travis Randall, actor, musician, and director
- Holger Rasmusen, mayor and legislator
