= Guy Benson (politician) =

American politician (1876-1958)

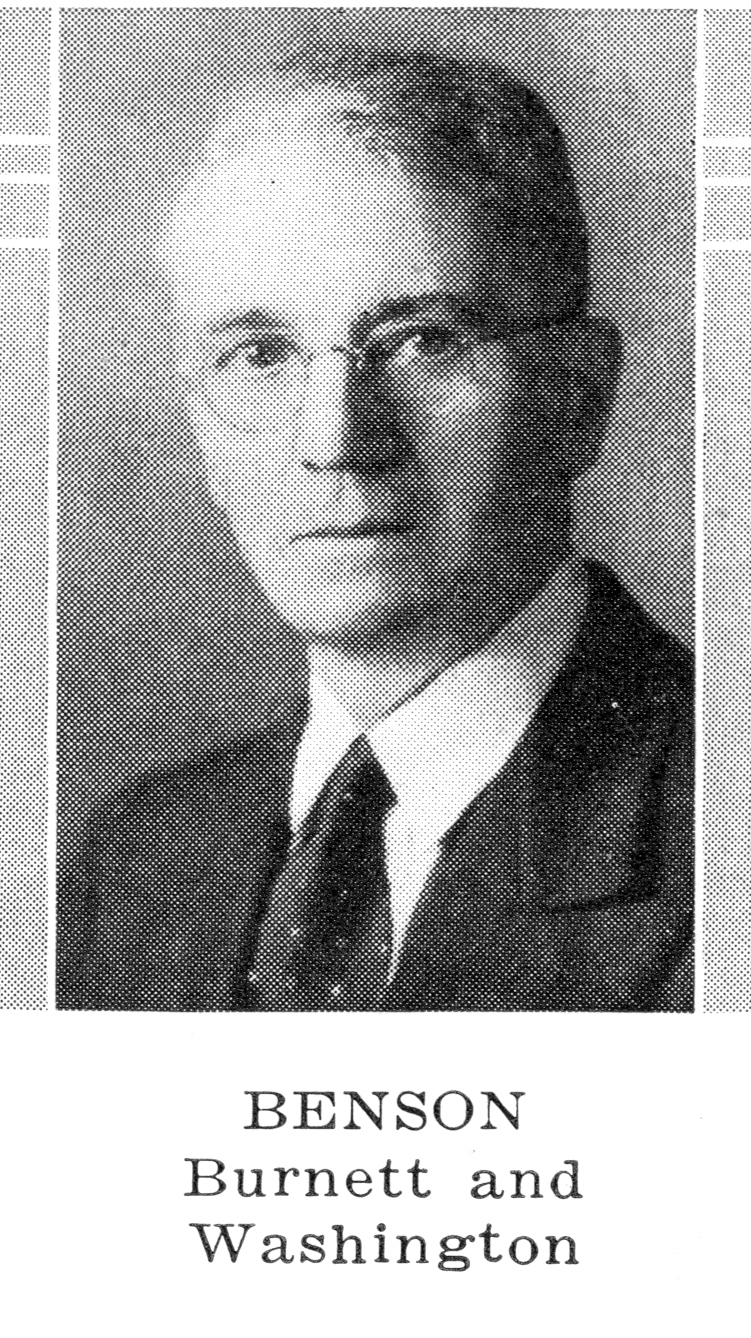
Guy Benson

Guy A. Benson (April 18, 1876 – May 3, 1958) was a member of the Wisconsin State Assembly.

== Biography ==
Benson was born on April 18, 1876, in Jordan, Wisconsin. He attended the University of Wisconsin. He married Anna Holtz in 1903. He died in Phoenix, Arizona in 1958 and was buried in Spooner, Wisconsin.

== Career ==
Benson was a member of the Assembly from 1939 to 1948. Additionally, he was a member of the Washburn County, Wisconsin Board, President of the Spooner, Wisconsin School Board, a Spooner alderman and Mayor of Spooner. He was a Republican.
