= Hal O'Halloran =

American singer

- Born: Harold James O'Halloran; Spooner, Wisconsin, USA
- Occupations: Radio announcer, singer

Harold James O'Halloran was an American radio announcer and a singer.

== Early years ==
O'Halloran was born in Spooner, Wisconsin, and grew up in Fond du Lac, Wisconsin. He began taking vocal lessons in 1924 and in 1926 moved to Chicago with plans to continue his voice studies. However, his relocation to Chicago took him into a career in radio instead.

== Career ==
O'Halloran debuted in radio as a singer at WCFL in Chicago and later became an announcer there. In 1930, he moved to WLS, also in Chicago, working a morning shift. By October 1931, he had become WLS's chief announcer. For five years, he was master of ceremonies for the National Barn Dance on WLS, with two of those years also being broadcast on NBC radio.

In 1934, O'Halloran left WLS to work as an announcer at WOR radio in New York City. He returned to WLS in 1936 and became the announcer for the Chuck Wagon program. Later in the 1930s, he worked at CKLW in Windsor, Ontario. On February 15, 1939, he began working at WLW in Cincinnati, Ohio. He had a morning show there and was co-host of the Boone County Jamboree, a Friday evening stage show that was broadcast on WLW. In January 1946, O'Halloran became the master of ceremonies on Wake Up and Smile, a Saturday morning program on the ABC radio network.

In 1932, O'Halloran won a national contest for announcers. In 1933 he received the Chicago Daily Times' Most Popular Announcer in Chicago award.

One of O'Halloran's specialties was children's programs. While he worked at WCFL, he was one of two speakers on Biographies in Bronze, an educational series about people from history, especially those who explored and settled North America. At WLS, he became Steamboat Bill, and more than 100,000 children enrolled in a club that the station created for his character. At CKLW, his Junior Federation Club had over 200,000 members. At WLW, he was host of a weekday morning program that included children's songs and riddles and "tidy-up time", during which he encouraged young listeners to pick up their clothes and toys.

Besides his work on radio, O'Halloran toured the Eastern United States with a barn dance production After he went to Cincinnati, he made personal appearances with the Boone County Jamboree. in 1949, he was a master of ceremonies on the ABC Barn Dance, a segment of the National Barn Dance that was broadcast on ABC-TV.

O'Halloran led a musical group, Hal O'Halloran's Hooligans, whose instruments included bass, clarinet, fiddle, guitar, harmonica, jug, kazoo, and washboard. The group recorded at least six songs in 1936.

== Personal life ==
O'Halloran was married in 1917. He and his wife had a son and a daughter.
