= Heart of the North Rodeo =

The Heart of the North Rodeo is located in Spooner, Wisconsin, United States. The rodeo takes place the first full weekend in July every year since 1954, except 2020. It is sanctioned by the Professional Rodeo Cowboys Association (PRCA). Fans from all over come to watch the professional cowboys and cowgirls compete in the seven main events of rodeo, and even some up-and-coming little cowboys and cowgirls.

== Barnes PRCA Rodeo Stock Company ==
The Barnes PRCA Rodeo Stock Company has brought the top stock to the Spooner Rodeo since it began in 1954. This family-run business was started and ran by Bob Barnes, who died in 2013. Each year, Barnes stock participates in rodeos all over the United States. It is the longest running rodeo company in the United States. Bob Barnes was named PRCA Stock Contractor of the Year in 1984. He was inducted into the Pro Rodeo Hall of Fame in 1994. Every year, Barnes stock performs at the highest level of professional rodeos across the country.

== Events ==
Mutton busting is the first step into the world of rodeo for the young rodeo enthusiasts. During this event, sheep are held still, mainly in a chute, while a small child is placed on them. The sheep is released and the child is "timed" for how long they can stay on. They are then given a score based on their performance and time. There are no set rules for mutton busting, no national organization, and most events are organized at the local level. The child and sheep safety are always in mind.

Bronc riding: Bareback & saddle bronc riding is an event in which the cowboy rides a horse as it bucks, as if being broke out for the first time. Based on the skills of a working cowboy, breaking a horse, the event is now a highly stylized competition that utilizes horses that often are specially bred for strength, agility, and bucking ability. The rider mounts the horse in a chute, either with a bareback rigging or saddle, and is then released into the arena. The rider must stay on the bronc for at least eight seconds without touching the horse with the free hand. A horse who bucks in a spectacular and effective manner will score more points than a horse who bucks in a straight line with no significant changes of direction. As the ride ends, they are given a score. 80's are good and 90's are exceptional for a bronc ride.

Calf roping, also known as tie-down roping, is when a mounted rider does his best at taking down a running calf. This timed event is for the rider to catch the calf by throwing a lariat around the calf's neck, dismount from the horse, run to the calf, and restrain it by tying three legs together.

Steer wrestling is when a steer is released from the chutes, with one rider guiding the steer in a straight line while on the back of his horse. Another rider, also mounted, will run along the other side and gently jump next to the steer and begin to restrain it until the steer hits the ground.

Team roping is also known as heading and heeling at the rodeo. In this event, a steer is released from the chutes and has two mounted riders trying to rope it. The rider who ropes the front of the steer first is known as the header. The rope is technically supposed to go around both horns of the steer, but lassoing around the neck or one horn is also legal. Once the horn is roped, the second part can occur. The second rider who ropes the rear legs of the steer is known as the heeler. Both legs need to be roped or else a five-second penalty will be given if only one leg is roped.

Barrel racing is a timed event where the cowgirls and their horses race through a cloverleaf pattern. This event is a test of horsemanship in order to control the horse throughout the pattern. A five-second penalty is added for each barrel that is knocked.

Bull riding is the most popular rodeo event. It is when a cowboy rides out a bull as it tries to buck him off. The cowboy must stay on for eight seconds and also rake the bull in a specific way in order to receive a score. Similar to bronc riding, the higher the score, the better. It is a risky sport and has been called "the most dangerous eight seconds" in sports.

=== Activities ===
While waiting for the rodeo to start, fans are welcomed to walk around the grounds to shop at little vendors, most featuring horse and rodeo supplies. The Rodeo Royalty can be found walking around the grounds after the rodeo to sign autographs and take pictures as well. There is also a chance for children under 56 inches to go into the arena for the Nickel Scramble, which is a race to collect nickels. Children get to keep these nickels and some even have special prizes on them. On the Thursday performance, there is the Exceptional Rodeo. This is where children with special needs get the chance to compete in some of the rodeo activities, which are brought down to their level. There is also a band playing right after the rodeo in the concession area. On Sunday, there is the Cowboy church and breakfast, open to anyone, which is followed by the Spooner Rodeo Parade, right down Main Street. The Rodeo ties in many activities, which makes it one of the largest events to go to in Spooner, Wisconsin.
