= Red Blanchard =

American actor and musician (1914–1980)

Donald Francis "Red" Blanchard (July 24, 1914 – 24 February 1980: Age - 65) was an American radio showman, comedian, and country musician.

== Biography ==
He was born in Pittsville, Wisconsin, the third son of William and May (Jackson) Blanchard. In his teens, he learned to play guitar, fiddle, and banjo. Inspired by the "Blue Yodeler" Jimmie Rodgers, he purchased his first guitar at the age of fourteen. In 1930, accompanied by his two older brothers, Hillis and Volney, he made his singing debut on radio station WISN in Milwaukee, Wisconsin, calling himself the "Texas Yodeler". In 1931, he performed in the National Barn Dance at WLS in Chicago as a member of "Rube Tronson's Texas Cowboys". He was married on July 16, 1934, to Lucille Overstake, who later became known under the name of Jenny Lou Carson. The marriage didn't last and they were divorced soon afterwards.

In March 1942, Blanchard was drafted, serving four years in the South Pacific as a combat entertainer of soldiers. A million soldiers saw his concerts and he was awarded six battle stars. After his discharge in 1946, he joined the "Sage Riders", performing on the National Barn Dance. The "Sage Riders" comprised Ray Klein, Dolph Hewitt and Don "Whytsell" White. He was married for the second time in 1946 to Marcella "Sally" Ebert, who was one of the square dancers at the National Barn Dance. In 1950, Blanchard left the "Sage Riders" to concentrate on a solo career. During the 1950s, he hosted the "Red Blanchard Show" and the "Merry-Go-Round Show". He also appeared on shows such as "Smile-A-While" and the "Armed Forces Radio Services" and also worked as an author, publishing books and writing columns for newspapers. In 1959, the National Barn Dance was transferred from WLS to WGN, where it changed name to the WGN Barn Dance. When WGN Barn Dance was cancelled in 1969 Blanchard began an extensive tour of more than 250 engagements a year.

In the 1960s and 1970s, he purchased several radio stations in Illinois and Iowa, with his business partners, Dolph Hewitt and Harry Campbell. During a broadcast from the "Dinner Bell Show" at WLS, he was elected Honorary Mayor of Pittsville, Honorary Chief of Police, and Honorary Chief of the Fire Department, by his hometown of Pittsville. He retired and moved to Florida and died in 1980.

== Sources ==
- Chad Berry, The Hayloft Gang: The Story of the National Barn Dance, 2008, (p. 87)
- Loyal Jones, Country Music Humorists and Comedians, 2008, (p. 78-79)
- Hillbilly-music.com
- Rich Samuels.com
- Medical-mal.com
