= Hoedown (film) =

1950 film by Ray Nazarro

- Theatrical release poster
- Directed by: Ray Nazarro
- Written by: Barry Shipman
- Produced by: Colbert Clark
- Starring: Eddy Arnold; Jeff Donnell; Jock Mahoney; Guinn "Big Boy" Williams; Carolina Cotton
- Cinematography: Fayte M. Browne
- Edited by: Paul Borofsky
- Production company: Columbia Pictures
- Distributed by: Columbia Pictures
- Release date: June 1, 1950
- Running time: 64 minutes
- Country: United States
- Language: English

Hoedown is a 1950 American Western film directed by Ray Nazarro and written by Barry Shipman. The film stars Eddy Arnold, Jeff Donnell, Jock Mahoney, Guinn "Big Boy" Williams and Carolina Cotton. It was released on June 1, 1950, by Columbia Pictures.

== Cast ==
- Eddy Arnold as Eddy Arnold
- Jeff Donnell as Vera Wright
- Jock Mahoney as Stoney Rhodes
- Guinn "Big Boy" Williams as Small Potatoes
- Carolina Cotton as Carolina Cotton
- Hal Hopper as Member of The Pied Pipers
- June Hutton as Member of The Pied Pipers
- Chuck Lowry as Member of The Pied Pipers
- Clark Yocum as Member of The Pied Pipers
- Guy Willis as Member of The Oklahoma Wranglers
- Skeeter Willis as Fiddle Player
- Vic Wills as Member of The Oklahoma Wranglers
- Chuck Wright as Bass Player
