= USS LST-474 =

1943 LST-1-class tank landing ship

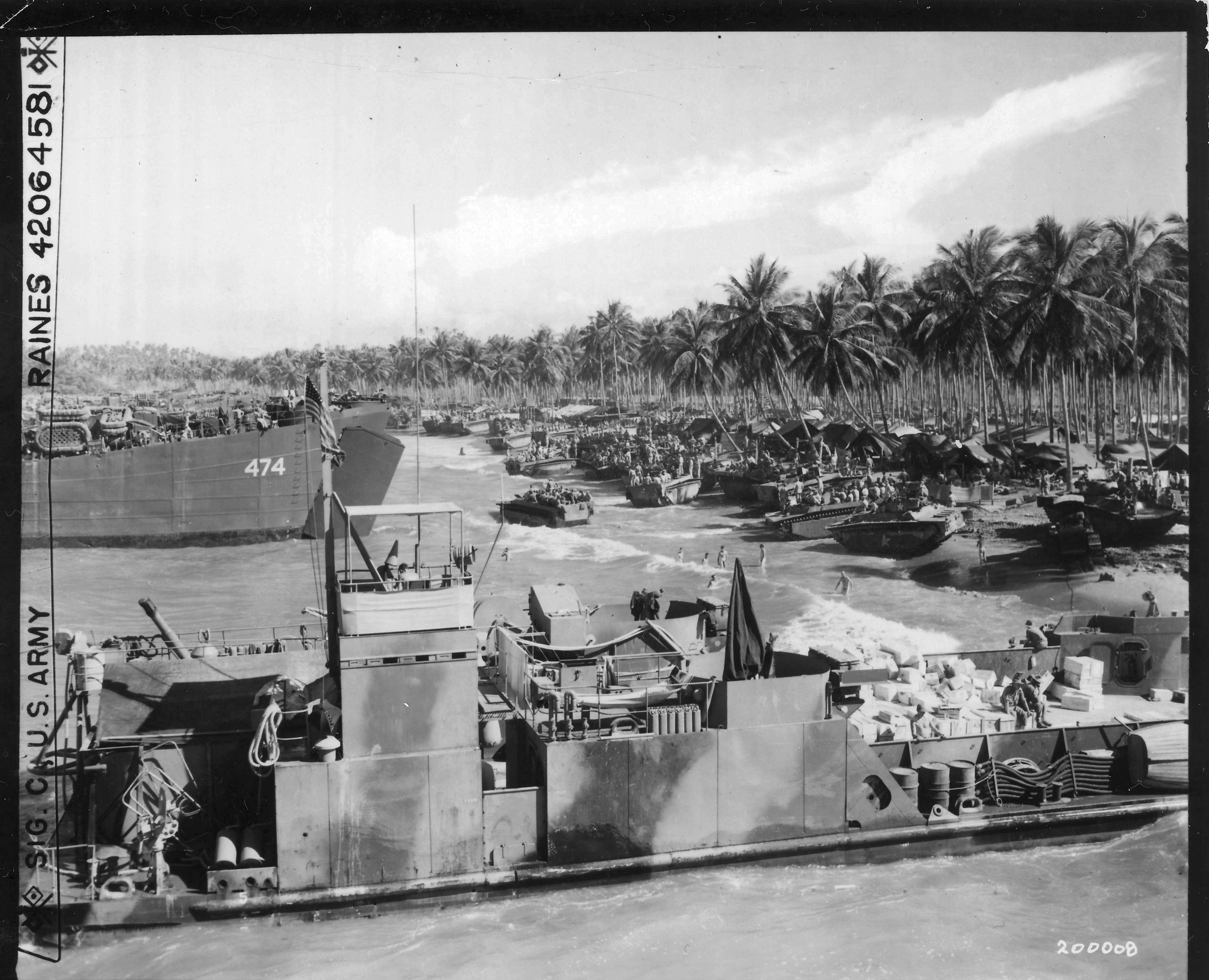
- USS LST-474, beached at Aitape, North East New Guinea, 12 December 1944, while Royal Australian and US forces load men and equipment for an upcoming landing.

History

United States
- Name: LST-474
- Ordered: as a Type S3-M-K2 hull, MCE hull 994
- Builder: Kaiser Shipbuilding Company, Vancouver, Washington
- Yard number: 178
- Laid down: 7 November 1942
- Launched: 12 December 1943
- Commissioned: 19 March 1943
- Decommissioned: 4 March 1946
- Stricken: 22 March 1946
- Identification: Hull symbol: LST-474; Code letters: NGHF
- Honors and awards: 8 × battle stars
- Fate: Sold for scrapping, 17 December 1947

General characteristics
- Class & type: LST-1-class tank landing ship
- Displacement: 4,080 long tons (4,145 t) full load; 2,160 long tons (2,190 t) landing
- Length: 328 ft (100 m) oa
- Beam: 50 ft (15 m)
- Draft: Full load: 8 ft 2 in (2.49 m) forward; 14 ft 1 in (4.29 m) aft; Landing at 2,160 t: 3 ft 11 in (1.19 m) forward; 9 ft 10 in (3.00 m) aft
- Installed power: 2 × 900 hp (670 kW) Electro-Motive Diesel 12-567A diesel engines; 1,700 shp (1,300 kW)
- Propulsion: 1 × Falk main reduction gears; 2 × Propellers
- Speed: 12 kn (22 km/h; 14 mph)
- Range: 24,000 nmi (44,000 km; 28,000 mi) at 9 kn (17 km/h; 10 mph) while displacing 3,960 long tons (4,024 t)
- Boats & landing craft carried: 2 or 6 x LCVPs
- Capacity: 2,100 tons oceangoing maximum; 350 tons main deckload
- Troops: 16 officers, 147 enlisted men
- Complement: 13 officers, 104 enlisted men
- Armament: Varied, ultimate armament; 2 × twin 40 mm (1.57 in) Bofors guns; 4 × single 40 mm Bofors guns; 12 × 20 mm (0.79 in) Oerlikon cannons

Service record
- Part of: LST Flotilla 7
- Operations: Eastern New Guinea operations; Lae occupation (4–5, 9–11 September 1943); Saidor occupation (2–11, 19–22, 28–30 January 1944); Bismarck Archipelago operations; Green Island landing (15–19 February 1944); Hollandia operation (21–25 April 1944); Western New Guinea operations; Biak Islands operation (28–31 May, 3–7, 9–14, 16–20 June 1944); Morotai landing (15 September 1944); Leyte landings (13–27 October, 5–18 November 1944); Lingayen Gulf landings (4–15 January 1945); Consolidation and capture of Southern Philippines; Mindanao Island landings (17–23 April 1945); Borneo operations; Balikpapan operation (28 June–7 July 1945)
- Awards: Combat Action Ribbon; American Campaign Medal; Asiatic–Pacific Campaign Medal; World War II Victory Medal; Navy Occupation Service Medal w/Asia Clasp; Philippine Republic Presidential Unit Citation; Philippine Liberation Medal

USS LST-474 was a United States Navy LST-1-class tank landing ship used in the Asiatic-Pacific Theater during World War II. As with many of her class, the ship was never named. Instead, she was referred to by her hull designation.

== Construction ==
The ship was laid down on 7 November 1942, under Maritime Commission (MARCOM) contract, MC hull 994, by Kaiser Shipyards, Vancouver, Washington; launched 12 December 1942; and commissioned on 19 March 1943.

== Service history ==
During the war, LST-474 was assigned to the Pacific Theater of Operations. She took part in the Eastern New Guinea operations, the Lae occupation in September 1943, and the Saidor occupation in January 1944; the Bismarck Archipelago operations, the Green Island landing in February 1944; Hollandia operation in April 1944; the Western New Guinea operations, the Biak Islands operation in May and June 1944, and the Morotai landing in September 1944; the Leyte operation in October and November 1944; the Lingayen Gulf landings in January 1945; the consolidation and capture of the Southern Philippines, the Mindanao Island landings in April 1945; and the Borneo operation, the Balikpapan operation in June and July 1945.

Following the war, LST-474 performed occupation duty in the Far East in September 1945. She returned to the United States and was decommissioned on 22 March 1946, and struck from the Navy list on 17 April, that same year. On 17 December 1947, the ship was sold to the Ships and Power Equipment Corp., of Barber, New Jersey, and subsequently scrapped.

== Honors and awards ==
LST-474 earned eight battle stars for her World War II service.

== Notes ==
Citations

== Bibliography ==
Online resources

- "LST-474". Dictionary of American Naval Fighting Ships. Naval History and Heritage Command. 3 August 2015. This article incorporates text from this source, which is in the public domain.
- "Kaiser Vancouver, Vancouver WA". www.ShipbuildingHistory.com. 27 November 2010.
- "USS LST-474". NavSource. 31 October 2014.
