= National Barn Dance =

American country music radio program (1924–1968)

Ad

National Barn Dance, broadcast by WLS-AM in Chicago, Illinois starting in 1924, was one of the first American country music radio programs.

National Barn Dance also set the stage for other similar programs, in part because the clear-channel signal of WLS could be received throughout most of the Midwest and even beyond in the late evening and nighttime hours, making much of the United States (and Canada) a potential audience. The program was well received and thus widely imitated, most prominently with the Grand Ole Opry. National Barn Dance ended its broadcast in 1968.

== History ==
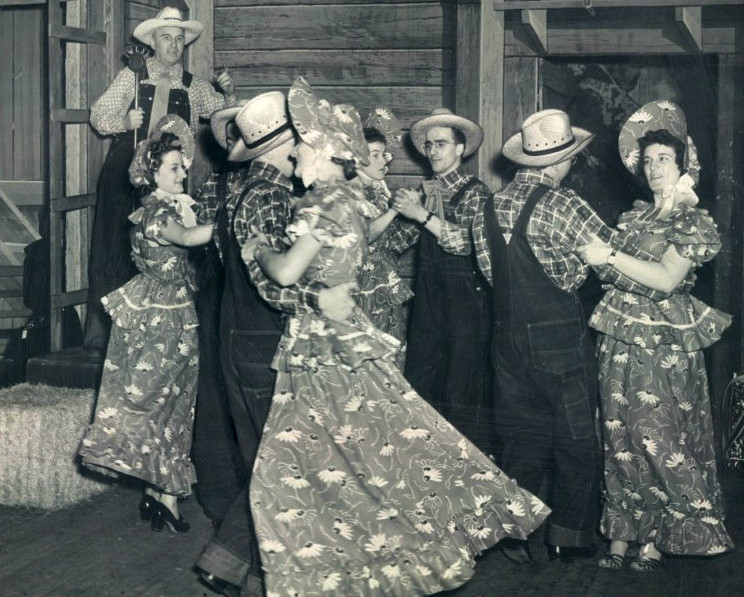
The Barn Dance in 1940

National Barn Dance was founded by Edgar L. Bill, the program director at WLS at the time. Having lived on a farm, he knew how people loved the familiar sound and informal spirit of old-fashioned, "down home" barn dance music. The first broadcast was an impromptu sustaining program. An avalanche of telephone calls and letters indicated a definite demand from the public for this type of broadcast, and National Barn Dance was born. It first aired on WLS on April 19, 1924, and originated from the Eighth Street Theater starting in 1931. The show was picked up by NBC Radio in 1933. NBC expanded the program's coverage in 1942, adding it to the schedules of international broadcast shortwave stations. In 1946, it switched to the ABC Radio Network and aired until 1952 on Saturday nights from 6:30 p.m. to midnight.

George D. Hay, who came from WMC in Memphis, Tennessee and was familiar with barn dances, joined the series a month after its launch as an announcer. His tenure on the program lasted a year and a half before he returned to his native Tennessee—in this case, Nashville—to launch his own version of a barn dance on WSM, which by 1928 he had rebranded as the Grand Ole Opry.

The show regularly featured Gene Autry, Henry Burr, Red Foley, The Three Little Maids, Jenny Lou Carson, Eddie Dean, Lulu Belle and Scotty, Pat Buttram, George Gobel, The Williams Brothers (featuring future crooner Andy Williams), Arkansas Woodchopper, The DeZurik Sisters and the Hoosier Hot Shots. Other guests included Smiley Burnette, Eddie Peabody and Joe Kelly, best remembered today as the host and moderator of NBC's Quiz Kids. The announcer was Jack Holden and it was once sponsored by Alka-Seltzer. The program aired from The Center Theater in Chicago, and people used to stand outside in the snow and cold waiting to get in. The National Barn Dance was the only known radio program to charge an admission fee.

ABC made two moves that ultimately led to National Barn Dance's slow demise. The first was the cancellation of the network broadcast in 1952. After a few years, audiences finally began to wane, and the program ceased live performances after 1957. The show continued to air on WLS until 1959 when ABC bought the station and changed the format to Top 40 rock and roll, canceling National Barn Dance outright. The show moved to Chicago's WGN-AM, with Orion Samuelson as the show's host, until it finally left the air in 1968.

=== Chronology ===
- 1924–33: WLS (AM)
- 1933–46: WLS (AM), carried by NBC Radio
- 1946–52: WLS (AM), carried by ABC Radio
- 1952–60: WLS (AM)
- 1960–68: WGN-AM

== Performers ==
- Herb and Kay Adams
- Rex Allen
- Arkie the Arkansas Woodchopper
- Bob Atcher
- Jimmy Atkins
- Gene Autry
- Charles M. Bardy
- William Bardy
- George Barnes
- Red Blanchard
- Johnny Bond
- Skeeter Bonn
- Bonnie Blue Eyes
- Byron Bouchard
- Smiley Burnette
- Henry Burr
- Pat Buttram
- Jenny Lou Carson
- Jean Chapel
- Uncle Tom Corwin
- Carl Cotner
- Hugh Cross
- Hal Culwer
- Cumberland Ridge Runners
- Stu Davis
- Eddie Dean
- Lola Dee (as Lola Ameche)
- Mary DeZurik
- The Dinning Sisters
- Uncle Ezra
- Sonny Fleming
- Eva Overstake Foley
- Red Foley
- Four Hired Hands
- Verne Fiedler
- Gene and Glenn
- Little Genevieve
- George Gobel
- Dolly Good
- Milly Good
- Jimmy Gross
- Bill Haley
- Billy Haley
- Dolph Hewitt
- The Hilltoppers
- Salty Holmes
- Homer and Jethro
- Hoosier Hot Shots
- Hoosier Sod Busters
- Doc Hopkins
- Ken Houchins
- Chick Hurt
- Don Jacks
- Jimmie James
- Eileen Jensen
- Helen Jensen
- Johnson Sisters
- Karl and Harty
- Pete Kaye
- Joe Kelly
- Chuck Kerner
- Frank Kettering
- Bradley Kincaid
- Lou Klatt
- Augie Klein
- Ray Klein
- John Lair
- Lily May Ledford
- Bonnie Linder
- Connie Linder
- Shorty Long
- Lulu Belle and Scotty
- Mac and Bob
- Bill McCluskey
- Pruth McFarlin
- Clayton McMichen
- Lilly Mae
- Joe Maphis
- Maple City Quartet
- Marjorie Lynn
- Sleepy Marlin
- Esther Martin
- Judy Martin
- Pokey Martin
- Fritz Meissner
- Woody Mercer
- Curley Miller
- Bill Monroe
- Charlie Monroe
- Patsy Montana
- Wally Moore
- Ted Morse
- Ted Moss
- Gerald Myers
- Bill O'Connor
- Hal O'Halloran
- Ole Olsen
- Jimmy Osborne
- Evelyn Overstake
- Lucille Overstake
- Tony Pacione
- Chubby Parker
- Linda Parker
- Pat Patterson
- Eddie Peabody
- Ben Pi-gotti
- Rocky Porter
- Prairie Ramblers
- Lou Prohut
- Andy Reynolds
- Donn Reynolds
- Al Rice
- Jerry Richards
- Marty Roberts
- Buddy Ross
- Gene Ruppe
- Sage Riders
- Bob Shaffer
- The Sackett Sisters—Allee and Laurie
- John Stokes
- Tiny Stokes
- Captain Stubby and the Buccaneers
- Sunshine Sue
- Tom Tanner
- Jack Taylor
- Bob and Bobbie Thomas
- Cousin Tilford
- Rube Tronson
- Al Vlodek
- Cecil and Ethel Ward
- Otto Ward
- Ozzie Waters
- Dan White
- Don White
- Hank Williams Sr.
- Colleen Wilson
- Don Wilson
- Donna Wilson
- Grace Wilson
- Winnie, Lou, and Sally
- Arkansas Woodchopper
- George Workman
- Sam Workman

== Film and TV ==
A fictionalized account of the show's origins, The National Barn Dance (1944), was filmed by director Hugh Bennett from a screenplay by Hal Fimberg and Lee Loeb. The film starred Jean Heather, Charles Quigley, Robert Benchley, Mabel Paige and Charles Dingle, while Pat Buttram and Joe Kelly appeared as themselves. Two acts who were radio show regulars, The Hoosier Hotshots and The Dinning Sisters, also had featured musical spots in the film. Paramount Pictures reportedly paid WLS $75,000 for the rights in 1943.

ABC Barn Dance, a filmed TV series featuring some of the radio performers, was telecast on ABC from February 21–November 14, 1949. Hosted by Jack Stillwell and Hal O'Halloran, the 30-minute musical variety format presented a mix of folk music with country and Western tunes.

In 1964, it became a nationally syndicated program through Mid-America Video Tape Productions, then a subsidiary of television station WGN-TV in Chicago.

== Offshoots ==
In 1925, prior to network radio or syndication, Hay brought his Barn Dance concept to Nashville, Tennessee. The result was a show called the WSM Barn Dance. It became so popular that on December 10, 1927, Hay renamed it the Grand Ole Opry. WSM became one of the first NBC affiliates in 1927, and the Opry is still on the air today.

A second program was launched in the 1930s by National Barn Dance's then-president John Lair in Renfro Valley, Kentucky; the Renfro Valley Barn Dance still takes place weekly but is no longer aired on radio (although a sister program, the Renfro Valley Gatherin', does still air weekly on Sunday mornings).

== Listen to ==
- National Barn Dance (October 2, 1943)
