= Jenny Lou Carson =

American country-music singer-songwriter (1915–1978)

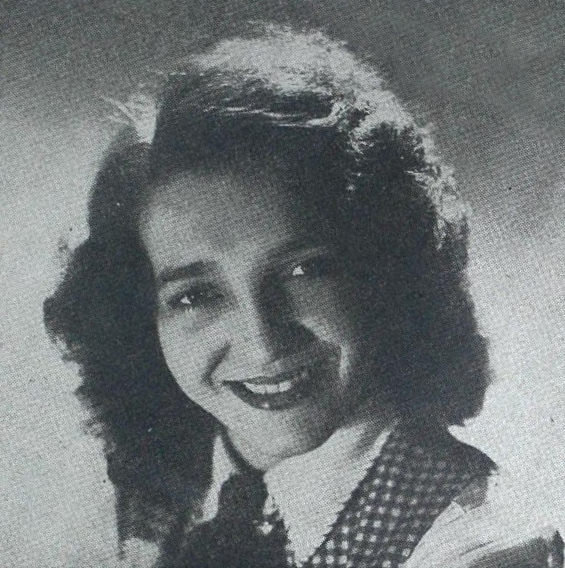
- Jenny Lou Carson in a 1945 advertisement

Background information
- Also known as: Lucille Lee
- Born: Virginia Lucille Overstake; January 13, 1915; Decatur, Illinois, U.S.
- Died: December 16, 1978 (aged 63) Los Angeles, California, U.S.
- Genres: country
- Occupation: Singer-songwriter
- Instruments: Vocals; guitar
- Years active: 1933–1956
- Labels: Columbia; Decca; RCA Victor

Jenny Lou Carson (January 13, 1915 – December 16, 1978), born Virginia Lucille Overstake, was an American country music singer-songwriter and the first woman to write a No. 1 country music hit. From 1945 to 1955 she was one of the most prolific songwriters in country music.

== Early life ==
The second of six children of Herschel Jewel Overstake (1894–1936) and Helen Elizabeth Nalefski (1897–1988), Lucille was born in Decatur, Illinois. She was raised in Decatur in modest surroundings. She learned to work early in life and was expected to do chores around the house. Her father had a strict, no-nonsense personality who instilled a strong work ethic and a fierce win-at-any-cost sense of competition in his children. In her adult life she rarely spoke of her early days to any of her friends or business associates, other than to occasionally remark, "You don't need friends if you've got your family with you."

== Career ==
Carson began her professional music career at age 17 in 1932, performing with her sisters Evelyn and Eva Alaine (AKA: Judy Martin) Overstake as the Three Little Maids on WLS's National Barn Dance in Chicago. Carson also performed briefly as Winnie in the trio Winnie, Lou, and Sally (WLS). The Overstake sisters also performed as The Little Country Girls. From 1938 to 1939 she recorded under the name Lucille Lee with the Sweet Violet Boys, also known as The Prairie Ramblers.

Fashioning herself as a 20th-century Annie Oakley, Overstake assumed the name Jenny Lou Carson in September 1939. She became an expert sharpshooter and learned to spin a rope and manipulate a bullwhip. She toured the state of Texas putting on her cowgirl show and singing with her partner, Texas Tommy.

During World War II she wrote popular songs about soldier boys and home. She was known as the "Radio Chin-Up Girl" and received lots of fan letters from servicemen and their families.

Jenny Lou Carson authored Jealous Heart for Tex Ritter, a song that stayed on the hit charts for 23 weeks in 1945, and You Two-Timed Me One Time Too Often, the first top country hit written by a woman, which stayed at No. 1 on the country chart for 11 weeks in 1945.

Carson wrote a great many songs for a number of country music stars such as Roy Acuff, Eddy Arnold, Ernest Tubb, and Red Foley, who had married her sister Eva. She co-wrote with Al Hill, a pseudonym used by Fred Wise, Kathleen Twomey, and Ben Weisman, the 1954 popular hit Let Me Go, Lover!, first performed by 18-year-old Joan Weber and subsequently recorded by Hank Snow, Teresa Brewer, Peggy Lee, Patti Page, and Sunny Gale.

Her song catalog contains more than 170 songs that have been professionally recorded by more than 180 artists.

== Awards ==
- 1971 Nashville Songwriters Hall of Fame.

== Married life ==
On July 16, 1934, at age 19, she married fellow National Barn Dance performer Donald Francis "Red" Blanchard. The marriage was doomed from the start. They quickly separated and were divorced shortly thereafter. She immediately married 34-year-old Indiana native Myrl "Jack" Dumbauld on November 17, 1936, in Chicago, Illinois. After nine months the marriage was falling apart and they eventually separated several months later. It was not until September 1945 that Carson applied for and was granted a divorce from Dumbauld.

On May 1, 1946, Carson married 39-year-old Harry Lawrence "Tiny" Hill, a successful big band entertainer. The couple had a successful business partnership with Hill performing many of Carson's songs. In January 1947 the Hills purchased a home in Ft. Wayne, Indiana. Their marriage was not successful, and Carson filed for divorce in April 1949; it became final on July 5, 1949. Carson entered her fourth marriage on April 28, 1951, to a 45-year-old Chicago drug store executive named William H. Newman. Within two years Carson left Newman and moved to Texas with her mother.

== Partial list of Carson's songs ==
- Ain'tcha Tired of Makin' Me Blue
- A Pair of Broken Hearts (1945) (Co-written by Fred Rose)
- A Penny for Your Thoughts (1947)
- Another Night is Coming (1950) (Co-written by Moon Mullican)
- Blues in My Heart (1949) (Co-written by Red Foley)
- Chained to a Memory (1946)
- C-H-R-I-S-T-M-A-S (1949) (co-written by Eddy Arnold)
- Darling, What More Can I Do? (1945) (Co-written by Gene Autry)
- Don't Rob Another Man's Castle (1949) (#1 Hit for Eddy Arnold)
- Down by the Rippling Stream (We'll go a-strolling) (1942)
- Echo of Your Footsteps (1949)
- First, Last and Always (1952)
- Foolish tears (1947)
- If I Never Get to Heaven (co-written by Roy Botkin)
- I Left My Heart in Texas (1940)
- I'd Trade All of My Tomorrows (For Just One Yesterday)
- Jealous Heart (1944)
- The Keys to the Kingdom (1952)
- Let Me Go, Lover! (1953) (co-written by A. Hill)
- Lovebug Itch (1950) (co-written by Roy Botkin)
- Many Tears Ago (1945)
- Marriage Vow (1949)
- Never Trust a Woman (1947)
- One Little Tear-drop Too Late (1946)
- Penny for Your Thoughts (1947)
- Someday, There'll Be No Tomorrow (1955)
- The Echo of Your Voice (1952)
- You Two-Timed Me One Time Too Often (1945)
