= The DeZurik Sisters =

American singing duo

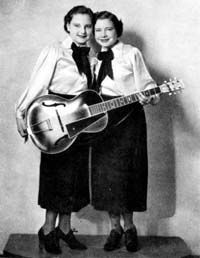
Carolyn (left) and Mary Jane DeZurik

The DeZurik Sisters (also known as The Cackle Sisters) were a country-music duo. They were two of the first women to become stars on both the National Barn Dance and the Grand Ole Opry, largely a result of their original yodeling style.

== Background ==
Born and raised on a farm in Royalton, Minnesota, Mary Jane (February 1, 1917 – 1981) and Carolyn DeZurik (December 24, 1918 – March 16, 2009) were part of a family of seven. Their father Joe played fiddle, their sisters sang, and their brother Jerry played accordion and guitar. Inspired by their family and the sounds of the animals and birds around them, they developed an astonishing repertoire of high, haunting yodels and yips that soon had them winning talent contests all over central Minnesota.

== Career ==
In 1936, the DeZurick Sisters signed a contract to appear regularly on Chicago radio station WLS-AM's National Barn Dance, and were hired in 1937 to perform on Purina Mills' Checkerboard Time radio show, where they sang as The Cackle Sisters.

In 1938, the sisters recorded six songs for Vocalion Records: "I Left Her Standing There" (Vocalion 4616-A), "Arizona Yodeler" (Vocalion 4616-B), "Sweet Hawaiian Chimes" (Vocalion 4704-A), "Guitar Blues" (Vocalion 4704-B), "Go To Sleep My Darling Baby" (Vocalion 4781-A) and "Birmingham Jail" (Vocalion 4781-B). Those six songs were the only tracks the duo would ever commit to shellac, although some recordings exist of their appearances on Checkerboard Time.

In 1940, Mary Jane and Carolyn appeared in Republic Pictures' country musical B movie Barnyard Follies (6 Oct 1940) as The Cackle Sisters.

Both sisters married musicians they had met at WLS. Carolyn accepted a proposal from Ralph "Rusty" Gill, a singer and guitar player, on September 1, 1940, and Mary Jane said yes to Augie Klein, an accordionist, before the month was out. After Gill and Klein were drafted into World War II in 1943, Mary Jane took a break from music to look after her new family and Carolyn joined Sonja Henie's Ice Review for a year or so, afterwards returning to Minnesota for a series of appearances on radio station KSTP-AM. Mary Jane rejoined her sister in 1944, doing road dates with Purina and regular shows at Nashville's Grand Ole Opry.

Rusty was discharged from Army in 1946 and returned to WLS with his old band, the Prairie Ramblers. Mary Jane retired the next year, so Carolyn recruited their sister Lorraine, and the new DeZurik Sisters returned to WLS in Chicago. By 1951, after a stint at Cincinnati's WLW-AM and WLW-TV, Lorraine had retired and Carolyn had joined the Ramblers as their new female vocalist, filling a vacancy created by the absence of trick yodeler Patsy Montana. Carolyn and Rusty moved back to Chicago, where they began appearing with the Ramblers on the daily variety show Chicago Parade, airing on WBBM-TV and WBKB-TV.

== Personal life ==
Carolyn and Rusty lived in the Chicago area. Carolyn died in March 2009. Mary Jane and Augie also lived in the Chicago area. Mary Jane died in 1981. Lorraine married Edward Kosny December 1, 1951 in Oak Park Illinois. She died in 2009. They lived in Renton, Washington.

Years after the height of their fame, Carolyn recalled that the DeZurik Sisters achieved their sound simply because she and Mary Jane "listened to the birds and tried to sing with the birds."
