= Arkansas Woodchopper =

American singer-songwriter

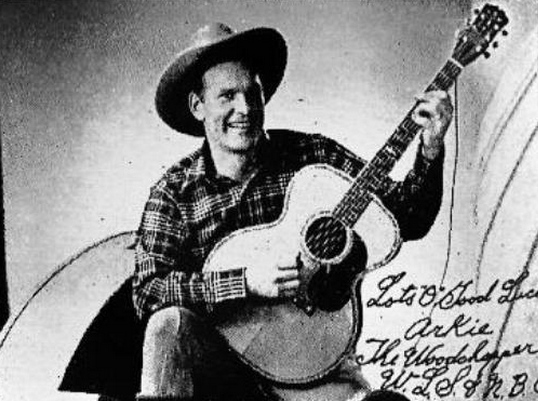
Arkansas Woodchopper c. 1944

Arkansas Woodchopper, or Arkie (b. Luther Ossenbrink, March 2, 1906 - June 23, 1981) was an American country musician.

He was born in the Ozarks near Knob Noster, Missouri, to a family who owned a farm and a general store. He taught himself to play guitar and fiddle so he could play at local square dances, and his first job in music was performing on radio in Kansas City on KMBC in 1928. He started at WLS in 1930, performing on their National Barn Dance, and became one of the show's most popular performers, continuing there until 1959. During this time he also released records for Columbia Records and Conqueror Records. Book of sheet music 'THE ARKANSAS WOODCHOPPER'S WORLD'S GREATEST COLLECTION OF COWBOY SONGS WITH YODEL ARRANGEMENT' copyright 1931 published by M.M. Cole Publishing House, Chicago contains 35 songs, 64 pages. He once performed with Al Trace's orchestra with the song "Why Go Home?" and although his recordings for Columbia, Gennett Records, American Record Corporation, Okeh Records sold well, he never established himself as a major musician.

== Discography ==
Cat. No.	Title	Date	Notes
Champion
45058	I'm In the Jailhouse Now / Frankie and Johnny	1929
45192	Old and Only In the Way / Little Green Valley	1930
Columbia
15463D	The Dying Cowboy / The Cowboy's Dream	1928
20444	Arkansas Traveller / Mississippi Sawyer	1941	Also on Okeh 06296
20445	Sallie Goodwin / Soldier’s Joy	1941	Also on Okeh 06297
20446	Walking Up Town / Waggoner	1941	Also on Okeh 06298
20447	My Love Is But A Lassie / Lightfoot Bill	1941	Also on Okeh 06299
Conqueror
7879	Mrs. Murphy’s Chowder / Frankie and Albert	1931	Frankie and Albert originally by Charley Patton
7880	Sweet Sunny South / If I Could Only Blot Out The Past	1931	Sweet Sunny South originally by Charlie Poole
7881	Just Plain Folks / What Is Home Without Love?	1931
7882	The Last Great Roundup / Cowboy Jack	1931	The Last Great Roundup originally by Cliff Carlisle
7883	I'm A Texas Cowboy / The Bronco That Wouldn’t Bust	1931
7884	When It’s Harvest Time, My Sweet Angeline / Little Green Valley	1931
7885	Old Pal / Daddy and Home	1931
7886	Mary Dow / Little Blossom	1931
7887	Little Ah-Sid / Dollar Down And A Dollar A Week With Chicken Pie	1931
