= Donna Wilson =

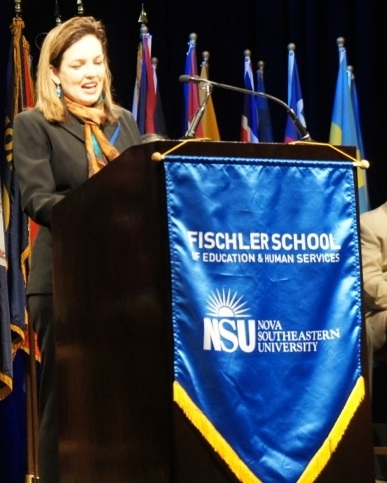
Donna Wilson

Donna Wilson is an educational and school psychologist, teacher educator, and author of 20 books applying mind, brain, and education science. Wilson is the head of academic affairs of the Center for Innovative Education and Prevention (CIEP) and BrainSMART. She presents at educational conferences in the United States and internationally and blogs regularly on Edutopia. She serves as advisor to New York City's Portfolio School and on the foundation of Carl Albert State College.

Wilson completed her postdoctoral studies in structural cognitive modifiability prior to developing a graduate program putting cognitive research into practice while she served as chair of education at the University of Detroit Mercy. As a former classroom teacher, Wilson's professional focus is on empowering educators with opportunities for learning how to align teaching practices with current research about how students learn. She was lead developer of the Master of Science and Educational Specialist degree programs with a major in Brain-Based Teaching and the doctoral minor degree in Brain-Based Leadership with the Abraham S. Fischler School of Education at Nova Southeastern University.

== Education and professional experience ==
Wilson earned her PhD in Educational Psychology from the University of Oklahoma and is a Nationally Certified School Psychologist (NCSP). She also completed postdoctoral studies at the International Center for the Enhancement of Learning Potential with Reuven Feuerstein and Alex Kozulin.

As an assistant professor in the Psychology Department at Valdosta State University, Wilson began her university career as a teacher educator at the undergraduate level. She later chaired the Education Department at the University of Detroit Mercy, where she codeveloped a unique cohort and field-based master's degree for teachers with a focus on cognition and motivation in diverse classrooms. Wilson co-led two educational research projects: (1) the implementation of a brain-based teaching approach supported by a Challenge Grant from the Annenberg Foundation with Florida Atlantic University and (2) a three-year Florida Department of Education initiative on brain-based teaching, Scholarships for Teachers in Action Research (STAR). The effectiveness of the latter initiative led to the development of Master of Science and Educational Specialist degrees with a major in Brain-Based Teaching through Nova Southeastern University. Wilson considers brain-based teaching to be an approach to instruction that acknowledges that learning may change the structure and function of the brain and that educational and cognitive research can be used to enhance classroom teaching practice.

=== Selected recent publications ===
- Conyers, M. A., & Wilson, D. L. (2016). Smarter teacher leadership: Neuroscience and the power of purposeful collaboration. New York, NY: Teachers College Press.
- Conyers, M. A., & Wilson, D. L. (2015). Positively smarter: Science and strategies for increasing happiness, achievement, and well-being. West Sussex, UK: Wiley Blackwell.
- Conyers, M. A., & Wilson, D. L. (2015, May). Smart moves: Powering up the brain with physical activity. Phi Delta Kappan, 96(8), 38-42. doi: 10.1177/0031721715583961
- Wilson, D. L., & Conyers, M. A. (2018). Introduction to BrainSMART teaching: Science, structures, and strategies for increasing student learning. Cheltenham, Australia: Hawker Brownlow Education.
- Wilson, D. L., & Conyers, M. A. (2016). Teaching students to drive their brains: Metacognitive strategies, activities, and lesson ideas. Alexandria, VA: ASCD.
- Wilson, D. L., & Conyers, M. A. (2014, October). The boss of my brain. Educational Leadership, 72(2). Retrieved from http://www.ascd.org/publications/educational-leadership/oct14/vol72/num02/%C2%A3The-Boss-of-My-Brain%C2%A3.aspx
- Wilson, D. L., & Conyers, M. A. (2014). The five new cognitive complexities that teachers confront. In R. Sylwester & D. Moursund (Eds.), Understanding and mastering complexity (pp. 80–83). Eugene, OR: Information Age Education.
- Wilson, D. L., & Conyers, M. A. (2013). Five big ideas for effective teaching: Connecting mind, brain, and education research to classroom practice. New York, NY: Teachers College Press.
- Wilson, D. L., & Conyers, M. A. (2013). Flourishing in the first five years: Connecting implications from mind, brain, and education research to the development of young children. Lanham, MD: Rowman and Littlefield Education.
- Wilson, D. L., & Conyers, M. C. (2011). BrainSMART 60 strategies for increasing student learning (4th ed.). Orlando, FL: BrainSMART.
- Wilson, D. L., & Conyers, M. A. (2011). Thinking for results: Strategies for increasing student achievement by as much as 30 percent (4th ed.). Orlando, FL: BrainSMART.
- Wilson, D. L., & Conyers, M. A. (2010). Courageous learners: Increasing student achievement in diverse learning communities (3rd ed.). Orlando, FL: BrainSMART.
- Wilson, D. L., & Conyers, M. A. (2010). Wiring the brain to read: Higher-order thinking for reading. Orlando, FL: BrainSMART.
