= Hoosier Hot Shots =

American quartet

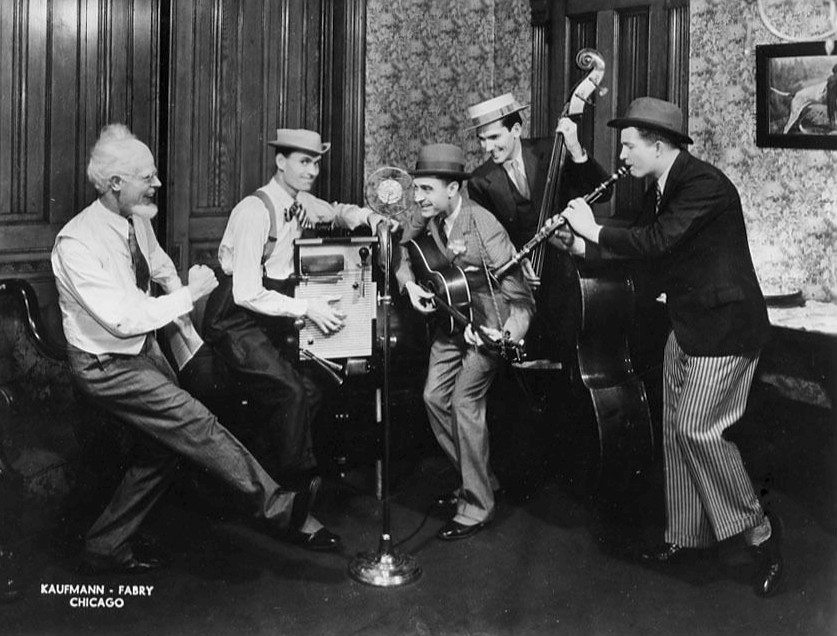
- The Hoosier Hot Shots with Uncle Ezra (announcer Pat Barnett, at left) publicity photo for the National Barn Dance, 1935

Background information
- Origin: Indiana, U.S.
- Genres: Swing, comedy, country, old-time, novelty songs
- Years active: 1932–1979
- Labels: Banner, Conqueror, Decca, Melotone, Oriole, Perfect, Romeo, Vocalion, Viking, Tops, Dot
- Past members: Ken Trietsch (1932-1979); Hezzie Trietsch (1932-1979); Gabe Ward (1932-1979); Frank Kettering (1934-1944); Gil Taylor; Nate Harrison; Keith Milheim
- Website: hoosierhotshots.com

The Hoosier Hot Shots were an American quartet of "rural rhythm" musicians who entertained on stage, screen, radio, and records from 1932 to 1979. The group inspired an entire musical genre of comic novelties that thrived during the 1930s and '40s.

In 1946 Variety commented on the appeal and longevity of "those old washboard-pounders The Hoosier Hot Shots, predecessors of Spike Jones, the Korn Kobblers, Freddie Fisher, etc. They've been peddling their own brand of corn via the airwaves for years now, so anybody who has the audacity to criticize their ear-blasting tintinnabulations has also got to be reminded that they've made a wonderful living out of it."

== Members ==
The original lineup consisted of:

- Ken Trietsch (born in Arcadia, Indiana) (September 13, 1903 - September 17, 1987)
- Hezzie Trietsch (born Paul Trietsch in Arcadia, Indiana) (April 11, 1905 - April 20, 1980)
- Gabe Ward (born Charles Otto Ward in Knightstown, Indiana) (November 26, 1904 - January 14, 1992)
- Frank Kettering (born in Monmouth, Illinois) (January 1, 1909 - June 9, 1973)

with the following replacements:

- Gil Taylor (born Gilbert Ossian Taylor in Holly Pond, Alabama) (Feb. 2, 1914 - July 5, 1981)
- Nate Harrison (born Nathan Harrison) (August 19, 1907 - August 10, 1995)
- Keith Milheim (born in Van Wert, Ohio) (1922 - 2002)

Their standard instrumentation was guitar (Ken), clarinet (Gabe), string bass (Frank, later Gil), and a strange, homemade instrument known both as the "Wabash Washboard" and "the Zither," played by Hezzie. It was a corrugated, sheet-metal washboard on a metal stand with various noisemakers attached, including bells and a multi-octave range of squeeze-type bicycle horns; Hezzie Trietsch constructed this instrument himself. Hezzie could also play melodies and effects on a slide whistle. The washboard, along with other memorabilia from the band, is now in the collection of the Indiana State Museum.

Their music was characterized by novelty songs and arrangements (like "I Like Bananas (Because They Have No Bones)" and "From the Indies to the Andes in His Undies"), hot-jazz rhythm numbers, and occasional ballads. They also played the pop songs of the day, like "Nobody's Sweetheart."

== Beginnings in vaudeville and radio ==
The nucleus of the act was the Trietsch brothers, Ken and Paul, who grew up on their family's farm near Arcadia, Indiana, about 20 miles north of Indianapolis. The Trietsch family grew to be one of four girls and five boys.

Guided by the example of a banjo-playing father, Ken, Paul, and the other Trietsch children developed a keen interest in music and developed their various talents. Although Ken attended Dayton Electrical Engineering College, he pursued a career in show business. Ken and Paul began performing professionally in 1918 as part of Ezra Buzzington's Rube Band (led by Mark Schaefer as "Ezra" and later known as The Rustic Revelers), a hillbilly ensemble that toured American and Canadian vaudeville circuits. It was while touring with the Rube Band that they met another Hoosier, former bandleader Charles Ward, who had adopted the stage name of Gabriel Hawkins. They joined forces as a trio and became The Trietsch Brothers and Ward.

When the advent of talking motion pictures sharply curtailed vaudeville, maestro Mark Schaefer decided to retire and disbanded the Rube Band in 1929, leaving The Trietsch Brothers and Ward unemployed. They became salesmen for a Montgomery Ward store in Ohio, and continued playing their music at public venues on weekends.

Their radio debut was accidental. In January 1932 they appeared on a benefit show for the American Red Cross, broadcast on station WOWO in Fort Wayne, Indiana. "There was a tremendous flood in the Ohio River Valley," recalled Gabe Ward. "We went on WOWO in Fort Wayne as a charity, getting people to pledge one dollar a song for flood relief. Just the slide whistle, clarinet, and banjo." They were the hit of the evening, and WOWO gave them their own program. One day the musicians were running late and arrived just in time for a performance. The announcer greeted them with "Hey, you hot shots, get in here!" The boys enjoyed that and called each other "hot shot" for days, and within a week they were The Three Hot Shots. When they appeared at the 1933 World's Fair they were calling themselves The Hoosier Hot Shots, which became their permanent identification.

== As featured on National Barn Dance ==
On the strength of their World's Fair appearance. they were invited to audition for Chicago radio station WLS, the "Prairie Farmer Station". "When we auditioned," said Gabe Ward, "they told us we were too wild. They said, 'You don't yodel. You don't play fiddle. We don't know if you'll go on our station or not.' So the booking office put us on a fair show in Saginaw, Michigan, and we went over so well that the booking office signed us up, and the booking office got us on WLS on Saturday nights." This was the WLS Barn Dance, a popular program of hillbilly and novelty acts that had been on the air since 1924. As a promotional gimmick, station manager Glenn Snyder and station talent manager Clementine Legge booked the entire WLS Barn Dance troupe into dozens of personal appearances at regional theaters.

The Hoosier Hot Shots became a quartet in August 1934, with Ward recruiting former Sousa band musician Frank Kettering on string bass. The group remained a quartet for the next four decades.

In 1933 the WLS Barn Dance was picked up by the NBC network and became the National Barn Dance, sponsored by Miles Laboratories' Alka-Seltzer. In the late 1930s, Miles spun off a five-minute radio show for NBC stations, starring the Hoosier Hot Shots.

== Recording and film career ==
Their very first record was made at the Gennett Records studio in Indiana: "The Cheer Parade" and "Virginia Blues". Ken Trietsch kicked off the band with a shout to his brother Paul: "Are... you... ready, Hezzie?" This became the band's signature introduction and a popular catchphrase. The band sent copies of the record to local radio stations, in an effort to promote their live performances.

Over their career, the Hoosier Hot Shots made hundreds of 78-rpm records for such labels as Banner, Conqueror, Decca, Melotone, Oriole, Perfect, Romeo, and Vocalion. Some of their early records feature vocals by Skip Farrell. Farrell was never a member of the Hoosier Hot Shots; he was the house baritone on the Barn Dance radio show.

They were an ongoing presence in the early Billboard country (hillbilly) charts with songs like "Beer Barrel Polka", "When There Are Tears in the Eyes of the Potato", "Everybody Loves My Baby", and "O-Hi-O". One of their record producers avoided recording multiple takes of their performances, preferring a spontaneous sound: according to one member, the producer would record no more than two takes of a particular song, and use the one that sounded worse.

Between 1937 and 1950, the Hoosier Hot Shots appeared in more than 20 feature films, sharing billing with Gene Autry, Dale Evans, Bob Wills, The Three Stooges, and Merle Travis. They also appeared in three Soundies, three-minute musical films produced for "movie jukeboxes" of the 1940s. In addition to their professional obligations, they appeared on four different radio series heard only by military personnel, and in 1942 they toured for the USO in North Africa and Italy. The USO tour concluded stateside, including a memorable visit to the Gardner General Hospital in Chicago. Gabe Ward recalled: "We played in a room where there was just one fellow. He was a serious case, bandaged all over except for his face and one toe. The nurses were glad when they saw that one toe keeping time to our music."

== Change in personnel ==
The 35-year-old Frank Kettering left the quartet, intending to join the U. S. Army. Evidently his wife Suzanne, with two children at home, considered his recruitment a form of abandoning his responsibilities, and she filed for divorce. It was granted, on the grounds of desertion, on January 13, 1944. Now a free agent, Kettering reported to Fort Lee, Virginia on Feb. 4, 1944.

Kettering was replaced by singer-bassist Gil Taylor, originally from Alabama. He was then a member of a nightclub comedy act, The LeDonne Trio, alongside Michael LeDonne and Art Burge.

Paramount Pictures made a film version of The National Barn Dance (1944), with the Hoosier Hot Shots as a specialty act. In April 1944 they signed a two-year contract with Columbia Pictures for their own series of musical westerns; "We split $17,500 four ways per movie," said Gabe Ward. Columbia extended the contract for another two years. Although the band stopped making Columbia features in 1948, the studio kept the Hot Shots features in circulation through the late 1950s.

In 1946 the Hoosier Hot Shots left the National Barn Dance radio show after 13 years to devote more time to their movie career. In July the band members and their families formed a seven-car caravan and drove to California, where they settled permanently.

Also in 1946, the Hoosier Hot Shots starred in a series of 156 15-minute radio shows for World Broadcasting, called The Corncert Kings. This was syndicated to local radio stations on transcription records. What made this unusual was that only the Hot Shots' music was recorded. The spoken portions were read by each station's local announcer, from scripts provided by the syndicator. This allowed stations to tailor the broadcasts to local sponsors, and gave the illusion that the Hoosier Hot Shots were appearing live at each studio. Also, the musical performances weren't even new; they were drawn from the syndicator's library of transcriptions and compiled by script writer Mary Buchanan.

== Later years ==
The loss of their Columbia movie contract forced the Hoosier Hot Shots to find employment elsewhere. In 1949 they began touring movie theaters as a headline vaudeville act (Variety reported that a February 1950 engagement in Seattle, Washington made a "great $11,000" for the week). In 1950 they made a guest appearance in their last motion picture, Hollywood Varieties, produced by Robert L. Lippert. In this simulation of a vaudeville revue, they appeared as the closing act -- reprising two songs from their 1946 feature Singing on the Trail -- and were billed as the film's stars, alongside master of ceremonies Robert Alda. They also had a late-Saturday-night radio series for the Mutual Broadcasting System, which aired during 1949 and 1950. In July 1950 they made their television debut headlining a musical variety show, broadcast on KTSL-TV in Los Angeles.

Nationwide exposure continued into 1951 with a primetime appearance on NBC-TV's Four Star Revue and a syndicated series of five Snader Telescriptions. Then the national momentum slowed, and by 1952 the band took on live engagements in nightclubs and state fairs. They were reunited with their Columbia co-star Carolina Cotton at the Last Frontier nightclub in Las Vegas, Nevada.

In January 1953 the Evansville Press of Evansville, Indiana, printed a profile of the group, claiming that Gil Taylor was nicknamed "Sleepy" because of his deadpan, slow-moving ways. It appears that his bandmates picked up on this and playfully called Taylor "Sleepy", to his dismay. Taylor suddenly left the group and would not return for 15 months. He was replaced temporarily by bass player Nate Harrison. Harrison accompanied the band on a tour of 18 state and county fairs in southern California in 1953.

Gil Taylor returned to the Hot Shots in April 1954. One year later they joined the cast of a local TV series, Western Varieties, out of KTLA-TV in Los Angeles. This prompted their being signed for the country-music show Ranch Party (1957), a filmed version of the successful Town Hall Party; the filmed episodes were produced and syndicated by Columbia's TV subsidiary, Screen Gems.

Throughout 1959 the Hoosier Hot Shots were resident entertainers at the upscale Holiday Hotel in Reno, Nevada.

The Hoosier Hot Shots' career was winding down in the 1960s. Bass player Gil Taylor retired, and his temporary replacement Nate Harrison returned to the group permanently. The Hot Shots continued playing live venues and recording sessions (adding a drummer, Keith Milheim). Their last new album, in stereo, was "Are You Ready, Hezzie?", released by Dot Records in 1966. Thereafter their records were confined to reissues and compilation albums.

The Hoosier Hot Shots played their final engagements in 1979, in Las Vegas and at Knott's Berry Farm in California. They retired the act when Hezzie Trietsch became too ill to perform; he died of cancer on April 20, 1980. Frank Kettering died on June 9, 1973; his successor Gil Taylor died on July 5, 1981. Ken Trietsch followed on September 17, 1987. Gabe Ward continued to perform solo (as "Mr. Hoosier Hot Shot") after his bandmates had died or retired, until shortly before his own death on January 14, 1992.

== Legacy ==
The Hoosier Hot Shots were the originators of "rural rhythm". Among the acts the followed the Hot Shots were the Freddie Fisher's Schnickelfritz Band, the Korn Kobblers, and Spike Jones and His City Slickers. Spike Jones's early recordings were heavily influenced by the Hoosier Hot Shots; "Oh! By Jingo" had itself been recorded by the Hot Shots in 1939. Both Jones and Fisher copied the "Wabash Washboard" invented by Hezzie Trietsch.

Latter-day proponents like "Weird Al" Yankovic and John Lithgow (who recorded a cover of "From the Indies to the Andes in His Undies" as well as "I Like Bananas Because They Have No Bones"), have kept the memory of the Hoosier Hot Shots alive. English rock band Half Man Half Biscuit alluded to the Hoosier Hot Shots in their song "Eno Collaboration" with the lyric "I went from the Andes to the Indies in my undies".
