= List of American films of 1942 =

More than 488 American feature films were released in 1942.

Bob Hope hosted the 15th Academy Awards ceremony at the Ambassador Hotel in Los Angeles. The winner of the Outstanding Motion Picture (later: Best Picture) category was MGM's Mrs. Miniver.

The other nine nominated pictures were 49th Parallel; Kings Row; The Magnificent Ambersons; The Pied Piper; The Pride of the Yankees; Random Harvest; The Talk of the Town; Wake Island; and Yankee Doodle Dandy.

Casablanca was released in 1942, but won its three Oscars in 1944.

== A-B ==
Title	Director	Cast	Genre	Notes
A-Haunting We Will Go	Alfred L. Werker	Stan Laurel, Oliver Hardy, Dante the Magician, Sheila Ryan	Comedy	20th Century Fox
Across the Pacific	John Huston	Humphrey Bogart, Mary Astor, Sydney Greenstreet, Charles Halton	Thriller	Warner Bros.
The Adventures of Martin Eden	Sidney Salkow	Glenn Ford, Claire Trevor, Evelyn Keyes	Drama	Columbia
The Affairs of Jimmy Valentine	Bernard Vorhaus	Dennis O'Keefe, Ruth Terry, Gloria Dickson	Mystery	Republic
The Affairs of Martha	Jules Dassin	Marsha Hunt, Richard Carlson, Marjorie Main	Romance	MGM
Alias Boston Blackie	Lew Landers	Chester Morris, Adele Mara, George E. Stone	Mystery	Columbia
All Through the Night	Vincent Sherman	Humphrey Bogart, Conrad Veidt, Kaaren Verne	Thriller	Warner Bros.
Almost Married	Charles Lamont	Jane Frazee, Robert Paige, Eugene Pallette	Comedy	Universal
Along the Sundown Trail	Sam Newfield	Bill Boyd, Lee Powell, Julie Duncan	Western	PRC
Always in My Heart	Jo Graham	Kay Francis, Walter Huston, Gloria Warren	Drama	Warner Bros.
American Empire	William C. McGann	Richard Dix, Leo Carrillo, Preston Foster, Frances Gifford	Western	Paramount
Andy Hardy's Double Life	George B. Seitz	Lewis Stone, Mickey Rooney, Fay Holden	Comedy	MGM
Apache Trail	Richard Thorpe	Lloyd Nolan, Donna Reed, Ann Ayars	Western	MGM
Arabian Nights	John Rawlins	Maria Montez, Jon Hall, Sabu	Adventure	Universal
Are Husbands Necessary?	Norman Taurog	Ray Milland, Betty Field, Patricia Morison	Comedy	Paramount
Arizona Roundup	Robert Emmett Tansey	Tom Keene, Frank Yaconelli	Western	Monogram
Arizona Stage Coach	S. Roy Luby	Ray Corrigan, Max Terhune, Nell O'Day	Western	Monogram
Arizona Terrors	George Sherman	Don "Red" Barry, Lynn Merrick	Western	Republic
Army Surgeon	A. Edward Sutherland	Jane Wyatt, James Ellison, Kent Taylor	Drama	RKO
Atlantic Convoy	Lew Landers	Bruce Bennett, Virginia Field, Larry Parks, Lloyd Bridges	War	Columbia
Baby Face Morgan	Arthur Dreifuss	Mary Carlisle, Richard Cromwell, Robert Armstrong	Comedy crime	PRC
Bad Men of the Hills	William Berke	Charles Starrett, Russell Hayden, Luana Walters	Western	Columbia
Bambi	David Hand		Animated	RKO, Disney
Bandit Ranger	Lesley Selander	Tim Holt, Joan Barclay	Western	RKO
The Bashful Bachelor	Malcolm St. Clair	Lum and Abner, ZaSu Pitts	Comedy	RKO
Behind the Eight Ball	Edward F. Cline	Carol Bruce, Dick Foran	Comedy	Universal Pictures
Bells of Capistrano	William Morgan	Gene Autry, Virginia Grey	Western	Republic
Below the Border	Howard Bretherton	Buck Jones, Tim McCoy, Raymond Hatton	Western	Monogram
Berlin Correspondent	Eugene Forde	Virginia Gilmore, Dana Andrews, Mona Maris	Thriller	20th Century Fox
Between Us Girls	Henry Koster	Diana Barrymore, Robert Cummings, Kay Francis	Comedy	Universal
Beyond the Blue Horizon	Alfred Santell	Dorothy Lamour, Richard Denning, Patricia Morison	Adventure	Paramount
The Big Shot	Lewis Seiler	Humphrey Bogart, Irene Manning	Crime	Warner Bros.
The Big Street	Irving Reis	Henry Fonda, Lucille Ball, Barton MacLane	Drama	RKO
Billy the Kid's Smoking Guns	Sam Newfield	Buster Crabbe, Al St. John, Joan Barclay	Western	PRC
Billy the Kid Trapped	Sam Newfield	Buster Crabbe, Anne Jeffreys	Western	PRC
Black Dragons	William Nigh	Bela Lugosi, Joan Barclay, Robert Frazer	Thriller	Monogram
The Black Swan	Henry King	Tyrone Power, Maureen O'Hara, Laird Cregar	Adventure	20th Century Fox
Blondie's Blessed Event	Frank R. Strayer	Penny Singleton, Arthur Lake, Jonathan Hale	Comedy	Columbia
Blondie Goes to College	Frank R. Strayer	Penny Singleton, Arthur Lake, Janet Blair	Comedy	Columbia
Blondie for Victory	Frank R. Strayer	Penny Singleton, Arthur Lake, Stuart Erwin	Comedy	Columbia
Blue, White and Perfect	Herbert I. Leeds	Lloyd Nolan, Mary Beth Hughes, Helene Reynolds	Mystery	20th Century Fox
Bombay Clipper	John Rawlins	William Gargan, Maria Montez, Irene Hervey	Thriller	Universal
Bombs Over Burma	Joseph H. Lewis	Anna May Wong, Noel Madison	War	PRC
The Boogie Man Will Get You	Lew Landers	Boris Karloff	Comedy; Horror	Columbia
Boot Hill Bandits	S. Roy Luby	Ray Corrigan, Max Terhune, Jean Brooks	Western	Monogram
Border Roundup	Sam Newfield	George F. Houston, Dennis Moore	Western	PRC
Born to Sing	Edward Ludwig	Virginia Weidler, Douglas McPhail	Musical	MGM
The Boss of Big Town	Arthur Dreifuss	Florence Rice, John Litel, H. B. Warner	Crime	PRC
Boss of Hangtown Mesa	Joseph H. Lewis	Johnny Mack Brown, Fuzzy Knight, William Farnum	Western	Universal
Boston Blackie Goes Hollywood	Michael Gordon	Chester Morris, Constance Worth	Mystery	Columbia
Bowery at Midnight	Wallace Fox	Bela Lugosi, John Archer, Wanda McKay	Horror	Monogram
Broadway	William A. Seiter	George Raft, Pat O'Brien, Janet Blair	Crime musical	Universal
Broadway Big Shot	William Beaudine	Ralph Byrd, Virginia Vale, Herbert Rawlinson	Drama	PRC
Brooklyn Orchid	Kurt Neumann	William Bendix, Grace Bradley	Comedy	United Artists
The Bugle Sounds	S. Sylvan Simon	Wallace Beery, Marjorie Main, Donna Reed	War	MGM
Bullet Scars	D. Ross Lederman	Regis Toomey, Howard Da Silva, Adele Longmire	Crime drama	Warner Bros.
Bullets for Bandits	Wallace Fox	Tex Ritter, Wild Bill Elliott	Western	Columbia
Busses Roar	D. Ross Lederman	Richard Travis, Julie Bishop, Eleanor Parker	Crime drama	Warner Bros.
Butch Minds the Baby	Albert S. Rogell	Virginia Bruce, Broderick Crawford, Dick Foran	Comedy	Universal

== C-D ==
Title	Director	Cast	Genre	Notes
Cadets on Parade	Lew Landers	Freddie Bartholomew, Jimmy Lydon, Raymond Hatton	Drama	Columbia
Cairo	W. S. Van Dyke	Jeanette MacDonald, Robert Young, Lionel Atwill	Comedy thriller	MGM
Call of the Canyon	Joseph Santley	Gene Autry, Ruth Terry	Western	Republic
Call Out the Marines	Frank Ryan	Victor McLaglen, Edmund Lowe, Binnie Barnes	Comedy	20th Century Fox
Calling Dr. Gillespie	Harold S. Bucquet	Lionel Barrymore, Donna Reed	Drama	MGM
Canal Zone	Lew Landers	Chester Morris, Harriet Nelson, Larry Parks	Action	Columbia
Captains of the Clouds	Michael Curtiz	James Cagney, Dennis Morgan, Brenda Marshall	War	Warner Bros.
Careful, Soft Shoulders	Oliver H. P. Garrett	Virginia Bruce, James Ellison, Sheila Ryan	Comedy	20th Century Fox
Casablanca	Michael Curtiz	Humphrey Bogart, Ingrid Bergman, Claude Rains, Paul Henreid, Dooley Wilson, Peter Lorre	Drama, Romance	Warner Bros.; Academy Award Best Picture in 1943
Castle in the Desert	Harry Lachman	Sidney Toler, Arleen Whelan	Mystery	20th Century Fox
Cat People	Jacques Tourneur	Simone Simon, Kent Smith, Jane Randolph	Horror	RKO;
China Girl	Henry Hathaway	Gene Tierney, George Montgomery, Lynn Bari	Drama	20th Century Fox
City of Silent Men	William Nigh	Frank Albertson, June Lang, Jan Wiley	Crime	PRC
A Close Call for Ellery Queen	James P. Hogan	William Gargan, Margaret Lindsay, Kay Linaker	Mystery	Columbia
Code of the Outlaw	John English	Bob Steele, Tom Tyler	Western	Republic
Come on Danger	Edward Killy	Tim Holt, Ray Whitley	Western	RKO
Commandos Strike at Dawn	John Farrow	Paul Muni, Anna Lee, Lillian Gish	War	Columbia
The Corpse Vanishes	Wallace Fox	Bela Lugosi, Luana Walters	Horror	Monogram
Counter-Espionage	Edward Dmytryk	Warren William, Forrest Tucker, Hillary Brooke	Mystery	Columbia
The Courtship of Andy Hardy	George B. Seitz	Lewis Stone, Mickey Rooney, Cecilia Parker, Donna Reed	Comedy	MGM
Cowboy Serenade	William Morgan	Gene Autry, Fay McKenzie	Western	Republic
Criminal Investigator	Jean Yarbrough	Robert Lowery, Edith Fellows, John Miljan	Mystery	Monogram
Crossroads	Jack Conway	William Powell, Hedy Lamarr, Claire Trevor	Mystery	MGM
The Cyclone Kid	George Sherman	Don "Red" Barry, Lynn Merrick	Western	Republic
Danger in the Pacific	Lewis D. Collins	Don Terry, Louise Allbritton	Spy	Universal
Daring Young Man	Frank R. Strayer	Joe E. Brown, Marguerite Chapman, William Wright	Comedy	Columbia
A Date with the Falcon	Irving Reis	George Sanders, Wendy Barrie, Allen Jenkins	Mystery	RKO
The Dawn Express	Albert Herman	Michael Whalen, Anne Nagel, Constance Worth	Thriller	PRC
Dawn on the Great Divide	Howard Bretherton	Buck Jones, Mona Barrie, Raymond Hatton	Western	Monogram
Deep in the Heart of Texas	Elmer Clifton	Johnny Mack Brown, Tex Ritter, Jennifer Holt	Western	Universal
A Desperate Chance for Ellery Queen	James P. Hogan	William Gargan, Margaret Lindsay, John Litel	Mystery	Columbia
Desperate Journey	Raoul Walsh	Errol Flynn, Ronald Reagan, Raymond Massey	War	Warner Bros.
Destination Unknown	Ray Taylor	William Gargan, Irene Hervey, Turhan Bey	Thriller	Universal
The Devil's Trail	Lambert Hillyer	Wild Bill Elliott, Tex Ritter, Noah Beery	Western	Monogram
Don't Get Personal	Charles Lamont	Jane Frazee, Anne Gwynne	Comedy	Universal
Down Rio Grande Way	William Berke	Charles Starrett, Russell Hayden	Western	Columbia
Down Texas Way	Howard Bretherton	Buck Jones, Tim McCoy, Luana Walters	Western	Monogram
Dr. Broadway	Anthony Mann	Macdonald Carey, Jean Phillips	Mystery	Paramount
Dr. Gillespie's New Assistant	Willis Goldbeck	Lionel Barrymore, Van Johnson, Susan Peters	Drama	MGM
Dr. Kildare's Victory	W. S. Van Dyke	Lew Ayres, Ann Ayars, Lionel Barrymore	Drama	MGM
Dr. Renault's Secret	Harry Lachman	J. Carrol Naish, George Zucco, Lynne Roberts	Horror	20th Century Fox
Drums of the Congo	Christy Cabanne	Ona Munson, Stuart Erwin, Peggy Moran	Adventure	Universal
Duke of the Navy	William Beaudine	Ralph Byrd, Stubby Kruger, Veda Ann Borg	Comedy	PRC

== E-F ==
Title	Director	Cast	Genre	Notes
Eagle Squadron	Arthur Lubin	Robert Stack, Diana Barrymore	War	Universal
Enemy Agents Meet Ellery Queen	James P. Hogan	William Gargan, Gale Sondergaard, Margaret Lindsay	Mystery	Columbia
Escape from Crime	D. Ross Lederman	Richard Travis, Jackie Gleason, Julie Bishop	Crime	Warner Bros.
Escape from Hong Kong	William Nigh	Marjorie Lord, Leo Carrillo	Mystery	Universal
Eyes in the Night	Fred Zinnemann	Edward Arnold, Ann Harding, Donna Reed	Mystery	MGM
Eyes of the Underworld	Roy William Neill	Richard Dix, Wendy Barrie, Don Porter	Drama	Universal
The Falcon's Brother	Stanley Logan	George Sanders, Tom Conway, Jane Randolph	Mystery	RKO
The Falcon Takes Over	Irving Reis	George Sanders, Lynn Bari, Allen Jenkins	Mystery	RKO
Fall In	Kurt Neumann	William Tracy, Jean Porter	Comedy	United Artists
Fingers at the Window	Charles Lederer	Lew Ayres, Laraine Day, Basil Rathbone	Mystery	MGM
The Fleet's In	Victor Schertzinger	Dorothy Lamour, William Holden, Betty Hutton	Musical	Paramount
Flight Lieutenant	Sidney Salkow	Pat O'Brien, Glenn Ford, Evelyn Keyes	Drama	Columbia
Fly-by-Night	Robert Siodmak	Richard Carlson, Nancy Kelly, Albert Bassermann	Thriller	Paramount
Flying Tigers	David Miller	John Wayne, John Carroll, Anna Lee	War	Republic
Flying with Music	George Archainbaud	Marjorie Woodworth, George Givot	Musical	United Artists
Footlight Serenade	Gregory Ratoff	Betty Grable, John Payne, Victor Mature	Comedy	20th Century Fox
Foreign Agent	William Beaudine	John Shelton, Gale Storm, Ivan Lebedeff	Crime drama	Monogram
The Forest Rangers	George Marshall	Fred MacMurray, Susan Hayward, Paulette Goddard	Drama	Paramount
For Me and My Gal	Busby Berkeley	Judy Garland, Gene Kelly	Musical	MGM
Four Jacks and a Jill	Jack Hively	Ray Bolger, Desi Arnaz, June Havoc, Anne Shirley	Musical	RKO
Freckles Comes Home	Jean Yarbrough	Gale Storm, Johnny Downs, Mantan Moreland	Comedy	Monogram
Friendly Enemies	Allan Dwan	Charles Winninger, Charles Ruggles, Nancy Kelly	Drama	United Artists
Frisco Lil	Erle C. Kenton	Irene Hervey, Kent Taylor, Jerome Cowan	Drama	Universal

== G-H ==
Title	Director	Cast	Genre	Notes
Gallant Lady	William Beaudine	Rose Hobart, Jane Novak Sidney Blackmer	Drama	PRC
The Gay Sisters	Irving Rapper	Barbara Stanwyck, George Brent, Geraldine Fitzgerald	Drama	Warner Bros.
A Gentleman After Dark	Edwin L. Marin	Miriam Hopkins, Brian Donlevy, Preston Foster	Crime	United Artists
A Gentleman at Heart	Ray McCarey	Cesar Romero, Carole Landis, Milton Berle	Comedy	20th Century Fox
Gentleman Jim	Raoul Walsh	Errol Flynn, Alexis Smith, Alan Hale	Bio-pic	Warner Bros.
George Washington Slept Here	William Keighley	Jack Benny, Ann Sheridan, Charles Coburn	Comedy	Warner Bros.
Get Hep to Love	Charles Lamont	Gloria Jean, Donald O'Connor, Jane Frazee, Peggy Ryan	Musical comedy	Universal
The Ghost of Frankenstein	Erle C. Kenton	Lon Chaney Jr., Cedric Hardwicke, Ralph Bellamy	Horror	Universal
Ghost Town Law	Howard Bretherton	Buck Jones, Tim McCoy, Raymond Hatton	Western	Monogram
The Girl from Alaska	Nick Grinde	Jean Parker, Ray Middleton, Jerome Cowan	Western	Republic
Girl Trouble	Harold D. Schuster	Don Ameche, Joan Bennett	Comedy	20th Century Fox
Girls' Town	Victor Halperin	Edith Fellows, June Storey, Alice White, Anna Q. Nilsson	Drama	PRC
Give Out, Sisters	Edward F. Cline	The Andrews Sisters, Dan Dailey, Donald O'Connor	Musical	Universal
The Glass Key	Stuart Heisler	Alan Ladd, Veronica Lake, Brian Donlevy, William Bendix	Film noir	Paramount; remake of 1935 film
Grand Central Murder	S. Sylvan Simon	Van Heflin, Cecilia Parker, Virginia Grey	Mystery	MGM
The Great Gildersleeve	Gordon Douglas	Harold Peary, Jane Darwell	Comedy	RKO
The Great Man's Lady	William A. Wellman	Barbara Stanwyck, Joel McCrea, Brian Donlevy	Western	Paramount
The Great Impersonation	John Rawlins	Ralph Bellamy, Evelyn Ankers, Kaaren Verne	Drama	Universal
Halfway to Shanghai	John Rawlins	Kent Taylor, Irene Hervey, Henry Stephenson	Adventure	Universal
Hay Foot	Fred Guiol	William Tracy, Joe Sawyer, Elyse Knox	Comedy	United Artists
Heart of the Golden West	Joseph Kane	Roy Rogers, Ruth Terry, Smiley Burnette	Western	Republic
Heart of the Rio Grande	William Morgan	Gene Autry, Fay McKenzie, Edith Fellows	Western	Republic
Hello, Annapolis	Lew Landers	Tom Brown, Jean Parker, Larry Parks	Comedy	Columbia
Henry Aldrich, Editor	Hugh Bennett	Jimmy Lydon, Olive Blakeney, Rita Quigley	Comedy	Paramount
Henry and Dizzy	Hugh Bennett	Jimmy Lydon, Mary Anderson, John Litel	Comedy	Paramount
Her Cardboard Lover	George Cukor	Norma Shearer, Robert Taylor, George Sanders	Comedy	MGM
Here We Go Again	Allan Dwan	Jim Jordan, Marian Jordan, Edgar Bergen	Comedy	RKO
The Hidden Hand	Benjamin Stoloff	Craig Stevens, Elisabeth Fraser, Julie Bishop	Drama	Warner Bros.
Highways by Night	Peter Godfrey	Richard Carlson, Jane Randolph, Barton MacLane	Drama	RKO
Hi, Neighbor	Charles Lamont	Jean Parker John Archer, Janet Beecher	Comedy	Republic
Hillbilly Blitzkrieg	Roy Mack	Bud Duncan, Edgar Kennedy, Cliff Nazarro	Comedy	Monogram
Hitler – Dead or Alive	Nick Grinde	Ward Bond, Dorothy Tree, Warren Hymer	Thriller	Independent
Holiday Inn	Mark Sandrich	Bing Crosby, Fred Astaire, Marjorie Reynolds, Virginia Dale	Musical	Paramount
Home in Wyomin'	William Morgan	Gene Autry, Fay McKenzie	Western	Republic
House of Errors	Bernard B. Ray	Harry Langdon, Marian Marsh, Betty Blythe	Comedy	PRC

== I-J ==
Title	Director	Cast	Genre	Notes
I Live on Danger	Sam White	Chester Morris, Jean Parker	Suspense	Paramount
I Married a Witch	René Clair	Veronica Lake, Fredric March, Susan Hayward	Romantic comedy	United Artists
I Married an Angel	W. S. Van Dyke	Jeanette MacDonald, Nelson Eddy	Musical	MGM
I Was Framed	D. Ross Lederman	Julie Bishop, Tod Andrews	Mystery	Warner Bros.
Ice-Capades Revue	Bernard Vorhaus	Ellen Drew, Richard Denning, Jerry Colonna	Comedy	Republic
Iceland	H. Bruce Humberstone	Sonja Henie, John Payne, Jack Oakie	Musical	20th Century Fox
In Old California	William C. McGann	John Wayne, Binnie Barnes, Albert Dekker	Western	Republic
In This Our Life	John Huston	Bette Davis, Olivia de Havilland, George Brent	Drama	Warner Bros.
Invisible Agent	Edwin L. Marin	Ilona Massey, Jon Hall, Peter Lorre	War	Universal
Inside the Law	Hamilton MacFadden	Wallace Ford, Luana Walters	Crime comedy	PRC
Isle of Missing Men	Richard Oswald	John Howard, Helen Gilbert, Gilbert Roland	Drama	Monogram
It Happened in Flatbush	Ray McCarey	Lloyd Nolan, Carole Landis, Sara Allgood	Sports comedy	20th Century Fox
It's All True	Orson Welles, Norman Foster		Unfinished film	shot in South America
Jackass Mail	Norman Z. McLeod	Wallace Beery, Marjorie Main, J. Carrol Naish	Western	MGM
Jail House Blues	Albert S. Rogell	Nat Pendleton, Anne Gwynne, Robert Paige	Comedy	Universal
Jesse James, Jr.	George Sherman	Don "Red" Barry, Lynn Merrick	Western	Republic
Joan of Ozark	Joseph Santley	Judy Canova, Joe E. Brown, Jerome Cowan	Comedy	Republic
Joan of Paris	Robert Stevenson	Michèle Morgan, Paul Henreid, Laird Cregar	War	RKO
Joe Smith, American	Richard Thorpe	Robert Young, Marsha Hunt	Drama	MGM
Johnny Doughboy	John H. Auer	Jane Withers, Ruth Donnelly, Henry Wilcoxon	Comedy	Republic
Johnny Eager	Mervyn LeRoy	Robert Taylor, Lana Turner	Film noir	MGM
Journey for Margaret	W. S. Van Dyke	Robert Young, Laraine Day, Fay Bainter, Nigel Bruce	Drama	MGM
Juke Box Jenny	Harold Young	Ken Murray, Harriet Hilliard, Iris Adrian	Comedy	Universal
Juke Girl	Curtis Bernhardt	Ann Sheridan, Ronald Reagan, Gene Lockhart	Drama	Warner Bros.
Jungle Book	Zoltan Korda	Sabu, Joseph Calleia	Adventure	United Artists
Jungle Siren	Sam Newfield	Ann Corio, Buster Crabbe, Arno Frey	Adventure	PRC
Junior Army	Lew Landers	Freddie Bartholomew, Billy Halop, Huntz Hall	Drama	Columbia
Just Off Broadway	Herbert I. Leeds	Lloyd Nolan, Marjorie Weaver, Phil Silvers	Mystery	20th Century Fox

== K-L ==
Title	Director	Cast	Genre	Notes
Kid Glove Killer	Fred Zinnemann	Van Heflin, Marsha Hunt	Crime	MGM
King of the Mounties	William Witney	Allan Lane, Peggy Drake	Action	Republic
King of the Stallions	Edward Finney	Dave O'Brien, Rick Vallin, Chief Thundercloud	Western	Monogram
Kings Row	Sam Wood	Ann Sheridan, Ronald Reagan, Robert Cummings	Drama	Warner Bros.; nominated Academy Award for Best Picture
Klondike Fury	William K. Howard	Edmund Lowe, Lucile Fairbanks, Ralph Morgan	Adventure	Monogram
Lady for a Night	Leigh Jason	John Wayne, Joan Blondell, Ray Middleton	Drama	Republic
Lady from Chungking	William Nigh	Anna May Wong, Harold Huber, Mae Clarke	War	PRC
Lady Gangster	Robert Florey	Faye Emerson, Julie Bishop	Crime	Warner Bros.
The Lady Has Plans	Sidney Lanfield	Paulette Goddard, Ray Milland, Roland Young	Comedy	Paramount
Lady in a Jam	Gregory LaCava	Irene Dunne, Ralph Bellamy, Patric Knowles	Comedy	Universal
The Lady Is Willing	Mitchell Leisen	Marlene Dietrich, Fred MacMurray	Comedy	Columbia; Remake of 1934 film
Land of the Open Range	Edward Killy	Tim Holt, Janet Waldo	Western	RKO
Larceny, Inc.	Lloyd Bacon	Edward G. Robinson, Jane Wyman, Broderick Crawford	Crime Comedy	Warner Bros.
Laugh Your Blues Away	Charles Barton	Jinx Falkenburg, Bert Gordon, Isobel Elsom	Comedy	Columbia
Law and Order	Sam Newfield	Buster Crabbe, Al St. John, Wanda McKay	Western	PRC
Law of the Jungle	Jean Yarbrough	Arline Judge, John King,	Drama	Monogram
Lawless Plainsmen	William Berke	Charles Starrett, Russell Hayden, Luana Walters	Western	Columbia
Let's Get Tough!	Wallace Fox	East Side Kids, Florence Rice	Comedy	Monogram
Life Begins at Eight-Thirty	Irving Pichel	Ida Lupino, Monty Woolley, Cornel Wilde	Drama	20th Century Fox
Little Joe, the Wrangler	Lewis D. Collins	Johnny Mack Brown, Tex Ritter, Jennifer Holt	Western	Universal
Little Tokyo, U.S.A.	Otto Brower	Preston Foster, Brenda Joyce, June Duprez	Thriller	20th Century Fox
The Living Ghost	William Beaudine	James Dunn, Joan Woodbury	Suspense	Monogram
The Lone Prairie	William Berke	Russell Hayden, Dub Taylor	Western	Columbia
The Lone Rider in Cheyenne	Sam Newfield	George Houston, Al St. John, Dennis Moore	Western	PRC
Lone Star Ranger	James Tinling	John Kimbrough, Sheila Ryan	Western	20th Century Fox
The Lone Star Vigilantes	Wallace Fox	Wild Bill Elliott, Tex Ritter, Luana Walters	Western	Columbia
Lost Canyon	Lesley Selander	William Boyd, Lola Lane	Western	United Artists
The Loves of Edgar Allan Poe	Harry Lachman	Linda Darnell, Shepperd Strudwick, Virginia Gilmore	Drama	20th Century Fox
Lucky Ghost	William Beaudine	Mantan Moreland, F. E. Miller	Comedy	Independent
Lucky Jordan	Frank Tuttle	Alan Ladd, Helen Walker, Sheldon Leonard	Comedy thriller	Paramount
Lucky Legs	Charles Barton	Jinx Falkenburg, Leslie Brooks, Russell Hayden	Comedy	Columbia
Lure of the Islands	Jean Yarbrough	Margie Hart, Robert Lowery, Gale Storm	Adventure	Monogram

== M-N ==
Title	Director	Cast	Genre	Notes
The Mad Doctor of Market Street	Joseph H. Lewis	Lionel Atwill, Anne Nagel, Claire Dodd, Una Merkel	Horror	Universal
The Mad Martindales	Alfred L. Werker	Jane Withers, Marjorie Weaver, Alan Mowbray	Comedy	20th Century Fox
The Mad Monster	Sam Newfield	George Zucco, Anne Nagel, Glenn Strange	Horror	PRC
Madame Spy	Roy William Neill	Constance Bennett, Don Porter, John Litel	Spy	Universal
The Magnificent Ambersons	Orson Welles	Joseph Cotten, Anne Baxter, Dolores Costello, Agnes Moorehead, Tim Holt	Drama, Romance	RKO
The Magnificent Dope	Walter Lang	Henry Fonda, Lynn Bari, Don Ameche	Comedy	20th Century Fox
The Major and the Minor	Billy Wilder	Ginger Rogers, Ray Milland, Rita Johnson	Comedy	Paramount
The Male Animal	Elliott Nugent	Henry Fonda, Olivia de Havilland, Joan Leslie	Romantic comedy	Warner Bros.
Man from Cheyenne	Joseph Kane	Roy Rogers, Sally Payne	Western	Republic
Man from Headquarters	Jean Yarbrough	Frank Albertson, Joan Woodbury, Byron Foulger	Comedy crime	Monogram
The Man in the Trunk	Malcolm St. Clair	Lynne Roberts, Raymond Walburn, J. Carrol Naish	Comedy	20th Century Fox
The Man Who Came to Dinner	William Keighley	Monty Woolley, Bette Davis, Ann Sheridan, Billie Burke	Comedy	Warner Bros.
The Man Who Returned to Life	Lew Landers	Lucile Fairbanks, John Howard	Drama	Columbia
The Man Who Wouldn't Die	Herbert I. Leeds	Lloyd Nolan, Marjorie Weaver, Henry Wilcoxon	Mystery	20th Century Fox
Man with Two Lives	Phil Rosen	Edward Norris, Marlo Dwyer	Fantasy thriller	Monogram
A Man's World	Charles Barton	William Wright, Marguerite Chapman, Larry Parks, Wynne Gibson	Thriller	Columbia
Manila Calling	Herbert I. Leeds	Lloyd Nolan, Carole Landis, Cornel Wilde	Drama	20th Century Fox
Maisie Gets Her Man	Roy Del Ruth	Ann Sothern, Red Skelton, Allen Jenkins	Comedy	MGM
The Mayor of 44th Street	Alfred E. Green	George Murphy, Anne Shirley, Richard Barthelmess	Comedy	RKO
The McGuerins from Brooklyn	Kurt Neumann	William Bendix, Grace Bradley	Comedy	United Artists
Meet the Stewarts	Alfred E. Green	William Holden, Frances Dee	Comedy	Columbia
Men of San Quentin	William Beaudine	Eleanor Stewart, Dick Curtis	Crime drama	PRC
Men of Texas	Ray Enright	Robert Stack, Jackie Cooper, Broderick Crawford	Western	Universal
Mexican Spitfire at Sea	Leslie Goodwins	Lupe Vélez, Leon Errol, Zasu Pitts	Comedy	RKO
Mexican Spitfire Sees a Ghost	Leslie Goodwins	Lupe Vélez, Buddy Rogers, Elisabeth Risdon	Comedy	RKO
Mexican Spitfire's Elephant	Leslie Goodwins	Lupe Vélez, Walter Reed, Elisabeth Risdon	Comedy	RKO
Miss Annie Rooney	Edwin L. Marin	Shirley Temple, Dickie Moore, Guy Kibbee	Drama	United Artists
Miss V from Moscow	Albert Herman	Lola Lane, Noel Madison, Paul Weigel	Spy drama	PRC
Mississippi Gambler	John Rawlins	Kent Taylor, Frances Langford, John Litel	Crime	Universal
Mokey	Wells Root	Donna Reed, Dan Dailey	Drama	MGM
Moonlight in Havana	Anthony Mann	Allan Jones, Jane Frazee, Marjorie Lord	Drama	Universal
Moonlight Masquerade	John H. Auer	Dennis O'Keefe, Jane Frazee	Comedy	Republic
The Moon and Sixpence	Albert Lewin	George Sanders, Herbert Marshall, Elena Verdugo	Drama	United Artists
Moontide	Archie Mayo	Jean Gabin, Ida Lupino, Claude Rains	Drama	20th Century Fox
Mr. and Mrs. North	Robert B. Sinclair	Gracie Allen, Paul Kelly, Rose Hobart	Mystery	MGM
Mr. Wise Guy	William Nigh	East Side Kids, Billy Gilbert, Joan Barclay	Comedy	Monogram
Mrs. Miniver	William Wyler	Greer Garson, Walter Pidgeon, Teresa Wright	War drama	MGM; won 6 Oscars including Garson, Wright and Best Picture
Mrs. Wiggs of the Cabbage Patch	Norman Taurog	Fay Bainter, Hugh Herbert	Comedy	Paramount
Mug Town	Ray Taylor	Billy Halop, Huntz Hall, Grace McDonald	Comedy	Universal
The Mummy's Tomb	Harold Young	Lon Chaney Jr., Dick Foran, Elyse Knox	Horror	Universal
Murder in the Big House	B. Reeves Eason	Van Johnson, Faye Emerson	Crime	Warner Bros.
My Favorite Blonde	Sidney Lanfield	Bob Hope, Madeleine Carroll, Gale Sondergaard, George Zucco	Comedy	Paramount
My Favorite Spy	Tay Garnett	Kay Kyser, Ellen Drew, Jane Wyman	Comedy	RKO
My Gal Sal	Irving Cummings	Rita Hayworth, Victor Mature, Carole Landis, Phil Silvers	Musical biopic	20th Century Fox
My Heart Belongs to Daddy	Robert Siodmak	Richard Carlson, Martha O'Driscoll, Cecil Kellaway	Comedy	Paramount
My Sister Eileen	Alexander Hall	Rosalind Russell, Brian Aherne Janet Blair	Comedy, Musical	Columbia; Remade as 1955 film
The Mysterious Rider	Sam Newfield	Buster Crabbe, Caroline Burke	Western	PRC
The Mystery of Marie Roget	Phil Rosen	Maria Montez, Patric Knowles, John Litel	Horror	Universal
The Navy Comes Through	A. Edward Sutherland	Pat O'Brien, George Murphy, Jane Wyatt	Drama	RKO
Nazi Agent	Jules Dassin	Conrad Veidt, Ann Ayars, Frank Reicher	Spy thriller	MGM
'Neath Brooklyn Bridge	Wallace Fox	East Side Kids, Ann Gillis	Comedy	Monogram
The Night Before the Divorce	Robert Siodmak	Lynn Bari, Mary Beth Hughes, Nils Asther	Comedy	20th Century Fox
Night in New Orleans	William Clemens	Patricia Morison, Preston Foster, Albert Dekker	Mystery	Paramount
Night Monster	Ford Beebe	Bela Lugosi Lionel Atwill, Irene Hervey	Mystery horror	Universal
Night Plane from Chungking	Ralph Murphy	Robert Preston	War drama	Paramount
A Night to Remember	Richard Wallace	Loretta Young, Brian Aherne	Drama	Columbia
Nightmare	Tim Whelan	Diana Barrymore, Brian Donlevy, Henry Daniell	Crime	Universal Pictures
North of the Rockies	Lambert Hillyer	Wild Bill Elliott, Shirley Patterson, Larry Parks	Western	Columbia
North to the Klondike	Erle C. Kenton	Broderick Crawford, Evelyn Ankers	Western	Universal
Northwest Rangers	Joseph M. Newman	William Lundigan, Patricia Dane	Drama	MGM
Not a Ladies' Man	Lew Landers	Paul Kelly, Fay Wray, Douglas Croft	Drama	Columbia
Now, Voyager	Irving Rapper	Bette Davis, Paul Henreid, Claude Rains, Gladys Cooper	Drama	Warner Bros.; won Oscar for Music Score

== O-P ==
Title	Director	Cast	Genre	Notes
Obliging Young Lady	Richard Wallace	Joan Carroll, Ruth Warrick, Eve Arden	Comedy	RKO
The Old Chisholm Trail	Elmer Clifton	Johnny Mack Brown, Tex Ritter, Jennifer Holt	Western	Universal
The Old Homestead	Frank McDonald	Anne Jeffreys, Maris Wrixon	Comedy	Republic
The Omaha Trail	Edward Buzzell	James Craig, Pamela Blake	Western	MGM
Once Upon a Honeymoon	Leo McCarey	Cary Grant, Ginger Rogers, Walter Slezak	Romantic Comedy	RKO
One Thrilling Night	William Beaudine	Wanda McKay, John Beal	Romantic Comedy	Monogram
On the Sunny Side	Harold D. Schuster	Roddy McDowall, Jane Darwell, Katharine Alexander	Drama	20th Century Fox
Orchestra Wives	Archie Mayo	Ann Rutherford, George Montgomery, Glenn Miller	Musical	20th Century Fox
Outlaws of Boulder Pass	Sam Newfield	George Houston, Al St. John, Dennis Moore	Western	PRC
Outlaws of Pine Ridge	William Witney	Don "Red" Barry, Lynn Merrick, Noah Beery	Western	Republic
Over My Dead Body	Malcolm St. Clair	Milton Berle, Mary Beth Hughes, Reginald Denny	Comedy	20th Century Fox
Overland to Deadwood	William Berke	Charles Starrett, Russell Hayden, Leslie Brooks	Western	Columbia
Overland Stagecoach	Sam Newfield	Robert Livingston, Al St. John, Julie Duncan	Western	PRC
Pacific Rendezvous	George Sidney	Lee Bowman, Jean Rogers, Mona Maris	Drama	MGM
The Palm Beach Story	Preston Sturges	Claudette Colbert, Joel McCrea, Mary Astor, Rudy Vallée	Screwball Comedy	Paramount
Panama Hattie	Norman Z. McLeod	Red Skelton, Ann Sothern, Marsha Hunt	Musical	MGM
The Panther's Claw	William Beaudine	Sidney Blackmer, Rick Vallin, Herbert Rawlinson	Mystery	PRC
Parachute Nurse	Charles Barton	Marguerite Chapman, William Wright, Louise Allbritton	Drama	Columbia
Pardon My Gun	William Berke	Charles Starrett, Alma Carroll	Western	Columbia; Remake of 1930 film
Pardon My Sarong	Erle C. Kenton	Abbott and Costello, Virginia Bruce, Lionel Atwill	Comedy	Universal
Pardon My Stripes	John H. Auer	Sheila Ryan, William Henry, Edgar Kennedy	Comedy	Republic
The Pay Off	Arthur Dreifuss	Lee Tracy, Tom Brown, Evelyn Brent	Crime Drama	PRC
Perils of Nyoka	William Witney	Kay Aldridge	Action, Adventure	Republic
Phantom Killer	William Beaudine	Dick Purcell, Joan Woodbury	Romance, Mystery	Monogram
The Phantom Plainsmen	John English	Bob Steele, Tom Tyler, Lois Collier	Western	Republic
The Pied Piper	Irving Pichel	Monty Woolley, Roddy McDowall, Anne Baxter	War	20th Century Fox
Pierre of the Plains	George B. Seitz	Ruth Hussey, Bruce Cabot, Reginald Owen, Evelyn Ankers	Adventure	MGM
Pirates of the Prairie	Howard Bretherton	Tim Holt, Cliff Edwards, Nell O'Day	Western	RKO
Pittsburgh	Lewis Seiler	John Wayne, Marlene Dietrich, Randolph Scott	Drama	Universal
Police Bullets	Jean Yarbrough	Joan Marsh, John Archer	Crime	Monogram
The Postman Didn't Ring	Harold D. Schuster	Brenda Joyce, Richard Travis, Spencer Charters	Comedy	20th Century Fox
Powder Town	Rowland V. Lee	Edmond O'Brien, Victor McLaglen, June Havoc	Drama	RKO
Prairie Gunsmoke	Lambert Hillyer	Wild Bill Elliott, Tex Ritter, Virginia Carroll	Western	Columbia
Prairie Pals	Sam Newfield	Bill Boyd, Lee Powell	Western	PRC
The Pride of the Yankees	Sam Wood	Gary Cooper, Teresa Wright, Walter Brennan, Babe Ruth	Biopic, Sports	RKO;
Priorities on Parade	Albert S. Rogell	Ann Miller, Johnnie Johnston, Betty Jane Rhodes	Musical	Paramount
Prisoner of Japan	Arthur Ripley	Alan Baxter, Gertrude Michael, Corinna Mura	Thriller	PRC
Private Buckaroo	Edward F. Cline	The Andrews Sisters, Harry James, Joe E. Lewis	Musical	Universal
Private Snuffy Smith	Edward F. Cline	Bud Duncan, Edgar Kennedy	Comedy	Monogram

== Q-R ==
Title	Director	Cast	Genre	Notes
Queen of Broadway	Sam Newfield	Rochelle Hudson, Buster Crabbe, Paul Bryar	Drama	PRC
Quiet Please, Murder	John Larkin	George Sanders, Gail Patrick, Lynne Roberts	Drama	20th Century Fox
Raiders of the Range	John English	Bob Steele, Tom Tyler, Lois Collier	Western	Republic
Raiders of the West	Sam Newfield	Bill Boyd, Lee Powell, Virginia Carroll	Western	PRC
Random Harvest	Mervyn LeRoy	Ronald Colman, Greer Garson	Drama	MGM; 7 Oscar nominations
The Rangers Take Over	Albert Herman	Dave O'Brien, Guy Wilkerson, Iris Meredith	Western	PRC
Reap the Wild Wind	Cecil B. DeMille	John Wayne, Paulette Goddard, Ray Milland	Adventure	Paramount
Red River Robin Hood	Lesley Selander	Tim Holt, Cliff Edwards	Western	RKO
The Remarkable Andrew	Stuart Heisler	William Holden, Brian Donlevy, Ellen Drew	Fantasy	Paramount
Remember Pearl Harbor	Joseph Santley	Don "Red" Barry, Fay McKenzie, Sig Ruman	War	Republic
Reunion in France	Jules Dassin	Joan Crawford, John Wayne, Philip Dorn	War Drama	MGM
Rhythm Parade	Howard Bretherton	Nils Granlund, Gale Storm, Robert Lowery	Musical	Monogram
Ride 'Em Cowboy	Arthur Lubin	Abbott and Costello, Anne Gwynne, Dick Foran	Comedy	Universal
Riders of the Northland	William Berke	Charles Starrett, Russell Hayden, Shirley Patterson	Western	Columbia
Riders of the West	Howard Bretherton	Buck Jones, Tim McCoy, Raymond Hatton	Western	Monogram
Ridin' Down the Canyon	Joseph Kane	Roy Rogers, Linda Hayes	Western	Republic
Riding the Wind	Edward Killy	Tim Holt, Joan Barclay	Western	RKO
Riding Through Nevada	William Berke	Charles Starrett, Shirley Patterson, Arthur Hunnicutt	Western	Columbia
Right to the Heart	Eugene Forde	Brenda Joyce, Stanley Clements, Cobina Wright	Sports comedy	20th Century Fox
Rings on Her Fingers	Rouben Mamoulian	Henry Fonda, Gene Tierney, Laird Cregar	Comedy	20th Century Fox
Rio Rita	S. Sylvan Simon	Abbott and Costello, Kathryn Grayson	Comedy	MGM
Road to Happiness	Phil Rosen	John Boles, Mona Barrie	Drama	
Road to Morocco	David Butler	Bing Crosby, Bob Hope, Dorothy Lamour	Musical comedy	Paramount; third in Road series
Rock River Renegades	S. Roy Luby	Ray Corrigan, Christine McIntyre	Western	Monogram
Rolling Down the Great Divide	Sam Newfield	Bill Boyd, Wanda McKay	Western	PRC
Romance on the Range	Joseph Kane	Roy Rogers, Sally Payne	Western	Republic
Roxie Hart	William A. Wellman	Ginger Rogers, Adolphe Menjou, George Montgomery, Nigel Bruce	Comedy	20th Century Fox
Rubber Racketeers	Harold Young	Rochelle Hudson, Ricardo Cortez, Barbara Read	Crime	Monogram
Rudyard Kipling's Jungle Book	Zoltan Korda	Sabu, Joseph Calleia, John Qualen	Adventure	United Artists

== S ==
Title	Director	Cast	Genre	Notes
Sabotage Squad	Lew Landers	Bruce Bennett, Edward Norris	Action	Columbia
Saboteur	Alfred Hitchcock	Robert Cummings, Priscilla Lane, Norman Lloyd	Film noir	Universal
Scattergood Rides High	Christy Cabanne	Guy Kibbee, Jed Prouty	Comedy	RKO
Scattergood Survives a Murder	Christy Cabanne	Guy Kibbee, Margaret Hayes, John Archer	Comedy	RKO
Sealed Lips	George Waggner	William Gargan, June Clyde	Drama	Universal
Secret Agent of Japan	Irving Pichel	Preston Foster, Lynn Bari	War	20th Century Fox
Secret Enemies	Benjamin Stoloff	Craig Stevens, Faye Emerson	Drama	Warner Bros.
Secrets of a Co-Ed	Joseph H. Lewis	Otto Kruger, Rick Vallin, Marcia Mae Jones	Drama	PRC
Secrets of the Underground	William Morgan	John Hubbard, Virginia Grey, Lloyd Corrigan	Thriller	Republic
Seven Days' Leave	Tim Whelan	Lucille Ball, Victor Mature	Comedy	RKO
Seven Miles from Alcatraz	Edward Dmytryk	James Craig, Bonita Granville	Crime	RKO
Seven Sweethearts	Frank Borzage	Kathryn Grayson, Marsha Hunt, Cecilia Parker	Musical	MGM
Shadows on the Sage	Lester Orlebeck	Bob Steele, Tom Tyler, Cheryl Walker	Western	Republic
She's in the Army	Jean Yarbrough	Lucile Gleason, Veda Ann Borg, Marie Wilson	Comedy	Monogram
Shepherd of the Ozarks	Frank McDonald	Frank Albertson, Thurston Hall	Comedy	Republic
Sheriff of Sage Valley	Sam Newfield	Buster Crabbe, Al St. John	Western	PRC
Sherlock Holmes and the Secret Weapon	Roy William Neill	Basil Rathbone, Nigel Bruce, Lionel Atwill	Mystery	Universal
Sherlock Holmes and the Voice of Terror	John Rawlins	Basil Rathbone, Nigel Bruce, Reginald Denny	Mystery	Univeresal
Ship Ahoy	Edward Buzzell	Eleanor Powell, Red Skelton, Virginia O'Brien	Musical comedy	MGM
Shut My Big Mouth	Charles Barton	Joe E. Brown, Adele Mara, Joan Woodbury	Comedy; Western	Columbia
The Silver Bullet	Joseph H. Lewis	Johnny Mack Brown, William Farnum, Jennifer Holt	Western	Universal
Silver Queen	Lloyd Bacon	George Brent, Priscilla Lane	Western	United Artists
Sin Town	Ray Enright	Constance Bennett, Broderick Crawford, Ward Bond	Western	Universal
Sing Your Worries Away	A. Edward Sutherland	Buddy Ebsen, Patsy Kelly, Bert Lahr	Musical	RKO
Sleepytime Gal	Albert S. Rogell	Judy Canova, Billy Gilbert, Ruth Terry	Comedy	Republic
Small Town Deb	Harold Schuster	Jane Withers, Jane Darwell, Cecil Kellaway	Comedy	20th Century Fox
Smart Alecks	Wallace Fox	Leo Gorcey, Huntz Hall, Gale Storm	Comedy	Monogram
Smith of Minnesota	Lew Landers	Bruce Smith, Arline Judge, Don Beddoe	Sports	Columbia
The Sombrero Kid	George Sherman	Don 'Red' Barry, Lynn Merrick	Western	Republic
Somewhere I'll Find You	Wesley Ruggles	Clark Gable, Lana Turner	Romance	MGM
Son of Fury: The Story of Benjamin Blake	John Cromwell	Tyrone Power, Gene Tierney, George Sanders	Adventure	20th Century Fox
Song of the Islands	Walter Lang	Betty Grable, Victor Mature, Jack Oakie	Musical	20th Century Fox
Sons of the Pioneers	Joseph Kane	Roy Rogers, George "Gabby" Hayes, Maris Wrixon	Western	Republic
So's Your Aunt Emma	Jean Yarbrough	ZaSu Pitts, Roger Pryor, Douglas Fowley	Comedy	Monogram
South of Santa Fe	Joseph Kane	Roy Rogers, Linda Hayes	Western	Republic
The Spirit of Stanford	Charles Barton	Frankie Albert, Marguerite Chapman, Shirley Patterson	Sports	Columbia
The Spoilers	Ray Enright	John Wayne, Marlene Dietrich, Randolph Scott	Western	Universal
Springtime in the Rockies	Irving Cummings	Betty Grable, John Payne, Cesar Romero	Musical	20th Century Fox
Spy Ship	B. Reeves Eason	Craig Stevens, Irene Manning	Spy drama	Warner Bros.
Stagecoach Buckaroo	Ray Taylor	Johnny Mack Brown, Nell O'Day, Anne Nagel	Western	Universal
Stagecoach Express	George Sherman	Don "Red" Barry, Lynn Merrick	Western	Republic
Stand By All Networks	Lew Landers	Florence Rice, John Beal, Margaret Hayes	Thriller	Columbia
Stand By for Action	Robert Z. Leonard	Robert Taylor, Walter Brennan, Charles Laughton	War	MGM
Star Spangled Rhythm	George Marshall	Betty Hutton, Eddie Bracken, Victor Moore	Musical	Paramount
Stardust on the Sage	William Morgan	Gene Autry, Edith Fellows, Smiley Burnette	Western	Republic
The Strange Case of Doctor Rx	William Nigh	Patric Knowles, Lionel Atwill, Anne Gwynne	Drama	Universal
Street of Chance	Jack Hively	Burgess Meredith, Claire Trevor	Crime	Paramount
Strictly in the Groove	Vernon Keays	Mary Healy, Leon Errol, Franklin Pangborn	Musical	Universal
Submarine Raider	Lew Landers	John Howard, Marguerite Chapman	War	Columbia
Sunday Punch	David Miller	William Lundigan, Jean Rogers, Dan Dailey	Comedy	MGM
The Sundown Kid	Elmer Clifton	Don "Red" Barry, Ian Keith	Western	Republic
Sundown Jim	James Tinling	John Kimbrough, Arleen Whelan, Virginia Gilmore	Western	20th Century Fox
Sunset on the Desert	Joseph Kane	Roy Rogers, Lynne Carver, Beryl Wallace	Western	Republic
Sunset Serenade	Joseph Kane	Roy Rogers, Helen Parrish	Western	Republic
Sweater Girl	William Clemens	Eddie Bracken, June Preisser, Nils Asther	Musical	Paramount
Sweetheart of the Fleet	Charles Barton	Joan Davis, Jinx Falkenburg, Joan Woodbury	Comedy	Columbia
Syncopation	William Dieterle	Adolphe Menjou, Jackie Cooper, Bonita Granville	Musical	RKO

== T ==
Title	Director	Cast	Genre	Notes
Take a Letter, Darling	Mitchell Leisen	Rosalind Russell, Fred MacMurray, Constance Moore	Comedy	Paramount
Tales of Manhattan	Julien Duvivier	Charles Boyer, Rita Hayworth, Ginger Rogers, Henry Fonda, Charles Laughton, Edward G. Robinson, Paul Robeson	Drama, comedy; 6 separate stories	20th Century Fox
The Talk of the Town	George Stevens	Cary Grant, Jean Arthur, Ronald Colman	Screwball comedy	Columbia
Tarzan's New York Adventure	Richard Thorpe	Johnny Weissmuller, Maureen O'Sullivan	Adventure	MGM
Ten Gentlemen from West Point	Henry Hathaway	George Montgomery, Maureen O'Hara, John Sutton	Western	20th Century Fox
Tennessee Johnson	William Dieterle	Van Heflin, Lionel Barrymore, Ruth Hussey	Historical	MGM
Texas Justice	Sam Newfield	George Houston, Dennis Moore, Wanda McKay	Western	PRC
Texas Man Hunt	Sam Newfield	Bill Boyd, Lee Powell, Julie Duncan	Western	PRC
Texas to Bataan	Robert Emmett Tansey	John 'Dusty' King, Max Terhune	Western	Monogram
Texas Trouble Shooters	S. Roy Luby	Ray Corrigan, John 'Dusty' King, Max Terhune	Western	Monogram
That Other Woman	Ray McCarey	Virginia Gilmore, Janis Carter, James Ellison	Comedy	RKO
There's One Born Every Minute	Harold Young	Hugh Herbert, Peggy Moran, Guy Kibbee	Comedy	Universal
They All Kissed the Bride	Alexander Hall	Joan Crawford, Melvyn Douglas	Comedy	Columbia
They Raid by Night	Spencer Gordon Bennet	Lyle Talbot, June Duprez, Victor Varconi	War	PRC
This Above All	Anatole Litvak	Tyrone Power, Joan Fontaine	Romance	20th Century Fox
This Gun for Hire	Frank Tuttle	Alan Ladd, Veronica Lake, Laird Cregar	Thriller	Paramount
This Time for Keeps	Charles Reisner	Ann Rutherford, Robert Sterling, Irene Rich	Comedy	MGM
Thru Different Eyes	Thomas Z. Loring	Frank Craven, June Walker, Vivian Blaine	Drama	20th Century Fox
Thunder Birds	William A. Wellman	Gene Tierney, Preston Foster, John Sutton	War	20th Century Fox
Thunder River Feud	S. Roy Luby	Ray Corrigan, John 'Dusty' King, Max Terhune	Western	Monogram
Thundering Hoofs	Lesley Selander	Tim Holt, Luana Walters	Western	RKO
Timber	Christy Cabanne	Marjorie Lord, Dan Dailey	Drama	Universal
Time to Kill	Herbert I. Leeds	Lloyd Nolan, Heather Angel, Ralph Byrd	Crime drama	20th Century Fox
Tish	S. Sylvan Simon	ZaSu Pitts, Marjorie Main, Aline MacMahon	Comedy	MGM
To Be or Not to Be	Ernst Lubitsch	Carole Lombard, Jack Benny, Robert Stack	Screwball comedy	United Artists
Today I Hang	Oliver Drake	Walter Woolf King, Mona Barrie, William Farnum	Drama	Producers Releasing Corporation
To the Shores of Tripoli	H. Bruce Humberstone	Maureen O'Hara, John Payne, Randolph Scott	Romantic drama	20th Century Fox
Tombstone	William McGann	Richard Dix, Frances Gifford, Kent Taylor	Western	Paramount
Tomorrow We Live	Edgar G. Ulmer	Ricardo Cortez, Jean Parker, Emmett Lynn	Action	PRC
Too Many Women	Bernard B. Ray	Neil Hamilton, June Lang, Joyce Compton	Comedy	PRC
Top Sergeant	Christy Cabanne	Leo Carrillo, Don Terry, Elyse Knox	War	Universal
A Tornado in the Saddle	William Berke	Russell Hayden, Dub Taylor, Alma Carroll	Western	Columbia
Torpedo Boat	John Rawlins	Richard Arlen, Jean Parker, Mary Carlisle	War	Paramount
Tortilla Flat	Victor Fleming	Spencer Tracy, Hedy Lamarr, John Garfield	Comedy, drama	MGM; based on John Steinbeck book
Tough as They Come	William Nigh	Billy Halop, Helen Parrish, Ann Gillis	Crime	Universal
A Tragedy at Midnight	Joseph Santley	John Howard, Margaret Lindsay, Mona Barrie	Comedy	Republic
Trail Riders	Robert Emmett Tansey	John Dusty King, Evelyn Finley, Max Terhune	Western	Monogram
The Traitor Within	Frank McDonald	Don "Red" Barry, Jean Parker, Ralph Morgan	Action	Republic
Tramp, Tramp, Tramp	Charles Barton	Jackie Gleason, Florence Rice, Bruce Bennett, Mabel Todd	Comedy	Columbia
Treat 'Em Rough	Ray Taylor	Eddie Albert, Peggy Moran	Drama	Universal
True to the Army	Albert S. Rogell	Judy Canova, Ann Miller, Allan Jones	Comedy	Paramount
Tumbleweed Trail	Sam Newfield	Bill Boyd, Lee Powell	Western	PRC
The Tuttles of Tahiti	Charles Vidor	Charles Laughton, Jon Hall, Peggy Drake	Adventure	RKO
Twin Beds	Tim Whelan	Joan Bennett, George Brent, Mischa Auer	Comedy	United Artists
Two Yanks in Trinidad	Gregory Ratoff	Pat O'Brien, Brian Donlevy, Janet Blair	Spy comedy	Columbia

== U-V ==
Title	Director	Cast	Genre	Notes
Undercover Man	Lesley Selander	William Boyd, Antonio Moreno, Nora Lane	Western	United Artists
Underground Agent	Michael Gordon	Bruce Bennett, Leslie Brooks, Frank Albertson	Thriller	Columbia
The Undying Monster	John Brahm	James Ellison, Heather Angel, Bramwell Fletcher	Horror	20th Century Fox
Unseen Enemy	John Rawlins	Don Terry, Irene Hervey	War	Universal
Valley of Hunted Men	John English	Bob Steele, Tom Tyler	Western	Republic
Valley of the Sun	George Marshall	Lucille Ball, James Craig, Cedric Hardwicke	Western	RKO
The Vanishing Virginian	Frank Borzage	Kathryn Grayson, Frank Morgan	Musical	MGM
Vengeance of the West	Lambert Hillyer	Wild Bill Elliott, Tex Ritter, Adele Mara	Western	Universal

== W-Z ==
Title	Director	hahaha	Genre	Notes
Wake Island	John Farrow	Brian Donlevy, Robert Preston	War drama	Paramount
The War Against Mrs. Hadley	Harold Bucquet	Fay Bainter, Edward Arnold, Jean Rogers	Drama	MGM
War Dogs	S. Roy Luby	Billy Lee, Addison Richards, Kay Linaker	Drama	Monogram
We Were Dancing	Robert Z. Leonard	Norma Shearer, Melvyn Douglas, Gail Patrick	Comedy	MGM
Western Mail	Robert Emmett Tansey	Tom Keene, LeRoy Mason	Western	Monogram
West of the Law	Howard Bretherton	Buck Jones, Tim McCoy, Raymond Hatton	Western	Monogram
West of Tombstone	Howard Bretherton	Charles Starrett, Marcella Martin	Western	Columbia
Westward Ho	John English	Bob Steele, Tom Tyler, Evelyn Brent	Western	Republic
What's Cookin'?	Edward F. Cline	The Andrews Sisters, Jane Frazee, Gloria Jean	Musical	Universal
When Johnny Comes Marching Home	Charles Lamont	Allan Jones, Jane Frazee, Gloria Jean	Musical	Universal
Where Trails End	Robert Emmett Tansey	Tom Keene, Wilhelm von Brincken	Western	Monogram
Whispering Ghosts	Alfred L. Werker	Milton Berle, Brenda Joyce	Comedy horror	20th Century Fox
Whistling in Dixie	S. Sylvan Simon	Red Skelton, Ann Rutherford, Diana Lewis	Comedy crime	MGM
White Cargo	Richard Thorpe	Hedy Lamarr, Walter Pidgeon, Richard Carlson	Drama	MGM
Who Done It?	Erle C. Kenton	Abbott and Costello, Patric Knowles, Louise Allbritton	Comedy	Universal
Who Is Hope Schuyler?	Thomas Z. Loring	Sheila Ryan, Joan Valerie, Ricardo Cortez	Mystery	20th Century Fox
The Wife Takes a Flyer	Richard Wallace	Joan Bennett, Franchot Tone, Allyn Joslyn	Romantic comedy	Columbia
Wild Bill Hickok Rides	Ray Enright	Constance Bennett, Bruce Cabot, Warren William	Western	Warner Bros.
Wildcat	Frank McDonald	Richard Arlen, Arline Judge, William Frawley	Drama	Paramount
Wings for the Eagle	Lloyd Bacon	Ann Sheridan, Dennis Morgan, Jack Carson	Drama	Warner Bros.
Woman of the Year	George Stevens	Spencer Tracy, Katharine Hepburn, Reginald Owen	Romantic comedy	MGM
Wrecking Crew	Frank McDonald	Jean Parker, Richard Arlen, Evelyn Brent	Drama	Paramount
X Marks the Spot	George Sherman	Dick Purcell, Anne Jeffreys	Drama	Republic
Yankee Doodle Dandy	Michael Curtiz	James Cagney, Joan Leslie, Walter Huston	Biography	Warner Bros.; 9 Academy Award nominations, Oscar for Cagney
A Yank at Eton	Norman Taurog	Mickey Rooney, Edmund Gwenn, Ian Hunter	Drama	MGM
A Yank in Libya	Albert Herman	Joan Woodbury, H. B. Warner, Duncan Renaldo	Spy	PRC
A Yank on the Burma Road	George B. Seitz	Laraine Day, Barry Nelson, Keye Luke	Adventure	MGM
The Yanks Are Coming	Alexis Thurn-Taxis	Mary Healy, Henry King	Musical	PRC
Yokel Boy	Joseph Santley	Joan Davis, Albert Dekker, Alan Mowbray	Comedy	Republic
You Can't Escape Forever	Jo Graham	George Brent, Brenda Marshall, Gene Lockhart	Drama	Warner Bros.
You Were Never Lovelier	William A. Seiter	Fred Astaire, Rita Hayworth, Adolphe Menjou	Musical comedy	Columbia
Young America	Louis King	Jane Withers, Jane Darwell, Lynne Roberts	Drama	20th Century Fox
You're Telling Me	Charles Lamont	Hugh Herbert, Anne Gwynne, Robert Paige	Comedy	Universal
Youth on Parade	Albert S. Rogell	John Hubbard, Ruth Terry, Martha O'Driscoll	Musical comedy	Republic

== Documentaries ==
Title	Director	Cast	Genre	Notes
The Battle of Midway	John Ford		Propaganda	Academy Award
December 7th: The Movie	John Ford, Gregg Toland	Walter Huston, Dana Andrews	Propaganda film	Academy Award for Documentary Short Subject
The News Parade of the Year 1942	Eugene W. Castle		Short documentary	
Prelude to War	Frank Capra		Documentary	The first of Capra's Why We Fight film series
Sex Hygiene	Otto Brower, John Ford	George Reeves, Richard Derr	Docudrama	
We Are the Marines	Louis de Rochemont		War documentary	20th Century Fox

== Serials ==
Title	Director	Cast	Genre	Notes
Don Winslow of the Navy	Ray Taylor	Don Terry	Serial	Universal
Gang Busters	Noel M. Smith, Ray Taylor	Kent Taylor, Irene Hervey	Serial	Universal
Junior G-Men of the Air		Dead End Kids, Little Tough Guys	Serial	Universal
Overland Mail	Ford Beebe	Noah Beery Jr., Don Terry	Serial	Universal
Spy Smasher	William Witney	Kane Richmond, Marguerite Chapman	Spy serial	Republic

== Shorts ==
Title	Director	Cast	Genre	Notes
Any Bonds Today?	Bob Clampett		Animated Propaganda	Warner Bros.
The Arm Behind the Army			Propaganda Short	10 minutes
The Bowling Alley Cat	Hanna Barbera		Animated Short	Warner Bros.
Bugs Bunny Gets the Boid	Robert Clampett		Animated short	Warner Bros.
Campus on the March			Propaganda	
Dog Trouble	Hanna Barbera		Animated Short	MGM
Donald Gets Drafted	Jack King	Donald Duck	Animated Short	RKO, Disney
The Dover Boys	Charles M. Jones		Animated Short	Warner Bros.
The Draft Horse			Animated Short	Warner Bros.
Fine Feathered Friend	Hanna Barbera	Tom and Jerry	Animated Short	MGM
Fraidy Cat	Hanna Barbera	Tom and Jerry	Animated Short	MGM
Fresh Hare	I. Freleng		Animated Short	Warner Bros.
Hemp for Victory	Raymond Evans		Propaganda	
Henry Browne, Farmer	Canada Lee		Propaganda Short	
Hold the Lion, Please	Chuck Jones		Animated Short	Warner Bros.
How to Play Baseball	Jack Kinney		Animated Short	RKO
How to Swim	Jack Kinney		Animated Short	RKO, Disney
It's Everybody's War			Propaganda short	
Jam Session		Duke Ellington and orchestra	Short	performing C Jam Blues
Japanese Relocation			Short war propaganda	produced by Office of War Information
Manpower			Propaganda short	produced by Office of War Information
Mickey's Birthday Party	Riley Thomson	Mickey Mouse	Short animation	Disney, RKO
My Favorite Duck		Porky Pig and Daffy Duck	Animated comedy	
Puss 'n' Toots	William Hanna, Joseph Barbera		Short animation	MGM
Safeguarding Military Information	John Huston		Propaganda short	
The Squawkin' Hawk	Chuck Jones		Animated short	Warner Bros.
A Tale of Two Kitties	Bob Clampett		Animation	
Tulips Shall Grow			Animated short	nominated for Academy Award
The Wabbit Who Came to Supper	I. Freleng		Animated	Warner Bros.
Winning Your Wings	John Huston		Propaganda short	
Wood for War	Arthur H. Wolf		Propaganda short	
The World at War	Frank Capra		Propaganda short	Produced by Office of War Information
You're a Sap, Mr. Jap	Dan Gordon	Popeye cartoon	Propaganda short Animated short	Famous Studios; Paramount Pictures

== See also ==
- 1942 in the United States
