= Bombs Bursting in Air =

Bombs Bursting in Air and similar phrases could refer to:

- "...Bombs Bursting in Air... ", a phrase from the national anthem of the United States, "The Star-Spangled Banner"
- "Bombs Bursting in Air", a 1990 episode of the American television series The New Dragnet
- Bombs Bursting in Air: The Influence of Air Power on International Relations, a 1939 book by George Fielding Eliot
