= Pardon My Gun =

Pardon My Gun may refer to:

- Pardon My Gun (1930 film), an American film directed by Robert De Lacey
- Pardon My Gun (1942 film), an American film directed by William Berke, see List of American films of 1942
