= Wyoming Hurricane =

1944 film by William Berke

- Theatrical release poster
- Directed by: William Berke
- Screenplay by: Fred Myton
- Produced by: Leon Barsha
- Starring: Russell Hayden; Dub Taylor; Bob Wills; Tommy Duncan; Leon McAuliffe; Alma Carroll
- Cinematography: Benjamin H. Kline
- Edited by: Charles Nelson
- Production company: Columbia Pictures
- Distributed by: Columbia Pictures
- Release date: April 20, 1944
- Running time: 58 minutes
- Country: United States
- Language: English

Wyoming Hurricane is a 1944 American Western film directed by William Berke and written by Fred Myton. The film stars Russell Hayden, Dub Taylor, Bob Wills, Tommy Duncan, Leon McAuliffe and Alma Carroll. The film was released on April 20, 1944, by Columbia Pictures.

== Cast ==
- Russell Hayden as Lucky Saunders
- Dub Taylor as Cannonball
- Bob Wills as Bob
- Tommy Duncan as Musician
- Leon McAuliffe as Steel Guitar Player
- Al Stricklin as Musician
- Alma Carroll as Gayle Foster
- Tris Coffin as Steve Kirby
- Joel Friedkin as Dan Foster
- Paul Sutton as Bart Cassidy
- Benny Petti as Joe Slade
- Robert Kortman as Vic Dawson
- Hal Price as Sheriff
- Steve Clark as Jed
- Frank McCarroll as Henchman
- Carol Henry as Henchman
