= Hollywood Victory Caravan =

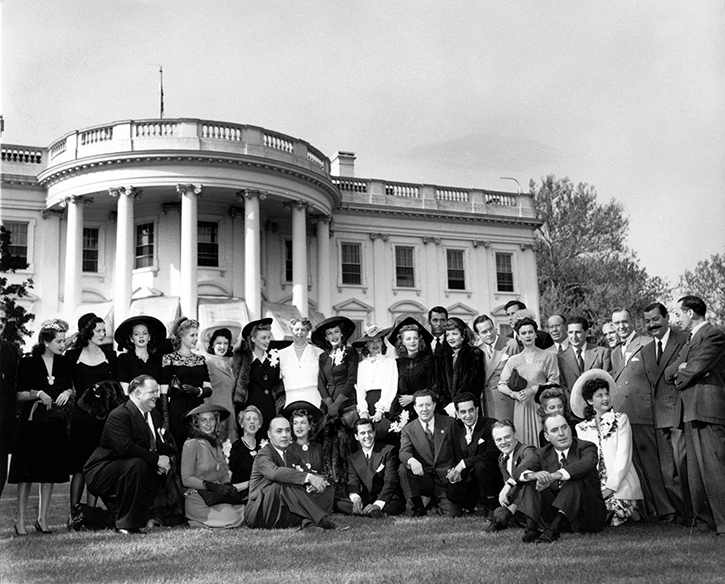
Eleanor Roosevelt on the White House lawn with stars and organizers of the Hollywood Victory Caravan (April 30, 1942)

The Hollywood Victory Caravan was a two-week cross-country railroad journey in 1942 that brought together two dozen film stars to raise money for the Army and Navy Relief Society. It was sponsored by the Hollywood Victory Committee of Stage, Screen and Radio. The Caravan show played in 12 cities and netted over $700,000 for Army and Navy relief funds.

At the end of World War II, a short film was commissioned from Paramount Pictures by the United States Department of the Treasury, to promote the purchase of Victory Bonds. Some 19 minutes in length, Hollywood Victory Caravan was released in October 1945 and featured Bing Crosby and Bob Hope, as well as celebrities who were not on the original road trip.

== Background ==
The Hollywood Victory Caravan show was partially inspired by an all-star war bond show at Madison Square Garden on March 10, 1942, organized by Walter Winchell for the benefit of Navy Relief. Plans were then made for a nationwide tour by Hollywood stars. The Santa Fe Railroad donated the use of a special train and this had up to 14 railroad cars which had facilities for rehearsals on board with two portable dance floors, two pianos and ten musicians. Setting off from Los Angeles on April 26, 1942, it traveled to Washington, D.C., where the stars went to a White House Tea Party at the invitation of First Lady Eleanor Roosevelt on April 30 before opening their musical revue extravaganza that night at 8:30 p.m. at Loew’s Capitol. The total “on stage” troupe for opening night consisted of 75 people.

== Tour ==
- April 30, 1942: Loew’s Capitol, Washington DC - attendance 3400, takings just under $25,000.
- May 1, 1942: Boston Garden, Boston, Massachusetts - attendance 20,000, takings $77,750
- May 2, 1942: Convention Hall, Philadelphia - attendance 16,000, takings $31,500
- May 3, 1942: Cleveland Public Auditorium, Ohio - attendance 10,721, takings $31,667
- May 4, 1942: Coliseum at State Fair Grounds, Detroit, Michigan - attendance 5,600, takings $53,000
- May 6, 1942: Chicago Stadium, Illinois - attendance 19,823, takings $87,761
- May 7, 1942: St. Louis Municipal Auditorium, Missouri - attendance 12,369, takings $41,000
- May 9, 1942: St. Paul Municipal Auditorium, Minnesota (matinee show at 2:30 p.m.) - attendance 10,000, takings $28,329
- May 9, 1942: Minneapolis Auditorium, Minnesota (8:30 p.m.) - attendance 9,503, takings $33,750
- May 10, 1942: Shrine Auditorium, Des Moines, Iowa (2:30 p.m.) - attendance 4,300, takings $22,474
- May 11, 1942: Fair Park Auditorium, Dallas, Texas - attendance 9,503, takings $37,222
- May 12, 1942: Sam Houston Coliseum, Houston, Texas - attendance 11,000, takings $65,000

Many of the stars had to leave the train in Los Angeles to return to their other commitments but a few of the Caravan members plus some additions did a final show in San Francisco on May 19, 1942, under the Hollywood Victory Caravan banner.

== Stars ==
Mark Sandrich was the show’s producer and Alfred Newman was the musical director. Special music and lyrics were written for the show by Jerome Kern, Johnny Mercer, Frank Loesser and Arthur Schwartz. Not every star was available for every performance; Bing Crosby, for example, was not able to join the tour until Chicago.

- Desi Arnaz
- Joan Bennett
- Joan Blondell
- Charles Boyer
- James Cagney
- Claudette Colbert
- Jerry Colonna
- Bing Crosby
- Olivia de Havilland
- Cary Grant
- Charlotte Greenwood
- Bob Hope
- Frances Langford
- Laurel and Hardy
- Bert Lahr
- Groucho Marx
- Frank McHugh
- Ray Middleton
- Merle Oberon
- Pat O'Brien
- Eleanor Powell
- Risë Stevens

Seven starlets included Karin Booth, Alma Carroll, Frances Gifford, Elyse Knox, Marie McDonald, Fay McKenzie, Juanita Stark and Arleen Whelan.

== Show ==
The content of the show varied but typically it ran for around three and half hours with Bob Hope and Cary Grant sharing the master-of-ceremonies role. Each star had a brief role and for instance Laurel and Hardy did their “Driver’s Licence Sketch”, James Cagney did songs and dances as George M. Cohan in full costume from Yankee Doodle Dandy and Bing Crosby sang four songs and engaged in banter with Bob Hope. A fuller description of the Minneapolis show can be found in Robert E. Murphy’s report in the Sunday Tribune and Star Journal of May 10, 1942. A review of the Dallas show can be found in Muriel Windham's Diary which her daughter has published as a blog.

Bing Crosby commented on the tour saying: "In addition to accomplishing its purpose, I think that every one connected with it had a barrel of fun, despite the adversities under which we lived and worked. There wasn’t a single squawk about anything or any unpleasantness of any kind. If you could have seen our Hollywood Glamour Girls like Claudette Colbert, Merle Oberon, Joan Bennett and Joan Blondell all jammed together, dressing in the ladies’ rooms of auditoriums, doing it cheerfully and laughing and kidding with each other all the time, you’d know what I mean. If any one of them—or any of the male stars either—had been asked to put up with the inconveniences on a picture, for which they were being highly paid, that they endured with a laugh and for nothing on that trip, they’d have walked out of the picture."

== Hollywood Victory Caravan (film) ==
Hollywood Victory Caravan
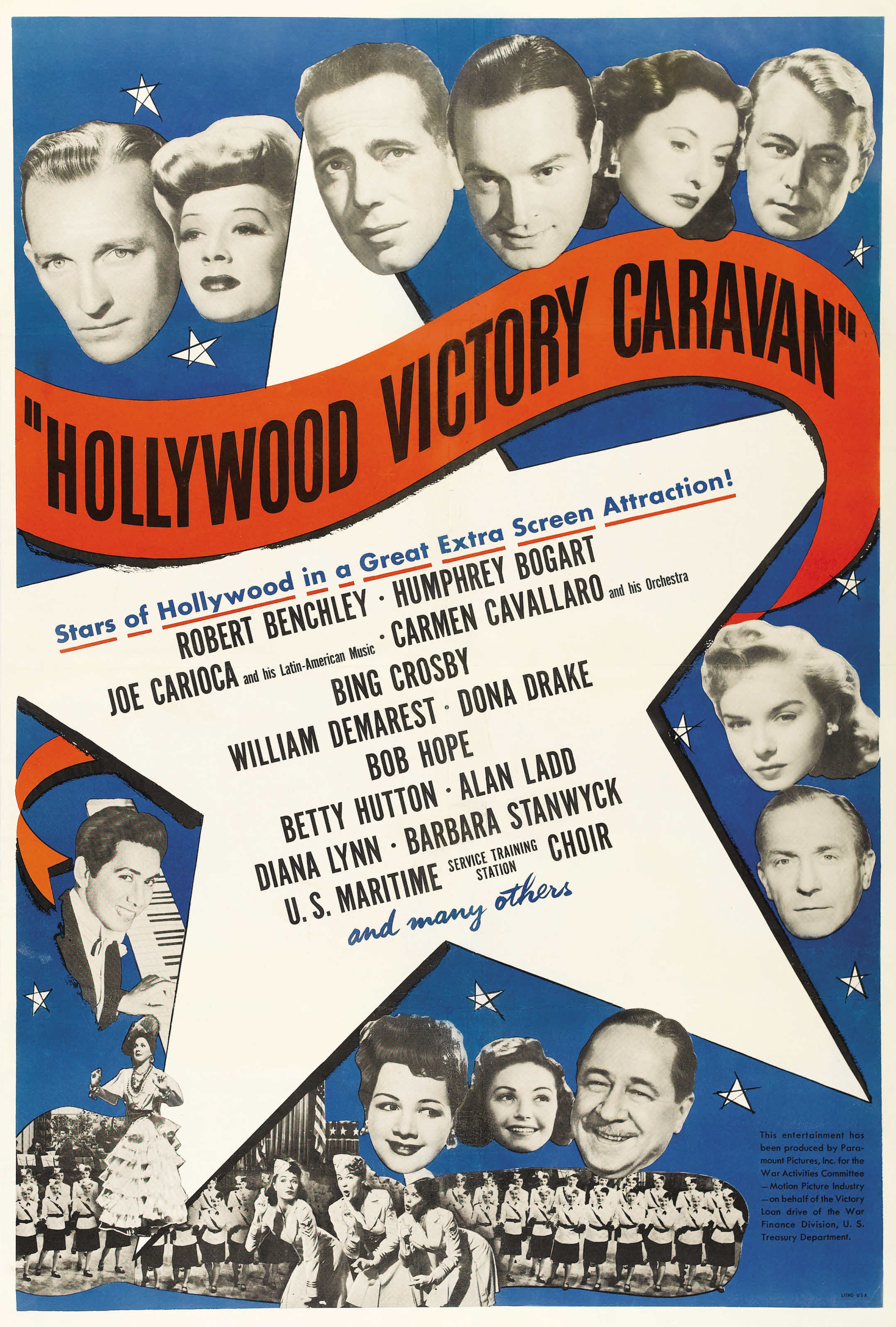
- Theatrical release poster for the 1945 short film
- Directed by: William D. Russell (uncredited)
- Screenplay by: Melville Shavelson (uncredited)
- Starring: Bing Crosby (uncredited); Bob Hope (uncredited); Humphrey Bogart (uncredited); Alan Ladd (uncredited)
- Production companies: Paramount Pictures; United States Department of the Treasury
- Distributed by: Paramount Pictures
- Release date: October 1945
- Running time: 19 minutes
- Country: United States

A comedic 19-minute short film starring Bing Crosby and Bob Hope, plus other celebrities who were not on the actual road trip, was released in October 1945 by Paramount Pictures and the United States Department of the Treasury to promote the purchase of Victory Bonds.

=== Cast ===
The cast of Hollywood Victory Caravan is recorded by the British Film Institute.

- Robert Benchley
- Humphrey Bogart
- Carmen Cavallaro and His Orchestra
- Bing Crosby
- William Demarest
- Dona Drake
- Bob Hope
- Betty Hutton
- Alan Ladd
- Diana Lynn
- Noreen Nash
- Franklin Pangborn
- Olga San Juan
- Barbara Stanwyck
- Charles Victor
- Marjorie Weaver

=== Reception ===
"The film has a definite story," wrote The Film Daily, "recounting the inability of a young girl to get a train reservation from Hollywood to Washington to meet an invalid G.I. brother. Pity for her plight is appreciated by a bevy of screen stars, members of the 'Hollywood Victory Caravan,' bound for the nation’s capital, and, to make room for her on the train, Bob Hope agrees much against his will, to share a bunk with Bing Crosby. These sequences are potent laugh-makers ... Crosby and the U.S. Maritime Service Training Station Choir introduce the Victory Loan song, 'We’ve Got Another Bond to Buy'—and it’s rousing stuff."

== See also ==
- List of Allied Propaganda Films of World War 2
