= Bill Lignante =

American artist (1925–2018)

Bill Lignante's courtroom sketch art of Sirhan Sirhan and the followers of Charles Manson.

William Gaetano Lignante (March 20, 1925 – February 27, 2018) was an American artist notable for his varied career as a comic book illustrator, comic strip artist, animator and courtroom sketch artist.

== Early life and career ==
Born in Brooklyn, New York in March 1925, Lignante was in the Navy and studied art at Pratt Institute. He first drew The Phantom when he completed a strip left unfinished after the death of Wilson McCoy in 1961. He then drew the Sunday strip from August, 1961 to May 1962. He did The Phantom comic book (interior art) for Gold Key Comics, from issue 1–18; continuing the book for King Comics, through issue 28 and he also contributed to Charlton Comics, when they published Phantom issues 30-74 (although Jim Aparo did most art, as Lignante was in courtrooms by then). He had a 16-year career as an animator (layout artist) for Hanna-Barbera.

== Courtroom sketch artist ==
Of his many illustration assignments, Lignante wrote, "None of these compare to the instant art of the courtroom. No roughs, research, conferences, assistants, editors and no time. What you see, you draw, so that the world can see it too." In the 26 years he spent as a courtroom artist for ABC Network News, he illustrated 60 trials, including those of Sirhan Sirhan, Charles Manson and Patty Hearst.

== Personal life ==
Living in Carlsbad, California with his wife, former actress Alma Carroll, Lignante often traveled during three decades to deliver his "Trials of a Courtroom Artist" lecture. His daughter Russelle, her husband Robert and their children are Long Island residents.

Lignante died on February 27, 2018, at the age of 92.
