= Hollywood Victory Committee =

The Hollywood Victory Committee was an organization founded on December 10, 1941, during World War II to provide a means for stage, screen, television and radio performers that were not in military service to contribute to the war effort through bond drives and improving morale for troops. It was associated with the Screen Actors Guild. The Committee organized events between January 1942 until August 1945. Chairmen of the committee included Clark Gable, James Cagney, Sam Levene and George Murphy. Hattie McDaniel was the Chairman of the Negro Division of the Hollywood Victory Committee, providing entertainment for soldiers in hospitals, and those stationed at military bases.

One of the committee's most notable successes was the Hollywood Victory Caravan which crossed the country in April / May 1942.

Within its four years, arranged for stars to travel five million miles to entertain soldiers. The committee's final report took credit for providing 56,037 free appearances by 4,147 persons in 7,700 events, including 13,555 playing days by 176 persons on 122 overseas tours.

The Hollywood Victory Committee organized Hollywood stars to headline many of the variety, dramatic, and musical shows provided by the USO Camp Tours. The shows were originally organized under great secrecy and sent initially to the British Isles to entertain American troops stationed there. Entertainers would eventually travel to most battle fields to provide entertainment to active duty soldiers.

Radio broadcasts were a very important part of this entertainment since radio could reach millions of people quickly and many stars were recruited to help get out important messages on buying bonds, saving salvage scrap, or raising funds for charity. Using the top names in entertainment to make the announcements elevated participation and public reception of the projects. There were many requests for programs, sometimes as many as five in one week, and all were met. Hollywood stars were even furnished to Canada to promote the sale of Canadian Victory Bonds.

One very popular program organized by the Hollywood Victory Committee was the broadcast of Command Performance. This program was not heard by American civilians but broadcast by short-wave radio to America's fighting forces on all battle fronts. The American soldiers sent in requests for what wanted on these broadcasts and the Hollywood Victory Committee worked to furnish the Hollywood stars. Major General A.D. Surles, Director of the War Department Bureau of Public Relations, said that the troops "sit with ears glued to the radio every Sunday." Surles also wrote, "it may be seen that your efforts on our behalf and the many services rendered to us by you and the stars of the screen, stage and radio are not only doing a tremendous job in the entertainment of our men in service abroad, but are doing an equally important job in building goodwill for our country with international audience."

== Beginning of the Hollywood Victory Committee ==
Clark Gable was the first chairman of the Hollywood Victory Committee. He had starred in the movie Gone With the Wind in 1939 and had recently completed other films such as Boom Town with Spencer Tracy in 1940. A major star when the attack on Pearl Harbor occurred in 1941. Gable was perfect to lead the patriotic movement in Hollywood.

One of Gable's first decisions as chairman of the Hollywood Victory Committee was to enlist the aid of his wife, Carole Lombard, also a successful actress, to sell war bonds. She initially traveled around Indiana, selling over $2 million in war bonds. In Indianapolis, Lombard lead the crowd in the World War II cheer "V for Victory". Tragically, this patriotic act may have contributed to her untimely death. In a hurry to return home to her husband in California, Lombard purchased seats on TWA Flight #3 from Indianapolis to Burbank. The flight made a stop for a scheduled layover in Las Vegas, and Lombard and her group were in danger of being bumped. She talked her way onto the final leg of the flight by reminding military officials that she had sold over $2 million in war bonds. In flight for only a few minutes and a short 32 miles from the airport, the DC-3 crashed into Potosi Mountain. All aboard the flight were killed.

Army officials offered to honor Lombard with a complete military funeral but Gable chose to respect her wishes and opted for a simple, private funeral. After his wife's burial in California, Clark Gable joined the Army Air Corps and flew B-17 missions from England. Lombard was recognized by the Hollywood Victory Committee as the first star to give her life in the war effort.

Prior to World War II America adopted an isolationist policy and sought to avoid involvement in the growing conflicts in Europe. During World War I, war had become more violent and all-encompassing for those nations involved. Casualties from the new styles of war skyrocketed. Americans were disillusioned with war and they needed to be quickly convinced to join the conflict. With the bombing of Pearl Harbor on December 7, 1941, and America's entrance into the war, something had to be done to convert America's isolationist citizens.

On December 18, 1941, President Roosevelt addressed Hollywood and asked them to help change Americans into supporters of the war effort. Hollywood stars were called upon to promote the sale of war bonds, raise compliance with rationing programs, explain the Land-Lease Program and encourage everyone to pay their taxes and support the war.

Gable, the first chairman of the Hollywood Victory Committee, encouraged his fellow actors to not only support the war effort with their talents but to actively join the military. Gable, Ronald Reagan and Jimmy Stewart led by example and enlisted. Stewart joined the Army Air Force Corps as a private and was eventually promoted to lieutenant colonel. Stewart would become a brigadier general . Hollywood stars also raised money and support for the war by participating, entertaining and selling war bonds. Actor Audie Murphy would become the most decorated war veteran of the war. Hollywood was clearly leading the way in supporting World War II through the leadership of the Hollywood Victory Committee.

The Hollywood Victory Committee encouraged movie theaters to also participate in the war mobilization. Theaters often became collection centers for items that needed to be recycled. Stars often lead such drives as the recycling of metals and actress Rita Hayworth even donated her car's bumpers to the scrap metal drive. Many theaters also sold war bonds from the box office. They were centers for blood donation as well and many Hollywood actors and actresses lead the way and publicly made blood donations at the theaters. Some theaters granted free admission with a blood donation. The Hollywood Victory Committed lead the way in converting Americans to become war supporters.

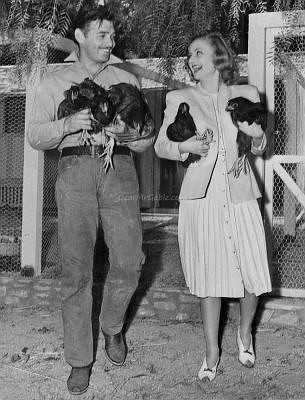
Clark Gable and Carole Lombard

== James Cagney ==
James Cagney, one of the great actors of Hollywood's Golden Age, was one of the early chairmen of the Hollywood Victory Committee. Famous for his defiant comedy and vivacious presence on screen he could play a gangster as well as dance in a musical. His favorite film, Yankee Doodle Dandy. 1942 was a patriotic wartime musical that was filled with passion and support for the military. He was a close friend of Ronald Reagan, he was a family man who passionately supported his country. In 1938, as the highest-paid actor in Hollywood, Cagney was accused of communist sympathies and was brought before the House Committee on UnAmerican Activities. He was exonerated. Through all of this he never lost his passion for his country or his enormous appeal to his fans. During his involvement as Chairman of the Hollywood Victory Committee, James Cagney participated in long domestic and overseas tours to entertain the troops and worked tirelessly to sell war bonds.

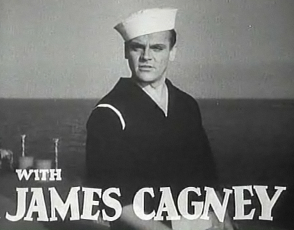

== George Murphy ==
George Murphy was another Chairman of the Victory Committee, and like good friends James Cagney and Ronald Reagan, he would also serve as President of the Screen Actors Guild. Like Reagan, he became active in politics after Chairing the Hollywood Victory Committee and organizing entertainment for the Armed Forces during the Second World War. Hd would serve as a senator from California for the Republican Party.

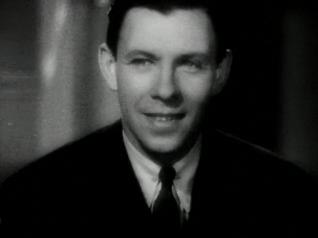
George Murphy in London By Night

== Hattie McDaniel ==
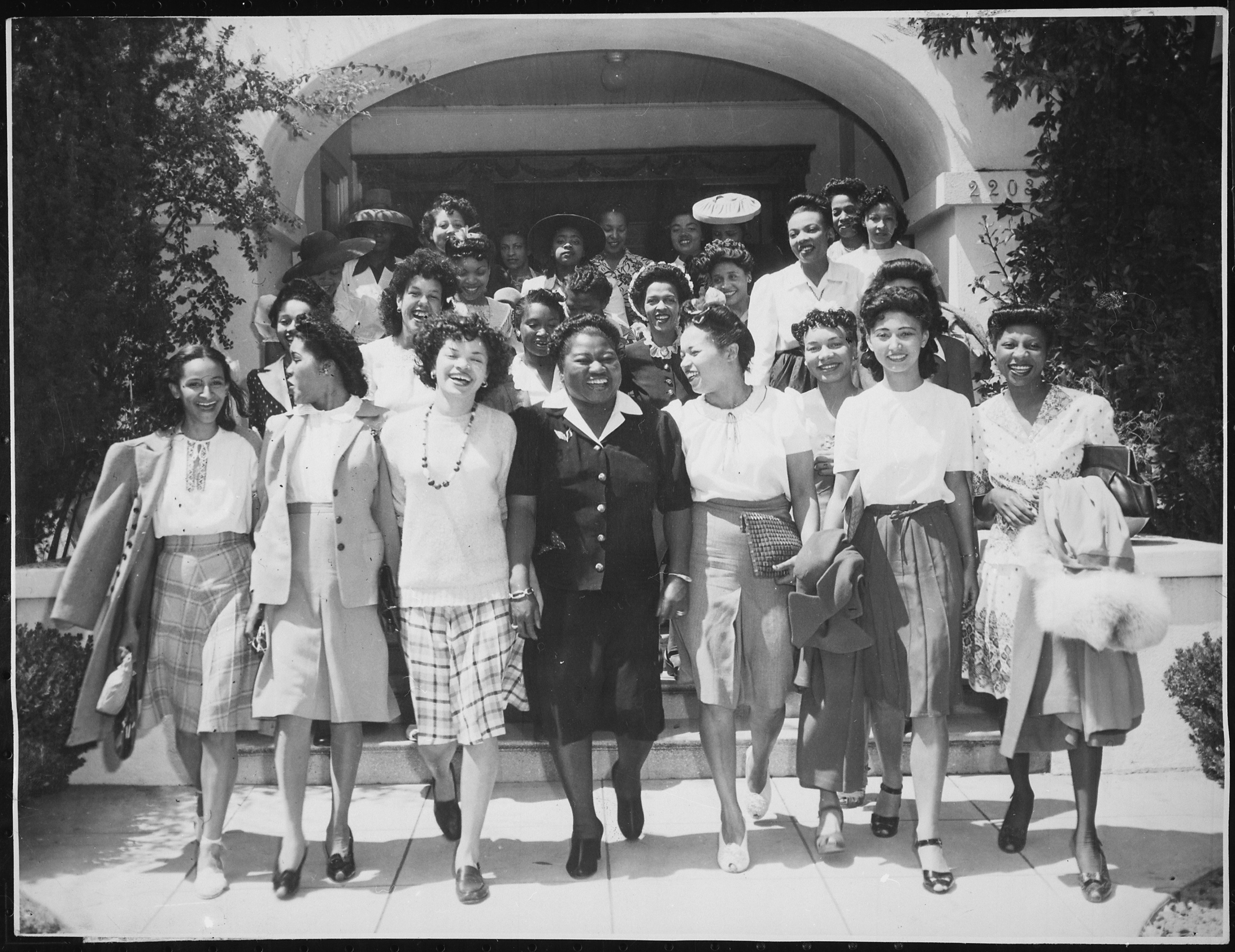
Hattie McDaniel, Chairman of the Negro Division of the Hollywood Victory Committee, and actresses taking time off from rehearsals to go to Minter Field

Hattie McDaniel, famous for her role as Mammy in Gone With the Wind, was the first African-American to win an Academy Award. Her Oscar for her role in Gone With the Wind was criticized by some since she won it playing the role of a slave. Though she generally avoided politics, she became Chairwoman of the Hollywood Victory Committee's Negro Division.

== Hollywood Victory Caravan ==
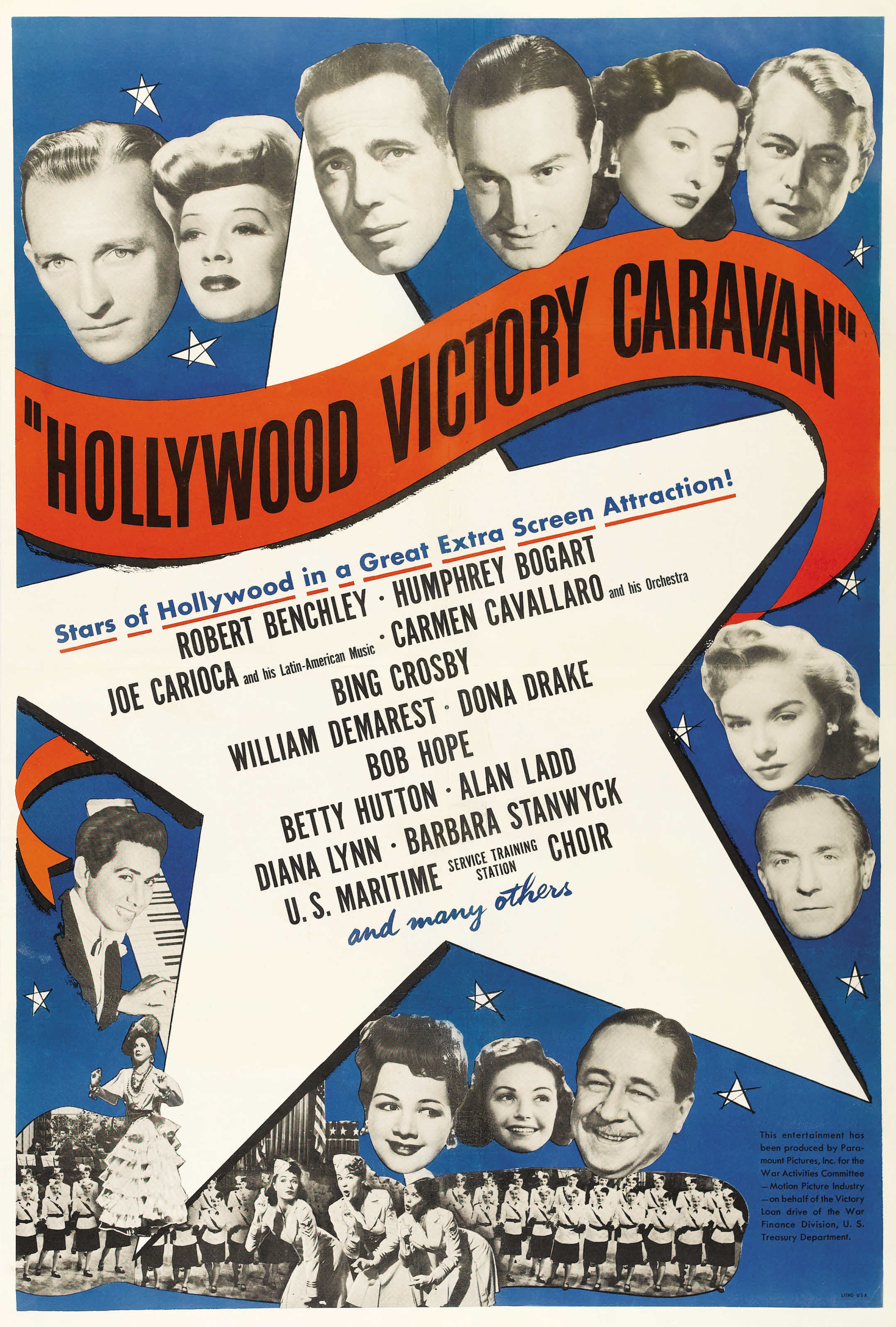
Poster for the Paramount Pictures short film Hollywood Victory Caravan (1945)

One of the most successful projects of the Hollywood Victory Committee was the organization of the Hollywood Victory Caravan in 1942. During a three-week cross country rail tour, performers such as Laurel and Hardy, Bing Crosby, Groucho Marx, Cary Grant, Desi Arnaz and Bob Hope participated in performances and rallies that promoted the Sale of War Bonds. This would become the USA's largest war bond tour of the Second World War. Film stars Bob Hope and Bing Crosby would keep the memory alive in their 1945 movie about a young woman's attempt to travel to Washington DC to visit her brother who was a soldier. They played themselves in this musical comedy that was produced by Paramount Studios for the U.S. Treasury in 1945. It preserves one of the most successful projects of the Hollywood Victory Committee.
