= Bad Boy (1939 film) =

1939 film by Herbert Meyer

- Film poster
- Directed by: Herbert Meyer
- Written by: Richard C. Kahn (original screenplay)
- Starring: Johnny Downs; Rosalind Keith; Helen MacKellar
- Cinematography: Jack Greenhalgh
- Edited by: S. Roy Luby
- Music by: Paul Marquardt
- Distributed by: Monogram Pictures
- Release date: July 10, 1939
- Running time: 65 minutes
- Country: United States
- Language: English

Bad Boy is a 1939 American film directed by Herbert Meyer written by Richard C. Kahn, edited by Roy Luby produced by gateway production, John H. Greenhalgh Jr. Cinematographer and music by Paul Marquardt. Bad Boy was released on 10 July 1939. The film is also known as Perilous Journey in the United Kingdom.

== Plot ==
After graduating college, Johnny leaves his small town and widowed mother(whom he adores), for employment with a reputable engineering firm in an unnamed big city.

Through hard work and late nights, he moves up in the company only to be sidetracked by coworker Steve. Steve pulls Johnny into gambling and late night carousing where he falls for Madeline, a cabaret singer also pursued by Steve. Soon, Johnny is heavily in debt from lavishing expensive gifts and high class lifestyle on his new love. When Steve and Johnny are threatened by bookies over gambling debts, Steve persuades Johnny to embezzle $200 from the company petty cash drawer. Soon, the company discovers the missing money and has Johnny arrested. While in jail, Johnny’s mother visits and is conned by Steve into selling her home to finance his legal defense. Unknown to her, Steve returns the $200 to the company which then drops the charges and Johnny is released from jail. Johnny and his mother move into a small apartment with very little money. Unable to find employment after a lengthy search, Johnny turns to Steve who has become a member of a criminal organization. While doing well in this new endeavor, Johnny takes over the organization after the top two people are killed by rivals with Steve as his #2 man. Now rolling in the money, Johnny moves into a lavish apartment with his mother, then marries Madelon, who clashes with the mother, making Johnny move his mother to a boarding house nearby. Johnny finds that Steve and Madelon are meeting behind his back and plan to steal money from his safe, which he catches them in the act. A fight ensues and Johnny is shot by Steve who then escapes with Madelon and the money. Police had been called to the fight and arrived as the pair were driving away. As the two vehicles raced down the road, the trailing police car fired their guns, fatally striking Steve causing the car to veer and strike a telephone pole at high speed. Meanwhile, after being shot by Steve, Johnny with the help of his chauffeur, goes to his mother. As Johnny lies dying, his mother prays to God to take her son as he is the only one who can help him.

== Cast ==
- Johnny Downs as John Fraser
- Rosalind Keith as Madelon Kirby
- Helen MacKellar as Mrs. Fraser
- Spencer Williams as Terry
- Archie Robbins as Steve Carson
- Holmes Herbert as Mr. McNeil
- Richard Cramer as George
- Harry E. Lang as Vanetti
- Crane Whitley as Henchman
