= Federal Bullets =

1937 film

- Directed by: Karl Brown
- Screenplay by: Karl Brown
- Based on: Federal Bullets by George Fielding Eliot
- Produced by: Scott R. Dunlap
- Starring: Milburn Stone; Zeffie Tilbury; Terry Walker; William Harrigan; Helen MacKellar; Selmer Jackson
- Cinematography: Gilbert Warrenton
- Production company: Monogram Pictures
- Distributed by: Monogram Pictures
- Release date: October 30, 1937
- Running time: 61 minutes
- Country: United States
- Language: English

Federal Bullets is a 1937 American crime film written and directed by Karl Brown. It is based on the 1937 novel Federal Bullets by George Fielding Eliot. The film stars Milburn Stone, Zeffie Tilbury, Terry Walker, William Harrigan, Helen MacKellar and Selmer Jackson. The film was released on October 30, 1937, by Monogram Pictures.

== Cast ==
- Milburn Stone as Tommy Thompson
- Zeffie Tilbury as Mrs. Crippen
- Terry Walker as Milly
- William Harrigan as Chief
- Helen MacKellar as Mrs. Thompson
- Selmer Jackson as Harker
- Matty Fain as 'Barber' John
- Lyle Moraine as Pete
- Warner Richmond as Burke
- Betty Compson as Sue
- Eddie Phillips as Durkin
- John Merton as Manny Goe
- Walter Long as Henchman
