= Delinquent Parents =

- Theatrical release poster
- Directed by: Nick Grinde
- Screenplay by: Nicholas T. Barrows; Robert St. Claire
- Produced by: Ben Judell
- Starring: Doris Weston; Maurice Murphy; Helen MacKellar; Terry Walker<br>Richard Tucker; Charlotte Treadway
- Cinematography: M. A. Anderson
- Edited by: S. Roy Luby
- Production company: Progressive Pictures
- Distributed by: Progressive Pictures
- Release date: July 15, 1938
- Running time: 62 minutes
- Country: United States
- Language: English

Delinquent Parents is a 1938 American crime film directed by Nick Grinde and written by Nicholas T. Barrows and Robert St. Claire. The film stars Doris Weston, Maurice Murphy, Helen MacKellar, Terry Walker, Richard Tucker and Charlotte Treadway. The film was released on July 15, 1938, by Progressive Pictures.

== Plot ==
In the closing days of the Great War, Edith Ellis secretly marries Charles Wharton Jr., a young army lieutenant from an influential family. The Armistice of 11 November 1918 occurs just prior to her husband's sailing to France, his influential family successfully seeks to have their weakling son's marriage annulled. Edith is injured in an automobile accident with Edith and her family keeping her pregnancy secret, putting her child up for adoption.

Edith's daughter is adopted and raised as Carol Caldwell, but in a fit of rage her adoption is revealed to her circle of friends by her former friend. Shamed by not knowing she was adopted, Carol cruelly turns her back on her adopted parents and works as a nightclub singer where she attracts a young crowd to the establishment. Carol's adopted parents turn to their friend Edith Ellis, now an unmarried Judge who doesn't know that Carol is really her daughter.

More complications ensue when Carol's nightclub is secretly owned by a major criminal and Carol is threatened with being charged with contributing to the delinquency of minors.

== Cast ==
- Doris Weston as Carol Wharton Caldwell
- Maurice Murphy as Bruce Jefferson
- Helen MacKellar as Judge Edith Ellis
- Terry Walker as Cousin Betty
- Richard Tucker as Harry Jefferson
- Charlotte Treadway as Mrs. Harry Jefferson
- Morgan Wallace as Charles Wharton
- Marjorie Reynolds as Edythe Ellis
- Theodore von Eltz as Carson
- Walter Young as Joseph Caldwell
- Sibyl Harris as Katherine Caldwell
- Carlyle Moore Jr. as Charles Wharton Jr.
- Janet Young as Mrs. Mihom
- Byron Foulger as Herbert Ellis
- Virginia Brissac as Mrs. Herbert Ellis
- Harry Hayden as Mayor Wharton
- Betty Blythe as Mrs. Wharton
- Marge Champion as Dancer
