= Carol Coombs =

Canadian-born American former actress

- Born: October 15, 1935 (age 90)
- Occupation: Actress
- Known for: It's a Wonderful Life

Carol Coombs (born October 15, 1935) is a Canadian-born American former actress. She appeared in 24 films between 1941 and 1958, although mostly in minor roles. She is probably best-known as Janie Bailey, the piano playing daughter of James Stewart and Donna Reed, in the 1946 film It's a Wonderful Life. In the 1950s, she also had roles in a number of television productions.

Coombs retired from film business in her early twenties and spent the rest of her working life teaching kindergarten and elementary school. As of December 2014, she was a great-grandmother, and she and her husband Chet Mueller, married since 1957, lived in Irvine, California. She has often attended festivals and meetings dealing with It's a Wonderful Life.

== Filmography ==
- Blossoms in the Dust (1941) (uncredited)
- The Man Who Returned to Life (1942)
- On the Sunny Side (1942) (uncredited)
- The Gay Sisters (1942) (uncredited)
- The Adventures of Mark Twain (1944) (uncredited)
- An American Romance (1944) (uncredited)
- The Clock (1945) (uncredited)
- Man Alive (1945) (uncredited)
- Sentimental Journey (1946) (uncredited)
- It's a Wonderful Life (1946) as Janie Bailey (credited as Carol Coomes)
- The Perfect Marriage (1947) (uncredited)
- Driftwood (1947) (uncredited)
- The Boy with Green Hair (1948) (uncredited)
- Knock on Any Door (1949 as Ang Young) (uncredited)
- Mighty Joe Young (1949) (uncredited)
- Tea for Two (1950) (uncredited)
- The Mating Season (1951)
- The Bigelow Theatre (1951, TV series, one episode)
- Fireside Theatre (1951, TV series, one episode)
- Peter Pan (1953) (uncredited voice)
- Scratch Scratch Scratch (1955, short film)
- One Spooky Night (1955, short film)
- My Friend Flicka (1955, TV series, one episode)
- Death Valley Days (1956, TV series, two episodes)
- The Unguarded Moment (1956) (uncredited)
- Cheyenne (1957, TV series, one episode)
- Summer Love (1958) (uncredited)
