= Campus on the March =

1942 short film

- Produced by: Office of War Information
- Release date: 1942
- Running time: 18:07 minutes
- Country: USA
- Language: English

Campus on the March is a short propaganda film produced by the Office of War Information in 1942.

The twenty-minute film exhaustively list the number of institutions of higher learning and many different war activities that have begun at each, including the University of Texas, Texas A&M, Harvard, Dartmouth College and the University of California. There are many different shots of ROTC units and auxiliary formations. Many men are in the military and in college at the same time. Among the war related classes and activities:

- Farm labor
- mechanical engineering
- International relations
- world languages
- chemical weapons preparations
- aviation
- wartime nutrition
- broadcast in Spanish to Latin America to further "understanding of the United Nations cause"
- cryptography
- celestial navigation
- and various war industrial related training

== See also ==
- List of American films of 1942
- List of Allied propaganda films of World War II
- United States home front during World War II
