= A Tornado in the Saddle =

1942 film by William A. Berke

- Theatrical release poster
- Directed by: William Berke
- Screenplay by: Charles F. Royal
- Produced by: Leon Barsha
- Starring: Russell Hayden; Dub Taylor; Alma Carroll; Bob Wills; Tris Coffin; Donald Curtis
- Cinematography: George Meehan
- Edited by: Burton Kramer
- Production company: Columbia Pictures
- Distributed by: Columbia Pictures
- Release date: December 15, 1942
- Running time: 59 minutes
- Country: United States
- Language: English

A Tornado in the Saddle is a 1942 American Western film directed by William Berke and written by Charles F. Royal. The film stars Russell Hayden, Dub Taylor, Alma Carroll, Bob Wills, Tris Coffin and Donald Curtis. The film was released on December 15, 1942, by Columbia Pictures.

== Cast ==
- Russell Hayden as Lucky Crandall
- Dub Taylor as Cannonball
- Alma Carroll as Madge Duncan
- Bob Wills as Bob Wilson
- Tris Coffin as Hutch Dalton
- Donald Curtis as Steve Duncan
- Jack Baxley as Big Bill Bailey
