= Helen MacKellar =

American actress

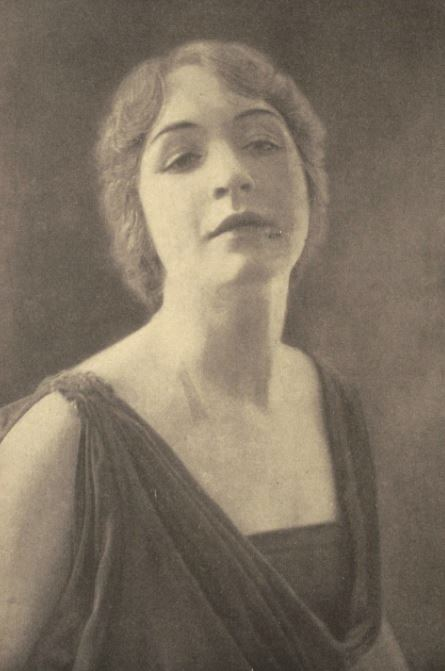
- MacKellar in 1919
- Born: February 13, 1895; Detroit, Michigan
- Died: August 5, 1966 (aged 71); New York City, New York
- Occupation: Actress
- Spouse: George McQuarrie

Helen MacKellar (February 13, 1895 – August 5, 1966) was an American actress.

Born in Detroit, Michigan, MacKeller's ancestry was Scottish and French-Canadian. She studied acting in Chicago and Spokane. Her stage debut came in Spokane in The Whirl of the Town, a musical comedy, when she was 14. She went on to perform in vaudeville and in repertory theatre with the Valencia Stock Company in Los Angeles. Her first acting in the eastern United States was with the Poli Stock Company in New Haven.

MacKellar's film debut came in The Past of Mary Holmes. She also appeared in Two Against the World, Draegerman Courage, The Case of the Stuttering Bishop, Crime School, Little Tough Guy, Barefoot Boy, Valley of the Giants, Disbarred, Boy Slaves, Bad Boy, Northwest Passage, Dark Command, Cheers for Miss Bishop, The Great Mr. Nobody, The Great Train Robbery, Gangs of Sonora, Down Mexico Way, The Man Who Returned to Life, Street of Chance, The Sundown Kid, The Powers Girl and Silver Spurs, among others.

MacKellar's Broadway credits included Dear Ruth (1944), Bloody Laughter (1931), Through the Night (1930), Romancin' Round (1927), Open House (1925), The Mud Turtle (1925), A Good Bad Woman (1925), The Desert Flower (1924), The Masked Woman (1922), The Shadow (1922), Bought and Paid For (1921), Back Pay (1921), The Storm (1919), The Unknown Purple (1918), Major Pendennis (1916), and Seven Chances (1916).

MacKellar was married to George McQuarrie. She died in New York City.

== Filmography ==
Year	Title	Role	Notes
1933	The Past of Mary Holmes	Mary Holmes	
1934	High School Girl	Jane Andrews	
1934	Flirtation	Mrs. Smith	
1936	Two Against the World	Martha Carstairs	
1936	Silver Spurs	Townswoman	Uncredited
1937	Draegerman Courage	Mrs. Mary Haslett	
1937	The Case of the Stuttering Bishop	Stella Kenwood	
1937	Federal Bullets	Mrs. Thompson	
1938	Crime School	Mrs. Burke	
1938	Delinquent Parents	Judge Edith Ellis	
1938	Little Tough Guy	Mrs. Wanaker	
1938	Barefoot Boy	Martha Whittaker	
1938	Valley of the Giants	Mrs. Lorimer	
1939	Disbarred	Abbey Tennant	
1939	Boy Slaves	Jesse's Mother	Uncredited
1939	Honolulu	Middle Telephone Operator	Uncredited
1939	The Gracie Allen Murder Case	Secretary	Uncredited
1939	Bad Boy	Mrs. Fraser	
1939	When Tomorrow Comes	Waitress Who is a Grandmother	Uncredited
1940	Northwest Passage	Sarah Hadden	Uncredited
1940	Women Without Names	Juror	Uncredited
1940	Dark Command	Mrs. Hale	
1940	Three Faces West	Mrs. Welles	
1940	Life with Henry	Sattherwaite's Secretary	Uncredited
1941	Cheers for Miss Bishop	Miss Patton	
1941	The Great Mr. Nobody	Mrs. Barnes	
1941	The Great Train Robbery	Mrs. Logan	
1941	Gangs of Sonora	Kansas Kate Conners	
1941	Down Mexico Way	Miss Abby	Uncredited
1942	The Man Who Returned to Life	Ma Beebe	
1942	Street of Chance	Mrs. Webb, the Landlady	Uncredited
1942	The Sundown Kid	Lucy Randall	
1943	The Powers Girl	Mrs. Hendricks	
1943	Silver Spurs	Mrs. Davis	Uncredited
1944	Lady in the Death House	Prison Matron	Uncredited
