= Ann Ayars =

American soprano and actress (1918–1995)

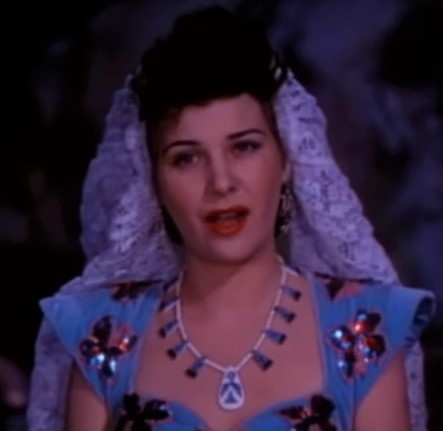
- Ayars in Fiesta (1941)
- Born: July 23, 1918; Los Angeles, California, U.S.
- Died: February 27, 1995 (aged 76); Hemet, California, U.S.
- Occupations: Opera singer; actress; college music professor
- Years active: 1941–1967
- Known for: Dr. Kildare Pictures; Fiesta; The Tales of Hoffmann

Ann Ayars (July 23, 1918 – February 27, 1995) was an American soprano, actress, and music teacher. Early in her career she acted in several TV series and non musical films. Later, she sang with the New York City Opera (NYCO), and became known worldwide when she sang and acted the part of Antonia in the 1951 British film The Tales of Hoffmann.

== Biography ==
Ann Ayars was born in Los Angeles, California and began as a singer in the late 1930s and started acting in the early 1940s. She had parts in several television series, including Batman, Hazel, Mission: Impossible, The Alfred Hitchcock Hour, Perry Mason, The Virginian and The Monroes.

She starred as Cholita in the 1941 film Fiesta and in 1942 she was Cynthia Cookie Charles in Dr. Kildare's Victory. Also in 1942, she appeared as Constance Selden in Apache Trail, Kaaren de Relle in Nazi Agent and Juliette in Reunion in France. In 1943 she was Mrs Sandoval in The Human Comedy and Susan Thayer in The Youngest Profession.

She left Hollywood in 1943 to join the newly formed New York City Opera, becoming one of its leading lyric sopranos. Her operatic roles included Monica in The Medium, Mimi in La bohème and Violetta in La traviata. Her friend, mezzo-soprano Frances Bible, said "Her work with the opera has inspired many young singers, many of whom went on to professional careers." Courtesy of MGM, Ayars helped entertain the troops in February 1944 at Camp Roberts, California, starring in Rio Rita along with Janis Paige. She starred as Antonia in the 1951 Powell and Pressburger film The Tales of Hoffmann, which was based on the opéra fantastique by Jacques Offenbach. Although all the parts in the film are sung, only Robert Rounseville (Hoffmann) and Ayars sang their own parts, the rest were all dubbed.

In 1968, she returned to California. From 1968 to 1987, she taught voice and piano and staged 19 full-length opera productions at Mt. San Jacinto College in California, where she was made a professor emerita. where she staged 19 full-length opera productions.

== Last years and death ==
She retired in 1987. She died on February 27, 1995 at her home in Hemet in Riverside County, aged 76, following complications from diabetes.

== Selected filmography ==
- The Virginian (1963) (Season 2 Episode 7: "Brother Thaddeus") as Sister St. Luke
- The Alfred Hitchcock Hour (1964) (Season 2 Episode 14: "Beyond the Sea of Death") as Lucy Barrington
- Perry Mason (1964) (Season 8 Episode 2: "The Case of the Paper Bullets") as Woman Reporter
- Batman (1966) (Season 1 Episode 23: "The Ring of Wax") as Madame Soleil
- Mission: Impossible (1966) (Season 1 Episode 13: "Elena") as Señora Del Barra
