= The Sundown Kid =

1942 film by Elmer Clifton

- Theatrical release poster
- Directed by: Elmer Clifton
- Screenplay by: Norman S. Hall
- Story by: Edward J. White
- Produced by: Edward J. White
- Starring: Don "Red" Barry; Ian Keith; Helen MacKellar; Linda Leighton; Emmett Lynn; Wade Crosby
- Cinematography: Ernest Miller
- Edited by: William P. Thompson
- Music by: Mort Glickman
- Production company: Republic Pictures
- Distributed by: Republic Pictures
- Release date: December 28, 1942
- Running time: 59 minutes
- Country: United States
- Language: English

The Sundown Kid is a 1942 American Western film directed by Elmer Clifton and written by Norman S. Hall. The film stars Don "Red" Barry, Ian Keith, Helen MacKellar, Linda Leighton, Emmett Lynn and Wade Crosby. The film was released on December 28, 1942, by Republic Pictures.

== Cast ==
- Don "Red" Barry as Red Tracy aka Red Brennan
- Ian Keith as J. Richard Spencer
- Helen MacKellar as Lucy Randall
- Linda Leighton as Lynne Parsons
- Emmett Lynn as Pop Tanner
- Wade Crosby as Vince Ganley
- Ted Adams as Jim Dawson
- Fern Emmett as Mrs. Agnes Peabody
- Bud Geary as Henchman Nick
- Bob Kortman as Henchman Luke
- Kenne Duncan as Henchman
