= Apache Trail (film) =

1942 American Western film

- Theatrical release poster
- Directed by: Richard Thorpe; Richard Rosson (uncredited)
- Screenplay by: Maurice Geraghty; Gordon Kahn
- Based on: Stage Station; 1939 story in Collier's by Ernest Haycox
- Produced by: Samuel Marx
- Starring: Lloyd Nolan; Donna Reed; William Lundigan; Ann Ayars; Connie Gilchrist; Chill Wills
- Cinematography: Sidney Wagner
- Edited by: Frank Sullivan
- Music by: Sol Kaplan
- Production company: Metro-Goldwyn-Mayer
- Distributed by: Loew's Inc.
- Release date: June 24, 1942
- Running time: 66 minutes
- Country: United States
- Language: English

Apache Trail is a 1942 American Western film directed by Richard Thorpe, written by Maurice Geraghty, and starring Lloyd Nolan, Donna Reed, William Lundigan, Ann Ayars, Connie Gilchrist, and Chill Wills. The picture was released on June 24, 1942, by Metro-Goldwyn-Mayer.

== Plot ==
Tom O'Folliard (William Lundigan) is released from jail and seeks work at his prior employer, a stagecoach line. He is sent to manage a stagecoach rest stop in a remote area. Upon arrival, he meets a woman, Señora Martinez (Connie Gilchrist) and her daughter Rosalia (Donna Reed) who cook and clean at the rest stop. When the next stage arrives, among its cargo is a strong box with cash. Soon after, Folliard's brother "Trigger" Bill Folliard (Lloyd Nolan), a known outlaw arrives and seeks shelter from the local Apaches, whom he has offended. Upon his discovery that a strong box is present, he plans to steal it and make a getaway.

During Tom Folliard's absence from the rest stop, Trigger Bill gets the upper hand on the stagecoach line employees watching him and tries to escape with the proceeds but is thwarted by his brother's arrival back at the rest stop. Soon thereafter, the Apaches attack the rest stop but are repulsed. They demand Trigger Bill and in return they will leave the rest stop alone. A vote is taken by all those in the rest stop with Tom casting the deciding vote to not give his brother to the Apaches. During the next attack Bill, previously expertly shot through both hands by his brother, elects in noble fashion to sacrifice himself to save the others by riding away from the rest stop. Meanwhile, Tom, after a brief flirtation with one of the stagecoach passengers, Constance Selden (Ann Ayars), tells Señora Martinez that he would like to court her daughter.

== Cast ==
- Lloyd Nolan as Trigger Bill Folliard
- Donna Reed as Rosalia Martinez
- William Lundigan as Tom O'Folliard
- Ann Ayars as Constance Selden
- Connie Gilchrist as Señora Martinez
- Chill Wills as 'Pike' Skelton
- Miles Mander as James V. Thorne
- Gloria Holden as Mrs. James V. Thorne
- Ray Teal as Ed Cotton
- Grant Withers as 'Les' Lestrade
- Fuzzy Knight as Juke
- Trevor Bardette as Amber
- Tito Renaldo as Cochee
- Frank M. Thomas as Maj. Lowden
- George Watts as Judge Keeley
- Mitchell Lewis as Bolt Saunders (uncredited)
