= Marcella Martin =

American actress (1916–1986)

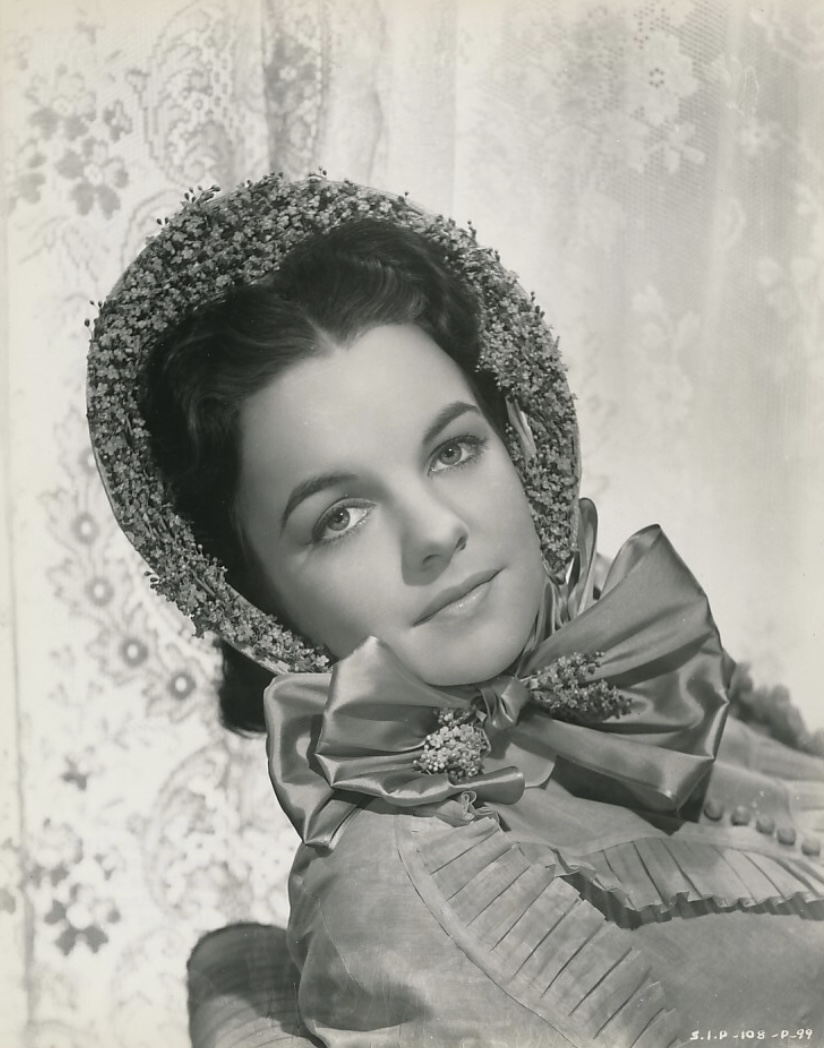
- Martin in Gone with the Wind (1939)
- Born: Elsie Marcella Clifford; June 5, 1916; Champaign, Illinois, U.S.
- Died: October 31, 1986 (aged 70); Houston, Texas, U.S.
- Resting place: Saint Marys Cemetery, Champaign, Illinois
- Years active: 1939–1969
- Spouse(s): John Martin; James Ferguson (divorced); Robert Lee McGratty

Marcella Martin (born Elsie Marcella Clifford; June 5, 1916 – October 31, 1986) was an American actress, remembered for her role as Cathleen Calvert in Gone with the Wind (1939).

== Life and career ==
Born in Illinois, Marcella Martin lived with her first husband John Martin in Shreveport (Louisiana) in the late 1930s. She appeared at auditions held at The Shreveport Little Theatre, where she was found by Hollywood agents who were Searching for Scarlett. Martin was screen-tested for playing Scarlett O'Hara in David O. Selznick's Gone with the Wind and was for some weeks a leading candidate for the role. Selznick's agent Maxwell Arnow described Martin as "quite good looking" with a "nice figure". Arnow also called her a "grand actress" and "without doubt (...) the best of the hundreds of people that I interviewed during my trip".

Scarlett O'Hara was later played by Vivien Leigh in the film, but Martin also received a credited supporting part as Southern belle Cathleen Calvert, who tells Scarlett O'Hara at the Twelve Oaks staircase about Rhett Butler. She also served as Leigh's coach in Southern dialect through the movie and was reportedly her roommate on location. Marcella Martin later played love interests to the leading role in the Columbia Pictures movies West of Tombstone (1942) and The Man Who Returned to Life (1942). In the 1960s she appeared in a supporting role in the film Voyage to the End of the Universe (1964) and played Ruth Collier in the episode Boomerang of the television series The F.B.I..

Marcella Martin was married three times. She died on October 31, 1986, at the age of 70. She is buried at Saint Marys Cemetery in Champaign, Illinois.

== Filmography ==
- Gone with the Wind (1939) - Cathleen Calvert
- West of Tombstone (1942) - Carol Barnet
- The Man Who Returned to Life (1942) - Daphne Turner
- Voyage to the End of the Universe (1964)
- Another World (1966–67; TV Series) -Flo Murray
- The F.B.I. (1969, TV Series) - Ruth Collier
