= The News Parade of the Year 1942 =

1942 film

- Directed by: Eugene W. Castle
- Release date: 1942

The News Parade of the Year 1942 is a 1942 9-minute documentary film made in the United States and directed by Eugene W. Castle for his Castle Films home movie reel company. It is composed of newsreel footage of wartime activity and includes footage of Joseph Stalin, Winston Churchill and others. The Detroit Institute of Arts has it in its catalog. Ball State University also has a copy.
