= The Man Who Returned to Life =

1940 film by Lew Landers

- Directed by: Lew Landers
- Screenplay by: Gordon Rigby
- Story by: Samuel W. Taylor
- Produced by: Wallace MacDonald
- Starring: John Howard; Lucile Fairbanks; Ruth Ford; Marcella Martin
- Cinematography: Philip Tannura
- Edited by: Art Seid
- Music by: Morris Stoloff
- Distributed by: Columbia Pictures
- Release date: February 5, 1942
- Running time: 61 minutes
- Country: United States
- Language: English

The Man Who Returned to Life is a 1942 American black-and-white drama film directed by Lew Landers, written by Gordon Rigby and released by Columbia Pictures.

== Plot ==
David Jameson lives in a rural town in Maryland. He is forced to flee after he is suspected of murdering Beth Beebe, who tried to force him to marry her although he was engaged to another woman, Daphne Turner. He flees from town and takes on a new identity as George Bishop, marries Jane Meadows, and gets a comfortable job. Years later a skeleton is found on the Jameson farm. Believed to be the remains of Jameson, Beth's brother, Clyde Beebe, is charged with the murder and sentenced to die. David returns to his home town in an attempt to exonerate Clyde.

== Cast ==
- John Howard as David Hampton Jameson / George Bishop
- Lucile Fairbanks as Jane Meadows Bishop
- Ruth Ford as Beth Beebe
- Marcella Martin as Daphne Turner
- Roger Clark as Harland Walker
- Elisabeth Risdon as Minerva Sunday
- Paul Guilfoyle as Clyde Beebe
- Clancy Cooper as Clem Beebe
- Helen MacKellar as Ma Beebe
- Kenneth MacDonald as Officer Fosse
- Carol Coombs as Marjorie Bishop / Angel Face
- Marguerite De La Motte as Mrs. Hibbard
- Lois Collier as Mary Tuller
- Minta Durfee as Mrs. Tuller
