= West of Tombstone =

1942 film by Howard Bretherton

- Directed by: Howard Bretherton
- Screenplay by: Maurice Geraghty
- Produced by: William Berke
- Cinematography: George Meehan
- Edited by: Mel Thorsen
- Music by: Jack A. Goodrich
- Production company: Columbia Pictures
- Distributed by: Columbia Pictures
- Release date: January 15, 1942
- Running time: 59 minutes
- Country: United States
- Language: English

West of Tombstone is an American Western B-movie film directed by Howard Bretherton and starring Charles Starrett.

== Plot ==
Marshal Steve Langdon hears a rumor that the legendary criminal Billy the Kid is maybe still alive. Langdon finds Billy's coffin empty and believes that the respected older citizen Wilfred Barnet is Billy the Kid. He informs Wilfred's lovely daughter Carol about. When Barnet confesses his true identity to his daughter and says that he got a second chance by Pat Garrett to start a new life. His clerk overhears the conversation and informs his old gang and this leads to trouble. Barnet helps Marshal Langdon against the gang. They defeat the gang but Barnet is mortally wounded. Steve decides to let the old man rest in peace and reports that Billy the Kid died long ago.

== Cast ==
- Charles Starrett as Marshal Steve Langdon
- Russell Hayden as Lucky Barnet
- Cliff Edwards as Harmony Haines
- Marcella Martin as Carol Barnet
- Gordon De Main as Wilfred Barnet
- Clancy Cooper as Dave Shurlock
- Jack Kirk as the Sheriff
- Budd Buster as Wheeler
- Tom London as Morris
- Lloyd Bridges as Martin (uncredited)
