= Nazi Agent =

1942 film by Jules Dassin

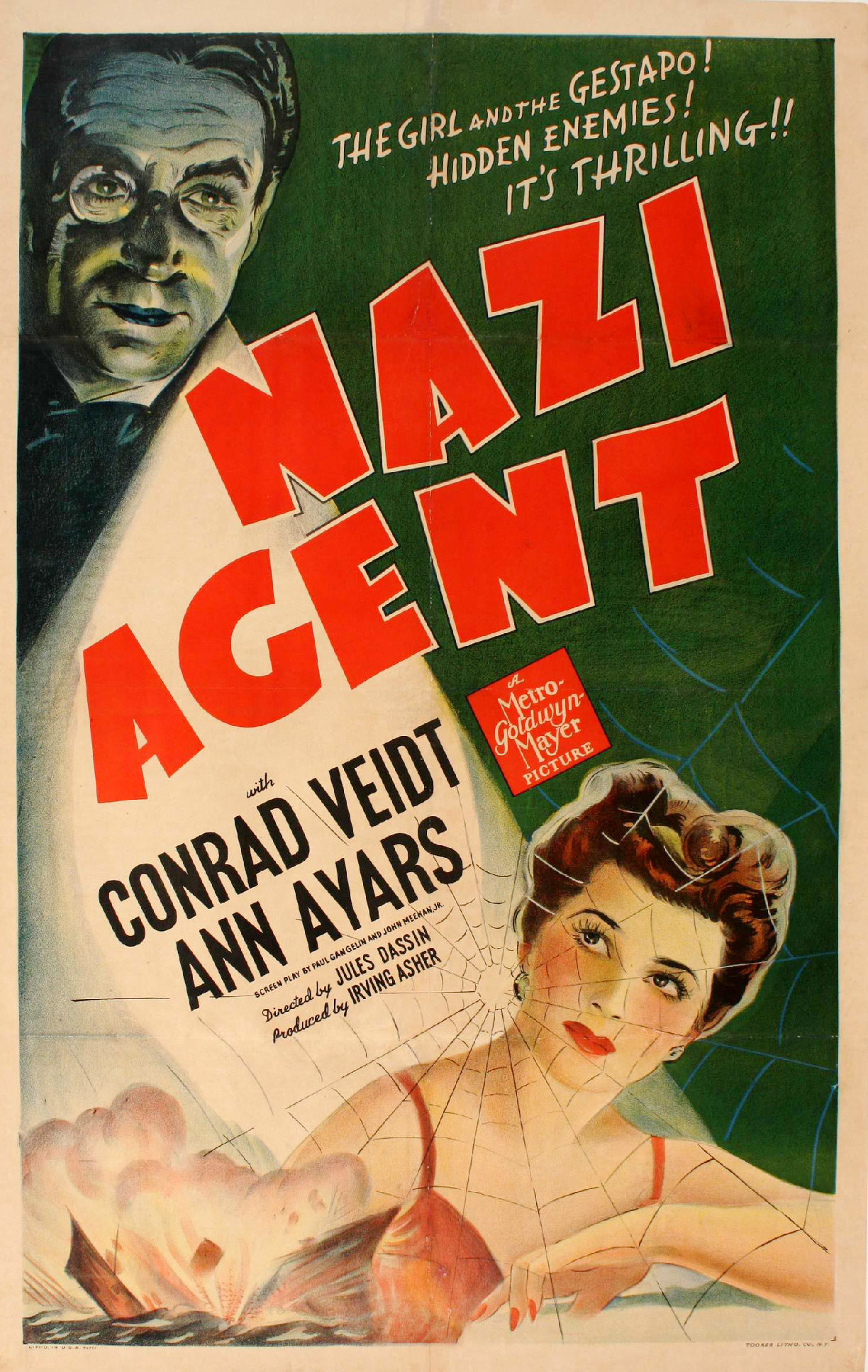
- Theatrical release poster
- Directed by: Jules Dassin
- Written by: Paul Gangelin; John Meehan Jr.; Lothar Mendes
- Produced by: Irving Asher
- Starring: Conrad Veidt; Ann Ayars; Frank Reicher
- Cinematography: Harry Stradling
- Edited by: Frank E. Hull
- Music by: David Snell
- Production company: Metro-Goldwyn-Mayer
- Distributed by: Loew's Inc.
- Release date: January 21, 1942
- Running time: 83 minutes
- Country: United States
- Language: English

Nazi Agent is a 1942 American spy film directed by Jules Dassin, in his first feature-length film for MGM. It stars Conrad Veidt playing identical twins, one loyal to the United States (U.S.), the other a dedicated German Nazi.

== Plot ==
The U.S. has not yet entered World War II when kindly stamp dealer Otto Becker (Conrad Veidt) is unexpectedly visited by his twin brother, Baron Hugo von Detner, the new German consul to the U.S. and one of the leaders of a spy ring engaged in sabotage. The brothers have not seen each other in years, but now von Detner wants to use Becker's shop to transmit and receive secret messages. Becker refuses, until von Detner threatens to have him deported back to Germany as an illegal immigrant and reveals that Becker's assistant, Miss Harper (Dorothy Tree), is actually a German agent.

Becker becomes a prisoner in his own store, watched constantly. When he gives his good friend and fellow stamp enthusiast, Professor Jim Sterling (Ivan F. Simpson), a message to go to the police, Sterling is killed in a "traffic accident". Von Detner then comes to deal with the betrayal by his brother; the two men struggle and the Nazi is shot dead. Thinking quickly, Becker assumes von Detner's identity.

Nobody detects the substitution except Fritz (Frank Reicher), an old family servant and lately von Detner's butler; Becker first realizes that Fritz has discovered his true identity when he sees that Fritz left him a glass of milk as a nightcap instead of wine, knowing that Becker has always preferred this more-healthful beverage instead of alcohol --- "I knew it was you, Otto, when I saw the old bayonet-scar on your back as I was helping you dress after your shower; remember that I myself tended that wound for you." Fritz remains faithful to Becker, however, and keeps his secret. Meanwhile, as he continues to pass as von Detner, Becker starts feeding what he learns about the spy ring's operations to the police via anonymous telephone calls.

Becker becomes acquainted with Kaaren De Relle (Anne Ayars). She had been a secret agent loyal to the Nazis, but has become disillusioned by what she has seen and now continues with her duties for the spy ring only to prevent the Nazis from taking retribution against her family still in occupied France. She had spurned von Detner's romantic advances in the past. However, she finds the baron changed, and for the better, when Becker shows sympathy for her plight.

Information provided by Becker foils a plot to blow up a freighter loaded with explosive chemicals in the Panama Canal. He also learns the names of German agents working in America; he mails the list, omitting De Relle's name, to the FBI. Amid the betrayal and failure of their plans, some members of the spy ring turn against and kill each other; others are arrested.

Eventually, the only ones left are Becker, De Relle and Kurt Richten (Martin Kosleck), von Detner's aide at the embassy. Aware now of Becker's true identity and the fact that he was the informant, Richten threatens to punish him by notifying the authorities that De Relle is a spy. Becker sacrifices himself to save De Relle by offering to allow Richten to become Nazi hero by taking Becker, still posing as Consul von Detmer, back to Germany to be turned over to the Nazis as a traitor.

== Cast ==
- Conrad Veidt as Otto Becker/Baron Hugo von Detner
- Ann Ayars as Kaaren De Relle
- Frank Reicher as Fritz
- Dorothy Tree as Miss Harper
- Ivan Simpson as Professor Sterling
- William Tannen as Ludwig
- Martin Kosleck as Kurt Richten
- Marc Lawrence as Joe Aiello
- Sidney Blackmer as Arnold Milbar
- Moroni Olsen as Brenner
- Pierre Watkin as Grover Blaine McHenry
- Jeff York as Keeler (uncredited)

== Production ==
Principal photography on Nazi Agent began in early November 1941 and ended on December 16, 1941, after the attack on Pearl Harbor and Germany's declaration of war against the United States. The film is considered a war propaganda film. The film was first announced under the title Out of the Past.

== Reception ==
The New York Times film critic Bosley Crowther wrote, "The story turns entirely on a neat melodramatic trick. Mr. Veidt as a simple, unpretentious and loyal naturalized American is coerced by his twin, a Nazi consul, into assisting with some spy activities. But the moment comes when he is able to kill his brother without any one seeing the deed, and he takes this opportunity to place himself in the evil brother's shoes. His purpose thereby is, of course, to spy upon the spies ..."
