= Reunion in France =

1942 feature film directed by Jules Dassin

- Original movie poster
- Directed by: Jules Dassin
- Written by: Ladislaus Bus-Fekete; Contributing Writer: Charles Hoffman
- Screenplay by: Jan Lustig; Marvin Borowsky; Marc Connelly
- Produced by: Joseph L. Mankiewicz
- Starring: Joan Crawford; John Wayne; Philip Dorn; Reginald Owen; Albert Bassermann; John Carradine; Ann Ayars; J. Edward Bromberg
- Cinematography: Robert H. Planck
- Edited by: Elmo Veron
- Music by: Franz Waxman
- Distributed by: Metro-Goldwyn-Mayer
- Release date: December 25, 1942
- Running time: 102 minutes
- Country: United States
- Language: English
- Budget: $1,054,000
- Box office: $1,863,000

Reunion in France is a 1942 American war film distributed by Metro-Goldwyn-Mayer starring Joan Crawford, John Wayne, and Philip Dorn in a story about a woman in occupied France who, learning her well-heeled lover has German connections, aids a downed American flyer. Ava Gardner appears in a small uncredited role as a Parisian shopgirl. The movie was directed by Jules Dassin.

== Plot ==
It is 1940 in Paris. Michele de la Becque is a wealthy socialite in love with industrial designer Robert Cortot. They enjoy a luxurious lifestyle unfazed by the approach of World War II. The two become engaged.

After the Battle of France and subsequent German occupation, Michele discovers her fiancé is socializing with Nazi officers, including General Schroeder, the military commandant of Paris; and the SS Gruppenführer in charge of the Gestapo in the Greater Paris region. Cortot's factories are manufacturing heavy duty trucks and weapons for the Germans. She confronts him, and he does not deny her evidence. She is outraged by his collaboration.

She aids a downed American flyer, a volunteer in the e Royal Air Force's Eagle Squadron, pilot Pat Talbot from Pennsylvania. She finds herself falling in love with him. Michele makes contact with the Resistance and with their aid, arranges for Talbot's escape. The Germans are becoming suspicious of both her and Cortot, but do not impede Cortot's obtaining travel papers to Lisbon. Under the cover of a weekend trip to Fontainebleau, with Talbot disguised as her chauffeur, Michele takes him to a field in the country where an RAF patrol bomber will take him and two members of the British Special Operations Executive (SOE) back to England. Along the way, she learns that Cortot is a major leader, perhaps the leader, of the French Resistance. As the aircraft approaches the field, Pat urges Michele to board and escape to England with them.

Back in Paris, General Schroeder and the Gruppenführer have become suspicious of Cortot. Too many of his trucks are suffering transmission failures after running a couple of thousand miles. The Gruppenführer accuses him of sabotage; he replies that his responsibility ends after the design is approved - and acidly comments he cannot be held responsible for the failures when the Germans are providing him with substandard materials and locking up his engineers in concentration camps. The SS officer them questions him about Michele's activities, asserting she had never arrived at Fontainebleau, and orders Cortot to accompany him to Gestapo headquarters for further questioning.

As Cortot, General Schroeder, and the Gruppenführer are leaving Cortot's house, Michele walks through the front door, apparently delighted to see them all. When asked, she explains she felt lonely because her fiancé Robert was not with her, turned around, and returned to Paris to be with him. This explanation satisfies the general, and he orders the Gruppenführer to release Cortot's butler, being held as an accomplice. The Germans drive away, Schroeder feeling vindicated that his friend is loyal to Germany, the SS officer disgusted because he has been made to look foolish. Cortot, Michele, and the butler wave goodbye as the Boche leave.

As they stand in the doorway, some children across the street spit in their direction and curse them. Cortot comments that one day, they will understand resistance to the enemy takes many forms. A British airplane is flying over the city, and Cortot comments that the Germans no longer shoot at it, as it drops no bombs; but in fact if the Germans knew the French, they would see it is deadly dangerous to them. It skywrites the word "COURAGE" in the sky over Paris for all to see.

== Cast ==
- Joan Crawford as Michele de la Becque
- John Wayne as Pat Talbot
- Philip Dorn as Robert Cortot
- Reginald Owen as Gestapo agent
- John Carradine as Head of the Paris Gestapo
- Moroni Olsen as Gerbeau
- Natalie Schafer as Amy Schröder
- Albert Bassermann as General Hugo Schroeder
- Ann Ayars as Juliette
- J. Edward Bromberg as Durand
- Henry Daniell as Emile Fleuron
- Howard Da Silva as Anton Stregel (as Howard da Silva)
- Charles Arnt as Honoré
- Morris Ankrum as Martin
- Peter Whitney as soldier (uncredited)
- Edith Evanson as Genevieve
- Ernst Deutsch as Captain (as Ernest Dorian)
- Ava Gardner as shopgirl Marie (uncredited)
- Odette Myrtil as Mme. Montanot
- Margaret Laurence as Clothilde

== Reception ==
The movie made $1,046,000 in the U.S. and Canada and $817,000 in other markets, earning MGM a profit of $222,000.

Film Daily noted "The film, directed capably by Jules Dassin, has been given a first-rate production by Joseph L. Mankiewicz."

T.S. in The New York Times observed: "If Reunion in France is the best tribute that Hollywood can muster to the French underground forces of liberation, then let us try another time. [The film is] simply a stale melodramatic exercise for a very popular star. In the role of a spoiled rich woman who finds her 'soul' in the defeat of France, Joan Crawford is adequate to the story provided her, but that is hardly adequate to the theme."

== See also ==
- John Wayne filmography
