= George Fielding Eliot =

American writer and journalist (1894–1971)

- Born: 22 June 1894; Brooklyn, New York
- Died: 21 April 1971 (aged 76); Torrington, Connecticut
- Education: University of Melbourne
- Occupations: Writer and journalist
- Writing career
- Genres: horror; crime; military; science fiction
- Subjects: military; politics
- World War I career
- Allegiance: Australia
- Branch: Army (Infantry)
- Rank: Major (acting)
- Conflicts: World War I; Gallipoli campaign; Western Front; Battle of the Somme; Battle of Passchendaele; Battle of Arras; Battle of Amiens
- U.S. Army career
- Allegiance: United States
- Branch: Army (Intelligence)
- Rank: Major

George Fielding Eliot (22 June 1894 – 21 April 1971) was an American soldier, historian and author. He published 15 books on military and political matters in the 1930s through the 1960s, wrote a syndicated column on military affairs and was the military analyst on radio and on television for CBS News during World War II.

== Early life ==
George Fielding Eliot was born in Brooklyn, New York. His parents moved with him to Australia when he was eight years old. He attended the University of Melbourne in Australia, where he joined the school's cadet corps and rose to its highest rank.

== Military career ==
When World War I began, Fielding became a second lieutenant in the Australian infantry, and fought in the Gallipoli Campaign from May to August 1915. In 1916 he was transferred to the European theatre, and fought at the battles of the Somme, Passchendaele, Arras, and Amiens. He was wounded twice and was an acting major at war's end.

After the war, he moved to Canada and became a member of the Royal Canadian Mounted Police. He returned to the United States and served as a reserve officer in the U.S. Army reserve, in military intelligence, from 1922 to 1933, where he rose to the rank of major. He resigned so he would have greater freedom to write and speak about military affairs and the coming war.

== Author, commentator, military analyst ==
While working as an accountant and auditor in Kansas, Missouri and Oklahoma in the 1920s, he started writing articles and stories. He wrote pulp fiction starting in 1926 as well as crime novels. The movie Federal Bullets (1937) was based on his novels of the same name. In 1937 he wrote (with R. Ernest Dupuy) the widely cited If War Comes. In 1938 he wrote The Ramparts We Watch, a widely cited book which made predictions of the coming war and made recommendations for strengthening national defence. In 1938 he wrote an article for The American Mercury titled "The impossible war with Japan", in which he said "a Japanese attack upon Hawaii is a strategic impossibility" for which he was much ridiculed after the 1941 Pearl Harbor attack. The article did accurately note that the capture of Hawaii would have required greater naval resources than Japan possessed, but that they could launch air raids against coastal cities, and could easily capture the Philippine Islands, with the defeated U.S. forces having to retreat to the fortress of Corregidor before help could arrive, and that years of island hopping would be required to capture island bases before an ultimate defeat of Japan.

During World War II, he wrote books and articles on the war and military strategy, which were featured in such publications as Life. He also wrote for Harper's Magazine, Current History, and The American Mercury. Another nonfiction military book he wrote was Bombs Bursting in Air. In this book Fielding outlines the likelihood of German bombing raids on London which would be made possible from bases in Belgium and the Netherlands. Additionally, he laid out the defence needs for projecting American air power into the Atlantic, which would later be realized with the Destroyers for Bases Agreement in September 1940. He broadcast coverage of the Second World War from London along with Edward R. Murrow and H. V. Kaltenborn in 1939. He continued as commentator on war strategy on CBS radio after the entry of the United States into the war.

On 7 December 1941, when U.S. forces at Pearl Harbor were attacked by Japanese airplanes, Eliot not only broadcast on radio, but on the 10 hours of CBS television coverage of the attack and the war to follow. This was the first extended television coverage of a breaking major news event. Eliot was a staff writer for the New York Herald Tribune for many years. He continued to write books and articles about military strategy and world politics into the 1960s, for the popular press as well as the scholarly journal Foreign Affairs.

== Later life ==
According to Clark Eichelberger, in 1948 director of the American Association for the United Nations, Eliot at that time "enjoyed the confidence of Secretary of State George Marshall", and his writings were considered to represent the viewpoint of the U.S. State Department, including support for Zionism. He was a target in the early 1950s of columnist Westbrook Pegler for his association with what Pegler considered leftist organizations.

== Personal life ==
Eliot resided in New York City during much of his writing and broadcasting career. He married Sara Elaine Hodges in 1933, and they divorced in 1942. He married June Cawley Hynd in 1943. They resided in Litchfield, Connecticut. He died in Torrington, Connecticut, on 21 April 1971 after a lengthy illness. His wife June died in 1973.

== Selective bibliography ==
=== Fiction ===
- "The Copper Bowl" (1928); short horror story; Weird Tales, December 1928, widely reprinted.
- "The Justice of the Czar" (1928); short fiction; Weird Tales, August 1928
- "His Brother's Keeper" (1931); short fiction; Weird Tales, September 1931
- The Eagles of Death (1930); book (crime).
- Federal Bullets: a Mystery Story (1936); book (crime).
- The Purple Legion: a G-man Thriller (1936); book (crime)
- The Navy Spy Murders (1937); book (crime)
- Caleb Pettengill, U.S.N. (1956); book (military)
- "The Peacemakers" (1960); short science fiction; Fantastic Universe, January 1960.
- Bring 'Em Back Dead (2012); book (crime). Reprinted by Black Dog Books, Normal, Il. ISBN 978-1884449277

=== Non-fiction ===
- If War Comes, by R Ernest Dupuy & George Fielding Eliot (1937)
- The Ramparts We Watch – a Study of the Problems of American National Defense (1938).
- The Military Consequences of Munich (1938).
- Bombs Bursting in Air: The Influence of Air Power On International Relations (1939).
- Defending America (1939) (pamphlet).
- Hour of Triumph (1944).
- The Strength We Need, a Military Program for America Pending Peace (1946).
- Hate, Hope and High Explosives, a Report on the Middle East (1948).
- If Russia Strikes (1949).
- The H-Bomb (1950).
- Decision in Korea (1954).
- Introduction for Mr. Lincoln's Admirals by Clarence E. Macartney (1956).
- Victory Without War 1958–1961 (1958).
- Soldiers and Governments: Nine Studies in Civil-Military Relations, by George Fielding Eliot & Michael Howard (1959).
- Sylvanus Thayer of West Point (1959).
- Reserve forces and the Kennedy Strategy (1962).
- Daring Sea Warrior, Franklin Buchanan (1962).
- A Concise History of World War I (1964).

== Listen to ==
- Recording of Major George Fielding Eliot, CBS News Analysis, 14 January 1942 History Happens Here – Missouri History Museum. Retrieved 24 February 2010.
