= Alma Carroll =

American actress (1924–2019)

- Carroll c.1940
- Born: January 11, 1924; Los Angeles, California, U.S.
- Died: May 3, 2019 (aged 95)
- Occupation: Actress
- Years active: 1942–1952
- Spouse: Bill Lignante

Alma Carroll (January 11, 1924 – May 3, 2019) was an American actress who was named Miss America of National Defense at the age of 17.

== Early years ==
Carroll was born in Los Angeles, California on January 11, 1924, as the daughter of Mrs. Ernest A. Stevens. Her first appearance in film was a role in an Our Gang short in 1927, when she was 3 years old. She attended University High School and worked as a photographer's model. She planned to be a teacher or a medical doctor until her entry in a beauty contest changed the direction of her career.

== Career ==
When she was 18, Carroll signed with Columbia Studios. Her first film was Submarine Raider, which was followed by Parachute Nurse. She also appeared in They All Kissed the Bride, Belle of the Yukon, Cinderella Jones, and Up in Arms.

In 1941, representatives of the Army, Navy, and Marine Corps selected Carroll as "Miss America of National Defense". The competition in Venice, California, involved 100 or more young women. After her victory, Carroll and "traveling welcomette" Janet Mantell, toured military bases around the United States, including those in Salt Lake City, Denver, Omaha, and Quantico. The tour totaled 9,000 miles, with expenses paid by the Los Angeles Chamber of Commerce.

The following year, Carroll joined a group of film stars on the Hollywood Victory Caravan, which toured the United States and raised $800,000 for Army and Navy relief funds. After the caravan ended, she continued to perform with Bob Hope in shows at military bases in California.

In 1944, Carroll was featured as a beauty contest winner in the film Atlantic City.

== Personal life ==
Carroll married artist Bill Lignante, and the couple visited California military hospitals, where he sketched wounded servicemen. She had previously been married to writer George Giroux. Carroll died on May 3, 2019, at the age of 95.
