= List of feature film series with eight entries =

This is a list of film series that have eight entries.

Key:

- (A) – Film series is 100% animated
- (a) – Film series is not 100% animated and has live action in a sequel or prequel
- (TV) – made-for-TV
- (V) – direct-to-video
- (*) – TV series attached

== 0-9 ==
- 91:an Karlsson
  1. 91:an Karlsson. "Hela Sveriges lilla beväringsman" (1946)
  2. 91:an Karlssons permis (1947)
  3. 91 Karlssons bravader (1951)
  4. Alla tiders 91 Karlsson (1953)
  5. 91 Karlsson rycker in (1955)
  6. 91:an Karlsson slår knock out (1957)
  7. 91:an Karlsson muckar (tror han) (1959)
  8. 91:an och generalernas fnatt (1977)

== B ==
- Beethoven *
  1. Beethoven (1992)
  2. Beethoven's 2nd (1993)
  3. Beethoven's 3rd (2000) (V)
  4. Beethoven's 4th (2001) (V)
  5. Beethoven's 5th (2003) (V)
  6. Beethoven's Big Break (2008) (V) (reboot)
  7. Beethoven's Christmas Adventure (2011) (V) (reboot)
  8. Beethoven's Treasure Tail (2014) (V) (reboot)
- Boundary of Emptiness (A)
  1. The Garden of Sinners: Overlooking View (2008)
  2. The Garden of Sinners: A Study in Murder – Part 1 (2008)
  3. The Garden of Sinners: Remaining Sense of Pain (2008)
  4. The Garden of Sinners: The Hollow Shrine (2008)
  5. The Garden of Sinners: Paradox Spiral (2009)
  6. The Garden of Sinners: Oblivion Recording (2009)
  7. The Garden of Sinners: A Study in Murder – Part 2 (2009)
  8. The Garden of Sinners: Future Gospel (2013)

== C ==
- Captain America (a)
  1. Captain America (1979) (TV)
  2. Captain America II: Death Too Soon (1979) (TV)
  3. Captain America (1990) (V)
  4. Captain America: The First Avenger (2011)
  5. Captain America: The Winter Soldier (2014)
  6. Iron Man and Captain America: Heroes United (2014) (А) (V)
  7. Captain America: Civil War (2016)
  8. Captain America: Brave New World (2025)
- Child's Play *
  1. Child's Play (1988)
  2. Child's Play 2 (1990)
  3. Child's Play 3 (1991)
  4. Bride of Chucky (1998)
  5. Seed of Chucky (2004)
  6. Curse of Chucky (2013) (V)
  7. Cult of Chucky (2017) (V)
  8. Child's Play (2019) (reboot)
- Carl Hamilton *
  1. Codename Coq Rouge (1989)
  2. Förhöret (1989) (TV)
  3. Den demokratiske terroristen (1992)
  4. Vendetta (1995)
  5. Tribunal (1995) (TV)
  6. Hamilton (1998)
  7. Hamilton: In the Interest of the Nation (2012)
  8. Agent Hamilton: But Not If It Concerns Your Daughter (2012)
- El Charro Negro
  1. El Charro Negro (1940)
  2. La vuelta del Charro Negro (1941)
  3. La venganza del Charro Negro (1941)
  4. El Charro Negro en el norte (1949)
  5. El hijo del Charro Negro (1961)
  6. Muerte en la feria (1962)
  7. El charro Negro contra la banda de los cuervos (1963)
  8. La máscara de jade (1963)
- Cheyenne Davis
  1. Law of the Lash (1947)
  2. Border Feud (1947)
  3. Pioneer Justice (1947)
  4. Ghost Town Renegades (1947)
  5. Stage to Mesa City (1947)
  6. Return of the Lash (1947)
  7. The Fighting Vigilantes (1947)
  8. Cheyenne Takes Over (1947)

*Unrelated to the first sequel in the series.

== D ==
- Diary of a Wimpy Kid (a)
1. Diary of a Wimpy Kid (2010)
2. Diary of a Wimpy Kid: Rodrick Rules (2011)
3. Diary of a Wimpy Kid: Dog Days (2012)
4. Diary of a Wimpy Kid: The Long Haul (2017)
5. Diary of a Wimpy Kid (2021) (A)
6. Diary of a Wimpy Kid: Rodrick Rules (2022) (A)
7. Diary of a Wimpy Kid Christmas: Cabin Fever (2023) (A)
8. Diary of a Wimpy Kid: The Last Straw (2025) (A)
- Dik Trom
  1. Uit het leven van Dik Trom (1941)
  2. Dik Trom en zijn dorpsgenoten (1947)
  3. De Nieuwe Avonturen van Dik Trom (1958)
  4. Dik Trom en het circus (1960)
  5. Dik Trom en zijn dorpsgenoten (1973)
  6. Dik Trom knapt het op (1974)
  7. Dik Trom weet raad (1976)
  8. Dik Trom (2010)
- Drift
  1. Drift (2006)
  2. Drift 2 (2006)
  3. Drift 3 Taka (2006)
  4. Drift 4 Hayabusa (2007)
  5. Drift Special - Beauty Battle (2007)
  6. Drift 5 (2007)
  7. Drift 6 Z (2008) (a.k.a. Drift z)
  8. Drift 7 R (2008) (a.k.a. Drift GT-R)
- "Dodo" Doubleday
  1. Tanks a Million (1941)
  2. Hay Foot (1942)
  3. About Face (1942)
  4. Fall In (1942)
  5. Yanks Ahoy (1943)
  6. Here Comes Trouble (1948)
  7. As You Were (1951)
  8. Mr. Walkie Talkie (1952)

== F ==
- Frankenstein (Universal film series)
  1. Frankenstein (1931)
  2. Bride of Frankenstein (1935)
  3. Son of Frankenstein (1939)
  4. The Ghost of Frankenstein (1942)
  5. Frankenstein Meets the Wolf Man (1943)
  6. House of Frankenstein (1944)
  7. House of Dracula (1945)
  8. Abbott and Costello Meet Frankenstein (1948)
- Faces of Death *
  1. Faces of Death (1979)
  2. Faces of Death II (1981)
  3. Faces of Death III (1985)
  4. The Worst of Faces of Death (1987)
  5. Faces of Death IV (1990)
  6. Faces of Death V (1995)
  7. Faces of Death VI (1996)
  8. Faces of Death: Fact or Fiction? (1999)
- The Fairly OddParents *
  1. The Fairly OddParents: Abra-Catastrophe! (2003) (TV)
  2. The Fairly OddParents: Channel Chasers (2004) (TV)
  3. The Fairly OddParents: School's Out! The Musical (2004) (TV)
  4. The Fairly OddParents: Fairy Idol (2006) (TV)
  5. Fairly OddBaby (2008) (TV)
  6. The Fairly OddParents Wishology: The Big Beginning (2009) (TV)
  7. The Fairly OddParents Wishology: The Exciting Middle Part (2009) (TV)
  8. The Fairly OddParents Wishology: The Final Ending (2009) (TV)

== H ==
- The Howling
  1. The Howling (1981)
  2. Howling II: Your Sister Is a Werewolf (1985)
  3. Howling III (1987)
  4. Howling IV: The Original Nightmare (1988) (V)
  5. Howling V: The Rebirth (1989) (V)
  6. Howling VI: The Freaks (1991) (V)
  7. Howling: New Moon Rising (1995) (V)
  8. The Howling: Reborn (2011) (V) (reboot)
- Happy Little Submarine *
  1. Happy Little Submarines (2008)
  2. Happy Little Submarines 2 (2012)
  3. Happy Little Submarine 3: Rainbow Treasure (2013)
  4. Happy Little Submarines 4: Adventure of Octopus (2014)
  5. Happy Little Submarine: Magic Box of Time (2015)
  6. Happy Little Submarine: 20000 Leagues under the Sea (2018)
  7. Happy Little Submarine: Space Pals (2019)
  8. Happy Little Submarine: Journey to the Center of the Deep Ocean (2021)
- Hercule Poirot (1974 series)
  1. Murder on the Orient Express (1974)
  2. Death on the Nile (1978)
  3. The Mirror Crack'd (1980) (Miss Marple spin-off)
  4. Evil Under the Sun (1982)
  5. Thirteen at Dinner (1985) (TV)
  6. Dead Man's Folly (1986) (TV)
  7. Murder in Three Acts (1986) (TV)
  8. Appointment with Death (1988)
- Histoire(s) du cinéma
  1. Toutes les histoires (All the (Hi)stories) (1988)
  2. Une Histoire seule (A Single (Hi)story) (1989)
  3. Seul le cinéma (Only Cinema) (1997)
  4. Fatale beauté (Deadly Beauty) (1997)
  5. La Monnaie de l'absolu (The Coin of the Absolute) (1998)
  6. Une Vague Nouvelle (A New Wave) (1998)
  7. Le Contrôle de l'univers (The Control of the Universe) (1998)
  8. Les Signes parmi nous (The Signs Among Us) (1998)
- Huracán Ramírez
  1. Huracán Ramírez (1952)
  2. El misterio de Huracán Ramírez (1962)
  3. El Hijo de Huracán Ramírez (1966)
  4. La Venganza de Huracán Ramírez (1967)
  5. Huracán Ramírez y la Monjita Negra (1973)
  6. De Sangre Chicana (1974)
  7. El Torito Puños de Oro (1979)
  8. Hurricane Ramirez Vs. the Terrorists (1989)

== J ==
- Jerry Cotton
  1. Manhattan Night of Murder (1965)
  2. Tread Softly (1965)
  3. Die Rechnung – eiskalt serviert (1966)
  4. The Trap Snaps Shut at Midnight (1966)
  5. Murderers Club of Brooklyn (1967)
  6. Death in the Red Jaguar (1968)
  7. Death and Diamonds (1968)
  8. Dead Body on Broadway (1969)
- Jönssonligan
  1. Varning för Jönssonligan (1981)
  2. Jönssonligan och Dynamit-Harry (1982)
  3. Jönssonligan får guldfeber (1984)
  4. Jönssonligan dyker upp igen (1986)
  5. Jönssonligan på Mallorca (1989)
  6. Jönssonligan och den svarta diamanten (1992)
  7. Jönssonligans största kupp (1994)
  8. Jönssonligan spelar högt (2000)

== K ==
- Khiladi
  1. Khiladi (1992)
  2. Main Khiladi Tu Anari (1994)
  3. Sabse Bada Khiladi (1995)
  4. Khiladiyon Ka Khiladi (1996)
  5. Mr. and Mrs. Khiladi (1997)
  6. International Khiladi (1999)
  7. Khiladi 420 (2000)
  8. Khiladi 786 (2012)
- Kinnikuman ** (A)
  1. Showdown! The 7 Justice Supermen vs. The Space Samurais (1984) (TV)
  2. Kinnikuman: Stolen Championship Belt (1984)
  3. Great Riot! Justice Superman (1984)
  4. Justice Supermen vs. Ancient Supermen (1985)
  5. Hour of Triumph! Justice Superman(1985)
  6. Crisis in New York! (1986)
  7. Justice Supermen vs. Fighter Supermen (1986)
  8. Muscle Ginseng Competition! The Great Choujin War (2002)
- Kojak **
  1. The Marcus-Nelson Murders (1973) (TV)
  2. Kojak: The Belarus File (1985) (TV)
  3. Kojak: The Price of Justice (1987) (TV)
  4. Kojak: Ariana (1989) (TV)
  5. Kojak: Fatal Flaw (1989) (TV)
  6. Kojak: Flowers for Matty (1990) (TV)
  7. Kojak: It's Always Something (1990) (TV)
  8. Kojak: None So Blind (1990) (TV)

== L ==
- Leprechaun
  1. Leprechaun (1993)
  2. Leprechaun 2 (1994)
  3. Leprechaun 3 (1995) (V)
  4. Leprechaun 4: In Space (1997) (V)
  5. Leprechaun in the Hood (2000) (V)
  6. Leprechaun: Back 2 tha Hood (2003) (V)
  7. Leprechaun: Origins (2014) (V) (reboot)
  8. Leprechaun Returns (2018) (TV) (retcon)
- Lemmy Caution
  1. La môme vert-de-gris (1953)
  2. Cet homme est dangereux (1953)
  3. Les femmes s'en balancent (1954)
  4. Vous pigez ? (1955)
  5. Comment qu'elle est (1960)
  6. Lemmy pour les dames (1962)
  7. À toi de faire... mignonne (1963)
  8. Alphaville (1965)

== M ==
- Mission: Impossible *
  1. Mission: Impossible (1996)
  2. Mission: Impossible 2 (2000)
  3. Mission: Impossible III (2006)
  4. Mission: Impossible – Ghost Protocol (2011)
  5. Mission: Impossible – Rogue Nation (2015)
  6. Mission: Impossible – Fallout (2018)
  7. Mission: Impossible – Dead Reckoning Part One (2023)
  8. Mission: Impossible – The Final Reckoning (2025)
- Marvel Animated Features (A)
  1. Ultimate Avengers: The Movie (2006) (V)
  2. Ultimate Avengers 2: Rise of the Panther (2006) (V)
  3. The Invincible Iron Man (2007) (V)
  4. Doctor Strange: The Sorcerer Supreme (2007) (V)
  5. Next Avengers: Heroes of Tomorrow (2008) (V)
  6. Hulk vs. (2009) (V)
  7. Planet Hulk (2010) (V)
  8. Thor: Tales of Asgard (2011) (V)
- Mexican Spitfire
  1. The Girl from Mexico (1939)
  2. Mexican Spitfire (1940)
  3. Mexican Spitfire Out West (1940)
  4. Mexican Spitfire's Baby (1941)
  5. Mexican Spitfire at Sea (1942)
  6. Mexican Spitfire Sees a Ghost (1942)
  7. Mexican Spitfire's Elephant (1942)
  8. Mexican Spitfire's Blessed Event (1943)
- La Momia Azteca
  1. The Aztec Mummy (1957)
  2. The Curse of the Aztec Mummy (1957)
  3. The Robot vs. The Aztec Mummy (1957)
  4. Rock n' Roll Wrestling Women vs. the Aztec Ape (1964)
  5. Wrestling Women vs. the Aztec Mummy (1964)
  6. She-Wolves of the Ring (1965)
  7. The Panther Women (1967)
  8. Wrestling Women vs. The Robot (1969)
- My Little Pony ** (A)
  1. My Little Pony: The Movie (1986)
  2. My Little Pony: A Charming Birthday (2003) (V)
  3. My Little Pony: Dancing in the Clouds (2004) (V)
  4. My Little Pony: A Very Minty Christmas (2005) (V)
  5. My Little Pony: The Princess Promenade (2006) (V)
  6. My Little Pony: The Runaway Rainbow (2006) (V)
  7. My Little Pony: A Very Pony Place (2007) (V)
  8. My Little Pony: Pinkie Pie's Special Day (2008) (V)
- Mano Po
  1. Mano Po (2002)
  2. Mano Po 2: My Home (2003)
  3. Mano Po III: My Love (2004)
  4. Mano Po 4: Ako Legal Wife (2005)
  5. Mano Po 5: Gua Ai Di (2006)
  6. Mano Po 6: A Mother's Love (2007)
  7. Bahay Kubo: A Pinoy Mano Po! (2007) (spin-off)
  8. Mano Po 7: Chinoy (2017)

== N ==
- The Naked Brothers Band *
  1. The Naked Brothers Band: The Movie (2005) (TV)
  2. The Naked Brothers Band: Battle of the Bands (2007) (TV)
  3. The Naked Brothers Band: Sidekicks (2008) (TV)
  4. The Naked Brothers Band: Polar Bears (2008) (TV)
  5. The Naked Brothers Band: Mystery Girl (2008) (TV)
  6. The Naked Brothers Band: Operation Mojo (2008) (TV)
  7. The Naked Brothers Band: Naked Idol (2009) (TV)
  8. The Naked Brothers Band: The Premiere (2009) (TV)

== P ==
- Paranormal Activity
  1. Paranormal Activity (2007)
  2. Paranormal Activity 2 (2010) (prequel)
  3. Paranormal Activity 3 (2011) (prequel)
  4. Paranormal Activity 4 (2012)
  5. Paranormal Activity: The Marked Ones (2014) (spin-off)
  6. Paranormal Activity: The Ghost Dimension (2015)
  7. Paranormal Activity: Next of Kin (2021) (reboot)
  8. Paranormal Activity (2027)
- Parker Family Saga
  1. The Phantom of the Open Hearth (1976) (TV)
  2. The Great American Fourth of July and Other Disasters (1982) (TV)
  3. A Christmas Story (1983)
  4. The Star-Crossed Romance of Josephine Cosnowski (1985) (TV)
  5. Ollie Hopnoodle's Haven of Bliss (1988) (TV)
  6. My Summer Story (1994)
  7. A Christmas Story 2 (2012) (V)
  8. A Christmas Story Christmas (2022)
- Philip Marlowe **
  1. Murder, My Sweet (1944)
  2. The Big Sleep (1946)
  3. Lady in the Lake (1947)
  4. The Brasher Doubloon (1947)
  5. Marlowe (1969)
  6. The Long Goodbye (1973)
  7. Farewell My Lovely (1975)
  8. The Big Sleep (1978)

== R ==
- Renfrew of the Royal Mounted *
  1. Renfrew of the Royal Mounted (1937)
  2. On the Great White Trail (1938)
  3. Fighting Mad (1939)
  4. Crashing Thru (1939)
  5. Yukon Flight (1940)
  6. Murder on the Yukon (1940)
  7. Danger Ahead (1940)
  8. Sky Bandits (1940)
- Robot Taekwon V
  1. Robot Taekwon V (1976)
  2. Robot Taekwon V: Space Mission (1976)
  3. Robot Taekwon V: Underwater Rangers (1977)
  4. Robot Taekwon V vs. Golden Wings Showdown (1978)
  5. Fly! Spaceship Geobukseon (1979)
  6. Super Taekwon V (1982)
  7. '84 Taekwon V (1984)
  8. Robot Taekwon V 90 (1990)
- Roger Corman's Edgar Allan Poe films
  1. House of Usher (1960)
  2. The Pit and the Pendulum (1961)
  3. The Premature Burial (1962)
  4. Tales of Terror (1962)
  5. The Raven (1963)
  6. The Haunted Palace (1963)
  7. The Masque of the Red Death (1964)
  8. The Tomb of Ligeia (1965)
- Rusty
  1. The Adventures of Rusty (1945)
  2. The Return of Rusty (1946)
  3. For the Love of Rusty (1947)
  4. The Son of Rusty (1947)
  5. My Dog Rusty (1948)
  6. Rusty Leads the Way (1948)
  7. Rusty Saves a Life (1949)
  8. Rusty's Birthday (1949)

== S ==
- Sengekanten
  1. Mazurka på sengekanten (1970)
  2. Tandlæge på sengekanten (1971)
  3. Rektor på sengekanten (1972)
  4. Motorvej på sengekanten (1972)
  5. Romantik på sengekanten (1973)
  6. Der må være en sengekant (1975)
  7. Hopla på sengekanten (1976)
  8. Sømænd på sengekanten (1976)
- Sjors & Sjimmie
  1. Sjors van de Rebellenclub met vacantie (1940)
  2. Sjors van de Rebellenclub (1955)
  3. Sjors en Sjimmie op het Pirateneiland (1962)
  4. Sjors en Sjimmie en de Gorilla (1966)
  5. Sjors en Sjimmie in het Land der Reuzen (1968)
  6. Sjors en Sjimmie en de Toverring (1971)
  7. Sjors en Sjimmie en de Rebellen (1972)
  8. Sjors en Sjimmie en het Zwaard van Krijn (1977)

== T ==
- Tarzan (1918 series)
  1. Tarzan of the Apes (1918)
  2. The Romance of Tarzan (1918)
  3. The Revenge of Tarzan (1920)
  4. The Son of Tarzan (1920)
  5. The Adventures of Tarzan (1921)
  6. Tarzan and the Golden Lion (1927)
  7. Tarzan the Mighty (1928)
  8. Tarzan the Tiger (1929)
- The Trail Blazers (Ken Maynard and Hoot Gibson)
  1. Wild Horse Stampede (1943)
  2. The Law Rides Again (1943)
  3. Blazing Guns (1943)
  4. Death Valley Rangers (1943)
  5. Westward Bound (1944)
  6. Arizona Whirlwind (1944)
  7. Outlaw Trail (1944)
  8. Sonora Stagecoach (1944)
- Walt Disney's True-Life Adventures
  1. The Living Desert (1953)
  2. The Vanishing Prairie (1954)
  3. The African Lion (1955)
  4. Secrets of Life (1956)
  5. Perri (1957)
  6. White Wilderness (1958)
  7. Jungle Cat (1960)
  8. The Best of Walt Disney's True-Life Adventures (1975) (compilation)
- Turist Ömer (Ömer the Tourist)
  1. Turist Ömer (Ömer the Tourist) (1964)
  2. Aysecik - Cimcime Hanim (Aysecik: Naughty Lady) (1964)
  3. Turist Ömer dümenciler krali (1965)
  4. Turist Ömer Almanya'da (Ömer the Tourist in Germany) (1966)
  5. Turist Ömer Arabistan'da (1969)
  6. Turist Ömer Yamyamlar Arasinda (1970)
  7. Turist Ömer Boga Güresçisi (1971)
  8. Turist Ömer Uzay Yolunda (Ömer the Tourist in Star Trek) (1973)

== U ==
- Ureme
  1. Thunder Hawk from Beyond (1986)
  2. Wuroemae from the Outside, Part II (1986)
  3. Operation of Alien Uremae (1987)
  4. Wuroemae 4: Thunder V Operation (1987)
  5. New Machine Uremae 5 (1988)
  6. The Third Generation Uremae 6 (1989)
  7. Ureme 7: The Return of Ureme (1992)
  8. Ureme 8: Esperman and Ureme 8 (1993)

== W ==
- The Waltons *
  1. The Homecoming: A Christmas Story (1971) (TV)
  2. The Waltons: A Decade of the Waltons (1980 (TV)
  3. A Wedding on Walton's Mountain (1982) (TV)
  4. Mother's Day on Walton's Mountain (1982) (TV)
  5. A Day for Thanks on Walton's Mountain (1982) (TV)
  6. A Walton Thanksgiving Reunion (1993) (TV)
  7. A Walton Wedding (1995) (TV)
  8. A Walton Easter (1997) (TV)
- The Whistler
  1. The Whistler (1944)
  2. The Mark of the Whistler (1944)
  3. The Power of the Whistler (1945)
  4. Voice of the Whistler (1945)
  5. Mysterious Intruder (1946)
  6. The Secret of the Whistler (1946)
  7. The Thirteenth Hour (1947)
  8. The Return of the Whistler (1948)
- Wild Bill Elliott
  1. Calling Wild Bill Elliott (1943)
  2. The Man from Thunder River (1943)
  3. Bordertown Gun Fighters (1943)
  4. Wagon Tracks West (1943)
  5. Overland Mail Robbery (1943)
  6. Death Valley Manhunt (1943)
  7. Mojave Firebrand (1944)
  8. Hidden Valley Outlaws (1944)

== Y ==
- Yolki
  1. Yolki (2010)
  2. Yolki 2 (2011)
  3. Yolki 3 (2013)
  4. Yolki 1914 (2014)
  5. Paws, Bones & Rock'n'roll (2015)
  6. Yolki 5 (2016)
  7. Yolki 6 (2017)
  8. Yolki 7 (2018)

== Z ==
- Zorro (1958-1962) (Note: A series where the titular character is portrayed by Luis Aguilar.)
  1. El Zorro escarlata en la venganza del ahorcado (1958)
  2. El regreso del monstruo (1959)
  3. El Zorro escarlata en diligencia fantasma (1959)
  4. El correo del norte (1960)
  5. La máscara de la muerte (1961)
  6. La trampa mortal (1962)
  7. La venganza de la Sombra (1962)
  8. El Zorro Vengador (1962)
