= On the Great White Trail =

1938 film

- Theatrical release poster
- Directed by: Albert Herman
- Written by: Laurie York Erskine (story); Charles Logue (screenplay); Joseph F. Poland (screenplay)
- Produced by: Albert Herman (producer)
- Starring: See below
- Cinematography: Ira H. Morgan
- Edited by: Duke Goldstone
- Production company: Criterion Pictures
- Distributed by: Grand National Pictures
- Release date: July 22, 1938
- Running time: 58 minutes
- Country: United States
- Language: English

On the Great White Trail also known as Renfrew on the Great White Trail is a 1938 American Northern starring James Newill as Sgt. Renfrew of the Royal Mounted in the second of the film series. It was produced and directed by Albert Herman.

== Plot ==
Even in the remote fur trading section of Canada, Sergeant Douglas Renfrew finds a lady in distress. Kay Larkin, whose father is a suspect to a crime. Larkin's partner, along with another Mountie, are found murdered: word came down from the remote region of the Pacific Northwest from Dr. Howe, who resides there. But after finding old man Larkin, and arresting him in the name of the Crown, Renfrew hears his story and suspect's Kay's father is innocent of the charges. Pierre, an employee of a trading post up north, is suspect until Dr. Howe's guilt is revealed. Howe committed the murders and attempted to frame Larkin. The motive was theft and greed that resulted in a murder neither party wanted to be involved, then attempted to cover their tracks.

== Cast ==
- James Newill as Sgt. Renfrew
- Terry Walker as Kay Larkin
- Robert Frazer as Andrew Larkin
- Richard Alexander as Doc Howe
- Richard Tucker as Inspector Newcom
- Bob Terry as Sergeant Kelly
- Eddie Gribbon as RCMP Constable Patsy
- Walter McGrail as Garou
- Philo McCullough as Henchman Williams
- Charles King as Henchman LaGrange
- Juan Duval as Henchman Pierre
- Victor Potel as Lyons
- Silver King the Dog as King, Renfrew's Dog

== Production ==
Replacing Lighting, the police dog from the first Renfrew movie, was another German Shepherd, Silver King, whose screen presence lasted a mere half a dozen movies. Director Al Herman was contracted to direct two Renfrew movies. Because the studio, Grand National Pictures, filed bankruptcy, Criterion acquired the former contract and Herman fulfilled his obligation before departing the poverty row studio for another low-budget entity, Monogram. Herman would go on to direct a number of Tex Ritter westerns.

== Soundtrack ==
- James Newill - "Mounted Men" (Written by Betty Laidlaw and Robert Lively)
- James Newill - "You're Beautiful" (Written by Lew Porter)
- James Newill - "Je T'aime" (Written by Lew Porter and Bob Taylor)

== See also ==
- Renfrew of the Royal Mounted (1937)
- Sky Bandits (1940)
- Danger Ahead (1940)
- Yukon Flight (1940)
