= Yukon Flight =

1940 film by Ralph Staub

- Film poster
- Directed by: Ralph Staub
- Written by: Edward Halperin (screenplay)
- Based on: Renfrew Rides the Sky (novel) by Laurie York Erskine
- Produced by: Phil Goldstone
- Starring: James Newill; Louise Stanley; William Pawley
- Cinematography: Mack Stengler
- Edited by: Martin G. Cohn
- Music by: Betty Laidlaw; Robert Lively; Lew Porter; Johnny Lange
- Production company: Criterion Pictures Corp.
- Distributed by: Monogram Pictures
- Release date: January 2, 1940
- Running time: 57 minutes
- Country: United States
- Language: English

Yukon Flight (also known as Renfrew of the Royal Mounted in Yukon Flight) is a 1940 American Western film directed by Ralph Staub and starring James Newill, Louise Stanley, Dave O'Brien and William Pawley. Released by Monogram Pictures, the film uses a musical/action formula, similar to the format of the "singing cowboy" films of the era.

== Plot ==
When an aircraft from the Yukon and Columbia Mail Service crashes, Sergeant Renfrew (James Newill) and Constable Kelly (Dave O'Brien), of the Royal Canadian Mounted Police, suspect murder because they find the control stick jammed. Louise Howard (Louise Stanley), a mine owner reports that her superintendent is missing. When he is found murdered, it also is made to look like an accident.

The new mail service pilot, Bill Shipley (Warren Hull), had trained with Renfrew, is a good pilot but reckless. The Mounties find Louise's assistant Raymond (Karl Hackett) owns the airline managed by "Yuke Cardoe" (William Pawley) and both men had been stealing gold from the mine. They have been shipping it to Seattle by aircraft. When Renfrew sets a trap, Yuke and Raymond panic and try to escape in their aircraft, but Renfrew and Shipley bring them down, after which, Renfrew makes a recommendation for Shipley to join the Royal Canadian Mounted Police as a new pilot.

== Cast ==
- James Newill as Sgt. Renfrew
- Louise Stanley as Louise Howard
- Warren Hull as Bill Shipley
- William Pawley as "Yuke" Gradeau
- George Humbert as Nick
- Karl Hackett as Raymond
- Jack Clifford as "Whispering Smith"
- Roy Barcroft as Lodin
- Bob Terry as DeLong
- Earl Douglas as "Smokey" Joe

== Production ==
All of the Renfrew pictures were made miles from the sheltered enclosure of Hollywood sound stages. Cameras were set up where there was tall timber and deep blue mountain lakes and no stage-door guards. Shooting pictures under such conditions very often led to unusual situations. According to a press release (to be taken with a grain of salt), “In the making of the latest Renfrew picture, Yukon Flight, the Monogram troupe had to stop working on the picture for several days to help forest rangers put out a forest fire. Then a few days later, James Newill saved a little girl from drowning.”

Yukon Flight was the first of three Renfrew movies to be directed by Ralph Staub, whose credits included producing a lengthy on-going series of film shorts known as Screen Snapshots (1930–1958) and a number of Gene Autry westerns at Republic. Three of Staub’s Screen Snapshots were nominated for an Academy Award, and he remains the only director in the Renfrew film franchise to have a star on the Hollywood Walk of Fame.

Sergeant Renfrew of the Royal Mounted flew a Waco biplane in a fight with the criminals, filmed in the air. (Note: The aircraft in the film carry a NC-number, not Canadian registration.)

Sergeant Renfrew of the Royal Mounted was a character created by Laurie York Erskine in 1922 and continued in books, stories and on radio for many years. Yukon Flight was one of three films based on the Laurie York Erskine novel Renfrew Rides North. The others were Renfrew on the Great White Trail (1938) and Murder on the Yukon (1940). Some scenes were shot at Big Bear Lake, California, standing in for the Yukon. Renfrew's character flies a Waco RNF (N617Y) while other aircraft include a Waco RNF (NC860V) and a Travel Air 4000 (c/n 868, NC9087). A Curtiss Fledgling is used as a camera aircraft.

== Soundtrack ==
"Mounted Men" and "The Old Grey Goose" (written by Betty Laidlaw and Robert Lively) was sung by James Newill.

== Reception ==
Yukon Flight was not reviewed in trade sources. It was followed by Sky Bandits, another in the series of Renfrew of the Royal Mounted films.

== See also ==
- Renfrew of the Mounted (1937 film)
- On the Great White Trail (1938 film)
- Sky Bandits (1940 film)
