= Jack Clifford (actor) =

American actor (1888–1974)

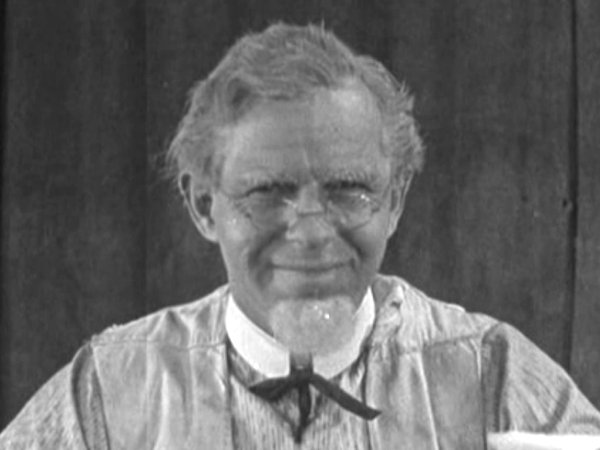
- Image of Clifford from the film 45 Minutes from Hollywood (1926)
- Born: John Clifford Cooley; December 25, 1888; Elmira, New York, U.S.
- Died: October 1974 (aged 85)
- Resting place: Rose Hills Memorial Park
- Occupations: Film and stage actor
- Spouse(s): Miriam Wills (née Moore) (1915 – 1921); May Louise Ludwig (c. 1925 – 1930 or 1931); Virginia May Meldrum (1931 – 1974)
- Children: 3

Jack Clifford (né John Clifford Cooley; December 25, 1888 – October 1974), also known as Jack "Rube" Clifford, was an American character actor and singer in vaudeville, theater, film, and radio, who became known for portraying rustic, unsophisticated characters (as were sometimes labeled rubes, hence the later-adopted stage name), whose radio work—or, more specifically, whose vaudeville character "The Sheriff" (originated onstage in the 1920's and subsequently popularized on radio)—has, in the 21st century, come to be regarded by at least some radio historians as the original inspiration for Robert McKimson's and Mel Blanc's anthropomorphic cartoon rooster, Foghorn Leghorn.

== Early life and career ==
Born in Elmira, New York, Clifford spent his formative years in Atlanta, Georgia. He later attended the University of Washington and eventually settled in San Jose, California.

Of the rustic character portraits at which he excelled, perhaps the most acclaimed was his portrayal of the character, Anderson Crow, created by novelist George Barr McCutcheon. Reviewing Clifford's performance on April 16, 1923 at the Palace Theatre in New York, Billboard deemed it "as fine a characterization of an old rube detective as may be boasted of either on the vaudeville or the legitimate stage.

It would seem as if Anderson Crow, in the book of that name [...], had actually stepped from the pages of the author. Clifford is an artist de lux and knows how to plant his laughs and to time them with an uncanny sense of audience psychology. His vocal imitations, the banjo, steel guitar and the phonograph, registered exceedingly well. [...] The act stopped the show absolutely and Clifford was forced to respond with a speech of thanks. Perhaps the best act Clifford has ever presented in vaudeville and a characterization that will long remain as a classic."

Long before this, however (and before making "Rube" part of his stage name), Clifford had teamed with his first wife, Miriam Wills, between 1916 and 1921, in an act billed simply as Clifford and Wills, best known for the original skit, "At Jasper Junction."

The fact that there was another, already well established vaudeville artist named Jack Clifford—namely, the dance partner and soon-to-be husband of Evelyn Nesbit—was not lost on the press. In particular, the presence of both Clifford-Nesbit and Clifford-Wills on the same bill at San Francisco's Orpheum Theatre in June 1917 was promptly noted by The San Francisco Examiner's Thomas Nunan, who jokingly proposed avoiding further confusion by referring to Miss Wills' partner as Jasper from that point forward. The following month, perhaps in response to this story, a mock do-over wedding of Clifford and Wills was conducted (or at least reported), wherein the other Clifford acted as best man, and Nesbit as matron of honor.

In the months following the couple's 1921 divorce, Clifford himself became a headliner in the Orpheum Circuit, with the newly unveiled stage name "Jack 'Rube' Clifford" serving to pre-empt any further confusion as to his identity.

The following year, Clifford landed a leading role in the musical comedy, Glory, written by the same playwright-lyricist-composer tandem responsible for the hit show, Irene, three years earlier. Of Clifford's performance as Hiram Dexter, the New York Times wrote:

Jack Clifford, as the town miser, furnished a considerable part of the comedy, and his 'repentance,' when he gives away some of his wealth in the final scene, was a very pretty piece of very quiet comedy, unusual in this kind of play.

Responding to that same performance, and to a perceived over-valuation of the then visiting Moscow Art Theatre at the expense of American stage actors deserving of equal or greater acclaim, Percy Hammond of the New York Tribune compiled a "baker's dozen" of such actors, including "[David] Warfield and Clifford, [plus] such artists as Miss Helen Menken, Miss Ruth Draper, Miss Haidee Wright, José Ruben, Laurence Hanray and Felix Aylmer."

In December 1923, reviewing his latest vaudeville routine, "Camera Eye Carter," at the Orpheum in Champaign, Illinois, Daily Illini critic Rudolph Kagey ranked Clifford, "without doubt, as one of the best solo comedians that has appeared on the Orph stage this year."

For much of 1925, Clifford's sketch, alternately titled "The Idle Hour" and "Moving Picture Shows Twenty Years Ago," a well-received parodic recreation of cinema's early days, was presented as part of Fanchon and Marco's latest "Idea" (as the sister-and-brother team referred to each of its revues).

Returning to the legitimate stage in 1926, Clifford appeared in Garrett Chatfield Pier's The Jeweled Tree, a lavishly produced but poorly received period piece that closed after 37 performances. The following year, helping comprise a company deemed by Daily News critic Burns Mantle "as perfect as casts can be," Clifford appeared in Bartlett Cormack's much more successful The Racket, alongside, most notably, a young Edward G. Robinson (whose performance helped launch his screen career), as well as actor-directors John Cromwell and Norman Foster.

== Film ==
Portraying the father of protagonist Glenn Tryon in the 1926 two-reel comedy Long Pants, Clifford's "great work" is cited by Moving Picture World reviewer Sumner Smith, who writes, "Glenn's film father also gets into the limelight by falling for the girl himself. Crippled by rheumatism, he does quite a lot of low and lofty tumbling." The Clifford/Tryon onscreen pairing/rivalry was reprised—with Clifford now cast as Tryon's "Grandpa"—in the 1926 two-reeler 45 Minutes from Hollywood, a film now best known as one of the rare instances of Stan Laurel and Oliver Hardy appearing in the same film—albeit independently—prior to the team's official debut in 1927.

In July 1925, both Motion Picture News and Moving Picture World reported that Clifford had been assigned "[a]n important role" in The Winner (as was titled the Charles Ray vehicle ultimately released as Sweet Adeline), in which Clifford portrays the protagonist's bullying older brother. He also has a significant role as the dog catcher in the 1931 Academy Award-nominated film Skippy, and plays the sheriff in the 1945 Three Stooges western farce, Rockin' in the Rockies. In addition, Clifford received fourth billing and a good deal of screen time in the 1936 John Wayne western, King of the Pecos, as the gunslinging "chief accomplice" of Wayne's cattle baron nemesis.

Regarding Clifford's performance in the 1931 western The Sunrise Trail, The Hollywood Reporter, in an otherwise lukewarm review, writes, "Jack Clifford, as Kansas, is very, very good. It's too bad that his part was not better written, for his acting deserved it." Variety, reviewing the action-packed 1937 oater, One Man Justice, wherein Clifford portrays one of a host of old friends and colleagues summoned by the film's protagonist in order to help "clear up the mess" in his crime-ridden hometown, states that "Clifford is easily the best of the cinematic constables with his dry, smooth delivery and believable performance."

== Radio ==
Clifford had recurring roles on KFWB's Hi-Jinks, and on KNX (AM)'s The Gilmore Circus.

=== Foghorn Leghorn ===
More than one author has suggested that Clifford's "sheriff"–as heard on radio and/or witnessed in vaudeville reviews–served at least in part as the original inspiration for Warner Brothers' cartoon protagonist, Foghorn Leghorn. Voice actor Mel Blanc, speaking with radio historian Ben Ohmart, recalled:

"When I created Foghorn, I remembered something that had happened as a kid. I saw a vaudeville act [or The Gilmore Circus] with a deaf sheriff who would say, 'Pay attenshun, I'm talkin' to you, boy.' So I stored that in my head, and when Foghorn came along, I used that style."

== Return to the stage ==
In April 1950, near the end of his prolific but low-profile onscreen career, Clifford—assisted by his then wife, Virginia Meldrum—made a bid to recapture his stage success, performing at the Orpheum in Los Angeles. The new act netted at least one new fan in L.A. Mirror theater critic Jim San Filippo:

Another artist on the bill is Jack Clifford, whose act grows more compelling with the minutes and, though it is antique and old vintage, there is a real ol' opry house charm. His characterization of a Bowery bum getting a lift from a shot of narcotics is an authentic and magical drawing from life's passing parade. He is ably assisted by Virginia Meldrum.

Elsewhere, reviews were mixed at best. Variety dismissed it altogether, as "another slow spot on the bill, failing to get over with either his railway junction sketch or his pantomime of a dope fiend."

On September 17, 1953, Clifford and several other veterans of vaudeville and silent film were featured on an episode of the weekly TV series, Before Your Eyes, broadcast on KTTV in Los Angeles.

== Personal life ==
Clifford was married at least four times; in all but one case (that being Clifford's second wife, Laura Denton of Sioux Falls, South Dakota), his spouse was also his then current onstage partner. The first marriage, to Miriam Wills (née Moore), began in 1915 and ended in divorce in 1921. His marriage to Laura Denton commenced in Mexico on March 21, 1921 and continued at least until September 1923. May Louise Ludwig was married to Clifford from roughly 1925 until their separation in either 1930 or '31, having borne one child, a daughter.

On July 31, 1931, Clifford was married to Virginia May Meldrum and appears to have remained so until his death in 1974. Although the couple did have a pair of twins, a boy and girl, as reported in Variety in July 1932, it appears that within less than a month, both children had died.

== Stage shows ==
=== Vaudeville ===
- The Broadway Revue (1917), Majestic Theatre, Waco, Texas; in "At Jasper Junction"
- Elizabeth Brice's Overseas Revue (1919), Orpheum Theatre, Kansas City, Missouri; in "At Jasper Junction"
- At the Country Club (1924) Majestic Theatre, San Antonio, Texas
- Sciots Follies (1924), Reavis G and S Theatre, Santa Rosa, California; in "Camera Eyed Carter" [sic]
- High C's Revue (1927), Colonial Theatre, Allentown, Pennsylvania; with Mae Ludwig in "The Sheriff"
- All Aces Revue (1933). Warfield Theatre, San Francisco, California

=== Broadway ===
- Glory (1922), Vanderbilt Theatre, Manhattan, New York; as Hiram Dexter
- The Jeweled Tree (1926), 48th Street Theatre, Manhattan, New York; as Fourth Guard
- The Racket (1927), Ambassador Theatre, Manhattan, New York; as Clark
- Frankie and Johnnie (1930), Theatre Republic, Manhattan, New York; as Frank
- Orchids Preferred (1937), Imperial Theatre, Manhattan, New York; as Henry Warrenton

== Filmography ==
- The Squaw Man (1914)
- Long Pants (1926)
- Sweet Adeline (1926 film) (1926) as Bill Wilson
- 45 Minutes from Hollywood (1926)
- The Sunrise Trail (1931) as Kansas
- Skippy (film) (1931) as Mr. Nubbins, Dog-Catcher
- The Sin of Madelon Claudet (1931) as Head of orphan asylum, uncredited
- The Law of the Sea (1931) as First Mate, uncredited
- The Lost Special (serial) (1932) as Doran
- Tombstone Canyon (1932) as Newt
- One Track Minds (1933)
- The Poor Rich (1934) as Station Agent
- The Revenge Rider (1935) as Ludlow
- Gallant Defender (1935) as Sheriff Luther
- Pan Handlers (1936)
- King of the Pecos (1936) as Henchman Ash
- Timothy's Quest (1936 film) as Ed
- S.O.S. Coast Guard (1937) as carver, uncredited
- Racketeers in Exile (1937) as Thyrus
- High, Wide and Handsome (1937) as Wash Miller
- One Man Justice (1937) as Sheriff Ben Adams
- Carnival Queen (film) (1937) as Deputy Constable
- Wild West Days (1937) as Corey
- The Road to Reno as Trucker (1938)
- Yukon Flight as Whispering Smith (1940)
- Skt Bandits as Whispering Smith (1940)
- Beyond the Sacramento (1940) as Sheriff
- Ragtime Cowboy Joe (1940) as Clayton
- The Green Hornet Strikes Again! (1941) as homeowner thug, uncredited
- Arizona Cyclone (1941) as Johnson
- Confessions of Boston Blackie (1941)
- The Old Texas Trail (1944) as Sheriff Thomas
- The Great Alaskan Mystery (1944), as Agent Dunn who poses as a trapper, a serial
- Honeymoon Ahead (1945) as Gus
- Senorita from the West (1945) as Motor cop
- Unconquered (1947) as "frontiersman"
