= Keystone Hotel =

Keystone Hotel may refer to:

- Keystone Hotel (Castle Rock, Colorado), listed on the National Register of Historic Places in Douglas County, Colorado
- Keystone Hotel (Hummelstown, Pennsylvania), listed on the National Register of Historic Places in Dauphin County, Pennsylvania
- Keystone Hotel (Lampasas, Texas), Recorded Texas Historic Landmark
- Keystone Hotel (McCook, Nebraska), listed on the National Register of Historic Places in Red Willow County, Nebraska
- Keystone Hotel (film), a 1935 short film directed by Ralph Staub
