= The Empire Builders =

1924 film

Empire Builders
- Produced by: Phil Goldstone
- Starring: Snowy Baker; Margaret Landis
- Release date: 1924
- Running time: 49 minutes
- Country: United States
- Languages: Silent; English intertitles

The Empire Builders is a 1924 American silent film starring Snowy Baker, the second movie the Australian actor made in America. It was highly popular in Australia.

Prominent roles were taken by the horses Boomerang and Prince Charlie.

== Plot ==
The film is set in South Africa. Captain William Ballard of the Territorials is sent to make a treaty with the natives. He meets resistance from the Boers, still unreconciled to British rule. He falls in love with Katryn van der Poel. He succeeds in rescuing a lost party and recovering important military dispatches.

== Cast ==
- Snowy Baker as Captain William Ballard
- Margaret Landis as Katryn van der Poel
- Theodore Lorch as Hendrik van der Poel
- Pinckney Harrison as Karui the king
- J.P. Lockney as a trader
- Jere Austin as Fritz van Roon
