= Renfrew of the Royal Mounted =

Book series by Laurie York Erskine

Renfrew of the Royal Mounted was a popular series of boy's adventure books written by Laurie York Erskine that were later filmed and became a series on both radio and television.

== Canon ==
'Inspector Douglas Renfrew' was a former Royal Flying Corps officer who joined the Royal North-West Mounted Police, later the Royal Canadian Mounted Police. The fictional literary character was created in 1921 by Laurie York Erskine. While Canadian Mountie fiction existed prior to 1921, it was Erskine's creation that led to imitation and, for a few short years in the latter half of the 1930s, a rise in popularity with the form of adventure fiction. The short stories that appeared in magazines were recycled for use in a series of ten novels, a long-running radio program and a series of eight motion pictures. The cry known as the Renfrew call—which children all over America imitated heard daily on the radio program—echoed through city streets and alleys. Actor Ed Asner once recalled on the Merv Griffin television program how Renfrew of the Mounted was his favorite radio program.

- 1. Renfrew of the Royal Mounted (1922)
- 2. Renfrew Rides Again (1927)
- 3. Renfrew Rides the Sky (1928)
- 4. Comrades of the Clouds (1930)
- 5. Renfrew Rides North (1931)
- 6. Renfrew's Long Trail (1933)
- 7. Renfrew Rides the Range (1935)
- 8. Renfrew in the Valley of the Vanished Men (1936)
- 9. One Man Came Back (1939)
- 10. Renfrew Flies Again (1941)

With limited funding and the enthusiasm that young idealists possess, Laurie York Erskine, along with three good friends, founded the Solebury School for Boys in October 1925. The private boys school was financially established as a result of Erskine's sale of a magazine serial for $20,000, titled The Confidence Man. This inspired Erskine to write a number of adventure novels, in the hopes of making another sale to Hollywood, including The River Trail (1923), The Laughing Rider (1924), Valor of the Range (1925), The Coming of Cosgrove (1926), and Power of the Hills (1928). When it became clear that Hollywood sought no interest in Erskine's novels, the author agreed to provide the publishing house additional Renfrew novels. Historically, the only novels that sold well for D. Appleton & Company were those with Inspector Douglas Renfrew and a letter from the company assured him continued publication of Renfrew novels.

Erskine also wrote over 100 Renfrew short stories for The American Boy magazine, most of them recycled for use in the Renfrew novels listed above. Erskine wrote a total of ten Renfrew novels. The hero of The Laughing Rider was a Texas Ranger, William O'Brien Argent. The hero of The River Trail was a Canadian Mountie named William Goeffrain. Magazine articles and reference guides incorrectly claim these two novels among the Renfrew canon. The ten Renfrew novels listed above were written and published partly out of necessity. Erskine donated the profits from his handiwork to the funding of the private boys' school. Erskine doubled as teacher by day and author by night.

Six months after publication, Renfrew Rides the Sky (published September 1928) was included in the official library of the Imperial War Museum at South Kensington, England. Renfrew Rides North (published September 1931) was dedicated to seven of his students at Solebury School. Renfrew's Long Trail (published August 1933) was dedicated to the memory of Inspector Alfred Herbert Joy of the Royal Canadian Mounted Police, whose gallant personality and indomitable spirit was presented in the figure of Inspector Jocelyn in the novel.

== Radio ==
Laurie York Erskine made his radio debut as a narrator of fictional adventures for the weekly Macy's Boys Club over WOR in New Jersey, from 1930 to 1931. Four years later in 1935, Erskine was convinced by Douglas Storer, a literary agent, to adapt Renfrew of the Mounted for radio. Storer was the agent for Robert L. Ripley, Cab Calloway and Dale Carnegie and it was Storer who succeeded in convincing an ad agency, Batten, Burton, Durstine and Osborne to sell the program to the Continental Baking Company (selling loaves of bread). From March 3, 1936, to March 5, 1937, over CBS, Renfrew of the Mounted was broadcast five times a week in 15-minute installments. The radio scripts were written by Erskine, who continued to donate the income ($125 a week) to the funding of Solebury School. House Jameson played the title role of Inspector Douglas Renfrew. This series spawned a number of premiums including a red pin, a postcard, two campfire handbooks and a map so listeners could follow along with the adventures. The program was never renewed after 52 weeks because the sponsor, after an extensive study, revealed that almost 90 percent of the bread purchased was not from children but adult females. Continental was against the use of premiums in fear it cheapened their product image and the advertising agency insisted on giveaways because such gimmicks were used extensively to convince sponsors of the popularity of the programs.

Renfrew of the Mounted returned to the air on the evening of January 7, 1939, on NBC-Blue, as a weekly half-hour program. House Jameson reprised his role of Inspector Douglas Renfrew. Unlike the prior incarnation over CBS, the weekly rendition was self-contained stories not told in serial format. This rendition lasted 89 broadcasts, concluding on the evening of October 12, 1940.

The third and final radio incarnation was on Passport to Adventure, broadcast over NBC-Blue, five days a week in 15-minute installments. Unlike the first two renditions, Erskine now served as narrator and told brief stories of adventure ranging from American historical events to cowboys and Indians, much like a storyteller by the campfire. On average, once every two weeks Erskine would recount a story involving Inspector Douglas Renfrew of the Royal Canadian Mounted Police. This program aired from August 18, 1941, to March 27, 1942. The program would have continued beyond March 1942 if it was not for Laurie York Erskine being drafted.

In the film Broadway Limited, ZaSu Pitts' character insists on listening to Renfrew on the radio in the train's lounge car.

Having flown combat aerial during World War I, Erskine served his country again from 1942 to 1944, stationed in Hawaii to train young cadets in combat flying. When Erskine returned to the States following the war, he discovered that radio stations and networks had no further interest in Renfrew of the Mounted. If anything, there was only room for one Canadian Mountie program and George W. Trendle's Sergeant Preston of the Yukon program was by then widely syndicated. Erskine succeeded in auditioning Renfrew for radio multiple times but no sponsor agreed to foot the bill.

== Films ==
Prior to television, Hollywood was populated with poverty row pictures, slang used to refer to a variety of independent (and short-lived) movie studios. With the CBS radio serial heard daily, Grand National Studios, Inc., also known as Grand National Pictures, sought interest in a series of Renfrew of the Mounted movies. Hired to play the role was James Newill, who had recently been a weekly singer on the George Burns and Gracie Allen radio program. The first of what would become eight motion-pictures, was released theatrically in September 1937. Following completion of the first film, Grand National Pictures filed bankruptcy. Under reorganizing proceedings, the entire business entity was assigned to the Criterion Pictures Corporation, under ownership of Phil Goldstone. Under Criterion, a new contract was agreed and signed by Douglas Storer and Laurie York Erskine for a total of four movies, which would have totaled five when the contract was completed. The studio heads forgot about the four-movie limit and produced five. After an exchange of letters between Douglas Storer and Goldstone at Criterion, it was agreed that the company could continue to produce additional movies under the same financial arrangement. Following completion of the eight movies, Criterion sold their business entity to Monogram Studios, who later re-released some of the movies for additional box office revenue.

- Renfrew of the Royal Mounted (theatrical release: October 8, 1937)
- Renfrew on the Great White Trail (theatrical release: July 22, 1938)
- Crashing Thru (theatrical release: October 1, 1939)
- Fighting Mad (theatrical release: November 5, 1939)
- Yukon Flight (theatrical release: January 2, 1940)
- Danger Ahead (theatrical release: January 10, 1940)
- Murder on the Yukon (theatrical release: February 25, 1940)
- Sky Bandits (theatrical release: April 15, 1940)

== Television ==
Under a contract dated October 11, 1951, Max Alexander of M&A Productions edited the eight movies into 13 half-hour television pictures with James Newill hosted new openings and closings to bridge the scenes.

A television pilot starring Arthur Franz as Douglas Renfrew was televised on June 15, 1956 as part of the Schlitz Playhouse of Stars weekly anthology, but never picked up.

In January 1980, an agreement was made with Wrather Entertainment for the possibility of producing a made-for-TV movie to serve as a pilot for a weekly series. Two teleplays were drafted, one written by Burt Armus. Neither were produced.

== Parody ==
Harvey Kurtzman satirized this series as "Miltie of the Mounties" in the fifth issue of Mad.

Canadian comedian Dave Broadfoot featured a "Sergeant Renfrew" character on the Royal Canadian Air Farce radio series. Broadfoot's version of Renfrew delivered monologues about his adventures hunting down criminals — like all good Mounties he always got his man, but did so in an outlandishly slapstick manner which relied as much on the criminal's incompetence and stupidity as on Renfrew's police skills. Often, it was his dog "Cuddles" who was responsible for saving the day. Frequently, Sgt. Renfrew was knocked out cold at some point in the chase, giving rise to the character's signature catchphrase, "When I regained consciousness..."

Broadfoot also performed the character on stage several times at actual RCMP conventions and events. His popularity was such with the RCMP that his character was promoted to sergeant, then sergeant major. The honorary promotion to Sergeant, complete with all insignia, was given to Broadfoot personally by Commissioner Simmins of the RCMP.
