= The Poor Rich =

1934 film by Edward Sedgwick

- Directed by: Edward Sedgwick
- Screenplay by: Ebba Havez; Dale Van Every
- Produced by: Carl Laemmle, Jr.
- Starring: Edward Everett Horton; Edna May Oliver; Andy Devine; Leila Hyams; Grant Mitchell; Thelma Todd
- Cinematography: George Robinson
- Edited by: Robert Carlisle
- Production company: Universal Pictures
- Distributed by: Universal Pictures
- Release date: February 26, 1934
- Running time: 77 minutes
- Country: United States
- Language: English

The Poor Rich is a 1934 American pre-Code comedy film directed by Edward Sedgwick and written by Ebba Havez and Dale Van Every. The film stars Edward Everett Horton, Edna May Oliver, Andy Devine, Leila Hyams, Grant Mitchell and Thelma Todd. The film was released on February 26, 1934, by Universal Pictures.

== Plot ==
A once wealthy American dynasty, the Spottiswoods, envision their financial salvation in marrying into money via an upcoming visit from the British (and actually wealthy) Fetherstones. To play the part, the Spottiswoods must quickly rehabilitate their estate to have a veneer of class and enlist a cadre of quirky workers to act as their domestic servants. Hijinks ensue.

== Cast ==
- Edward Everett Horton as Albert Stuyvesant Spottiswood
- Edna May Oliver as Harriet Spottiswood
- Andy Devine as Andy
- Leila Hyams as Grace Hunter
- Grant Mitchell as Tom Hopkins
- Thelma Todd as Gwendolyn Fetherstone
- Una O'Connor as Lady Fetherstone
- E. E. Clive as Lord Fetherstone
- John Miljan as Prince Abdul Hamidshan
- Sidney Bracey as Arbuthnot
- Jack Rube Clifford as Station Agent
- Henry Armetta as Tony
- Ward Bond as Motor Cop
