= Sweet Adeline (1926 film) =

1926 film

- Directed by: Jerome Storm
- Written by: Charles E. Banks
- Based on: Sweet Adeline; 1903 song by Richard H. Gerrard and Henry W. Armstrong
- Starring: Charles Ray; Gertrude Olmstead
- Cinematography: Philip Tannura
- Production company: Chadwick Pictures
- Distributed by: Chadwick Pictures; Film Booking Offices of America (UK)
- Release date: January 14, 1926
- Running time: 70 min.
- Country: United States
- Language: Silent (English intertitles)

Sweet Adeline is a 1926 American silent comedy film directed by Jerome Storm and starring Charles Ray and Gertrude Olmstead.

== Plot ==
As described in a film magazine review, Ben Wilson is the household drudge, bullied by his older brother Bill, with his only consolation being the owner of a fine tenor voice. He falls in love with Adeline, newly arrived to their rural village. Bill ends up being his rival for her affection. Ben makes a local hit singing "Sweet Adeline," and Bill procures a chance for him to sing in a Chicago cabaret. At first he breaks down, but recovers and rallies himself and is warmly received. His dream of success comes true and he wins the affection of Adeline.

== Cast ==
- Charles Ray as Ben Wilson
- Gertrude Olmstead as Adeline
- Jack Rube Clifford as Bill Wilson
- J.P. Lockney as Pa Wilson
- Sabel Johnson as Fat Lady
- Gertrude Short as Cabaret Dancer
- Ida Lewis as Ma Wilson
- Lillian Leighton as Adeline's Ma

== Bibliography ==
- Munden, Kenneth White. The American Film Institute Catalog of Motion Pictures Produced in the United States, Part 1. University of California Press, 1997.
