= Keystone Hotel (film) =

- Directed by: Ralph Staub
- Written by: Joe Traub
- Distributed by: Warner Brothers
- Release date: September 21, 1935
- Running time: 15 minutes
- Country: United States
- Language: English

See also Keystone Hotel (disambiguation)

Keystone Hotel is a 1935 two-reel comedy short subject, directed by Ralph Staub and released by the Vitaphone Corporation through Warner Bros. Pictures. Inspired by the silent comedies produced by Mack Sennett, the film reunites many of Sennett's former stars.

== Plot ==
Cross-eyed Count Drewa Blanc arrives at the busy Keystone Hotel to judge a fashion show. In the hotel lobby, the chief of police, the mayor, and a gangster try to sway the Count's decision. Upstairs, the house detective investigates some marital shenanigans, some involving a vibrating exercise machine.

The fashion show is held in a banquet hall, where the hotel manager introduces the contestants. The winner is chosen, but the myopic Count awards the trophy to the wrong woman. The chosen winner protests, "How dare you give it to her when I should get it!" She does—an airborne pie misses its target and hits her. This prompts a huge pie fight, and the hotel detective sends for the Keystone Cops. The Cops spring into action and encounter several detours and difficulties before crashing into the hotel.

== Cast ==
- Ford Sterling as Police Chief Sterling
- Ben Turpin as Count Drewa Blanc
- Chester Conklin as Mayor Conklin
- Hank Mann as the House Detective
- Marie Prevost as Mrs. Clarabelle Sterling
- Bert Roach as the Hotel Manager
- Vivien Oakland as Mrs. Carmenchita Conklin
- Dewey Robinson as the Gangster Chief
- June Gittelson as the Count's Admirer
- Jack Duffy as the Man with Ear Trumpet
- The Keystone Cops

== Production ==
In an interview with Leonard Maltin, director Ralph Staub recalled:

The picture, including all the chases, was made in seven days. I personally knew Ford Sterling, Ben Turpin, Chester Conklin, and others appearing in the film. I sold them on starting a new slapstick series. Jack Warner would only permit me to contract with the players for one picture. After the preview at Warner's Hollywood theater, Warner said "sign them for a series," but this was not possible. Their agents were there at the preview and when I approached them, they wanted triple the salary they received in Keystone Hotel. Jack Warner would not go for the hike in salary; I couldn't blame him.

The gigantic pie fight was the talk of the studio on the day it was filmed. As trade columnist James Cunningham reported, "Every executive, every star, every employee on the Warner Brothers' lot at Burbank who could beg, buy, or steal his way in gathered to watch the great pie-tossing scene in Keystone Hotel, a two-reel Vitaphone glorification of The Great Army of Keystone Comedians, starring some of the gallant survivors who are bravely marching on, heads high and gags waving wildly."

== Reception ==
Vitaphone labeled the finished film an "Old Timers" comedy. Audiences loved it, as reported by theater managers. "Believe it or not, this is the first time our house has roared with laughter over a two-reel comedy in years, Old Timers, come again with another one." "If you haven't shown this one already, by all means do so! If the pie-slinging sequence doesn't bring tears of laughter to your eyes, laughing pains to your stomach, and plenty of shoulder vibration, then you had better pay a visit to your nearest psychiatrist." "The old Keystone Cops in a pie-throwing contest. House in an uproar."

Although the stars of Keystone Hotel were no longer available for new films, Warner Bros. went ahead with silent-comedy revivals anyway. The studio consulted its backlog of Mack Sennett silent comedies and compiled them as new two-reel subjects with wisecracking narration, usually voiced by Lou Mercelle or Knox Manning. This series of six shorts ran from 1939 to 1945, beginning with a two-reel condensation of the Ben Turpin feature A Small Town Idol. The others were Love's Intrigue, Happy Faces, Wedding Yells, Happy Times and Jolly Moments, and Good Old Corn. The series continued as "Vitaphone Novelties" (now one reel each, ending with Here We Go Again in 1953). Many of these Warner shorts included footage from Keystone Hotel, without the soundtrack, as exhibits of "authentic" Keystone comedy.

Warner Bros. reissued Keystone Hotel to theaters in 1947 with a new title sequence and an updated musical score. The 1947 edition was first reprinted for television in 1957, and was edited into a one-reel, silent 8mm home movie in 1967. The 1947 reissue is the version that has aired on Turner Classic Movies.
