= King of the Pecos =

1936 film

- Film poster
- Directed by: Joseph Kane
- Written by: Bernard McConville; Dorrell McGowan; Stuart E. McGowan
- Produced by: Trem Carr
- Starring: John Wayne
- Cinematography: Jack A. Marta
- Edited by: Lester Orlebeck
- Distributed by: Republic Pictures
- Release date: March 9, 1936
- Running time: 54 minutes
- Country: United States
- Language: English

King of the Pecos is a 1936 American Western film directed by Joseph Kane and starring John Wayne and Muriel Evans.

== Plot ==
Mr. and Mrs. Clayborn refuse to sell their land to Alexander Stiles. They are subsequently murdered by Stiles' henchmen, who also beat their son John. John goes to live with his grandfather.

Ten years later, John is about to take his bar exam but he remembers what happened to his parents.

Stiles has been gouging the ranchers for the cost of water and paying them a pittance for their cattle. John changes his last name to Clay and agrees to represent the ranchers in court.

The judge rules that Stiles has only claim to one of the many water rights and that the rest are in public domain. Stiles sends his men to file by proxy to get all the water rights. John and the ranchers also rush to the filing office.

Stiles tells his men to wear white arm bands so they won't be shot. John is aware of Stiles' plan and has the ranchers wear the same arm bands.

John catches up to Belle and gives her his arm band. He is subsequently shot in the arm but manages to escape with the help of one of the ranchers. Belle returns to John and apologizes.

It's announced that the cattle are worth $20 a head in Abilene, Kansas. The ranchers decide to take their cattle to Abilene. Stiles steals cattle from some of the ranchers and kills those who protest.

John accompanies the remaining ranchers to Abilene. They must pass through Sweetwater to get water. John captures one of Stiles' men and tells him to advise Stiles to meet him at the Sweetwater gate. John tells Stiles he knows he got the Sweetwater land by killing his parents. John tells him he will stand trial for murder.

A gunfight ensues between the ranchers and Stiles' men. John starts a fires with brush and throws it at the cabin. Stiles' men vacate the cabin, with John and the ranchers chasing them.

John confronts Ash. They draw on each other and John is faster.

John and Belle marry, with all the ranchers in attendance.

== Cast ==
- John Wayne as John Clayborn
- Muriel Evans as Belle Jackson
- Cy Kendall as Alexander Stiles
- Jack Clifford as Henchman Ash
- Arthur Aylesworth as Hank Mathews
- Herbert Heywood as Josh Billings
- J. Frank Glendon as Lawyer Brewster
- Edward Hearn as Eli Jackson
- John Beck as Mr. Clayborn
- Mary MacLaren as Mrs. Clayborn
- Bradley Metcalfe as Little John
- Yakima Canutt as Henchman Pete

== See also ==
- John Wayne filmography
