= Crashing Thru (1939 film) =

1939 film

- Directed by: Elmer Clifton
- Written by: Sherman L. Lowe
- Based on: Renfrew Rides the Range by Laurie York Erskine
- Produced by: Philip N. Krasne
- Starring: James Newill; Jean Carmen; Warren Hull
- Cinematography: Edward Linden
- Edited by: S. Roy Luby
- Production company: Criterion Pictures
- Distributed by: Monogram Pictures
- Release date: December 11, 1939
- Running time: 65 minutes
- Country: United States
- Language: English

Crashing Thru is a 1939 American northern action film directed by Elmer Clifton and starring James Newill, Jean Carmen and Warren Hull. It is based on the 1935 novel Renfrew Rides the Range, the seventh in the popular Renfrew of the Royal Mounted series by Laurie York Erskine.

The film was shot at the Iverson Ranch and on location around Big Bear Lake in the San Bernardino Mountains of California. It was originally intended to be released by Grand National Pictures before being picked up for distribution by Monogram.

== Plot ==
The steamship on which two Mountie officers are travelling is held up and robbed of its gold shipment. They pursue the gang up into the hills but are unable to detain them, They suspect one of the female passengers to be in on the job and arrest her. She turns out to be trying to recover the deeds to the mine that were cheated out of her father, but was double-crossed by the robbers.

== Cast ==
- James Newill as Sergeant Renfrew
- Jean Carmen as Ann 'Angel' Chambers
- Warren Hull as Constable Kelly
- Milburn Stone as Delos Harrington
- Walter Byron as McClusky
- Stanley Blystone as Jim LaMont
- Robert Frazer as Dr. Smith
- Joseph W. Girard as Steamship Captain
- Dave O'Brien as Fred Chambers
- Earl Douglas as Slant Eye
- Ted Adams as Eskimo Pete
- Roy Barcroft as Green - Henchman

== Bibliography ==
- Pitts, Michael R. Western Movies: A Guide to 5,105 Feature Films. McFarland, 2012.
