= Maude Allen =

American actress

- Born: November 30, 1887
- Died: April 24, 1960 (aged 72)
- Occupation: Actress
- Years active: 1930-1942

Maude Allen (November 30, 1887 – April 24, 1960) was an American character actress. She was born in Middleborough, Massachusetts and died in Los Angeles, California, aged 72.

She appeared in several Hollywood films in the 1930s and 1940s, including small roles in Show Boat (1936), San Francisco (1936), and as "Dutchess" in the serial The Adventures of Red Ryder (1940).

== Partial filmography ==
- The Cowboy Millionaire
- Black Diamonds (1940)
- Danger Ahead (1940)
