= Hollywood in Uniform =

1943 film

- Directed by: Ralph Staub
- Produced by: Ralph Staub
- Distributed by: Columbia Pictures
- Release date: August 15, 1943
- Running time: 10 minutes
- Country: United States
- Language: English

Hollywood in Uniform is a 1943 American short documentary film directed by Ralph Staub as part of the Screen Snapshots series. It was nominated for an Academy Award at the 16th Academy Awards for Best Short Subject (One-Reel).

== Cast ==
- Eddie Albert as Himself
- Desi Arnaz as Himself
- Gene Autry as Himself
- Art Baker as Narrator
- John Carroll as Himself
- Jackie Cooper as Himself
- Glenn Ford as Himself
- Clark Gable as Himself
- Van Heflin as Himself
- John Howard as Himself
- Alan Ladd as Himself
- Bela Lugosi as Himself
- George Montgomery as Himself
- Wayne Morris as Himself
- John Payne as Himself
- Tyrone Power as Himself
- Gene Raymond as Himself
- Ronald Reagan as Himself
- Charles "Buddy" Rogers as Himself
- Robert Stack as Himself
- James Stewart as Himself (archive footage)
- Rudy Vallée as Himself
