= Evalyn Bostock =

English-American actress (1917–1944)

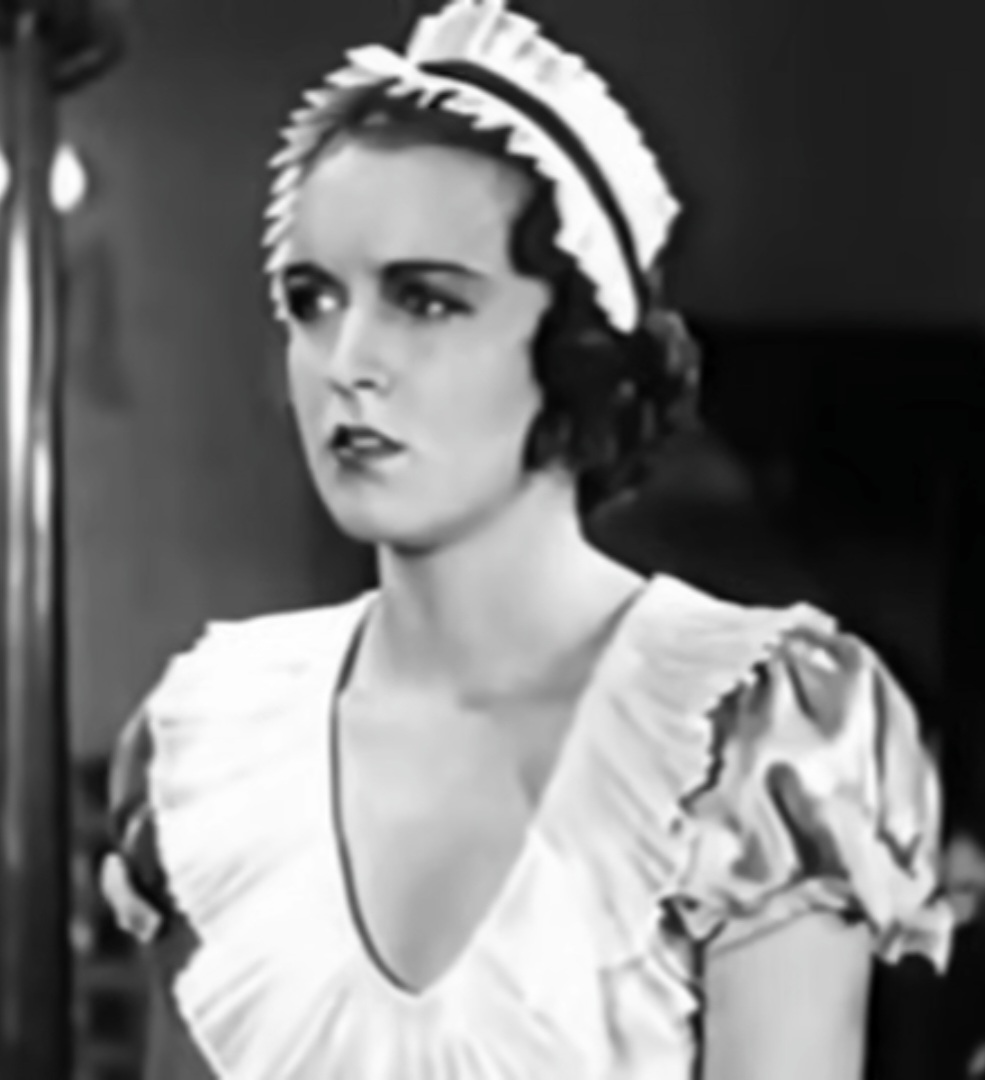
- Bostock in The Moonstone (1934)
- Born: 8 March 1917; Lincolnshire, England
- Died: 28 November 1944 (aged 27); New York City, U.S.
- Resting place: Hollywood Forever Cemetery
- Occupation: Actress
- Years active: 1932–1935

Evalyn Bostock (8 March 1917 – 28 November 1944) was an English-American actress who had lead roles including in the 1935 film The Cowboy Millionaire.

== Personal life ==
Evalyn Bostock was the daughter of George William Bostock (born 1883, died 1968) and Gladys Havelock Caslade (born 1883, died 1957).

She died of poisoning due to accidentally drinking carbon tetrachloride, having mistaken it for her drink while working in a photographic darkroom. She was buried in Hollywood Forever Cemetery.

== Filmography ==
- Thark (1932) as Kitty Stratton
- Perfect Understanding (1933) as Maid
- The Moonstone (1934) as Roseanna Spearman
- The Cowboy Millionaire (1935) as Pamela Barclay
