= The White Panther =

1924 film

- Directed by: Alan James
- Produced by: Phil Goldstone
- Starring: Snowy Baker
- Production company: Phil Goldstone Productions
- Release date: January 1924
- Running time: 5 reels
- Country: United States
- Language: Silent (English intertitles)

The White Panther is a 1924 American drama film set in India starring Australian actor Snowy Baker in a story about the love affair between Major Wainwright, an English officer, and the governor's daughter. It features an early appearance by Boris Karloff. It is considered a lost film.

== Plot ==
As described in a review of the film in a film magazine, Irene Falliday is the daughter of the British governor of an Indian province. She loses a shawl and finds Yasmini wearing it. Irene asks Tommy Farrell, an English officer who is in love with her, to get the shawl back. Yasmiri falls in love with Tommy Farrell. The circumstances of obtaining the shawl shame her in the eyes of her father, Shere Ali, the Sirdar of the Afghans, and his subjects. They seize Irene, but she is saved by "The White Panther," a mysterious raider of the desert on a white horse, who in reality is Major Bruce Wainwright. He has been the champion of all victims of the desert bandits, and fights for Irene at the risk of his life. Tommy is killed in a feud and the British cavalry arrive in time to save Bruce and Irene.

== Cast ==
- Snowy Baker as Major Bruce Wainwright
- Gertrude McConnell as Irene Falliday
- Lois Scott as Yasmini
- Frank Whitson as Shere Ali
- Phil Burke as Tommy Farrell
- William Bainbridge as British governor
- Billy Franey as The Private
- Boris Karloff as "a native"
- Stanely Bigham as The Bandit Leader
