= Snowy Baker =

Australian athlete, sports promoter, and actor

Reginald Baker
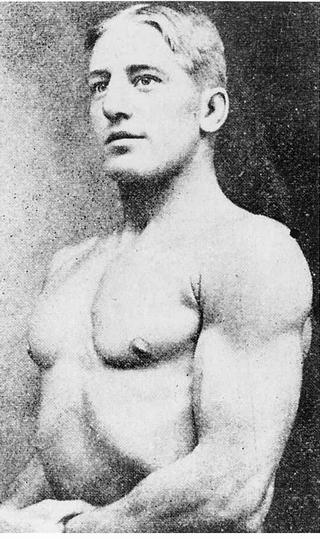
- Born: Reginald Leslie Baker; 8 February 1884 Surry Hills, New South Wales, Australia
- Died: 2 December 1953 (aged 69) Los Angeles, California, US
- Notable relative: Harald Baker (brother)

Rugby union career
- Position: Scrum-half
International career
| Years | Team | Apps | (Points) |
| 1904 | Australia | 2 | (0) |
Medal record
Men's boxing
Representing Australasia
Olympic Games
| Silver medal – second place | 1908 London | Middleweight |

Reginald Leslie "Snowy" Baker (8 February 1884 – 2 December 1953) was an Australian athlete, sports promoter, and actor. Born in Surry Hills, an inner-city suburb of Sydney, New South Wales, Baker excelled at a number of sports, winning New South Wales swimming and boxing championships while still a teenager. Playing rugby union for Eastern Suburbs, he played several games for New South Wales against Queensland, and in 1904 represented Australia in two Test matches against Great Britain. At the 1908 London Olympics, Baker represented Australasia in swimming and diving, as well as taking part in the middleweight boxing event, in which he won a silver medal. He also excelled in horsemanship, water polo, running, rowing and cricket. However, "His stature as an athlete depends largely upon the enormous range rather than the outstanding excellence of his activities; it was as an entrepreneur-showman, publicist and businessman that he seems in retrospect to have been most important."

Baker retired from competition after being injured in a motor-vehicle accident, and became involved in boxing promotion, bringing a number of top fighters from North America and Europe to fight in Australia. During this time, he began to act in a number of silent film roles which showcased his horsemanship, including The Enemy Within, The Man from Kangaroo, and The Shadow of Lightning Ridge. In 1920, Baker left Australia for the United States, where he became known as an entrepreneur and stunt coach. He died in 1953 in Los Angeles, California, from cerebrovascular disease.

== Athletics record ==
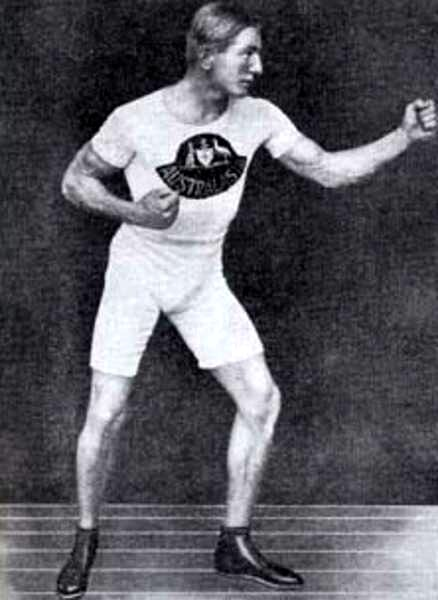
Baker prior to the 1908 Summer Olympics, in which he won a silver medal.

Baker played 26 sports during his lifetime and excelled at most of them:

- At the age of 13 Baker was the New South Wales open swimming champion for 110 and 220 yards (100 and 200m).
- At 16 he played in the Australian Rugby Union team against Great Britain.
- At 17 he was middleweight boxing champion of New South Wales, and
- At 18 took the middleweight and heavyweight boxing titles of Australia.

Baker was also prominent at polo, water polo, cricket and diving, and proficient in surfing, fencing, hockey, rowing, yachting and equestrian events. He appeared at the 1908 London Olympics, representing Australasia in the 4 × 200 m freestyle relay, finishing fourth, and in the diving where he lost in the first round, coming seventh against the powerful Germans who dominated the sport at the time. He also took part in the Olympic boxing competition, where he lost the final match against Johnny Douglas, winning a silver medal. Baker is the only Australian athlete to complete in three separate sports at the Olympic Games, and he did it all at the same Olympics. Supporters of Snowy Baker, later claimed that Douglas' father was the referee and sole judge, but Douglas Sr was there merely to present the medals, in his role as president of the ABA, and had no part in the actual judging.

== Rugby union career ==
Started out his rugby union playing career with the Warrigal FC based at Double Bay on the southern shores of Sydney Harbour, alongside Herbert 'Dally' Messenger and Sid 'Sandy' Pearce. All three moved on to Eastern Suburbs club and much greater prominence. Baker was a scrum-half (and as noted above) gained honours with NSW (now Waratahs) and Australia (now Wallabies).

== Olympic boxing results ==
- Defeated William J. Dees (Great Britain) KO round 2
- Defeated William Childs (Great Britain) Decision
- Defeated William Philo (Great Britain) KO round 1
- Lost to Johnny Douglas (Great Britain) Decision

== Sports administration ==
After his retirement from professional sport following a motor vehicle accident, Baker turned his hand to boxing promotion. Working with a dubious, larger-than-life character by the name of Hugh D. "Huge Deal" McIntosh, Baker became one of the premier boxing promoters in Australia, bringing to the country many of the best boxers of the day from North America and Europe. Numbered among these was the New York light and welterweight Harry Stone. As general manager of Stadia Ltd in 1914, he led negotiations to bring Georges Carpentier to Australia. Baker was responsible for starting the careers of many of Australia's best pugilists, most notably Les Darcy. However, he and Darcy had a major falling out, resulting in the latter stowing away to the United States. Having publicly denounced Darcy over his evasion of war service; when Darcy died in May 1917 from complications resulting from a botched dental procedure, many Australians blamed Baker for his death. It was this fall from grace in the eyes of the Australian public that would ultimately result in Baker's permanent relocation to California.

== Film career ==
Baker became Australia's darling of the screen when his silent movie career took off. His movies included The Enemy Within, The Man from Kangaroo, and The Shadow of Lightning Ridge.

During this same time, he was also writing and editing a publication titled Snowy Baker's Magazine. For many years, until he settled in the United States, Baker was Australia's leading actor and matinee idol. He was called "Australia's first action movie star".

== US career ==
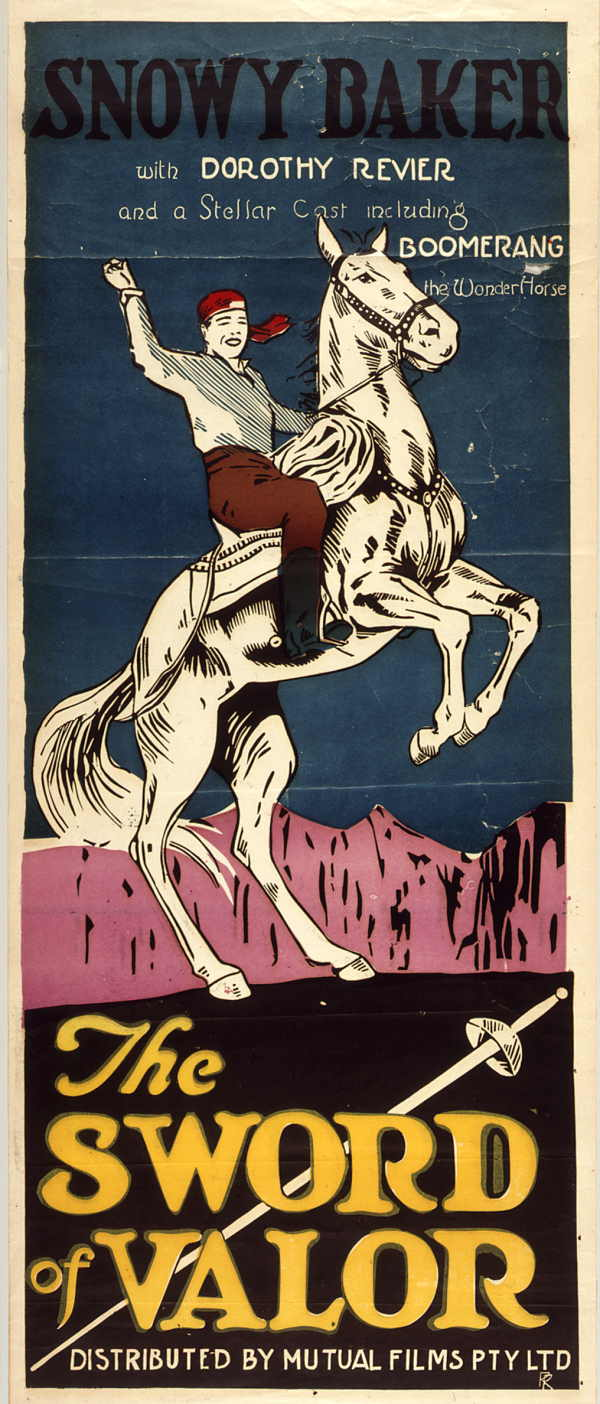
A poster for The Sword of Valor, a 1924 film in which Baker played the lead role.

Baker moved to California in the 1920s. While residing there he acted in some films, managed a polo club and coached such actors as Douglas Fairbanks in horse riding. He taught Elizabeth Taylor, Shirley Temple, Greta Garbo and Rudolph Valentino how to ride, fence and swim.

== Filmography ==
- The Enemy Within (1918)
- The Lure of the Bush (1918)
- The Man from Kangaroo (1920)
- The Shadow of Lightning Ridge (1920)
- The Jackeroo of Coolabong (1920) aka The Fighting Breed
- Sleeping Acres (1921)
- Pals (1923)
- His Last Race (1923)
- The White Panther (1924)
- The Empire Builders (1924)
- The Sword of Valor (1924)
- Fighter's Paradise (1924)
- Big City (1937)
- The Kid From Texas (1939)

=== Stage ===
- The Bonded Woman (1922) - Los Angeles
