= Fighting Mad (1939 film) =

1939 American film by Sam Newfield

- Theatrical release poster
- Directed by: Sam Newfield
- Screenplay by: George Rosener; John Rathmell
- Based on: Renfrew Rides Again by Laurie York Erskine
- Produced by: Philip N. Krasne
- Starring: James Newill; Sally Blane; Benny Rubin; Dave O'Brien; Milburn Stone; Walter Long
- Cinematography: Jack Greenhalgh
- Edited by: Martin G. Cohn
- Production company: Criterion Pictures
- Distributed by: Monogram Pictures
- Release date: November 5, 1939
- Running time: 54 minutes
- Country: United States
- Language: English

Fighting Mad is a 1939 American adventure film directed by Sam Newfield and written by George Rosener and John Rathmell. It is based on the 1927 novel Renfrew Rides Again by Laurie York Erskine. The third of the Renfrew of the Royal Mounted film series stars James Newill, Sally Blane, Benny Rubin, Dave O'Brien, Milburn Stone and Walter Long. The film was released on November 5, 1939, by Monogram Pictures when Grand National Pictures ceased operation.

== Plot ==
Ann Fenwick, a witness to a bank robbery, is abducted by the bank robbers across the border into Canada, where Sergeant Renfrew and Constable Kelly get involved.

== Cast ==
- James Newill as Sergeant Renfrew
- Sally Blane as Ann Fenwick
- Benny Rubin as Benny
- Dave O'Brien as Constable Kelly
- Milburn Stone as Cardigan
- Walter Long as Frenchy
- Warner Richmond as Trigger
- Ted Adams as Leon
- Chief Thundercloud as Indian
- Ole Olsen as Joe
- Horace Murphy as Smith
