= Murder on the Yukon =

1940 film by Louis J. Gasnier

- Theatrical release poster
- Directed by: Louis J. Gasnier
- Screenplay by: Milton Raison
- Based on: Renfrew Rides North by Laurie York Erskine
- Produced by: Philip N. Krasne
- Starring: James Newill; Polly Ann Young; Dave O'Brien; Al St. John; William Royle; Chief Thundercloud
- Cinematography: Elmer Dyer
- Edited by: Guy V. Thayer Jr.
- Production company: Criterion Pictures
- Distributed by: Monogram Pictures
- Release date: February 25, 1940
- Running time: 58 minutes
- Country: United States
- Language: English

Murder on the Yukon is a 1940 American adventure film directed by Louis J. Gasnier and written by Milton Raison. It is based on the 1931 novel Renfrew Rides North by Laurie York Erskine. The film stars James Newill, Polly Ann Young, Dave O'Brien, Al St. John, William Royle and Chief Thundercloud. The film was released on February 25, 1940, by Monogram Pictures.

== Plot ==
Joan Manning and George Weathers are partners in the trading post where miner Jim Smithers exchanges his gold dust for cash. Jim’s unexpected announcement that he plans to leave for Montreal disturbs Weathers, who is the clandestine head of a counterfeiting ring, because Jim is carrying his phony money. Consequently, Weathers orders his henchman, Hawks, to kill Jim before he passes the money in the city. Sergeant Renfrew and Constable Kelly are on vacation when they come across the dead body, lying in his canoe, shot through the heart. Renfrew rides to Jim’s cabin to search for clues and is attacked by Weathers’ men, who have since removed the rest of the counterfeit money. Jim’s brother is found dead, along with a suicide note claiming that he’d killed himself after murdering Jim, but Renfrew suspects murder after finding a counterfeit bill. Kelly follows Monti, an Indian who works for Weathers, to the counterfeiter’s hideout, where he is captured by the gang. From the riverbank, Renfrew sees the gang escaping in canoes and apprehends one of the boats, where he discovers the money hidden among fur pelts. Monti and Hawks escape with the rest of the furs and take refuge at the trading post. There, Renfrew surprises them and arrests Hawks for the murders. Before he can round up the counterfeiters, however, the gang jumps Renfrew and takes him prisoner. Meanwhile, at the hideout, Kelly escapes and comes to the rescue. Together, Sergeant Renfrew and Constable Kelly arrest the gang.

Murder on the Yukon suffered stiff competition when Republic released Hi-Yo Silver, a feature-length motion picture based on the popular radio program, The Lone Ranger. The movie was a condensation of the 15-chapter cliffhanger serial released a couple years prior. (Chief Thundercloud was in the cast of both films: as the sidekick Tonto on Hi-Yo Silver, and as Manti, the henchman, in Murder on the Yukon.)

Among the highlights of watching Murder on the Yukon today are two famous comedians of the silent days, Snub Pollard and Al St. John, cast in minor roles. Actress Polly Ann Young played the female lead in this movie, but her role was so diminutive that, after having played the female leads in Tim McCoy and Buck Jones westerns at Columbia, she was practically hired and incorporated into the story for the sake of adding a female eye candy to the screen. Actress Dorothea Kent received more screen time in the next entry, Danger Ahead. Kent, who was used to better camera breaks and parts when with Universal as a feature player, took care of herself under the circumstances.

== Cast ==
- James Newill as Renfrew
- Polly Ann Young as Joan Manning
- Dave O'Brien as Constable Kelly
- Al St. John as Bill Smithers
- William Royle as George Weathers
- Chief Thundercloud as Manti
- Karl Hackett as Hawks
- Snub Pollard as Archie
- Kenne Duncan as Tom
- Earl Douglas as Steve
- Budd Buster as Jim Smithers
