= Ralph Staub =

American film director

Ralph Staub (July 21, 1899, in Chicago, Illinois – October 22, 1969, in Los Angeles, California) was a movie director, writer, and producer.

He broke into the motion picture industry in 1920, filming short travelogues in Alaska. Relocating to Hollywood, he sold his services to various short-subject companies. He undertook all the filmmaking duties himself: producer, director, writer, photographer, film editor, special effects man, electrician, and prop man.

In 1933 he joined the Warner Bros. shorts department, where he directed slapstick comedies (his most famous being 1935's Keystone Hotel) and musicals (many filmed in Technicolor). He left Warners in 1936 and joined Republic Pictures as a feature-film director; this engagement lasted through 1938. He had short stints at Universal Pictures and Monogram Pictures in 1939–40.

Since 1931 Ralph Staub had been contributing to Columbia Pictures' Screen Snapshots series of short subjects, as a writer. In 1940 he began directing the Snapshots reels, which usually covered movie-related public events and behind-the-scenes glimpses of moviemaking. Columbia appointed him a producer in 1943, and he devoted himself to Screen Snapshots for the next 15 years. Each reel was hosted by a celebrity, who would introduce the topic and narrate the location footage.

In 1946 Ralph Staub explained how he worked with the stars: "If you make your reels novel and refreshing enough to interest your subjects as well as the prospective audience, you'll find them a lot more cooperative. It's important, too, to get your scenes quickly and with as little fuss and bother as possible. I always plan my shooting in order to save the stars' time and make it as easy for them as I can. I've even called in the players' favorite makeup men or hairdressers, so they would be confident of looking their best for the camera. When I promised Marlene Dietrich and Jack Benny that they could see the completed reels in which they appeared, I made very sure that they did view it before release." Although Staub had made his reputation as a one-man production crew, lighting, photographing, and directing films himself, his Columbia setup typically involved a staff of 20 people: four on the camera crew, five on the sound crew, two electricians, two grips, one assistant director, one makeup artist, one hairdresser, and four drivers. Columbia, seeing increased demand for the series, raised the number of film prints from 60 per subject to 125.

In the 1950s, when budgets were lowered for short-subject production, Staub would save time and money by hosting the films himself, and would consult his film library for old footage that he could fit into his new productions. For example, an untitled 1940 reel (Series 21, No. 1) emceed by Ken Murray and covering a gay-nineties-themed party, was recycled for Staub's 1951 reel Hollywood Pie Throwers. Certain of the Screen Snapshots reels received special attention (and custom-made promotional accessories) when they featured exceptionally popular stars. Hollywood Fun Festival (1952) covered the appearances of Martin and Lewis at the opening of Lewis's camera shop in Los Angeles, and at other Hollywood functions. "With Dean Martin and Jerry Lewis as the lure, this can be sold. This is exploitable to the hilt," advised the trade paper The Exhibitor. Theater owners could post the stars' names on the marquee and outside the theater without having to pay feature-film prices.

Ralph Staub's skill at patching together old film clips into new productions made him an ideal choice to direct Showtime, a syndicated TV series produced by Ben Frye in 1955. Frye owned the library of Snader Telescriptions, three-minute musical films produced for television, and hired comedian Frank Fontaine to host the series. Staub staged each half-hour program like a live vaudeville show, with Fontaine appearing in front of a theater curtain. Fontaine would deliver a comic monologue, then introduce a filmed performance from the Snader library, as though the performers were taking the stage in person.

Columbia discontinued almost all of its short-subject series in 1956, but Columbia president Harry Cohn made an exception for Screen Snapshots. Staub proposed filming the shorts in color, and this marketable novelty kept the series going for two more years. Columbia introduced a Screen Snapshots "Guess Who?" contest in which audience members could identify mystery actors and win a free trip to Hollywood. Harry Cohn was sentimental about Screen Snapshots because it had put Columbia on the map: it was the oldest film series still in production, going back to 1920 and the dawn of the studio. Ralph Staub proudly stated, "I don't have any contract. Every Christmas I just go up and shake hands with Harry Cohn. Then I'm all set for another year's work!" Cohn died in February 1958; had he lived longer, Screen Snapshots would almost certainly have continued. The last film in the series was Glamorous Hollywood (released June 26, 1958, after Cohn's death), with Staub and crew setting up cameras at a charity function hosted by Jane Russell.

Three of Ralph Staub's Screen Snapshots shorts were nominated for an Academy Award. Staub was awarded a star on the Hollywood Walk of Fame at 1752 Vine Street in Hollywood, California, USA.

== Partial filmography ==
- As director
  - What, No Men! (1934) short subject
  - Art Trouble (1934) short subject; film debut of James Stewart
  - Keystone Hotel (1935) short subject
  - Carnival Day (1936) short subject
  - Sitting on the Moon (1936)
  - Country Gentlemen (1936) with Olsen and Johnson
  - The Mandarin Mystery (1936)
  - Join the Marines (1937)
  - Navy Blues (1937)
  - Affairs of Cappy Ricks (1937)
  - Meet the Boyfriend (1937)
  - Mama Runs Wild (1937)
  - Prairie Moon (1938) with Gene Autry
  - Western Jamboree (1938)
  - Swing Hotel (1939)
  - Chip of the Flying U (1939)
  - Yukon Flight (1940)
  - Danger Ahead (1940)
  - Sky Bandits (1940)
  - Hollywood in Uniform (1943, Screen Snapshots)
  - Hollywood Fun Festival (1952, Screen Snapshots) with Martin and Lewis
  - Glamorous Hollywood (1958, last Screen Snapshots film)
