= Sleeping Acres =

1921 film

- Directed by: Bertram Bracken
- Produced by: Colonel William N. Selig
- Starring: Snowy Baker; Wallace Beery; Frank Campeau; Jack Mulhall
- Release date: 1921
- Country: USA
- Language: silent

Sleeping Acres is a 1921 American film starring Australian actor Snowy Baker. It was Baker's first American movie and was made for producer Willian N. Selig who specialised in adventure tales. A contemporary fan magazine said that " The Australian possesses a magnetic screen personality. His novel stunts, thrilling athletic feats, and superb horsemanship feature his American debut." The picture also features Wallace Beery.
