= The Cowboy Millionaire (1935 film) =

1935 film by Edward F. Cline

- Theatrical release poster
- Directed by: Edward F. Cline
- Screenplay by: George Waggner; Daniel Jarrett
- Story by: Daniel Jarrett
- Produced by: Sol Lesser
- Starring: George O'Brien; Evalyn Bostock; Edgar Kennedy; Maude Allen; Stephen Chase; Daniel Jarrett
- Cinematography: Frank B. Good
- Edited by: W. Donn Hayes
- Production company: Fox Film Corporation
- Distributed by: Fox Film Corporation
- Release date: May 10, 1935
- Running time: 65 minutes
- Country: United States
- Language: English

The Cowboy Millionaire is a 1935 American Western film directed by Edward F. Cline and written by George Waggner and Daniel Jarrett. The film stars George O'Brien, Evalyn Bostock, Edgar Kennedy, Maude Allen, Stephen Chase and Daniel Jarrett. The film was released on May 10, 1935, by Fox Film Corporation.

== Plot ==
Bob Walker and his sidekick Persimmon work at a dude-ranch-type luxury hotel in order to gain money to work their gold mine. English ingénue Pamala Barclay comes to the hotel and eventually falls in love with Bob but returns to Great Britain after she discovers he made a bet that he would have a relationship with her. Meanwhile, a con man attempts to buy the yet unproductive gold mine for a cheap price from Persimmon with the two going to England. When the mine hits pay dirt, Bob travels to London to fight for his mine and his lady love.

== Cast ==
- George O'Brien as Bob Walker
- Evalyn Bostock as Pamela Barclay
- Edgar Kennedy as Willy Persimmon Bates
- Maude Allen as Henrietta Barclay
- Stephen Chase as Hadley Thornton
- Daniel Jarrett as Edward Doyle
- Lloyd Ingraham as Ben Barclay
- Dean Benton as Desk Clerk
- Thomas A. Curran as Mr. Nolan
