= The Sword of Valor =

1924 film

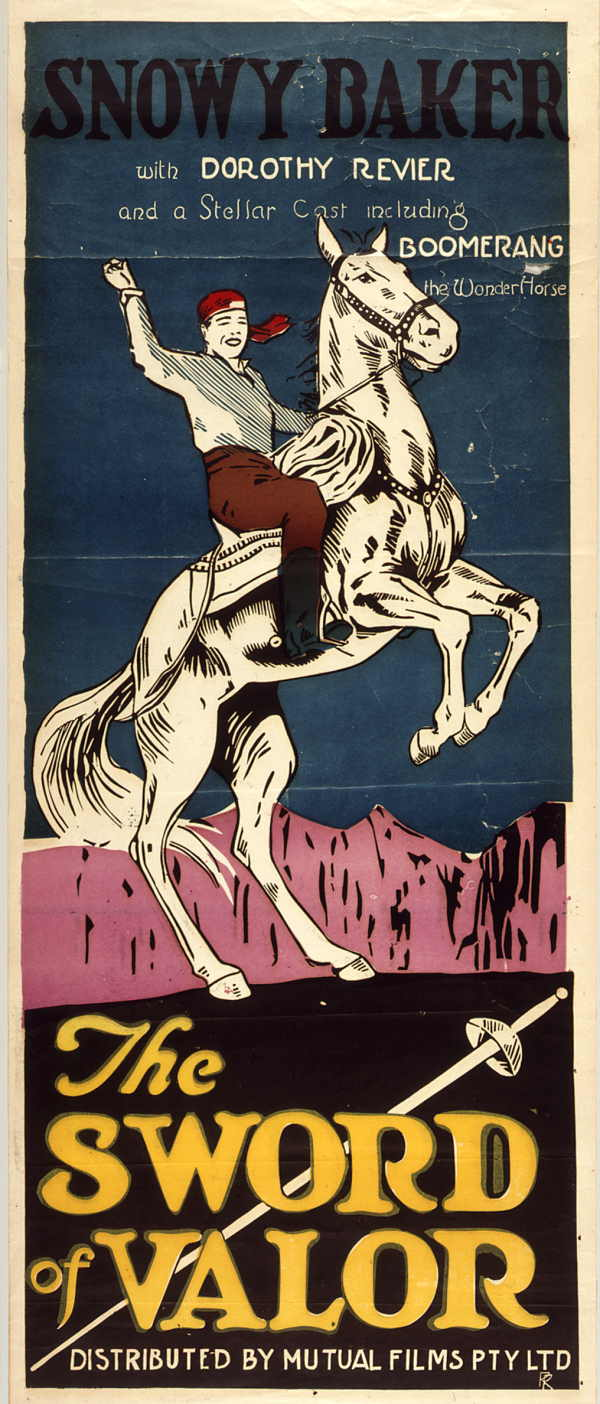
- Film poster
- Directed by: Duke Worne
- Written by: Jefferson Moffitt
- Based on: original story by Julio Sabello
- Produced by: Phil Goldstone
- Starring: Snowy Baker
- Cinematography: Roland Price
- Production company: Goldstone Pictures
- Release date: May 6, 1924
- Running time: 5 reels
- Country: United States
- Language: Silent (English intertitles)

The Sword of Valor is a 1924 American film starring Snowy Baker as an American sailor who falls in love with the daughter of a Spanish nobleman.

== Plot ==
American sailor Captain Crooks (Baker) falls in love with Ynez Montego (Revier), daughter of Don Guzman de Ruis y Montejo (Lederer), who wants Ynez to marry the wealthy Eurasian, Ismid Matrouli (Cecil).

Her father takes her to the Riviera where she is kidnapped by a deranged gypsy mountaineer and Crooks sets out to rescue her. He has to fight a leading swordsman.

== Cast ==
- Snowy Baker as Captain Grant Lee Cooks
- Otto Lederer as Don Guzma de Ruis y Montejo
- Edwin Cecil as Ismid Matrouli
- Dorothy Revier as Ynez

== Preservation status ==
According to the Silent Era website, a print exists. The film was shown at the Pordenone Silent Film Festival in 2021.
