= Fighter's Paradise =

1924 film

- Directed by: Alvin J. Neitz
- Produced by: Phil Goldstone
- Starring: Snowy Baker
- Release date: 1924
- Country: USA
- Language: silent

Fighter's Paradise is a 1924 American film starring Snowy Baker as a man mistaken for a boxer.
