= His Last Race =

1923 film

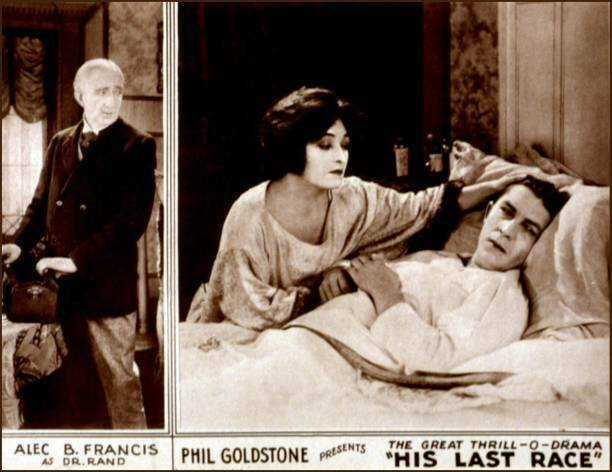
- Directed by: Reeves Eason; Howard Mitchell
- Produced by: Phil Goldstone
- Starring: Pauline Starke; Noah Beery; Snowy Baker
- Cinematography: Jackson Rose
- Production company: Phil Goldstone Productions
- Release date: August: 1923
- Running time: 5,800 feet
- Country: United States
- Language: Silent (English intertitles)

His Last Race is a 1923 American film starring Australian actor Reginald Leslie "Snowy" Baker. It was billed as a "thrill-o-drama" with a story written around action scenes.

== Plot ==
A horse is about to take its last race. Gangsters try to ensure the horse does not win.

== Cast ==
- Rex (Snowy) Baker as Carleton
- Gladys Brockwell as Mary
- William Scott as Stewart
- Harry Depp as Denny
- Pauline Starke as Denny's wife
- Robert McKim as Tim Bresnahan
- Noah Beery as Packy Sloane
- Boomerang as himself, a horse
- Tully Marshall as Mr. Strong
- King Baggot
- Harry Burns
- Dick Sutherland
- Alec B. Francis
- Bob Kortman as henchman

== Production ==
Charles Chauvel worked on the film.
