= Happy Little Submarines 4: Adventure of Octopus =

- Chinese theatrical release poster
- Directed by: James Hol
- Written by: James Hol; Ian Farthing
- Produced by: Jin Guo-Ping; Chen Zheng; Zhao Ming-Jian; Liz Young; Mike Young
- Starring: Marshall Archibald; Victor Atelevich; Caitlyn Bairstow; Olivia Duke; Rebecca Husain; Maureen Jones; Ellen Kennedy; Griffin Kingston; Colin Murdock
- Music by: Ceiri Torjussen
- Production companies: GDC Shenzhen Film And Television Company Limited; Splash Entertainment
- Distributed by: Universal Pictures
- Release date: May 30, 2014
- Running time: 80 minutes
- Countries: China; United States
- Languages: Mandarin; English
- Box office: US$7.39 million

Happy Little Submarines 4: Adventure of Octopus (Chinese: 潜艇总动员4：章鱼奇遇记; pinyin: Qiántǐng zǒngdòngyuán 4: Zhāngyú qíyù jì; lit. 'Sub-Mariner 4: The Adventures of the Octopus', also known as Dive Olly Dive and the Octopus Rescue in the United States) is a 2014 adventure comedy animated film directed by James Hol.

== Plot ==
Charlie the Octopus’ dreams of becoming a World Famous Soccer Star are given a rude awakening in this wonderful under-sea extravaganza. While swimming for his life from rent collectors, Charlie inadvertently enters a “Star Finder” variety show run by Snarky Sharkskin and boogies himself to fame and fortune.

== English cast ==
- Sam Vincent as Charlie, a fraternal pink octopus
- Griffin Kingston as Olly, a yellow submarine
- Marshall Archibald as Charlie Jr, Charlie's son
- Victor Atelevich as Handsome, a seahorse
- Caitlyn Bairstow
- Olivia Duke as Beth, a female yellow submarine and Olly's best friend
- Rebecca Husain
- Maureen Jones as Mama Cai, the elderly member of Charlie's family
- Ellen Kennedy as Bobsie, a sea otter
- Colin Murdock
- Michael Shepherd as Snarky Sharkskin, a great white shark with a eyepatch

== Chinese cast ==
- Jiang Ke
- Wang Xiaotong
- Li Ye

== Reception ==
The film has grossed US$7.39 million at the Chinese box office.

== See also ==
- Happy Little Submarine Magic Box of Time (2015)
