= Ellen J. Kennedy =

American academic

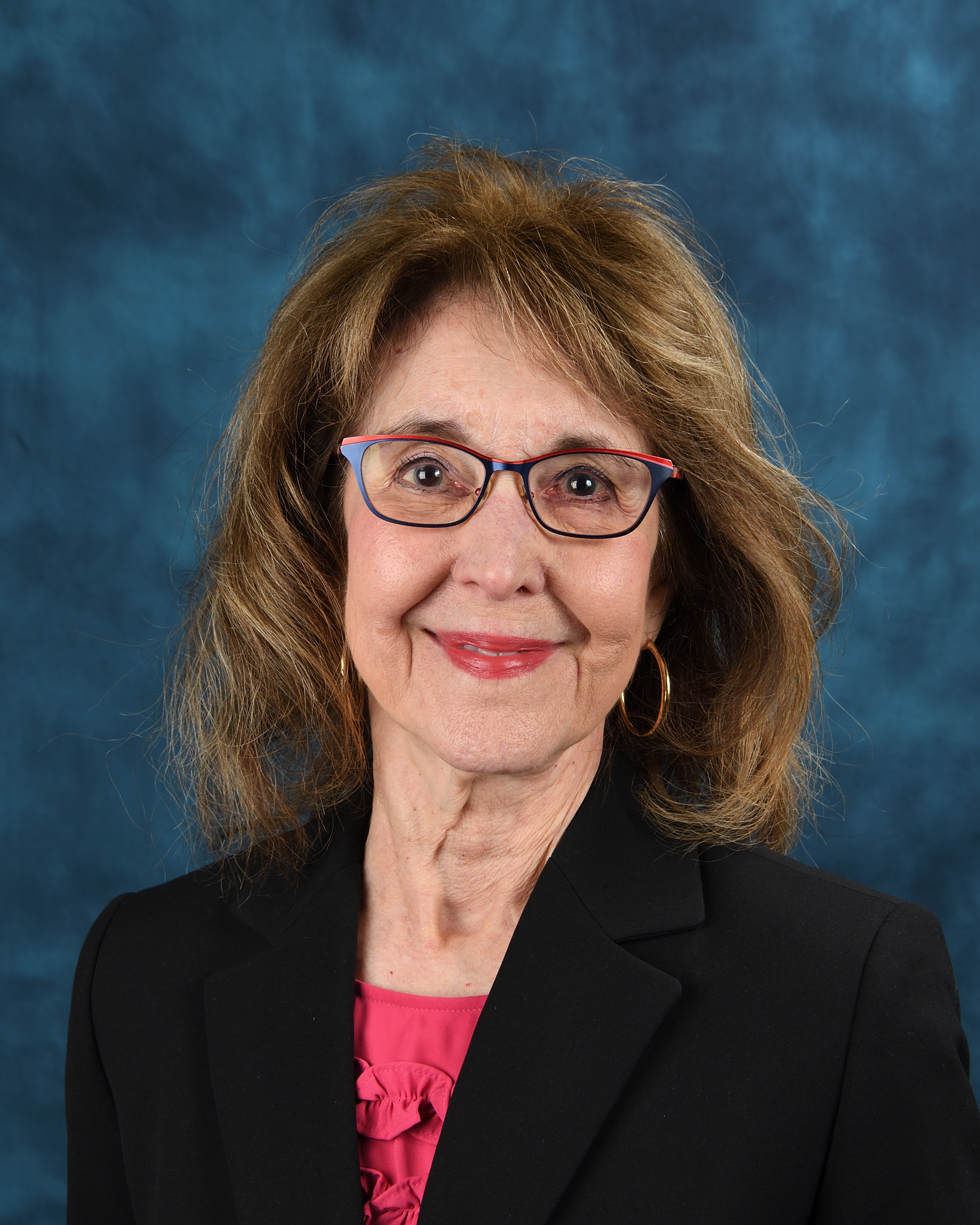

Ellen J. Kennedy is a U.S. academic who is the founder and executive director of World Without Genocide, a human rights organization headquartered in Minneapolis, MN.

Kennedy promotes Holocaust, genocide, and human rights education in colleges, universities, faith-based organizations, and civic groups. She advocates with elected officials at the city, state, national, and international levels on genocide prevention and human rights issues.

She founded World Without Genocide in 2006. World Without Genocide is a 501(c)(3) non-profit organization which advocates for state, national, and international efforts to protect innocent people from discrimination, violence, and hate; prevent genocides and other mass atrocities; prosecute perpetrators of genocide, crimes against humanity, and war crimes; and remember those whose lives and communities have been affected by violence.

World Without Genocide in Special Consultative Status with the United Nations Economic and Social Council since 2022. Kennedy and other World Without Genocide leaders attend international meetings, submit reports, and advocate for an end to genocide and other mass atrocities through the just rule of law. World Without Genocide is a member of the Association of Holocaust Organizations, American NGO Coalition for the International Criminal Court, and Minnesota Alliance for the International Criminal Court.

Kennedy co-produced two documentary films with Twin Cities Public Television, which are available online.

1. Children of Genocide: Five Who Survived (nominated for a Regional Emmy Award) interviews five people who were children or young adults when catastrophes occurred in their countries. The five represent the Holocaust, Cambodia, Rwanda, Bosnia, and Sudan. Each of them now, as adults, is committed to raising awareness about genocide, with the deep hope that the words ‘never again’ will someday mean ‘never.’ They encourage citizen action to take a stand against genocide.

2. Genocide Again: Darfur follows the story of a young man from Darfur who walked 800 miles to escape the genocide. Experts and peace advocates discuss the history of genocide in Sudan and why it continues today.

Kennedy has written 8 readers’ theater plays about ‘Upstanders,’ people who acted heroically during genocides to rescue others, to tell the truth, or to bring perpetrators to justice despite difficult and dangerous circumstances. The plays are used in schools, faith, and civic organizations across Minnesota and the US.

She developed two travelling exhibits:

1. ‘Tents of Witness: Genocide and Conflict’ (2010-19) featured 10 tents like those used in refugee camps, each depicting a group persecuted based on race, religion, ethnicity, or national origin.

2. ‘Genocide and Justice: From Nuremberg to the International Criminal Court’ has been displayed at the Minnesota State Capitol several times, colleges and universities throughout the country, faith organizations, and area theatres.

Kennedy has spoken at 980 events to more than 82,000 people (as of March 2026). She has held programs in California, Florida, Illinois, Indiana, Iowa, Maryland, Michigan, Minnesota, Missouri, Montana, New Hampshire, New Jersey, New York, North Dakota, Ohio, Texas, Wyoming, Washington, Washington, D.C., and Wisconsin, and in Armenia, Bosnia, Canada, Cyprus, Malta, Norway, Portugal, and the United Kingdom.

Kennedy has been the representative of World Without Genocide to the United Nations Department of Global Communications.

== Education ==
Kennedy graduated from Ishpeming High School in Ishpeming, Michigan. Kennedy earned a Bachelor of Arts in English and Psychology from the University of Michigan in 1969. She has a master's degree in Communications (1972) and English (1971) from Northern Michigan University, and a master's degree in Sociology from the University of Minnesota in 1986. She holds a doctorate in Marketing (1988) and a doctorate in Sociology (2001) from the University of Minnesota.

== Teaching ==
Kennedy was a professor at St. Catherine University from 1979 to 1987 (tenured), the University of St. Thomas from 1987 to 2007 (tenured), Carleton College in 2007, the University of Minnesota – Twin Cities in 2009, and an adjunct professor at Mitchell Hamline School of Law from 2011 to present.

She served as the Interim Director for the Center for Holocaust and Genocide Studies, University of Minnesota, from 2008 to 2010.

Kennedy taught overseas in Australia, China, Costa Rica, England, India, Israel, Jamaica, Poland, Russia, Semester at Sea, Sweden, and Ukraine.

== Published articles ==
Kennedy has published articles on human rights, genocide, sociology, and marketing in academic and mass publications.

- “Minnesotans support the International Criminal Court,” Post Bulletin, by Ellen J. Kennedy, Ph.D., August 5, 2026
- “‘Denaturalization’ undermines human rights, and our humanity,” Pioneer Press, by Ellen J. Kennedy, Ph.D., August 1, 2026
- “Minnesota stands up to ICE raids by ‘neighboring’,” Duluth News Tribune, by Ellen J. Kennedy, Ph.D., July 19, 2026
- “Trump is waging another war – on the International Criminal Court,” The Minnesota Star Tribune, by Ellen J. Kennedy, Ph.D., July 9, 2026
- “From ‘neighboring’ to justice: Operation Metro Surge,” MinnPost, by Ellen J. Kennedy, Ph.D., July 6, 2026
- “US is shirking its obligation,” by Ellen J. Kennedy, Ph.D., Minnesota Reformer, December 8, 2025
- “A wrongful-death lawsuit and the growing movement against ‘ecocide’” by Ellen J. Kennedy, Ph.D., MinnPost, June 19, 2025
- “Tightening government? A laudable goal, but beware the ‘anti-bureaucratic revolution’” by Ellen J. Kennedy, Ph.D., Twin Cities Pioneer Press, March 17, 2025
- “Commemorating liberation at Auschwitz on International Holocaust Remembrance Day” by Ellen J. Kennedy, Ph.D., Prof. Anantanand Rambachan, and Rabbi Adam Stock Spilker, MinnPost, January 27, 2025
- “Global courts poised to criminalize environmental devastation” by Ellen J. Kennedy, Ph.D., Duluth News Tribune, January 2, 2025
- “Protect the International Criminal Court’s mission to affirm peace, justice, security and equality” by Ellen J. Kennedy, Ph.D., Twin Cities Pioneer Press, December 17, 2024
- “The ‘Rest of the Story’ — rape and incest” by Ellen J. Kennedy, Ph.D., Post Bulletin, October 10, 2024
- “Nothing but the sound of silence for Sudan” by Ellen J. Kennedy, Ph.D., MinnPost, October 3, 2024
- “Starvation: A War Crime” by Ellen J. Kennedy, Ph.D., Twin Cities Pioneer Press, July 22, 2024

== Awards ==
Kennedy has received awards for her work:

- Global Citizenship Award, University of St. Thomas, 2003
- Higher Education Leader of the Year Award, National Society for Experiential Education, 2004
- Human Rights Award, City of Edina, Minnesota, 2007
- Outstanding Citizen Award, Anne Frank Center, New York, 2009
- Change-Maker Award, Minnesota Women's Press, 2010
- Prominent Minnesotan, Osher Lifelong Learning Institute, 2019
- Director's Community Leadership Award from the FBI, 2023
- Distinguished Alumni Award from Northern Michigan University, 2023
- Woman of Valor Award from Forward Global Women, 2023
- Liberty Bell Award from Ramsey County Bar Association, 2023
