= Keystone Hotel (Lampasas, Texas) =

Coordinates: 31.0665°N 98.17915°W

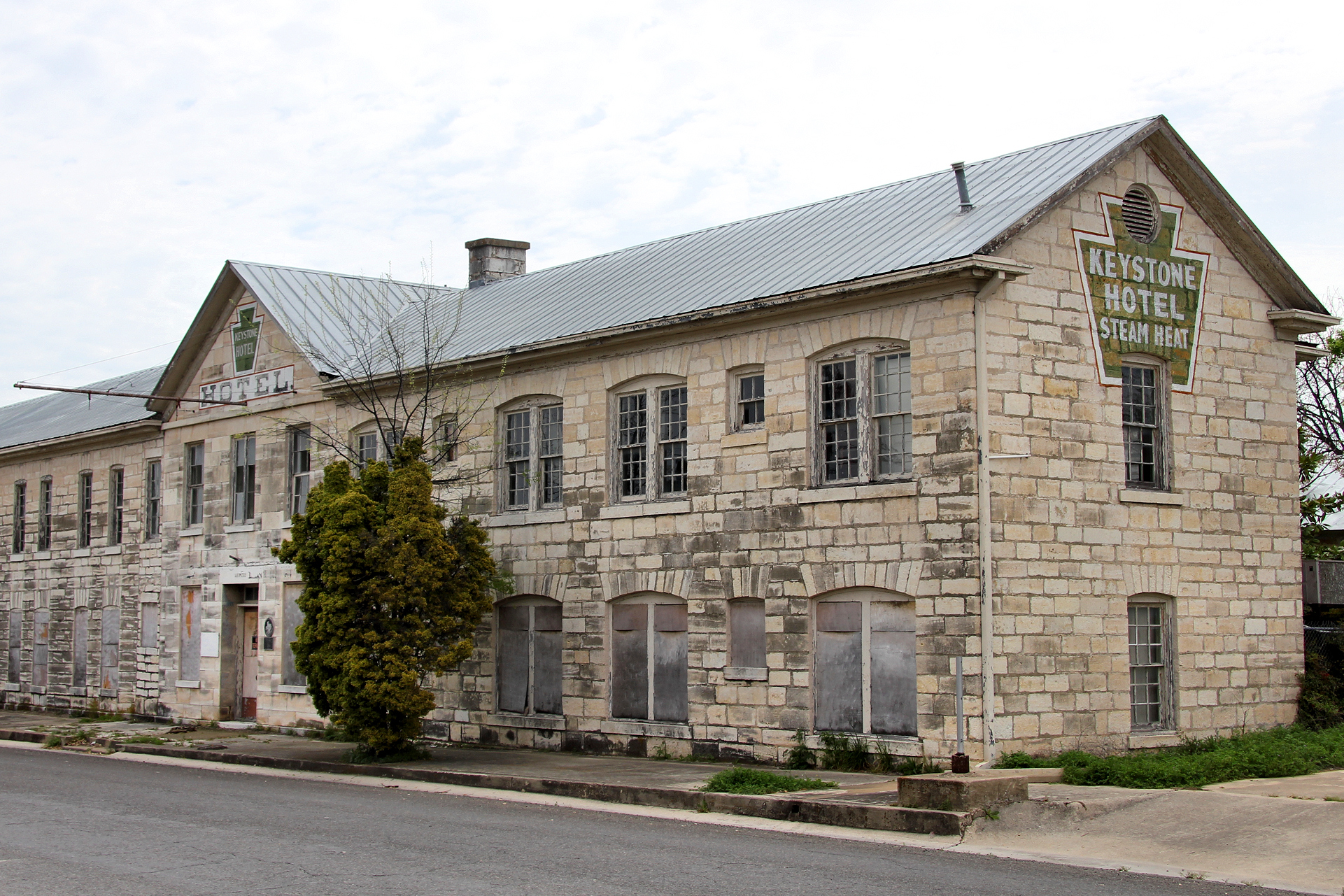
The Keystone Hotel in 2015

The Keystone Hotel Building (Originally Star Hotel) was a formerly famous stagecoach inn built in 1856 that was vacant for over thirty years and is now being restored Recorded Texas Historic Landmark. The Keystone Hotel building is in Lampasas, Texas which is on the National Register of Historic Places.

== Building description ==
The building is a two-storied limestone building with a metal roof, built in the Colonial Revival style. The east and west end walls have "steam heat" signs painted on the limestone walls.

It has a historical marker on it, saying the following:

Keystone Hotel, 1870. Famous early-day stagecoach inn of J.L.N. Gracy. Windows have keystone arches. Native rock was hauled to site by oxen. In rear was the grave of boy killed by Indians; also bell tower, house for employees. Wagon yard was across road. Recorded Texas historic landmark, 1965.

== Building history ==
The Star Hotel was originally constructed in 1856 and was owned and run by J.L.N. Gracy, the Gracys were among Lampasas's first settlers in 1855. In 1870, ten rooms were added to the east end of the building. The building was briefly named the Scott Hotel from 1923 to 1926 when it was purchased by Mr. J.R. Key in 1926 and modernized in 1929. He changed the hotel's name to the Keystone. An extension was added to the west end in 1931 that added an additional seven extra rooms. When the Keystone ceased to be a hotel it served as an attorney's office, an insurance office, the Keystone Savings and Loan, and finally a bank. The last inhabitants were the Clays who lived in what had previously been the kitchen wing. The building remained unoccupied until December 2017 when it was purchased by Austin resident, Andrew Fish.

There are three parts to the building. The center portion, which was built in 1856, was the stagecoach stop for the Austin Stage. The two-story Eastern wing with ten rooms was added in 1870. The wing was connected to the original structure by an outside stone staircase that was later enclosed, the stairwell walls plastered and a ceiling added. In the attic above the staircase are engraved stones with a star, the word "Hotel", and the date "1870". The western wing was added in 1931. A stone located on the front of the building to the right of the 1856 section is engraved with 1931 and the name of Mr. Key who purchased the hotel in 1926.

Of note is a well that is located in the West wing. The well was dug in 1856 and provided water for the hotel, however, when city water became available in the 1890s the well was filled which included the lightning rods that had been removed from the roof in the late 1890s when the roof was changed from wood shingle. The 1931 addition was built over the top of the well. During the restoration process the well was located and reopened, hitting water at 20 feet.

The restoration is returning the 1870 portion to the original ten rooms, nine with their own fireplace. One room never had a fireplace. Central air conditioning and heating are being added but hidden. The enclosed stairwell has been reopened, and the stairwell walls have been returned to bare stone. The ceiling was removed so the star symbol and the words "Hotel 1870" are exposed. The downstairs of the 1856 portion is being returned to original with the reception area inside the front doors and a living room in the back room, which was originally the dining room. The upstairs of the 1856 portion which was, at one point, eight small rooms has been converted into a master suite in the back and what had been Mrs. Gracy's entertainment room in the front. The 1931 wing has been converted into a ballroom with a balcony overlooking the dance floor and a catwalk down the South side. The original exterior porches, which were covered up in the 1970s, have been uncovered and restored to original. Mr. Key added steam heat to the building in the 1929. The boiler and related equipment were previously removed. The underground boiler room will be turned into a wine cellar.

The restoration process began in January 2018 and the first phase is scheduled to be completed in December 2018. Interested parties can follow the progress of the restoration and stories about the hotel on the Keystone Star Hotel Facebook page.

== Boy killed by Indians ==
A compilation of the historical records by Mike Cox was published in the Polk County Enterprise on September 1, 2013.

The grave of the boy killed by Indians, referenced in the historical marker, is no longer present. It was the grave of 15-year-old James Edward Luther Gracy, whose parents, John Newton and Harriet B. Gracy, ran the Star Hotel in Lampasas.

On April 9, 1862, young Gracy and 13-year-old John H. Stockman set out on foot to look for missing horses belonging to the Gracy family. Stockman and Gracy were on foot, walking some distance apart. Stockman was witness to about fifteen Indians driving a herd of horses nearer to Gracy. When the Indians noticed the boy, Stockman reports that they quickly surrounded him, tore off his clothes and scalped him. They gestured for him to start running, and when Gracy did so, the Indians shot him to death with arrows.

Stockman was spotted by the Indians but was able to retreat to a nearby buggy driven by an Austin man named Jim Baker, his wife Ellen Baker, their infant daughter Olga Baker, and Mrs. Baker's elderly father. Mr. Baker was wounded by the attacking Indians, but Mrs. Baker and her father were able to retreat to a wooded area and use firearms to hold off the remaining Indians while Stockman ran for help.

Stockman ran to the residence of a nearby rancher who set out for Lampasas to get help. The rancher encountered a group of four hunters. The men returned to the fight scene and followed the scrape marks left by the buggy to the scene of the standoff. When they got there, Mrs. Baker was still holding the Indians at bay. Seeing the reinforcements, the Indians took the horses and left.

Later that day, guided by Stockman, the men tried to locate Gracy's body, but they could not locate the slain body and made camp. The following morning, they found Gracy nearby, among a scattering of white rocks.

The men returned the boy's body to his parents, who buried him in Lampasas behind the hotel. After the Lampasas Oak Hill Cemetery opened, Gracy's body was exhumed and reburied there by his parents.

On his tombstone, in addition to his name, birthday and date of death, is this text – "killed & skelped by Indians."
