= Happy Little Submarine Magic Box of Time =

- 潜艇总动员5：时光宝盒
- Directed by: He Zili
- Release date: May 29, 2015
- Running time: 80 minutes
- Country: China
- Language: Mandarin
- Box office: CN¥26 million

Happy Little Submarine Magic Box of Time (Chinese: 潜艇总动员5：时光宝盒) is a 2015 Chinese animated adventure film directed by He Zili. It was released in China on May 29, 2015.

== Voice cast ==
- Fan Churong
- Hong Haitian
- Xie Yuanzhen
- Wang Yanhua
- Tan ManTang
- Li Ye

== Box office ==
By June 1, 2015, the film had earned CN¥26.04 million at the Chinese box office.

== See also ==
- Happy Little Submarines 4: Adventure of Octopus (2014)
