= Phil Goldstone =

Polish-American film producer and director

- Born: February 22, 1893; Poland
- Died: June 19, 1963 (aged 70); Los Angeles, United States
- Occupations: Producer, Director
- Years active: 1921-1942 (film)

Phil Goldstone (February 22, 1893 – June 19, 1963) was a Polish-born American film producer and director. He was also a real estate developer in Palm Springs. Goldstone was involved with low-budget Poverty Row companies such as Majestic Pictures.

== Selected filmography ==
=== Director ===
- A Western Adventurer (1921)
- Montana Bill (1921)
- Once and Forever (1927)
- Backstage (1927)
- The Girl from Gay Paree (1927)
- Snowbound (1927)
- Wild Geese (1927)
- The Sin of Nora Moran (1933)
- Damaged Goods (1937)

=== Producer ===
- The Firebrand (1922)
- Deserted at the Altar (1922)
- The Cub Reporter (1922)
- Wildcat Jordan (1922)
- Lucky Dan (1922)
- His Last Race (1923)
- The White Panther (1923)
- Danger Ahead (1923)
- Her Man (1924)
- The Sword of Valor (1924)
- The Other Kind of Love (1924)
- The Virgin (1924)
- The Cowboy and the Flapper (1924)
- Fighter's Paradise (1924)
- Marry in Haste (1924)
- The Torrent (1924)
- Do It Now (1924)
- The Martyr Sex (1924)
- Soiled (1925)
- The Silent Guardian (1925)
- The Wild Girl (1925)
- Three in Exile (1925)
- Brand of Cowardice (1925)
- Pals (1925)
- The Reckless Sex (1925)
- Lost at Sea (1926)
- The Medicine Man (1930)
- Murder at Midnight (1931)
- The Pocatello Kid (1931)
- Arizona Terror (1931)
- The Drums of Jeopardy (1931)
- Two Gun Man (1931)
- Alias – the Bad Man (1931)
- The Single Sin (1931)
- Caught Cheating (1931)
- Morals for Women (1931)
- Hell Fire Austin (1932)
- White Zombie (1932)
- Whistlin' Dan (1932)
- The Crusader (1932)
- The World Gone Mad (1933)
- Sing Sinner Sing (1933)
- The Vampire Bat (1933)
- What Price Decency (1933)
- Curtain at Eight (1933)
- Unknown Blonde (1934)
- O'Shaughnessy's Boy (1935)
- Last of the Pagans (1935)
- Woman Wanted (1935)
- Age of Indiscretion (1935)
- Yukon Flight (1940)
- Sky Bandits (1940)

== Bibliography ==
- Michael R. Pitts. Poverty Row Studios, 1929–1940: An Illustrated History of 55 Independent Film Companies, with a Filmography for Each. McFarland & Company, 2005.
