= Renfrew of the Royal Mounted (1937 film) =

1937 film by Albert Herman

- Theatrical release poster
- Directed by: Albert Herman
- Screenplay by: Charles Logue
- Story by: Laurie York Erskine
- Produced by: Albert Herman
- Starring: James Newill; Carol Hughes; William Royle
- Cinematography: Francis Corby
- Edited by: Holbrook N. Todd
- Music by: Arthur Kay
- Production company: Criterion Pictures Corp.
- Distributed by: Grand National Pictures
- Release date: September 29, 1937 (USA)
- Running time: 57 minutes
- Country: United States
- Language: English

Renfrew of the Royal Mounted is a 1937 American film produced and directed by Albert Herman and starring James Newill, Carol Hughes, and William Royle. Released by Grand National Pictures, it is the first of eight films based on Renfrew of the Royal Mounted, a popular series of boy's adventure books written by Laurie York Erskine. The film was shot on location at Big Bear Lake, California.

With the CBS radio serial heard daily, Grand National Studios, Inc., also known as Grand National Pictures, sought interest in a series of Renfrew of the Mounted movies. Hired to play the role was James Newill, who had recently been a weekly singer on the George Burns and Gracie Allen radio program. The first of what would become eight motion-pictures, was released theatrically in September 1937. Following completion of the first film, Grand National Pictures filed for bankruptcy. Under reorganizing proceedings, the entire business entity was assigned to the Criterion Pictures Corporation, under ownership of Phil Goldstone. Under Criterion, a new contract was agreed and signed by Douglas Storer and Laurie York Erskine for a total of four movies, which would have totaled five when the contract was completed. The studio heads forgot about the four-movie limit and produced five. After an exchange of letters between Douglas Storer and Goldstone at Criterion, it was agreed that the company could continue to produce additional movies under the same financial arrangement. Following completion of the eight movies, Criterion sold their business entity to Monogram Studios, who later re-released some of the movies for additional box office revenue.

== Plot ==
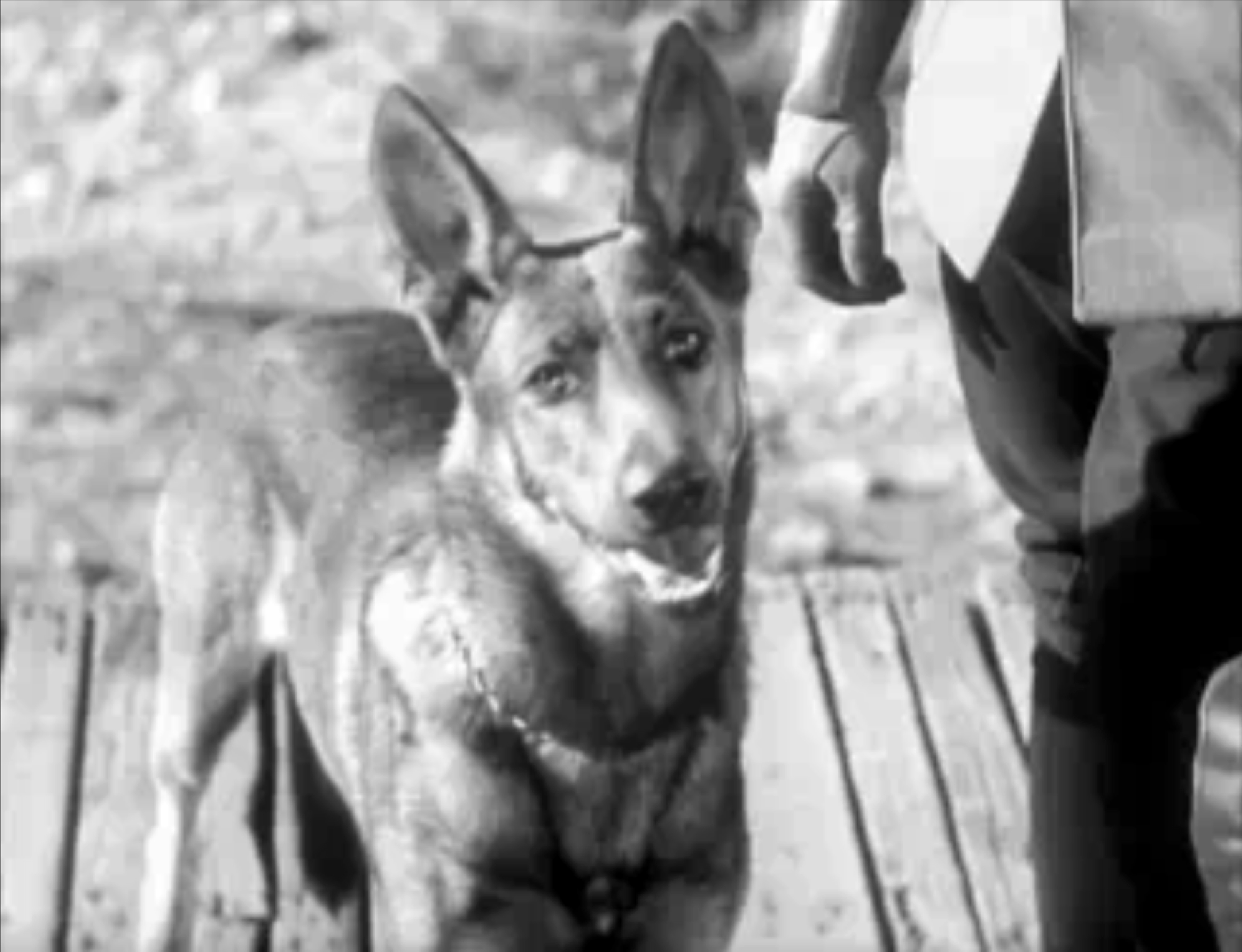
Canine actor Lightning in Renfrew of the Royal Mounted

In the summer of 1937, a dangerous gang of counterfeiters are transporting illegal money from the United States into Canada. The money is concealed inside frozen trout. The Royal Canadian Mounted Police assures the United States Treasury officials that they will cooperate fully in helping to apprehend the criminals. RCMP Constable MacDonald is sent out to assist in the investigation. While riding near Deer Lake, he sees a suspicious Indian rowing a canoe. When he calls to him, the Indian flees into the woods. MacDonald investigates the strange block of ice left behind and soon discovers the counterfeit money hidden inside the frozen trout. The Indian Pierre, who works for the counterfeiters, sees what has happened and kills MacDonald with a deadly throw of a knife.

Meanwhile, RCMP Sergeant Renfrew (James Newill) arrives with his men at the Deer River Annual Picnic where he competes against the Greek owner of the Totem Pole Lodge George Poulis (William Royle) to see who makes the best barbecue sauce. Renfrew meets nineteen-year-old American Virginia Bronson (Carol Hughes) and invites her to join the picnic festivities and barbecue. Their fun is interrupted by news of the killing of Constable MacDonald. Later Inspector Newcomb challenges his men to do everything they can to bring the killers to justice. That night Renfrew comforts MacDonald's grieving family, especially his son Tommy (Dickie Jones).

At the Deer River Hotel, Virginia returns to her room and finds Pierre, who gives her a note from her father asking that she meet him at the Totem Pole Lodge. Unknown to her, Virginia's father was tricked into coming to the lodge, which is being used as a center of operations for the counterfeiters, to provide new counterfeit plates for the gang. Bronson, who was once a counterfeiter, just returned from serving a five-year sentence in prison. The next day, while Virginia and Pierre are rowing to the lodge by canoe, the Indian spots Renfrew following them. When he reaches for his rifle, Virginia struggles to take away the gun and the two end up in the water. Renfrew jumps in after them and is able to rescue Virginia, but Pierre manages to escape.

While they dry off around a campfire, Renfrew and Virginia get to know each other. While attracted to the Mountie, Virginia discovers her father's picture in his possession and does not mention that he is staying at the Totem Pole Lodge. Later that night while Renfrew is asleep, Pierre shows up and Virginia sneaks away with him to the lodge. Meanwhile, her father is being forced to complete a set of counterfeit plates. He finally meets the head of the counterfeit gang—the Greek lodge owner, George Poulis.

Meanwhile, Pierre and Virginia make their way slowly to the lodge. On the road they're met by two of Poulis' thugs, and Virginia tells them they are being pursued by an officer named Renfrew. Shortly thereafter, the two thugs encounter Renfrew and try to kill him, but the Mountie and his trusted dog Lightning are able to disarm the criminals and arrest them. When Renfrew examines their new counterfeit bills, he discovers a secret message from Bronson etched in the bill's design indicating that he is being held prisoner at the Totem Pole Lodge.

Soon after, Renfrew obtains an aircraft, flies over the Totem Pole Lodge, and parachutes down to the lodge property. Poulis is surprised to see his "friend" and offers him a room. Later when Renfrew sees suspicious men loading up a car with blocks of ice, he chases after them on motorcycle. When the car crashes, the Mountie discovers the frozen trout filled with counterfeit bills. Back at the lodge, Renfrew and Poulis finally confront each other, and in the ensuing gunfight, Poulis is shot and taken under arrest.

That night on moonlit Deer Lake, Renfrew serenades Virginia in a canoe while his trusted dog Lightning looks on.

== Cast ==
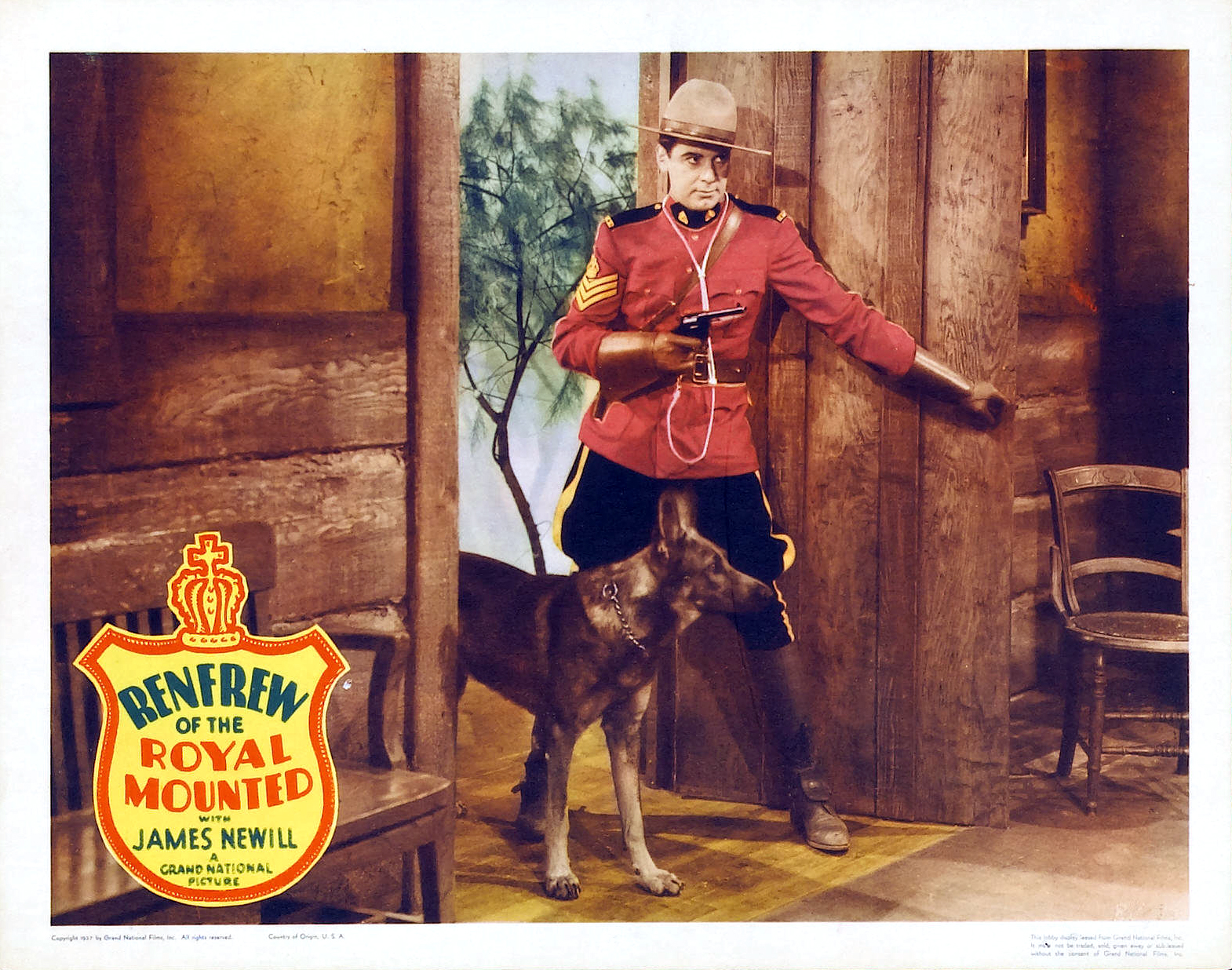
Renfrew of the Royal Mounted and his dog Lightning

- James Newill as Sergeant Renfrew
- Carol Hughes as Virginia Bronson
- William Royle as George Poulis
- Herbert Corthell as Mr. Bronson
- Kenneth Harlan as "Angel" Carroll
- Dickie Jones as Tommy Mac Donald
- Chief Thundercloud as Pierre
- William Austin as Constable Holly
- Donald Reed as Sergeant MacDonald
- Lightning as Renfrew's dog Lightning

== Soundtrack ==
- "Tale of Love" (Written by Betty Laidlaw and Robert Lively)
- "Barbecue Bill Was a Mountie" (Written by Betty Laidlaw and Robert Lively)
- "Little Son" (Written by Betty Laidlaw and Robert Lively)
- "We're Mounted Men" (Written by Betty Laidlaw and Robert Lively)
