= Danger Ahead (1940 film) =

1940 film by Ralph Staub

- Theatrical release poster
- Directed by: Ralph Staub
- Screenplay by: Edward Halperin
- Based on: Renfrew's Long Trail by Laurie York Erskine
- Produced by: Philip N. Krasne
- Starring: James Newill; Dorothea Kent; Guy Usher; Maude Allen; John Dilson; Al Shaw
- Cinematography: Mack Stengler
- Edited by: Martin G. Cohn
- Production company: Criterion Pictures
- Distributed by: Monogram Pictures
- Release date: January 22, 1940
- Running time: 60 minutes
- Country: United States
- Language: English

Danger Ahead is a 1940 American adventure film directed by Ralph Staub and written by Edward Halperin. It is based on the 1933 novel Renfrew's Long Trail by Laurie York Erskine. The film stars James Newill, Dorothea Kent, Guy Usher, Maude Allen, John Dilson and Al Shaw. The film was released on January 22, 1940, by Monogram Pictures.

== Plot ==
Dorothea Kent played the romantic interest as the commander’s daughter, Genevieve, who studied criminology in college and is determined to help Renfrew solve the case, much to his disgust. When one of the Maxwell Company’s armored cars disappear with a gold shipment, the missing driver, Bob Hill, is suspected of theft. In actuality, Maxwell and his henchmen had poured acid on the truck’s brake lines, causing the vehicle to crash into a mountain lake. Genevieve theorizes that Maxwell and Hatch, the bank president, are involved in the caper. When Sergeant Renfrew discovers a trail of clues leading to Maxwell, he and Corporal Kelly are almost killed by a runaway truck. The next day, the two Mounties dive into the lake where they find the missing truck and the driver’s body — along with no gold. When Renfrew appears at the garage to arrest Maxwell, the villain and his men speed away in an armored truck... but the air brake collapses, which results in the gang meeting the same fate as the first driver. Renfrew then discovers that Genevieve had locked Hatch in a vault, believing him to be working with the gang. After releasing Hatch, Renfrew makes Genevieve promise never to play detective again.

== Cast ==
- James Newill as Sgt. Renfrew
- Dorothea Kent as Genevieve
- Guy Usher as Inspector
- Maude Allen as Mrs. Hill
- John Dilson as Thomas Hatch
- Al Shaw as Johnny Yergerson
- Dave O'Brien as Corporal Kelly
- Dick Rich as Maxwell
- Harry Depp as Jones
- Bob Terry as Gimpy
- Lester Dorr as Lefty
- Earl Douglas as Eggface
