= Sky Bandits (1940 film) =

1940 film

- Film poster
- Directed by: Ralph Staub
- Written by: Edward Halperin (screenplay)
- Based on: Renfrew Rides the Sky (novel) by Laurie York Erskine
- Produced by: Phil Goldstone
- Starring: James Newill; Louise Stanley; Dewey Robinson; William Pawley
- Cinematography: Mack Stengler
- Edited by: Martin G. Cohn
- Music by: Betty Laidlaw; Robert Lively; Lew Porter; Johnny Lange
- Production company: Criterion Pictures Corp.
- Distributed by: Monogram Pictures
- Release date: July 7, 1940
- Running time: 62 minutes
- Country: United States
- Language: English

Sky Bandits, also known as Renfrew of the Royal Mounted in Sky Bandits, is a 1940 American action film directed by Ralph Staub and released by Monogram Pictures, starring James Newill, Louise Stanley, Dewey Robinson and William Pawley. The film is a remake of the film Ghost Patrol (1936) with a musical/action formula, similar to the format of the "singing cowboy" films of the era.

== Plot ==
Sergeant Renfrew (James Newill) of the Royal Canadian Mounted Police and Constable Kelly (Dave O'Brien) fly in search of a missing aircraft flown by Buzz Murphy (Eddie Featherston). Murphy was carrying a shipment of gold from the Yukon Mine Company. Local radio announcer Uncle Dimwittie (Dewey Robinson), has bugged the mine office, and is secretly transmitting information about gold shipments, in the guise of reading children's stories on the air.

The messages are picked up by a gang led by a crook named Morgan (William Pawley). They have forced Professor Lewis (Joe De Stefani) to work on a powerful ray gun invented by a scientist named Speavy (Dwight Frye). The radio beam the weapon sends out disables aircraft engines. Speavy is worried that his invention is being used by the crooks, and tries to warn Renfrew, but the scientist is killed by Morgan.

Madeleine (Louise Stanley), the daughter of Professor Lewis, tries to help Renfrew who finds a laboratory that Morgan is operating but it is destroyed. When no one on the force believes he has discovered the secret of the lost aircraft, Renfrew volunteers to fly the next gold shipment. Madeleine stows away on board the aircraft Renfrew is piloting. Morgan and his gang are also in the air, and while the professor can bring down Renfrew with the ray gun, but he turns it, instead on Morgan's aircraft. Constable Kelly then rides to Morgan's hideout and, with the professor's help, arrests the rest of the gang.

== Cast ==
- James Newill as Sgt. Renfrew
- Louise Stanley as Madeleine Lewis
- Dewey Robinson as Uncle Dinwiddie
- William Pawley as Morgan
- Joe De Stefani as Professor Burton Lewis
- Jim Farley as Inspector Warner, RCMP
- Dave O'Brien as Constable Kelly
- Karl Hackett as Hawthorne
- Ted Adams as Henchman Gary
- Dwight Frye as Speavy
- Jack Clifford as Whispering Smith
- Bob Terry as Henchman Hutchins
- Kenne Duncan as Henchman Brownie
- Eddie Featherston as Pilot Buzz Murphy

== Production ==
Sky Bandits was the last of eight films to feature James Newill in the role of Sergeant Douglas Renfrew. The fictional character appeared in print in 1921 and would spawn a series of ten novels. Phil Goldstone of Criterion Pictures produced the film, released theatrically in April 1940, and would later be re-released for additional box office by Monogram Studios. Some of the scenes were filmed on location at Big Bear Lake, California, standing in for the Yukon. Sky Bandits was not the last time James Newill and Dave O'Brien would work together. Two years later they signed with Alexander Stern Productions for a series of Westerns known as the Texas Rangers, released through PRC Studios. In 1951, this movie would be edited into a 25-minute television episode for a weekly Renfrew of the Mounted series, with James Newill reprising his role for newly-filmed opening and closing.

== Soundtrack ==
- James Newill - "Mounted Men" (Written by Betty Laidlaw and Robert Lively)
- James Newill - "Lady in the Clouds" (Written by Betty Laidlaw and Robert Lively)
- James Newill - "Alley-Oop" (Written by Betty Laidlaw and Robert Lively)

== Reception ==
Sky Bandits was not reviewed in trade sources.
