= Laurie York Erskine =

American novelist

Laurie York Erskine (23 June 1894 – 30 November 1976) was a popular boys adventure author, educator, and co-founder of the Solebury School in New Hope, Pennsylvania, United States.

== Biography ==
Erskine was born in Kirkcudbright, Scotland, to actors Wallace Erskine and Ada Margery Bonney Erskine. The family travelled to the United States in 1901, where both parents appeared in silent films.

In 1916 Laurie Erskine was commissioned in the Royal Flying Corps, where he served in France. Following his demobilisation, Erskine was an editorial writer with the Detroit News from 1921 to 1922, until he began writing stories for boys in 1921. His most famous work was a series of books featuring Renfrew of the Royal Mounted that later became a radio, film, and television series with Erskine himself narrating the radio show. Erskine also created and narrated the radio program "Adventure Stories".

Erskine was a staff writer with the Battle Creek, Michigan Enquirer newspaper. In 1925 he was one of the four organisers of the Solebury School for Boys in New Hope, Pennsylvania.

At the start of World War II, Erskine was commissioned in the Army of the United States Coast Artillery, eventually becoming a major in the 38th Anti-Aircraft Brigade from 1944 to 1945. He was awarded the Bronze Star and was discharged in 1946. During his Army service, Erskine wrote the texts for the United States Armed Forces Institute course for American citizenship. Erskine's writing subsided as he channeled his energy into developing the Solebury Method for Teaching Composition. His name lives on as a literary prize for students at Solebury School.

== Bibliography ==
1920 The River Trail: Romance of the Royal Mounted. London: Hodder & Stoughton.
1922 Renfrew of the Royal Mounted. New York: Appleton-Century.
1923 The Boy Who Went. Philadelphia: The Penn Publishing Company
1924 The Laughing Rider. New York: D. Appleton and Company.
1925 Valor of the Range. New York: D. Appleton and Company.
1925 The Confidence Man. New York: D. Appleton and Company.
1926 The Coming of Cosgrove. New York: D. Appleton and Company.
1927 Renfrew Rides Again. New York: D. Appleton and Company.
1928 Renfrew Rides the Sky. New York: D. Appleton and Company.
1928 Power of the Hills. New York: D. Appleton and Company.
1929 Fine Fellows. New York, London: D. Appleton and Company.
1929 After School: a Story of Patriotism. New York: D. Appleton and Company.
1930 Comrades of the Clouds. D. Appleton and Company.
1931 Renfrew Rides North. New York: Grosset.
1933 Renfrew's Long Trail. New York: Grosset & Dunlap.
1935 Renfrew Rides the Range. New York: D. Appleton-Century company, Incorporated.
1936 Renfrew in the Valley of Vanished Men. New York: D. Appleton-Century Co., Incorporated.
1939 One Man Came Back. New York: D. Appleton-Century.
1940 Valley of Wolves. New York: D. Appleton-Century.
1941 Renfrew Flies Again. New York: D. Appleton-Century.
1941 Renfrew Rides the Range New York: D. Appleton-Century
