= Rolling Down the Great Divide =

1942 film directed by Sam Newfield

- Theatrical release poster
- Directed by: Sam Newfield
- Screenplay by: Milton Raison
- Produced by: Sigmund Neufeld
- Starring: Bill Boyd; Art Davis; Lee Powell; Wanda McKay; Glenn Strange; Karl Hackett
- Cinematography: Jack Greenhalgh
- Edited by: Holbrook N. Todd
- Music by: Johnny Lange; Lew Porter
- Production company: Producers Releasing Corporation
- Distributed by: Producers Releasing Corporation
- Release date: April 24, 1942
- Running time: 59 minutes
- Country: United States
- Language: English

Rolling Down the Great Divide is a 1942 American Western film directed by Sam Newfield, written by Milton Raison, and starring Bill Boyd, Art Davis, Lee Powell, Wanda McKay, Glenn Strange and Karl Hackett. It was released on April 24, 1942, by Producers Releasing Corporation.

== Cast ==
- Bill Boyd as Marshal Bill Boyd
- Art Davis as Marshal Art Davis
- Lee Powell as Marshal Lee Powell
- Wanda McKay as Rita
- Glenn Strange as Joe Duncan
- Karl Hackett as Pete
- Jack Holmes as Sheriff Snowden
- Ted Adams as Roger Martin
- Jack Ingram as Hank Dale
- John Elliott as Lem Bartlett
