= Raiders of the West =

1942 film by Sam Newfield

- Theatrical release poster
- Directed by: Sam Newfield
- Screenplay by: Oliver Drake
- Produced by: Sigmund Neufeld
- Starring: Bill Boyd; Art Davis; Lee Powell; Virginia Carroll; Charles King; Glenn Strange
- Cinematography: Jack Greenhalgh
- Edited by: Holbrook N. Todd
- Production company: Sigmund Neufeld Productions
- Distributed by: Producers Releasing Corporation
- Release date: February 20, 1942
- Running time: 64 minutes
- Country: United States
- Language: English

Raiders of the West is a 1942 American Western film directed by Sam Newfield and written by Oliver Drake. The film stars Bill Boyd, Art Davis, Lee Powell, Virginia Carroll, Charles King and Glenn Strange. The film was released on February 20, 1942, by Producers Releasing Corporation.

== Cast ==
- Bill Boyd as Bill Boyd
- Art Davis as Art Davis
- Lee Powell as Lee Powell
- Virginia Carroll as Lola Andre
- Charles King as Duke Mallory
- Glenn Strange as Hank Reynolds
- Rex Lease as Pete
- Slim Whitaker as Sheriff
- Milton Kibbee as Justice
- Lynton Brent as Morton
- Dale Sherwood as Blanche
