= Along the Sundown Trail =

1942 film

- Theatrical release poster
- Directed by: Sam Newfield
- Screenplay by: Arthur St. Claire
- Produced by: Sigmund Neufeld
- Starring: Bill Boyd; Art Davis; Lee Powell; Julie Duncan; Charles King; Jack Ingram
- Cinematography: Jack Greenhalgh
- Edited by: Holbrook N. Todd
- Production company: Sigmund Neufeld Productions
- Distributed by: Producers Releasing Corporation
- Release date: October 10, 1942
- Running time: 57 minutes
- Country: United States
- Language: English

Along the Sundown Trail is a 1942 American Western film directed by Sam Newfield and written by Arthur St. Claire. The film stars Bill Boyd, Art Davis, Lee Powell, Julie Duncan, Charles King and Jack Ingram. The film was released on October 10, 1942, by Producers Releasing Corporation.

== Cast ==
- Bill Boyd as Bill Boyd
- Art Davis as Art Davis
- Lee Powell as Lee Powell
- Julie Duncan as Susan Lawrence
- Charles King as Big Ben Salter
- Jack Ingram as Bart Fleming
- Karl Hackett as Pop Lawrence
- John Merton as Jake Phillips
- Howard Masters as Joe Lawrence
- Kermit Maynard as Curly Morgan
