= Call of the Forest =

Call of the Forest may refer to:

- Call of the Forest (1965 film), an Austrian drama film
- Call of the Forest (1949 film), an American Western film
