= The Lone Ranger Rides Again =

1939 film serial directed by William Witney and John English

- Directed by: William Witney; John English
- Written by: Franklin Adreoon; Ronald Davidson; Gerald Geraghty; Barry Shipman; Sol shor Fran Striker (radio show); George W. Trendle (radio show)
- Produced by: Robert M. Beche
- Starring: Robert Livingston; Chief Thundercloud; Duncan Renaldo; Jinx Falken; Ralph Dunn; J. Farrell MacDonald
- Cinematography: Edgar Lyons; William Nobles
- Edited by: Helene Turner; Edward Todd
- Music by: William Lava
- Distributed by: Republic Pictures
- Release date: February 25, 1939
- Running time: 15 chapters (263 minutes)
- Country: United States
- Language: English
- Budget: $193,878 (negative cost: $213,997)

The Lone Ranger Rides Again is a 1939 American Republic serial. It was a sequel to Republic's 1938 serial The Lone Ranger, which had been highly successful, and the thirteenth of the sixty-six serials produced by Republic.

The serial was considered lost for a long time but copies, with Spanish subtitles, have since been found and re-issued.

== Plot ==
The Lone Ranger Rides Again follows the legendary masked hero The Lone Ranger and his loyal companion Tonto as they arrive in a troubled New Mexico valley to aid homesteaders under attack by a violent outlaw gang known as the Black Raiders. The Raiders, led by Bart Dolan, the son of wealthy rancher Craig Dolan, aim to drive out the settlers and maintain control of the land for their own benefit. Craig remains unaware of his son's criminal activities and believes the homesteaders are causing the unrest.

The Lone Ranger and Tonto investigate the situation, but their efforts are complicated when the Black Raiders frame the Lone Ranger for their crimes, including theft, arson, and murder. Public opinion begins to turn against him, and tensions rise among the settlers. Among those misled by the Raiders' deception is Juan Vasquez, a local rancher who blames the Lone Ranger for his brother's death.

To clear his name and continue his mission, the Lone Ranger adopts the alias Bill Andrews, allowing him to move among the settlers and outlaws without his iconic mask. Working alongside Tonto, he uncovers the true scope of the Raiders' operations and begins dismantling their plans one by one. Along the way, Vasquez learns the truth about his brother's death and joins forces with the Lone Ranger and Tonto.

The conflict escalates as Bart Dolan grows more desperate to maintain control of the valley. The Lone Ranger and Tonto narrowly escape several ambushes and traps set by the Black Raiders, including shootouts, staged accidents, and sabotage. Despite these challenges, they persist in rallying the homesteaders and exposing Bart's treachery.

In the final confrontation, the Lone Ranger faces Bart Dolan directly. With the help of Tonto and the settlers, the Raiders are defeated, and Bart is brought to justice. Craig Dolan, devastated by his son's actions, vows to make amends with the homesteaders, ensuring a peaceful resolution to the conflict.

With the valley restored to peace and justice served, the Lone Ranger and Tonto ride off into the horizon, continuing their mission to protect the innocent and uphold the law.

== Cast ==
Main cast

- Robert Livingston as The Lone Ranger and undercover as homesteader Bill Andrews. Avoiding the deliberate mystery of the radio show and the gradual revelation of the first serial, the Lone Ranger is clearly revealed as Bill Andrews from the start. Livingston replaced Lee Powell from the first serial.
- Chief Thundercloud as Tonto, the Lone Ranger's sidekick
- Silver Chief as Silver, the Lone Ranger's horse. Silver Chief replaced Silver King, the horse in the original serial.
- Duncan Renaldo as Juan Vasquez, who originally believes the Lone Ranger killed his brother
- Jinx Falken as Sue Dolan
- Ralph Dunn as Bart Dolan, Craig Dolan's son, the villain and leader of the Black Raiders
- J. Farrell MacDonald as Craig Dolan

Supporting cast

- William Gould as Jed Scott
- Rex Lease as Evans
- Ted Mapes as Merritt, a settler
- Henry Otho as Pa Daniels
- John Beach as Hardin, one of the Black Raiders
- Glenn Strange as Thorne, one of the Black Raiders
- Stanley Blystone as Murdock, one of the Black Raiders
- Eddie Parker as Hank, one of the Black Raiders
- Al Taylor as Colt, one of the Black Raiders
- Carlton Young as Logan
- Forrest Taylor (uncredited) as Judge Miller

Additional cast

- Billy Bletcher as the (uncredited) voice of The Lone Ranger. Bletcher also voiced the Ranger in the previous serial.

== Production ==
The Lone Ranger Rides Again was budgeted at $193,878 although the final negative cost was $213,997 (a $20,119, or 10.4%, overspend). It was the most expensive Republic serial of 1939 and the second most expensive of all Republic serials after Captain America (1944, $222,906), just beating Secret Service in Darkest Africa (1943, $210,033).

The studio was willing to spend so much on this serial because the previous Lone Ranger serial had been a major success and was making a profit after only a few months on release.

It was filmed between 9 December 1938 and 20 January 1939 under the working title The Lone Ranger Returns. The serial's production number was 895.

Director William Witney did not believe the script was as good as the original The Lone Ranger, but for the first time the directors insisted on being part of the casting process for this serial.

=== Stunts ===
- Yakima Canutt
- Tommy Coats
- George DeNormand
- Ted Mapes
- Eddie Parker
- Post Park
- David Sharpe
- Ted Wells
- Bud Wolfe
- Bill Yrigoyen
- Joe Yrigoyen

== Release ==
=== Theatrical ===
The Lone Ranger Rides Again's official release date is 25 February 1939, although this is actually the date the seventh chapter was made available to film exchanges.

== Chapter titles ==
Sources:

1. The Lone Ranger Returns (28 min 54s)
2. Masked Victory (16 min 43s)
3. The Black Raiders Strike (16 min 45s)
4. The Cavern of Doom (16 min 44s)
5. Agents of Deceit (16 min 37s)
6. The Trap (16 min 39s)
7. Lone Ranger at Bay (16 min 42s)
8. Ambush (16 min 40s)
9. Wheels of Doom (16 min 44s)
10. The Dangerous Captive (16 min 37
11. Death Below (16 min 40s)
12. Blazing Peril (16 min 41s) -- Re-Cap Chapter
13. Exposed (16 min 42s)
14. Besieged (16 min 39s)
15. Frontier Justice (16 min 45s)

== See also ==
- List of film serials
- List of film serials by studio

Preceded by Hawk of the Wilderness (1938)	Republic Serial; The Lone Ranger Rides Again (1939)	Succeeded by Daredevils of the Red Circle (1939)
Preceded by Hawk of the Wilderness (1938)	Witney-English Serial; The Lone Ranger Rides Again (1939)	Succeeded by Daredevils of the Red Circle (1939)
