= Romance of the West =

Romance of the West may refer to:

- Romance of the West (1930 film), American western film
- Romance of the West (1935 film), American western short film by Ralph Staub for Vitaphone Broadway Brevities
- Romance of the West (1946 film), American western film
