= King of the Stallions =

1942 American western film

- Directed by: Edward Finney
- Screenplay by: Arthur St. Claire; Sherman L. Lowe
- Produced by: Edward Finney
- Starring: Chief Thundercloud; Rick Vallin; Barbara Felker; Dave O'Brien; Chief Yowlachie; Sally Cairns
- Cinematography: Marcel Le Picard
- Edited by: Fred Bain
- Music by: Frank Sanucci
- Production company: Edward F. Finney Productions
- Distributed by: Monogram Pictures
- Release date: September 18, 1942
- Running time: 63 minutes
- Country: United States
- Language: English

King of the Stallions is a 1942 American Western film directed by Edward Finney and written by Arthur St. Claire and Sherman L. Lowe. The film stars Chief Thundercloud, Rick Vallin, Barbara Felker, Dave O'Brien, Chief Yowlachie and Sally Cairns. The film was released on September 18, 1942, by Monogram Pictures.

== Plot ==
Nakoma is the leader of a pack of wild horses. Both Indians and cowboys want the horse in their side, however Nakoma is not friendly to either one.

== Cast ==
- Chief Thundercloud as Hahawi
- Rick Vallin as Sina-Oga
- Barbara Felker as Princess Telenika
- Dave O'Brien as Steve Mason
- Chief Yowlachie as Chief Matapotan
- Sally Cairns as Lucy Clark
- Ted Adams as Jake Barlow
- Gordon De Main as Pop Clark
- Forrest Taylor as Nick Henshaw
- J.W. Cody as Manka
