= The Fighting Devil Dogs =

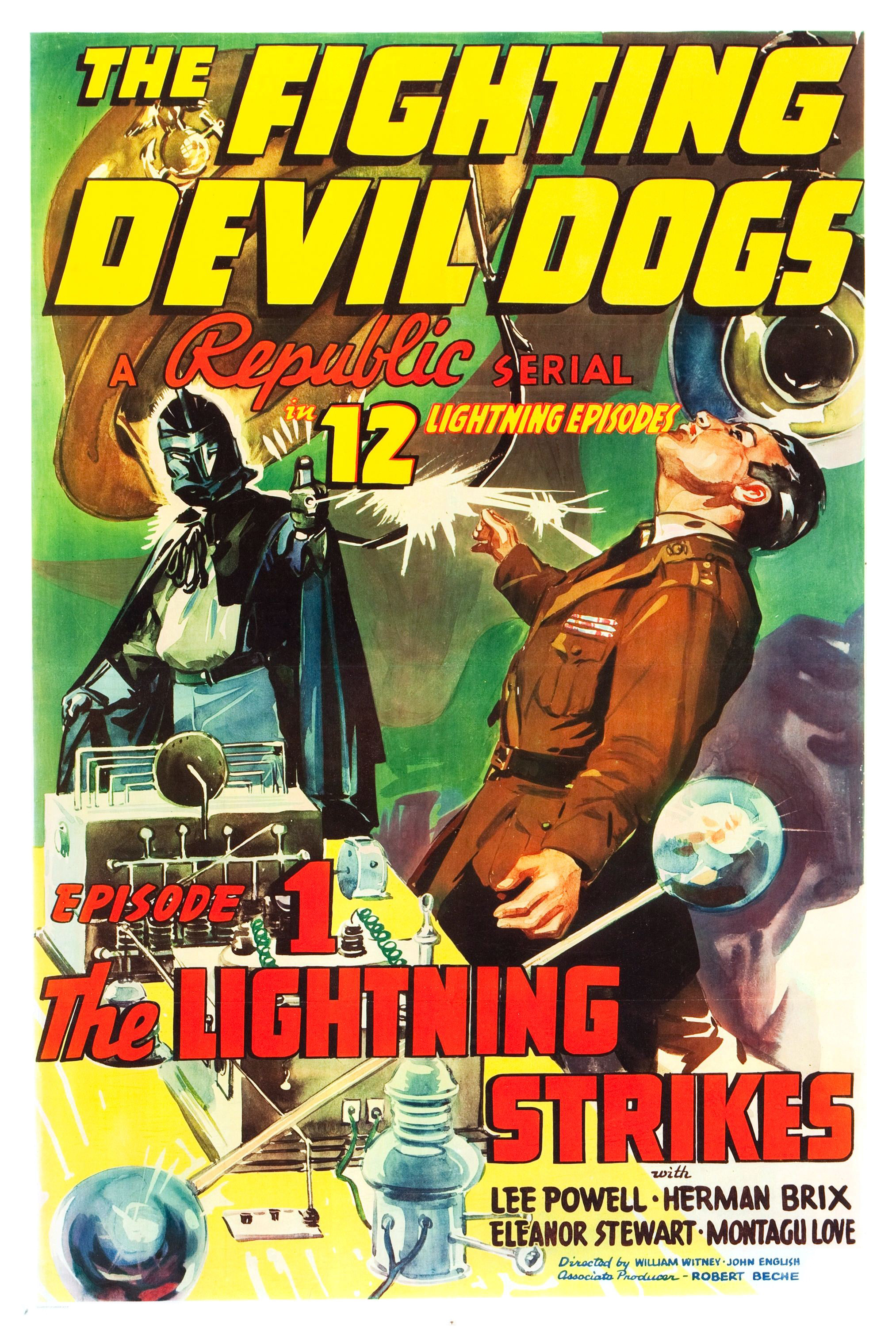
- Directed by: William Witney; John English
- Written by: Franklin Adreon; Ronald Davidson; Barry Shipman; Sol Shor
- Produced by: Robert M. Beche
- Starring: Lee Powell; Herman Brix; Eleanor Stewart; Montagu Love; Hugh Sothern; Sam Flint; Perry Ivins; Forrest Taylor; John Picorri
- Cinematography: William Nobles
- Music by: Alberto Colombo
- Distributed by: Republic Pictures
- Release dates: May 28, 1938 (Serial); January 29, 1943 (feature); 1950 (TV); 1966 (TV movie)
- Running time: 12 chapters / 204 minutes (serial); 69 minutes (feature); 6 26½-minute episodes (TV); 100 minutes (TV movie)
- Country: United States
- Language: English
- Budget: $94,656 (negative cost: $92,569)

The Fighting Devil Dogs (1938) is a 12-chapter Republic movie serial starring Lee Powell and Herman Brix, the latter better known by his later stage name, Bruce Bennett. It was directed by William Witney and John English. While not often considered a great serial, as it contains much stock footage and two recap chapters, it is famous for its main villain, the Lightning—the first costumed supervillain. There is some speculation that George Lucas used the Lightning as a template for Darth Vader.

The serial has a mixture of science fiction and futuristic military adventure elements.

== Plot ==
In Singapore, two Marine Lieutenants, Tom Grayson and Frank Corby, uncover the threat of a masked terrorist called the Lightning, who uses an arsenal of powerful lightning-based weaponry in his bid for world conquest. However, the battle becomes personal when the Lightning annihilates the officers' unit and later kills Lt. Grayson's father as he was helping the investigation of the weapon. Now, the marines have dedicated themselves to stopping the Lightning and bringing him to justice.

== Cast ==
- Lee Powell as Lt Tom Grayson
- Herman Brix as Lt Frank Corby
- Eleanor Stewart as Janet Warfield
- Montagu Love as General White
- Hugh Sothern as Ben Warfield
- Sam Flint as Col Grayson
- Perry Ivins as Crenshaw
- Forrest Taylor as Benson
- John Picorri as Prof Gould
- Lester Dorr as the costumed character of The Lightning (uncredited)

== Production ==
The Fighting Devil Dogs was budgeted at $94,656 although the final negative cost was $92,569 (a $2,087, or 2.2%, under spend) making it one of only three pre-war Republic serials to be produced under budget. It was the cheapest Republic serial of 1938 and the second cheapest of all Republic serials. It has two recap chapters rather than the usual one (or sometimes none), in which the entire plot of the serial so far is repeated, and makes extensive use of stock footage. The cheapest Republic serial was The Vigilantes Are Coming (1936) at $87,655, while the next cheapest after The Fighting Devil Dogs is Undersea Kingdom (also 1936) at $99,222.

It was filmed between 10 March and 29 March 1938. The serial's production number was 793.

One of the directors, William Witney, believed this to be one of the worst of the serials he ever made.

The Lightning's Flying wing was taken from the earlier Dick Tracy serial. Aviation was one of the most popular serial genres of the early 1930s, along with Westerns and Jungle serials. Aviation films were even expected to displace Westerns as the most popular genre but science fiction took over instead. Writer Raymond William Stedman claims that the science fiction Flying Wing in this serial was the beginning of the process that killed interest in ordinary aviation.

== Release ==
=== Theatrical ===
The Fighting Devil Dogs' official release date is May 28, 1938, although this is actually the date the sixth chapter was made available to film exchanges.

A 69-minute feature film version, created by editing portions of the serial footage together, was released on January 29, 1943.

=== Television ===
In the early 1950s, The Fighting Devil Dogs was one of fourteen Republic serials edited to six 26½-minute episodes for TV syndication. Subsequently, it became one of twenty-six Republic serials edited into a TV-movie in 1966, each of which features ran 100 minutes. The title of this version was Torpedo of Doom.

== Critical reception ==
The Fighting Devil Dogs is, in Cline's opinion, one of the best mystery serials ever released, with a "colourful" mystery villain, "stirring" musical score and "magnificent" editing. He also notes that it is "apparently one of the least costly" serials ever released, with two recap chapters and stock footage taken from newsreels and earlier serial releases. He states that it should be included in "any list of the ten best sound serials of all."

== Chapter titles ==
1. The Lightning Strikes (29 min 28s)
2. The Mill of Disaster (15 min 56s)
3. The Silenced Witness (15 min 50s)
4. Cargo of Mystery (15 min 47s)
5. Undersea Bandits (16 min 17s)
6. The Torpedo of Doom (16 min 24s)
7. The Phantom Killer (14 min 47s) - Recap chapter
8. Tides of Trickery (14 min 34s)
9. Attack from the Skies (15 min 07s)
10. In the Camp of the Enemy (14 min 29s)
11. The Baited Trap (17 min 24s) - Recap chapter
12. Killer at Bay (17 min 39s)

_{Source:}

== See also ==
- List of film serials by year
- List of film serials by studio

Preceded by The Lone Ranger (1938)	Republic Serial; The Fighting Devil Dogs (1938)	Succeeded by Dick Tracy Returns (1938)
Preceded by The Lone Ranger (1938)	Witney-English Serial; The Fighting Devil Dogs (1938)	Succeeded by Dick Tracy Returns (1938)
