= Hi-Yo Silver =

1940 film directed by William Witney & John English

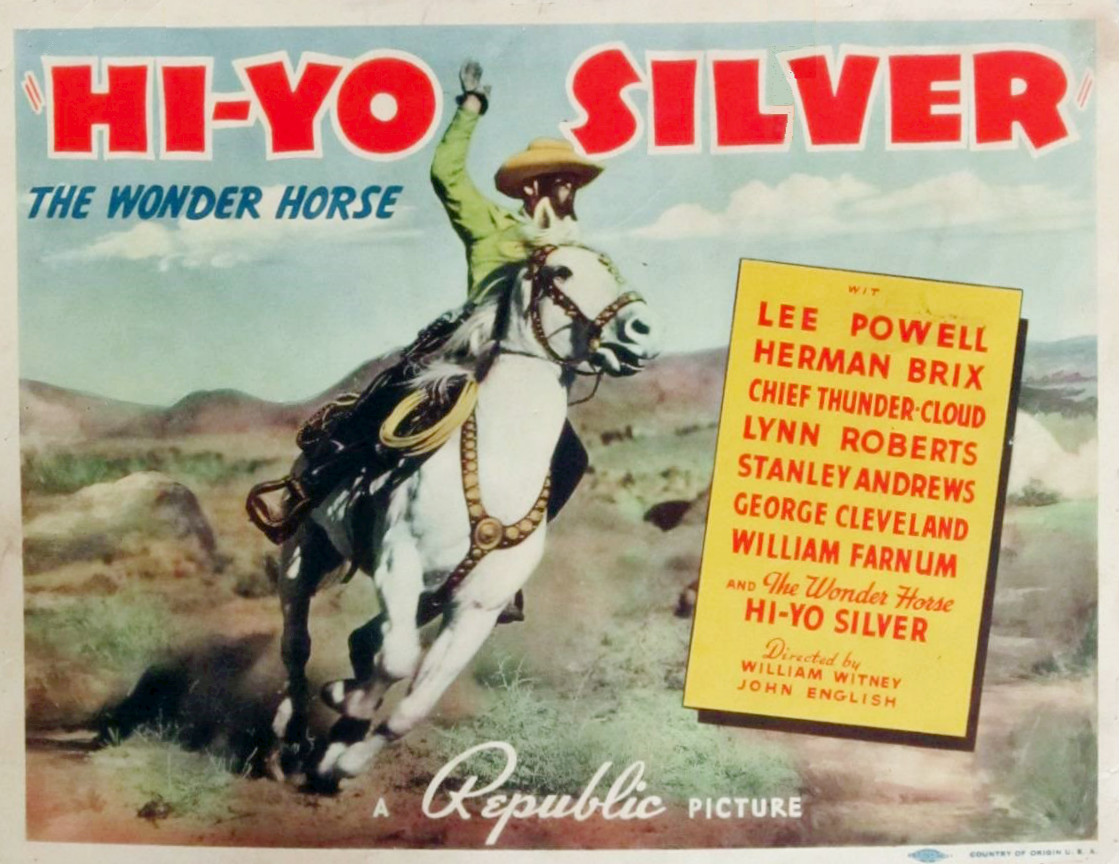
- Lobby card for the film
- Directed by: William Witney; John English
- Written by: George Worthing Yates; Barry Shipman; Franklyn Adreon; Ronald Davidson; Lois Eby
- Based on: The radio series, The Lone Ranger by: Fran Striker; George Trendle
- Produced by: Sol C. Siegel
- Starring: Lee Powell; Hi-Yo Silver; Chief Thundercloud
- Cinematography: William Nobles
- Edited by: Helene Turner; Edward Todd
- Music by: Alberto Colombo
- Production company: Republic Pictures
- Release date: April 10, 1940 (US)
- Running time: 69 minutes
- Country: United States
- Language: English

Hi-Yo Silver is a 1940 American Western film, directed by William Witney and John English. It stars Lee Powell and Chief Thundercloud and was released on April 10, 1940. The film was created by condensing the fifteen chapters of the 1938 film serial The Lone Ranger.

== Plot ==
This 1940 feature version of the 1938 serial shows the first live depiction of the Ranger. A rag-tag band of Confederate Army deserters led by Captain Mark Smith captures, then murders Colonel Marcus Jeffries after discovering that he's a newly appointed Commissioner of Finance sent by the U.S. Treasury Department to Texas to collect taxes. Smith then assumes Jeffries identity and over time sets into play his plan to conquer Texas and rule it as a dictator. The Texas Rangers sent to investigate are ambushed, but one survives. He is nursed back to health by Tonto and swears to avenge the massacre.

== Cast list ==
- Lee Powell as The Lone Ranger, aka Allen King
- Silver King as Silver
- Chief Thundercloud as Tonto
- Bruce Bennett as Bert Rogers (credited as Herman Brix)
- Lynne Roberts as Joan Blanchard
- Stanley Andrews as Jeffries
- George Cleveland as Blanchard
- William Farnum as Father McKim
- Hal Taliaferro as Bob Stuart
- Lane Chandler as Dick Forrest
