= Virginia Carroll =

American actress (1913–2009)

- Born: Virginia Evangeline Carroll; December 2, 1913; Los Angeles, California, U.S.
- Died: July 23, 2009 (aged 95); Santa Barbara, California, U.S.
- Resting place: Forest Lawn Memorial Park (Hollywood Hills)
- Years active: 1935–1965
- Spouse(s): Ralph Byrd (1936–1952) (his death) (1 child); Lloyd McLean (1957–1969) (his death)
- Children: Carroll Byrd Evangeline

Virginia Evangeline Carroll (December 2, 1913 – July 23, 2009) was an American actress. She was best known for her appearance in a number of western films.

== Biography ==
Carroll was born in Los Angeles on December 2, 1913. Her brother, Frank Carroll, became a Los Angeles newscaster. She worked as a model at a department store in Los Angeles until she began her film career in 1935.

Carroll was initially cast in a small part as a fashion model in the 1935 film, Roberta. She appeared in her first western film less than a year later in 1936's A Tenderfoot Goes West, co-starring Jack La Rue.

Carroll became a staple in B-listed western feature films, appearing opposite Tex Ritter, Don "Red" Barry, Roy Rogers, Johnny Mack Brown, Bill Elliott, Gene Autry and Whip Wilson. Her films included Oklahoma Terror (1939), the 1942 film Prairie Gunsmoke and Bad Men of Tombstone (1949).

Carroll was also cast in television roles later in her acting career, including roles on The Roy Rogers Show, Dragnet, The Adventures of Wild Bill Hickok and Perry Mason.

== Private life ==
Carroll married her first husband, actor Ralph Byrd, in 1936. Byrd would become best known for his role as comic strip hero Dick Tracy. Carroll and Byrd remained married until his death in 1952. She married her second husband, Lloyd McLean, a 20th Century Fox film projectionist, in 1957. The couple remained married until McLean's death in 1969, leaving Carroll a widow for the second time.

== Death ==
Virginia Carroll died at a Santa Barbara, California, retirement community on July 23, 2009, of natural causes at the age of 95. She was survived by one daughter from her marriage to Ralph Byrd, Carroll Byrd Evangeline.

== Selected filmography ==
- Raiders of the West (1942)
- Lake Placid Serenade (1944)
- The Last Round-up (1947)
- Frontier Agent (1948)
- Triggerman (1948)
- Bad Men of Tombstone (1949)
- Headline Hunters (1955)
