= Bad Men of Tombstone =

1949 film by Kurt Neumann

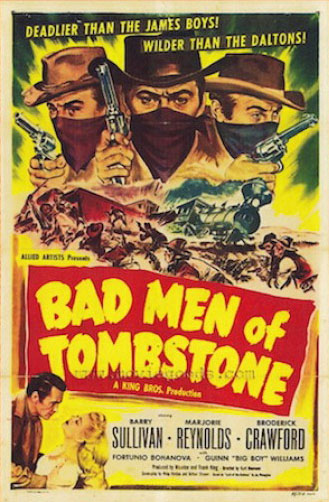
- Poster for the film
- Directed by: Kurt Neumann
- Written by: Philip Yordan; Arthur Strawn
- Based on: Last of the Badmen: The Legend of Tom Horn by Jay Monaghan
- Produced by: Maurice King; Frank King; Hyman King
- Starring: Barry Sullivan; Marjorie Reynolds; Broderick Crawford
- Cinematography: Russell Harlan
- Edited by: Richard Heermance
- Music by: Constantin Bakaleinikoff (director); Roy Webb (score)
- Production company: Monogram Productions
- Release date: January 22, 1949 (US)
- Running time: 74 minutes
- Country: United States
- Language: English

Bad Men of Tombstone is a 1949 American Western film from King Brothers Productions. It was co-written by Philip Yordan and stars Barry Sullivan and Broderick Crawford. King Brothers announced plans for a sequel, The Marshall of Tombstone but it was never made.

== Plot ==
Tom Horn tries to steal back $200 he lost in a poker game. He is thrown into a jail cell with outlaw William Morgan, whose gang members Red, Curly and Mingo break them out. Tom wins their trust by robbing a Colorado mining company. He is recognized by Julie, the company's bookkeeper, but she is attracted to him. The gang rides to Tombstone, Arizona, unhappy that Tom has married Julie and brought her along. A posse shoots Curly, who informs on the whereabouts of the rest. Red is murdered by Mingo, not wanting to split the loot. Tom is able to kill both Mingo and Morgan, but can't outdraw the law.

== Cast ==
- Barry Sullivan as Tom
- Broderick Crawford as Morgan
- Marjorie Reynolds as Julie
- Guinn Williams as Red
- John Kellogg as Curly
- Virginia Carroll as Matilda
- Fortunio Bonanova as Mingo
