= Sonora Stagecoach =

1944 film

- Lobby card
- Directed by: Robert Emmett Tansey
- Written by: Robert Emmett Tansey
- Screenplay by: Frances Kavanaugh
- Produced by: Robert Emmett Tansey
- Starring: Bob Steele; Hoot Gibson; Chief Thundercloud
- Cinematography: Edward Kull
- Edited by: John Fuller
- Music by: Frank Sanucci
- Production company: Monogram Pictures
- Release date: June 10, 1944
- Running time: 61 minutes
- Country: United States
- Language: English

Sonora Stagecoach is a 1944 American black-and-white Western film starring Bob Steele, Hoot Gibson and Chief Thundercloud. Directed, produced and written by Robert Emett Tansey for Monogram Pictures, the film was released in the United States on June 10, 1944.

== Plot ==
The Trail Blazers cowboys (Hoot Gibson, Bob Steele, and Chief Thundercloud) are escorting a prisoner accused of bank robbery back to justice in order to stand trial. Along the way, The Trail Blazers become convinced that the prisoner may be innocent, and several attempts are made on his life during the ride. A trap is then set for the real thieves.

== Cast ==
- Hoot Gibson as Hoot Gibson
- Bob Steele as Bob Steele
- Chief Thundercloud as Chief Thunder Cloud
- Gene Alsace as Rocky Camron (as Rocky Camron)
- Betty Miles as Betty Miles
- Glenn Strange as Paul Kenton
- George Eldredge as Lawyer Larry Payne (as Geo. Eldridge)
- Karl Hackett as Banker Joe Kenton
- Henry Hall as Sonora Sheriff Hampton
- Charles King as Henchman Blackie Reed (as Chas. King)
- Bud Osborne as Henchman Steve Martin (as Bud Osborn)
- Charles Murray Jr. as Henchman Weasel (as Chas. Murray Jr.)
- John Bridges as Pop Carson
- Forrest Taylor as Judge Crandall
- Al Ferguson as Henchman Red

== Preservation ==
A print is held in the Library of Congress collection.

== See also ==
- Bob Steele filmography
- Hoot Gibson filmography
