= Son of Geronimo =

1952 film by Spencer Gordon Bennet

- Theatrical release poster
- Directed by: Spencer Gordon Bennet (as Spencer G. Bennet)
- Screenplay by: George H. Plympton; Royal K. Cole; Arthur Hoerl
- Story by: George H. Plympton; Royal K. Cole; Arthur Hoerl
- Produced by: Sam Katzman
- Starring: Clayton Moore
- Cinematography: William P. Whitley (as William Whitley)
- Edited by: Earl Turner
- Color process: Black and white
- Production company: Sam Katzman Productions
- Distributed by: Columbia Pictures
- Release date: November 6, 1952
- Running time: 240 minutes (15 episodes)
- Country: United States
- Language: English

Son of Geronimo is a 1952 American Western Serial film directed by Spencer Gordon Bennet and starring Clayton Moore.

== Plot ==
Jim Scott attempts to bring peace between west-bound settlers and native Apaches. This task is made harder by a band of local outlaws.

== Cast ==
- Clayton Moore as Jim Scott (as Clay Moore)
- Bud Osborne as Tulsa
- Tommy Farrell as Frank Baker
- Rodd Redwing as Portico, Son of Geronimo
- Marshall Reed as Rance Rankin
- Eileen Rowe as Ann Baker
- John Crawford as Ace Devlin [Chs.1-9]
- Zon Murray as Henchman Bat
- Rick Vallin as Henchman Eadie
- Lyle Talbot as Col. Foster [Chs.5-6]
- Chief Yowlachie as Geronimo [ch 15]

== Chapter titles ==
1. War of Vengeance
2. Running the Gauntlet
3. Stampede
4. Apache Allies
5. Indian Ambush
6. Trapped by Fire
7. A Sinister Scheme
8. Prisoners of Porico
9. On the Warpath
10. The Fight at Crystal Springs
11. A Midnight Marauder
12. Trapped in a Flaming Teepee
13. Jim Scott Tempts Fate
14. A Trap for Geronimo
15. Peace Treaty

_{Source:}

== See also ==
- List of film serials by year
- List of film serials by studio

Preceded by Blackhawk (1952)	Columbia Serial; Son of Geronimo (1952)	Succeeded by The Lost Planet (1953)
