= Covered Wagon Trails =

1940 film directed by Raymond K. Johnson

- Theatrical release poster
- Directed by: Raymond K. Johnson
- Written by: Tom Gibson
- Produced by: Harry S. Webb
- Starring: Jack Randall; Sally Cairns; Lafe McKee
- Cinematography: Edward A. Kull
- Edited by: Robert Golden
- Music by: Johnny Lange; Lew Porter; Frank Sanucci
- Production company: Monogram Pictures
- Distributed by: Monogram Pictures
- Release date: April 10, 1940
- Running time: 52 minutes
- Country: United States
- Language: English

Covered Wagon Trails is a 1940 American Western film directed by Raymond K. Johnson, starring Jack Randall, Sally Cairns and Lafe McKee.

== Plot ==
When Jack Cameron's brother, Ed, is killed on his way to meet his brother who is arriving with a wagon train, Jack sets out to find his murderers. As part of his plan, he allows himself to be captured by Fletcher and his gang of outlaws. He uncovers that it was Fletcher who killed his brother, in order to plunder the wagon train. While he is on the murderers' trail, he meets Carol Bradford, the daughter of the wagon train's leader, John Bradford. The two fall in love. In the end, Jack brings the murderers to justice and Jack ends up with Carol.

== Cast ==
- Jack Randall as Jack Cameron
- Sally Cairns as Carol Bradford
- Lafe McKee as John Bradford
- David Sharpe as Ed Cameron
- Budd Buster as Manny
- Glenn Strange as Fletcher
- Kenne Duncan as Blaine
- George Chesebro as Carter
- Carl Mathews as Nixon
- Jimmy Aubrey as Denton
- Frank Ellis as Allen
- John Elliott as Beaumont
- Tex Terry as Ogden
- Hank Bell as Sheriff

== Production ==
In early March 1940 it was announced that Sally Cairns was to be the leading lady in the film. She joined a cast which already included Jack Randall, in the male leading role, Steve Clark, Glenn Strange, John Elliott, Kenne Duncan, and Dave Sharpe. Raymond K. Johnson was set to direct under the producing supervision of Harry S. Webb. Production began in the last week of February, and was scheduled for release on April 10, opening on time. Production on the film was finished by March 9. The National Legion of Decency gave the film a rating of A-1, "Unobjectionable for general patronage".

== Reception ==
Showmen's Trade Review gave the picture a positive review, feeling it was well-paced and would hold the interest of the audience throughout the show. They applauded the acting of Randall, as well as the editing of Robert Golden. The Film Daily gave the film a mediocre review, saying it was simple routine western fare, and the direction and cinematography were simply okay.

== Bibliography ==
- Pitts, Michael R. Western Movies: A Guide to 5,105 Feature Films. McFarland, 2012.
