= Under the Double Eagle =

Austrian military march

- March by Josef Wagner
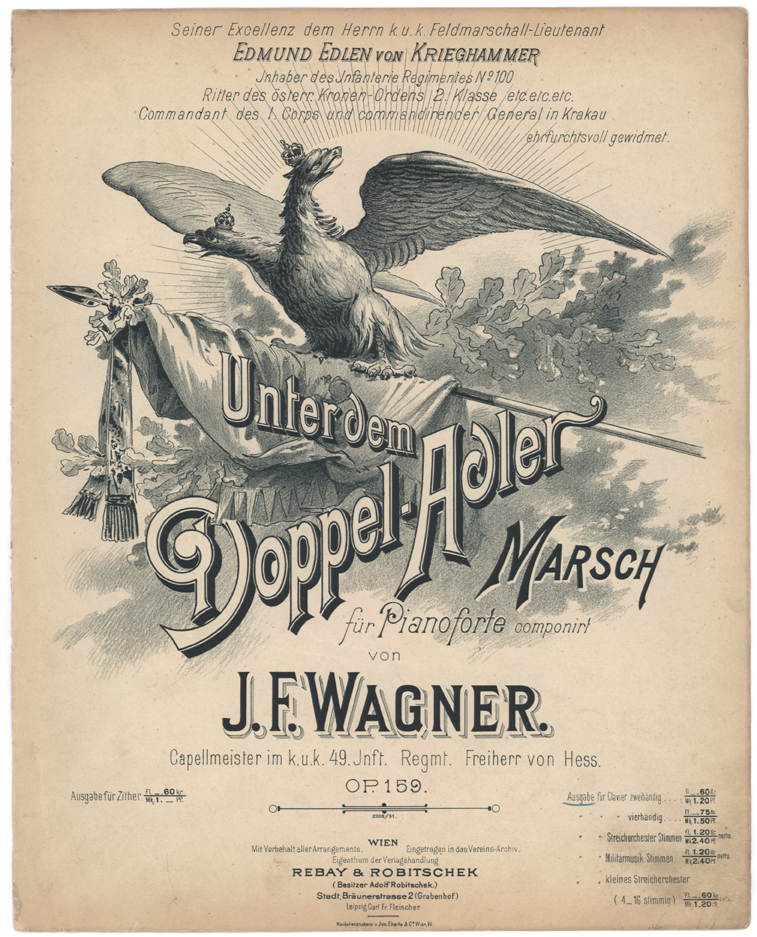
- Native name: "Unter dem Doppeladler"
- Key: E♭ major
- Opus: 159
- Form: Ternary
- Written: 1893
- Publisher: Eclipse Publishing Co.

"Under the Double Eagle" (German: Unter dem Doppeladler), Op. 159, is an 1893 march composed by Josef Wagner, an Austrian military music composer. The title is a reference to the two-headed eagle in the coat of arms of Austria-Hungary. This piece is in E♭ major, though the trio is in A♭ major. It is written in ternary form.

It was published in the United States in 1902 by Eclipse Publishing Co., a branch of Joseph Morris Music in Philadelphia, Pennsylvania. In 1935, Bill Boyd and His Cowboy Ramblers, with an arrangement by Mort Glickman on Bluebird Records, was second only to the Carter Family in the top Hillbilly (Country) music hits of the year. It became a Western swing standard, and has been recorded by many Country and Bluegrass artists since. The tune was parodied in the Benny Goodman recording "Benjie's Bubble" and was also used for the well-known Monty Python's Flying Circus animation segment "Conrad Poohs And His Dancing Teeth".

== History ==
Wagner was an Austrian military bandmaster and composer who is sometimes known as the "Austrian March King" for his march music. He served as the bandmaster of the 49th Infantry Regiment between 1891 to 1899 due to its more frequent deployment to places near Vienna. It was during this time that Wagner composed "Under the Double Eagle" in 1893 in Graz. The march was dedicated to Edmund von Krieghammer, the Imperial Minister of War at the time.

Within the Austro-Hungarian realm, Wagner's march became popular. It was the official regimental march of Austrian Artillery Regiment Number 2 until its dissolution in 2007. The march also became popular outside of Austria-Hungary. It became a favourite part of the repertoire of American composer and bandleader John Philip Sousa, whose band recorded it three times and helped popularise in America. In the 1930s and 1940s, "Under the Double Eagle" became popular in Texas in the United States, probably introduced by German or Austrian immigrants. Outside of Texas, the march was popular with fiddlers in Minnesota and West Virginia. Bill Boyd and His Cowboy Ramblers' version of the march became the fourth best-selling country song of 1935, and the march was frequently played by Allied bands during the Second World War. In the 1960s, the march became popular again after guitarist Doc Watson recorded his version.
