= Prairie Gunsmoke =

1942 film by Lambert Hillyer

- Theatrical release poster
- Directed by: Lambert Hillyer
- Screenplay by: Fred Myton
- Story by: Jack Ganzhorn
- Produced by: Leon Barsha
- Starring: Wild Bill Elliott; Tex Ritter; Frank Mitchell; Virginia Carroll; Hal Price; Tris Coffin
- Cinematography: Benjamin H. Kline
- Edited by: Art Seid
- Production company: Columbia Pictures
- Distributed by: Columbia Pictures
- Release date: July 16, 1942
- Running time: 56 minutes
- Country: United States
- Language: English

Prairie Gunsmoke is a 1942 American Western film directed by Lambert Hillyer and written by Fred Myton. The film stars Wild Bill Elliott, Tex Ritter, Frank Mitchell, Virginia Carroll, Hal Price and Tris Coffin. The film was released on July 16, 1942, by Columbia Pictures. It is the twelfth and final film in Columbia Pictures' "Wild Bill Hickok" series.

== Cast ==
- Wild Bill Elliott as Wild Bill Hickok
- Tex Ritter as Tex Terrell
- Frank Mitchell as Cannonball
- Virginia Carroll as Lucy Wade
- Hal Price as Henry Wade
- Tris Coffin as Jim Kelton
- Joe McGuinn as Spike Allen
- Frosty Royce as Sam
- Rick Anderson as Dan Whipple
