= Chief Yowlachie =

American actor (1890–1966)

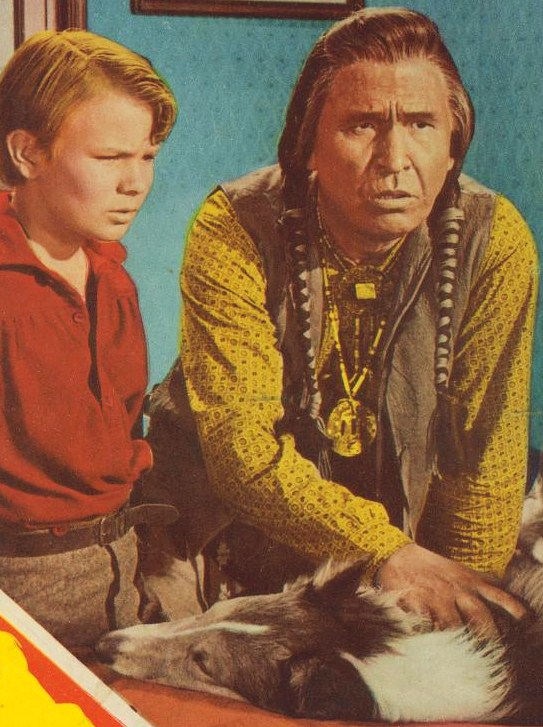
- Chief Yowlachie (right) with Gary Gray in a promotional poster for the 1951 film The Painted Hills
- Born: Daniel Simmons; August 15, 1890; Yakima, Washington, U.S.
- Died: March 7, 1966 (aged 75); Los Angeles, California, U.S.
- Resting place: Valhalla Memorial Park Cemetery in North Hollywood, California
- Occupations: Actor, opera singer
- Spouse: Lillian Simmons

Chief Yowlachie (August 15, 1890 – March 7, 1966), born Daniel Simmons, was a Native American actor from the Yakama tribe in the U.S. state of Washington, known for playing supporting roles and bit parts in numerous films. He is perhaps best known for playing Two Jaw Quo, Nadine Groot's assistant cook, in the classic 1948 Western Red River.

== Biography ==
On August 15, 1890, Yowlachie was born on the Yakima Indian Reservation in Washington. He was educated at the Government Indian Trade School.

From 1925 through 1930, Yowlachie made 12 films, 11 of which were Westerns. In his film debut, he played the title role in Tonio, Son of the Sierras (1925).

A Bass-baritone, Yowlachie studied opera under Pasquale Amato and sang on radio and on stage (including performing with the Los Angeles Philharmonic Orchestra) from 1931 through 1939. He sang at the White House on separate occasions for Herbert Hoover and Franklin Roosevelt. His other performances included singing at the Pacific Southwest Exposition in Long Beach, California, in 1928 and the dedication of Griffith Park's Greek Theatre in 1930. He also performed in programs at the Southwest Museum of the American Indian in Los Angeles.

Yowlachie resumed his film career in 1940, making 32 Westerns and two serials through 1955. His roles included Quo in Red River (1948) and Geronimo in the serial Son of Geronimo: Apache Avenger (1952). Despite his musical background, Yowlachie never sang in films in which he acted. The closest he came to singing on-screen was when his voice was used in a recorded prologue to a 1926 silent film.

His television appearances include "War Horse", an episode of The Lone Ranger; and "Rope of Lies", an episode of The Virginian. He appeared twice on The Range Rider. He appeared as the Apache Geronimo in the 1950s syndicated television series Stories of the Century.

In 1962, Chief Yowlachie played "The Great Chief" in the episode "The Black Robe" of NBC's western series The Tall Man.

On March 7, 1966, Yowlachie died in Los Angeles, California, following a stroke. His funeral included "an Indian death chant and ritual". He is buried in Valhalla Memorial Park Cemetery in North Hollywood, California. At the time of his death, he was married to Lillian Simmons.

== Selected filmography ==
- Kentucky Days (1923) - Indian Scout
- Tonio, Son of the Sierras (1925) - Tonio
- Ella Cinders (1926) - Indian (uncredited)
- Moran of the Mounted (1926) - Biting Wolf
- The Scarlet Letter (1926) - Indian (uncredited)
- Forlorn River (1926) - Modoc Joe
- War Paint (1926) - Iron Eyes
- Sitting Bull at the Spirit Lake Massacre (1927) - Chief Sitting Bull
- Hawk of the Hills (1927, Serial) - Chief Long Hand
- The Red Raiders (1927) - Lone Wolf
- The Glorious Trail (1928) - High Wolf
- Hawk of the Hills (1929) - Chief White Wolf
- The Invaders (1929)
- Tiger Rose (1929) - Indian (uncredited)
- The Santa Fe Trail (1930) - Brown Beaver
- The Girl of the Golden West (1930) - Billy Jackrabbit
- The Thundering Herd (1933) - Indian (uncredited)
- Man of Conquest (1939) - Cherokee Tribesman (uncredited)
- Flash Gordon Conquers the Universe (1940, Serial) - King of the Rock People [Chs. 7-9] (uncredited)
- Winners of the West (1940, Serial) - Chief War Eagle [Chs. 1, 5, 7, 9-10, 13]
- North West Mounted Police (1940) - Indian (uncredited)
- White Eagle (1941, Serial) - Chief Running Deer
- The Round Up (1941) - Chief Blackhawk (uncredited)
- Saddlemates (1941) - Council Chief (uncredited)
- This Woman Is Mine (1941) - Chief One-Eye Comcomly (uncredited)
- Outlaws of Cherokee Trail (1941) - Indian Poker Player (uncredited)
- Ride 'Em Cowboy (1942) - Chief Tomahawk (uncredited)
- King of the Stallions (1942) - Chief Matapotan
- Dawn on the Great Divide (1942) - Indian (uncredited)
- Frontier Fury (1943) - Nuyaka (uncredited)
- Canyon Passage (1946) - Indian Spokesman (uncredited)
- The Strange Woman (1946) - Indian Guide (uncredited)
- Wild West (1946) - Chief Black Fox
- Singin' in the Corn (1946) - Indian (uncredited)
- Oregon Trail Scouts (1947) - Indian (uncredited)
- The Hucksters (1947) - Indian (uncredited)
- Bowery Buckaroos (1947) - Big Chief Hi-Octane
- The Prairie (1947) - Matoreeh
- The Senator Was Indiscreet (1947) - Indian
- The Gallant Legion (1948) - Indian Medicine Man (uncredited)
- The Dude Goes West (1948) - Running Wolf
- Red River (1948) - Quo
- You Gotta Stay Happy (1948) - Indian (uncredited)
- The Paleface (1948) - Chief Yellow Feather
- Yellow Sky (1948) - Colorado (uncredited)
- El Paso (1949) - Paiute Pete (uncredited)
- Ma and Pa Kettle (1949) - Crowbar
- Tulsa (1949) - Charlie Lightfoot (uncredited)
- Canadian Pacific (1949) - Indian Chief (uncredited)
- The Cowboy and the Indians (1949) - Chief Long Arrow (uncredited)
- My Friend Irma (1949) - Indian (uncredited)
- Mrs. Mike (1949) - Atenou
- The Traveling Saleswoman (1950) - Sam (uncredited)
- Young Daniel Boone (1950) - Indian Guide (uncredited)
- Ma and Pa Kettle Go to Town (1950) - Crowbar (uncredited)
- A Ticket to Tomahawk (1950) - Pawnee
- Kill the Umpire (1950) - Indian (uncredited)
- Annie Get Your Gun (1950) - Little Horse (uncredited)
- Winchester '73 (1950) - Indian at Rifle Shoot (uncredited)
- My Friend Irma Goes West (1950) - Hiawatha - Indian Chief (uncredited)
- Indian Territory (1950) - Indian Chief (uncredited)
- Cherokee Uprising (1950) - Gray Eagle
- The Last Outpost (1951) - Cochise (uncredited)
- The Painted Hills (1951) - Bald Eagle
- Cavalry Scout (1951) - Indian Chief (uncredited)
- Warpath (1951) - Chief
- Lone Star (1952) - Mangas Colorado (uncredited)
- Buffalo Bill in Tomahawk Territory (1952) - Chief White Cloud
- The Half-Breed (1952) - Apache Chief (uncredited)
- Son of Geronimo: Apache Avenger (1952, Serial) - Geronimo [ch 15]
- Thunderbirds (1952) - Chief Whitedeer (uncredited)
- The Pathfinder (1952) - Eagle Feather
- Rose Marie (1954) - Black Eagle
- Gunfighters of the Northwest (1954, Serial) - Chief Running Elk
- Drums Across the River (1954) - Medicine Man (uncredited)
- The Wild Dakotas (1956) - Indian (uncredited)
- Hollywood or Bust (1956) - Chief Running Water (uncredited)
- The Spirit of St. Louis (1957) - Indian (uncredited)
- The Buccaneer (1958) - Choctaw Indian (uncredited)
- The FBI Story (1959) - Harry Willowtree (uncredited)
- Yellowstone Kelly (1959) - Medicine Man (uncredited)
- Heller in Pink Tights (1960) - Indian (uncredited)
- Nevada Smith (1966) - Medicine Man (uncredited) (final film role)
