= 1935 in country music =

This is a list of notable events in country music that took place in the year 1935.

== Events ==
sales remained approximately 14% of 1929 levels

== Top Hillbilly (Country) Recordings ==
The following songs were extracted from records included in Joel Whitburn's Pop Memories 1890-1954, record sales reported on the "Discography of American Historical Recordings" website, and other sources as specified. Numerical rankings are approximate, they are only used as a frame of reference.

| Rank | Artist | Title | Label | Recorded | Released | Chart Positions |
|---|---|---|---|---|---|---|
| 1 | Carter Family | "Can the Circle Be Unbroken (By and By)" | Melotone 13432 | May 6, 1935 | August 1935 | US Hillbilly 1935 #1, Grammy Hall of Fame 1998 |
| 2 | Gene Autry and Jimmy Long | "That Silver-Haired Daddy of Mine" | Vocalion 2991 | October 29, 1931 | February 1935 | US Hillbilly 1935 #2, 5,000,000 sold by 1940 |
| 3 | Patsy Montana Acc. by Prairie Ramblers | "I Want to be a Cowboy's Sweetheart" | Melotone 5-11-56 | August 16, 1935 | November 1935 | US Hillbilly 1935 #3, 1,000,000 sales, National Recording Registry 2011, Grammy Hall of Fame 2007 |
| 4 | Bill Boyd and His Cowboy Ramblers | "Under the Double Eagle" | Bluebird 5945 | January 27, 1935 | May 22, 1935 | US Hillbilly 1935 #4 |
| 5 | Gene Autry Trio | "Tumbling Tumbleweeds" | Melotone 13315 | January 11, 1935 | January 30, 1935 | US Hillbilly 1935 #5 |
| 6 | Shelton Brothers | "Just Because" | Decca 5100 | February 23, 1935 | May 1935 | US Hillbilly 1935 #6 |
| 7 | Jimmie Davis | "Nobody's Darling But Mine" | Decca 5090 | September 21, 1934 | April 1935 | US Hillbilly 1935 #7 |
| 8 | The Westerners (Massey Family) | "When The White Azaleas Start Blooming" | Perfect 13109 | March 20, 1934 | February 1935 | US Hillbilly 1935 #8, 1,000,000 sales (unverified) |
| 9 | Shelton Brothers | "Deep Elem Blues" | Decca 5099 | February 22, 1935 | May 1935 | US Hillbilly 1935 #9 |
| 10 | Gene Autry Trio | "Ole Faithful" | Melotone 13354 | January 14, 1935 | January 30, 1935 | US Hillbilly 1935 #10 |
| 11 | Milton Brown and His Musical Brownies | "St. Louis Blues" | Decca 46001 | January 1, 1935 | February 1935 | US Hillbilly 1935 #11 |
| 12 | Bob Wills and His Texas Playboys | "Mexicali Rose" | Vocalion 3086 | September 23, 1935 | November 1935 | US Hillbilly 1935 #12 |
| 13 | Gene Autry and Jimmy Long | "The Round-Up at Cheyenne" | Melotone 13261 | April 1, 1934 | February 1935 | US Hillbilly 1935 #13 |
| 14 | The Westerners (Massey Family) | "Brown Skin Gal (Down The Lane)" | Vocalion 2882 | November 8, 1934 | February 1935 | US Hillbilly 1935 #14 |
| 15 | Milton Brown and His Musical Brownies | "Beautiful Texas" | Decca 5071 | January 28, 1935 | February 1935 | US Hillbilly 1935 #15 |

== Births ==
- January 8 – Elvis Presley, "The King" and cross-genre singer (died 1977).
- April 5 – Warner Mack, countrypolitan-styled singer-songwriter from the late 1950s through late 1960s.
- August 2 – Hank Cochran, songwriter best known for writing hits by Patsy Cline, Ray Price, Eddy Arnold and others (died 2010).
- September 25 – Royce Kendall, father half of The Kendalls (died 1998).
- September 29 – Jerry Lee Lewis, pianist whose successfully fused honky tonk with rock music, making him one of the genre's most successful performers of the 1950s through 1980s; cousin of Mickey Gilley and Jimmy Swaggart (died 2022).
- November 30 – George Richey, songwriter and record producer; husband of Tammy Wynette (died 2010).

== Deaths ==
- August 15 – Will Rogers, 55, beloved humorist who had appeal with both country and popular music audiences (plane crash).
