= Chief Thundercloud =

American actor (1899–1955)

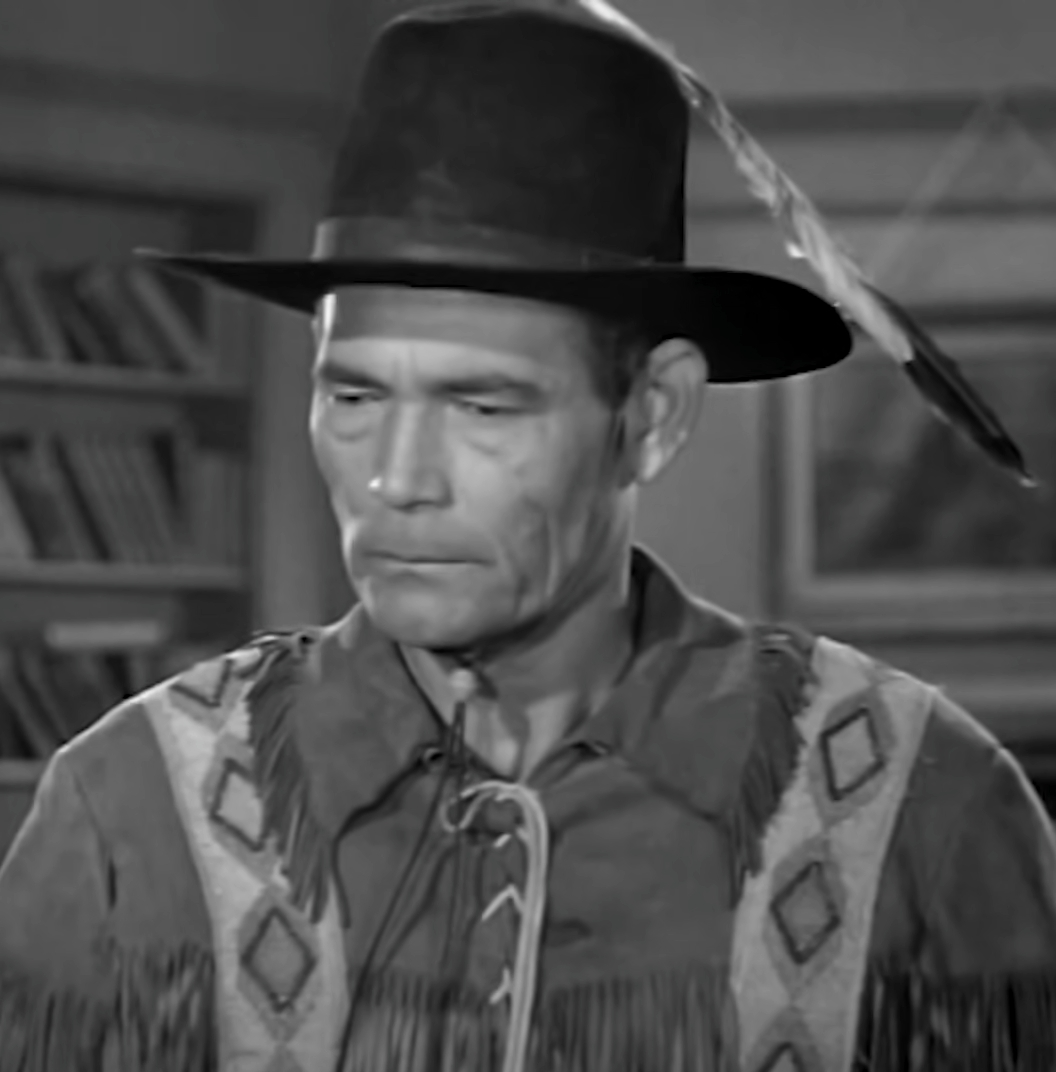
- Victor Daniels as Chief Whitecloud in Renegade Girl (1946)
- Born: Victor Daniels; April 12, 1899; Santa Cruz County, Arizona Territory, U.S.
- Died: December 1, 1955 (aged 56); Ventura, California, U.S.
- Resting place: Forest Lawn Memorial Park, Glendale
- Occupation: Actor
- Years active: 1935–1955
- Spouse(s): Mildred Ann Turner (1925–?); Frances Courtright (1933–1955 [his death])
- Children: Victor Junior Daniels; Norman Daniels (2 sons)

Victor Daniels (April 12, 1899 – December 1, 1955), known professionally as Chief Thundercloud, was an American character actor in Westerns. He is noted for being the first actor to play the role of Tonto, the Lone Ranger's Native-American companion, on the screen.

== Family and education ==
Information available about Daniels is limited and vague. He repeatedly said he was born in the Oklahoma Territory. However, his Social Security application lists his birth date as April 12, 1899, and his birthplace as Santa Cruz County in the Arizona Territory. He listed his parents as Jesus Daniels and Tomaca Daniels. On the 1900 Census, Jesus and Tomasa Daniels were listed as having been born in Mexico, and race was white. They did not show a son "Victor" on the 1900 Census. A marriage record is found for Jesus Daniels and Tomasa Acuña in Pima County, Arizona, from 1902.

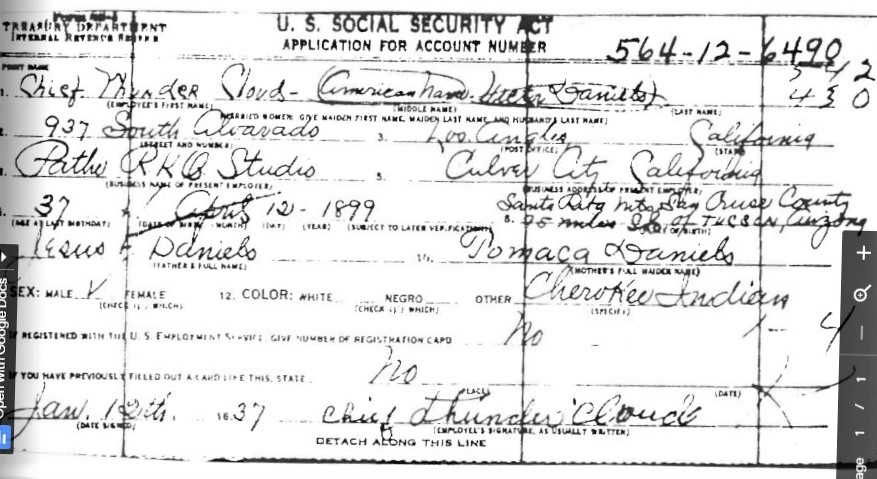
Social Security application of "Chief Thunder Cloud" (Daniels), 1937

He had a sister named Anita, born October 6, 1911, in Tucson, Pima County, Arizona Territory. On her birth certificate she listed similar parents with Jesus Daniel (born in Sonora) and Tomaso Acuna (born in Arizona).

Thundercloud's first marriage was to 17-year-old Mildred Turner from Missouri on May 26, 1925, in Los Angeles. At that time, he called himself "Victor Vasquez". Their son Victor Junior Daniels was born on May 7, 1926, and a second son, Norman Daniels, on September 5, 1927, both in Los Angeles. Thundercloud divorced Mildred and later married Frances Courtright on April 26, 1933.

His Lone Ranger press biography claimed he was derived from the "Muskogee aristocracy", but the concept of European "royalty" and "aristocrats" is foreign to most Native American cultures. He was actually the first of nine children born to Jesus and Tomaca Daniels (as indicated on his Social Security application). The pressbook for The Lone Ranger Rides Again announced his parents as "Dark Cloud and Morning Star, aristocrats of the Muskogee tribe" while his death certificate lists his father as Joseph Mahawa.

Raised on a ranch in Arizona, he claimed to have attended the University of Arizona at Tucson, where he "excelled scholastically and in athletics (football, boxing)". However, no record exists of his enrollment or attendance at the school under the name Daniels or any other name he used.

== Work as a character actor ==
Daniels worked many jobs – cowboy on cattle ranches, miner, rodeo performer, and tour guide – before he went to Hollywood to try his luck at acting. Daniels started as a stuntman. From there he graduated to character actor status. His title "Chief" was a Hollywood invention, a stage name. He had the title role in Geronimo (1939) and played Tonto in both Republic Lone Ranger serials, The Lone Ranger (1938) and The Lone Ranger Rides Again (1939).

Throughout the 1940s, Daniels continued to work as a character actor, maintaining the Chief Thundercloud persona. In most of the films in which he was featured, he played an antagonist opposing the white protagonist. For example, in the film Young Buffalo Bill (1940) he played Akuna, a renegade Native American chief who commits murder while working as a hired hand. In the film Renegade Girl (1946), he played the main villain, Chief Whitecloud, a vengeful antagonist with a vendetta against the protagonist's family.

Although featured in a number of films, Daniels was uncredited in some films, such as Gun Smoke (1936), a film about a ranch defending itself from a flood of sheep. He also appeared in the first two parts of the serial Custer's Last Stand (1936), again uncredited.

Daniels had a short appearance on early television on The Gene Autry Show (1950). Daniels appeared as Chief Thundercloud in the 1954 episode "The Saint's Portrait" of the syndicated anthology series Death Valley Days hosted by Stanley Andrews. One of his last appearances was on March 1, 1955, as the Apache Geronimo in the premiere of the syndicated television series Buffalo Bill, Jr..

== Legal problems and later years ==
According to the Los Angeles Daily News, Daniels was fined $200 and sentenced to four years of probation in 1951 after he pleaded guilty to violating the Corporate Security Act. He was told to make restitution of $5,625 to his victims after he had sold them shares in films without a permit. During his final years, he worked with other western actors performing in live shows at the Corriganville Movie Ranch, now the Corriganville Regional Park, near Simi Valley, California.

== Death ==
Victor Daniels died at age 56 following surgery for stomach cancer in Ventura County, California, on December 1, 1955. He was survived by his wife Frances and his two sons, Victor Junior Daniels and Norman Daniels. He was buried in Forest Lawn Memorial Park in Glendale, near Los Angeles. His last film role was in the John Wayne film The Searchers (1956), which was released after his death.

== The Lone Ranger and legacy ==
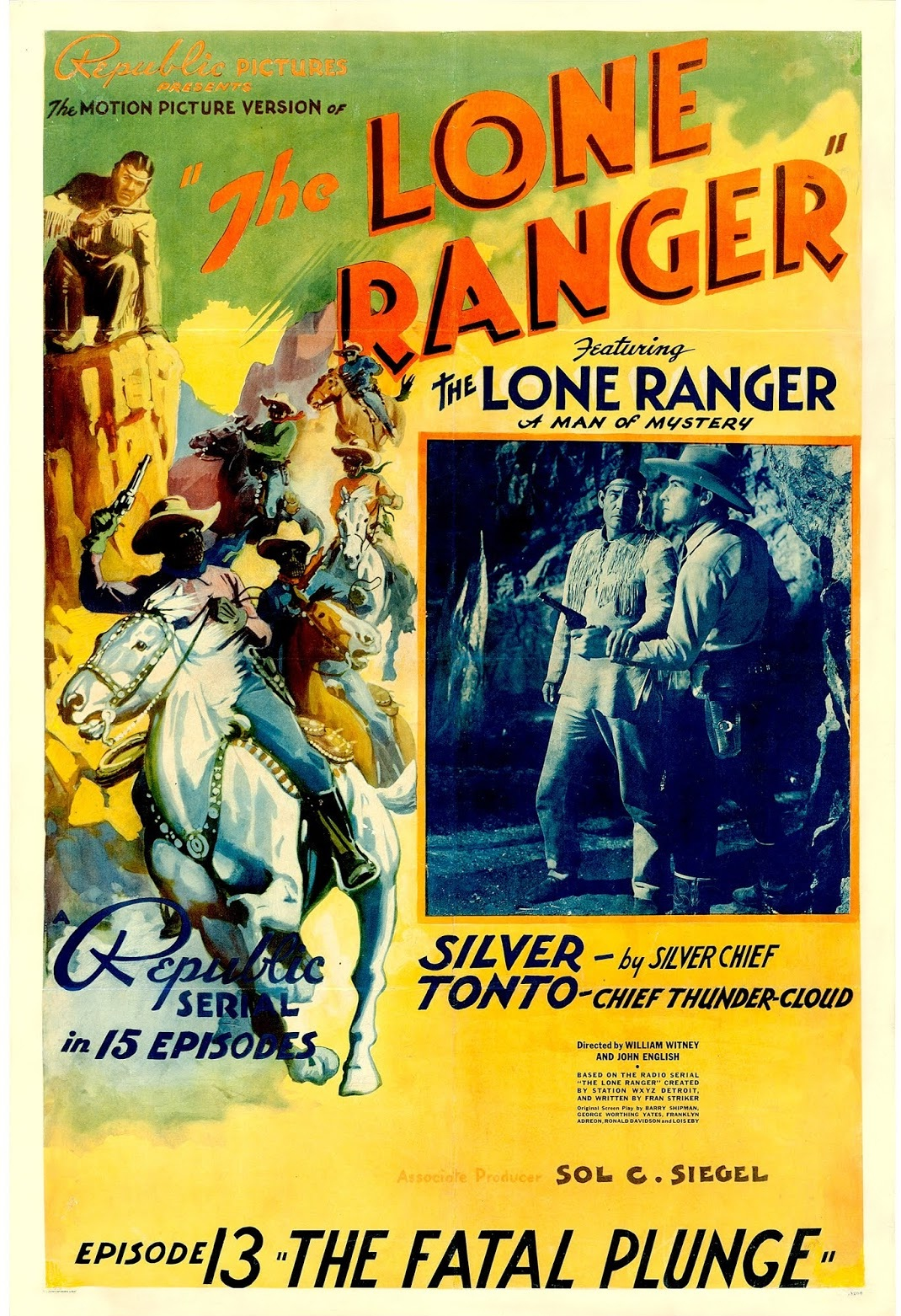
Poster for the 13th episode of the Lone Ranger serial

After working for some time as a stuntman and in bit parts, it was Daniels' portrayal of the character Tonto in the serial The Lone Ranger (1938) that was to be his legacy. This is perhaps where he gained the most recognition as a character actor. That same year, he had a small villain-like role in the first part of Flaming Frontiers, a 15-part cliffhanger about murder and double cross. The following year, Thundercloud reprised his role as the Lone Ranger's sidekick in The Lone Ranger Rides Again.

== Selected filmography ==
- Rustlers of Red Dog (1935, serial) – Chief Grey Wolf
- Cyclone of the Saddle (1935) – Thundercloud
- Wagon Trail (1935) – Henchman
- Rustler's Paradise (1935) – Henchman
- Gun Smoke (1935) – Sheep Herder
- Fighting Pioneers (1935) – Eagle Feathers
- Saddle Aces (1935) – Canejo Rider Jose
- The Farmer Takes a Wife (1935) – Indian Chief
- The Singing Vagabond (1935) – Young Deer
- Custer's Last Stand (1936, serial) – Young Wolf
- Silly Billies (1936) – Indian
- For the Service (1936) – Indian Brave
- Ramona (1936) – Pablo
- Ride, Ranger, Ride (1936) – Little Wolf
- The Plainsman (1936) – Indian #5 with Painted Horse
- The Bold Caballero (1936) – Zorro's aide
- Riders of the Whistling Skull (1937) – High Priest
- Wild West Days (1937) – Indian
- Renfrew of the Royal Mounted (1937) – Indian Henchman
- The Lone Ranger (1938, serial) – Tonto
- The Great Adventures of Wild Bill Hickok (1938, serial) – Chief Gray Eagle [Chs. 3, 14]
- Flaming Frontiers (1938, serial) – Thunder Cloud
- The Law West of Tombstone (1938) – Chief Little Dog
- The Lone Ranger Rides Again (1939, Serial) – Tonto
- Union Pacific (1939) – Cherokee Indian
- Man of Conquest (1939) – Cherokee Indian
- The Cat and the Canary (1939) – Indian Guide
- Fighting Mad (1939) – Indian
- Geronimo (1939) – Geronimo
- Murder on the Yukon (1940) – Manti – Henchman
- Young Buffalo Bill (1940) – Akuna
- Typhoon (1940) – Kehi
- Wyoming (1940) – Lightfoot
- North West Mounted Police (1940) – Wandering Spirit
- Hi-Yo Silver (1940) – (archive footage)
- Hudson's Bay (1941) – Orimha
- Western Union (1941) – Indian Leader
- Pirates on Horseback (1941) – Flying Cloud
- Silver Stallion (1941) – Freshwater
- Shut My Big Mouth (1942) – Indian Interpreter
- My Gal Sal (1942) – Murphy
- Lady in a Jam (1942) – Thundercloud
- King of the Stallions (1942) – Hahawi
- Overland Mail (1942) – Chief Many Moons [Ch. 13]
- The Valley of Vanishing Men (1942, serial) – Chief Tall Tree (ch. 9)
- Daredevils of the West (1943, serial) – Indian Chief [Ch. 8, 9]
- The Law Rides Again (1943) – Thundercloud
- The Fighting Seabees (1944) – Indian Seabee
- Buffalo Bill (1944) – Crazy Horse
- Outlaw Trail (1944) – Chief
- Sonora Stagecoach (1944) – Chief Thunder Cloud
- Raiders of Ghost City (1944, serial) – Chief Tahona
- Black Arrow (1944, serial) – Tribal Medicine Man
- Nob Hill (1945) – Indian Chief
- The Phantom Rider (1946, serial) – Chief Yellow Wolf
- Romance of the West (1946) – Chief Eagle Feather
- Badman's Territory (1946) – Chief Tahlequah
- Renegade Girl (1946) – Chief White Cloud
- Unconquered (1947) – Chief Killbuck
- The Prairie (1947) – Eagle Feather
- The Senator Was Indiscreet (1947) – Indian
- Blazing Across the Pecos (1948) – Chief Bear Claw
- Call of the Forest (1949) – Stormcloud
- Mrs. Mike (1949) – Indian
- The Traveling Saleswoman (1950) – Running Deer
- Davy Crockett, Indian Scout (1950) – Sleeping Fox
- Ambush (1950) – Tana
- A Ticket to Tomahawk (1950) – Crooked Knife
- Colt .45 (1950) – Walking Bear
- The Iroquois Trail (1950) – Ottawa Chief
- I Killed Geronimo (1950) – Geronimo
- Indian Territory (1950) – Indian
- Last of the Buccaneers (1950) – Indian Leader on Galveston Island
- Santa Fe (1951) – Chief Longfeather
- Buffalo Bill in Tomahawk Territory (1952) – Black Hawk
- The Half-Breed (1952) – Apache
- The Searchers (1956) – Comanche Chief
