= Josef Wagner (composer) =

Austrian military bandmaster and composer

Josef Franz Wagner
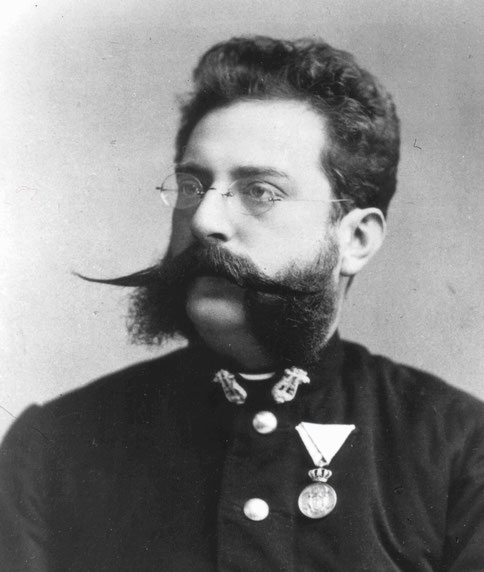
- Wagner wearing a medal
- Born: March 20, 1856; Vienna, Austrian Empire
- Died: June 5, 1908 (aged 52); Vienna, Austria-Hungary
- Resting place: Vienna Central Cemetery
- Other names: "The Austrian March King"
- Known for: Composing military marches
- Notable work: Unter dem Doppeladler

Josef Franz Wagner (20 March 1856 – 5 June 1908) was an Austrian military bandmaster and composer. He is sometimes referred to as "The Austrian March King".

Hailing from Vienna, which remained a key location in his life, Wagner joined a military band early on following his education. Between 1874 and 1899, Wagner would remain a member of the military band of different infantry regiments of the Austro-Hungarian army, becoming a successful bandmaster from 1878 to his death. Among his most famous work is Unter dem Doppeladler (Under the Double Eagle). Wagner died in 1908 following an accumulation of debt.

== Early life and education ==
Josef Franz Wagner was born on 20 March 1856 in Vienna, Austrian Empire, to Josef Wagner, a doctor, and Maria Anna Wagner (née Oberthanner). Wagner (the doctor) had migrated to Vienna from Bohemia, while Anna had migrated from Moravia. Their son completed his primary education in Henriette Kumenecker's singing school in Vienna, and his secondary education at the Stiftsgymnasium in Seitenstetten between 1869 and 1873. As a boy, Wagner excelled as a soprano in a church choir. After completing his secondary education, he was privately taught at the Austro-Hungarian military institute in Košice (German: Kaschau) by Johann Emmerich Hasel who taught Wagner composition, harmony and instrumentation.

== Career ==
In 1872, Wagner composed his first work: Dulde und verzage nicht (Endure and do not despair). The following year, he was presented as a successful composer on the front page of the newspaper Deutsche Musik-Zeitung. In 1874, Wagner travelled from Vienna to Budapest to joined the band of the 23rd Infantry Regiment led by Philip Fahrbach jnr.

During Wagner's time as bandmaster, military bands in Austria were privately financed by regimental officers, which resulted in competition between bandmasters for jobs. He ended up first serving with the 47th Infantry Regiment between 1878 and 1891 in Trento in Tyrol, Vienna, and Marburg (Maribor) and Graz in Styria. However, due to the 47th's frequent deployment to parts of Austria-Hungary far from Vienna, Wagner decided to change over to the 49th Infantry Regiment at Sankt Pölten, which he served in between 1891 and 1899. With the 49th, he was deployed to Krems near Vienna, Mostar in Bosnia-Herzegovina and Brno in Moravia. When in Krems and Brno, the 49th's played on Sundays and public holidays at the Kursalon during the winter, and at the Hotel am Kahlenberg in the summer, both of which are in Vienna. Additionally, they played frequently in other Vienna venues including the flower halls of the Gartenbau-Gesellschaft and in the Prater. When the 49th was stationed in Mostar, Wagner was allowed to stay in Vienna while still receiving a full salary.

As a result of issues with being in the military, such as no pension for bandmasters and a conflict with his artistic ambitions, Wagner in 1900 founded his own private band based in Vienna that played in Donmayer's Casino in Hietzing. His time in the private space, however, was not a financial success as Wagner accumulated large sums of debt. Since the 1890s, he became increasingly ill and often complained of headaches in his letters. He ended up developing bronchitis, and by the beginning of 1907 a serious heart condition. As a result of this heart condition, Wagner spent most of his last year of life in bed. He died on 5 June 1908 in Vienna. He was granted an Ehrengrab (grave of honour) at the Vienna Central Cemetery (Group 35 A, Row G 2, Grave 8).

== Music ==
"Under the Double Eagle"
"Under the Double Eagle", played by the U.S. Navy Band

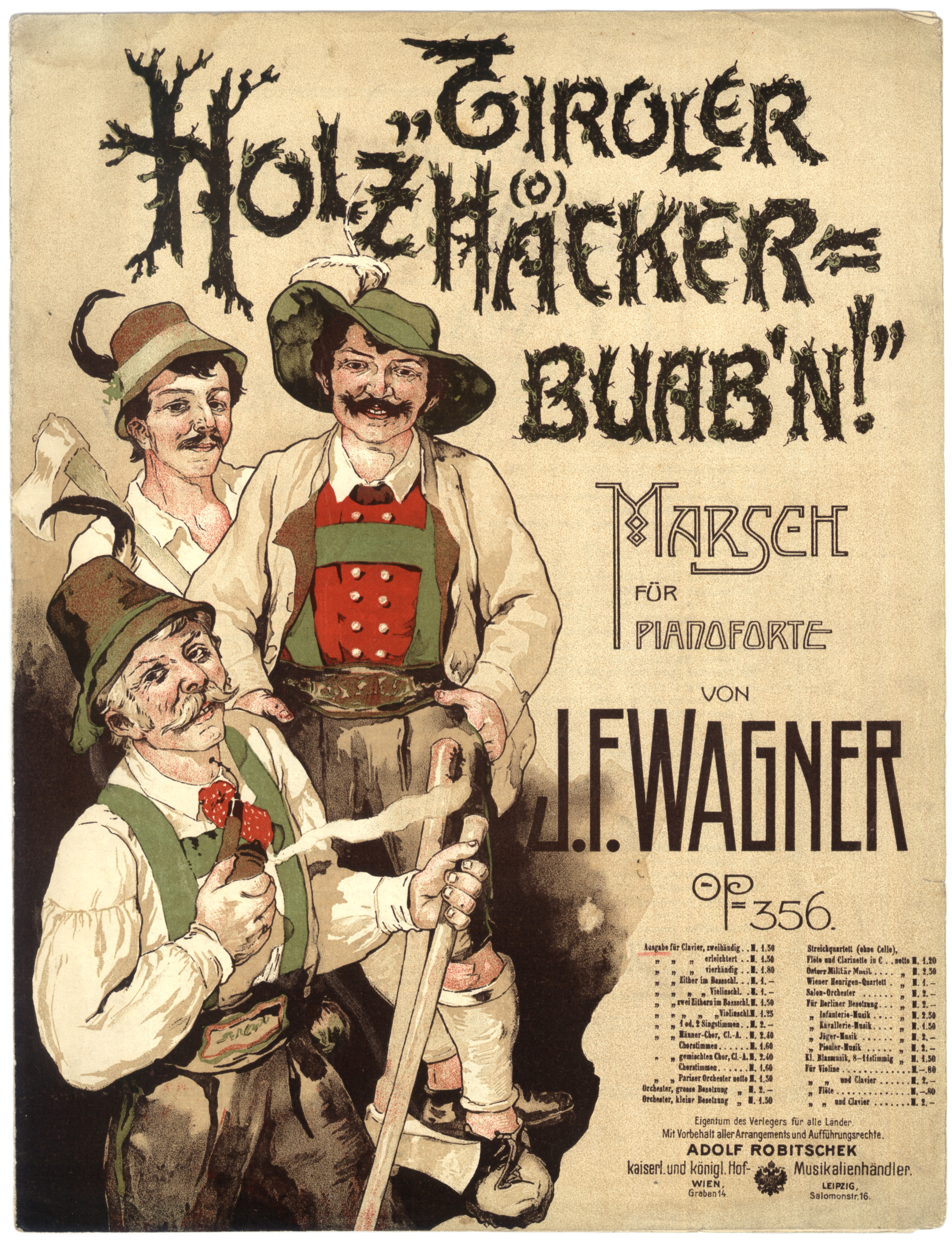
Tyrolean Lumberjacks' sheet music

By the time of Wagner's death in 1908, he had composed around 400 to 800 compositions, although only around 250 were published. Although majority of these were marches (he had published 206 marches), he had also composed waltzes, overtures, tone poems and operettas.

Wagner is best known for his 1893 march "Unter dem Doppeladler" (Op. 159) or "Under the Double Eagle", referring to the double eagle in the coat of arms of Austria-Hungary. The march became a favourite part of the repertoire of American composer and bandleader John Philip Sousa, whose band recorded it three times. The piece was the official regimental march of Austrian Artillery Regiment Number 2 until its dissolution in 2007. Below are some notable published works:

=== Marches ===
- Der Stutzer (The Dude's March; 1890)
- Unter dem Doppeladler, op. 159 (Under the Double Eagle; 1893)
- Gigerl Marsch, op. 150 (Gigerl March; 1900) - by the beginning of the 20th century, over 300,000 copies of the march's sheet music had been sold.
- Schwert Österreichs (Sword of Austria)
- 47er Regiments-Marsch (47th Regiment March)
- Tiroler Holzhackerbuab'n (Tyrolean Lumberjacks)

=== Operettas ===
In his career, Wagner composed three operettas listed below:

- Herzbub (Jack of Hearts; 1895)
- Der Kognakkönig (The Cognac King; 1897)
- Der Soubrettenjäger (The Soubrette Hunter; 1905)

== See also ==
- List of Austrians in music
