= The Texas Marshal =

1941 film directed by Sam Newfield

- Theatrical release poster
- Directed by: Sam Newfield
- Screenplay by: William Lively
- Produced by: Sigmund Neufeld
- Starring: Tim McCoy; Art Davis; Kay Leslie; Karl Hackett; Edward Peil Sr. Charles King
- Cinematography: Jack Greenhalgh
- Edited by: Holbrook N. Todd
- Production company: Sigmund Neufeld Productions
- Distributed by: Producers Releasing Corporation
- Release date: July 13, 1941
- Running time: 58 minutes
- Country: United States
- Language: English

The Texas Marshal is a 1941 American Western film directed by Sam Newfield and written by William Lively. The film stars Tim McCoy, Art Davis, Kay Leslie, Karl Hackett, Edward Peil Sr. and Charles King. The film was released on July 13, 1941, by Producers Releasing Corporation.

== Plot ==
A rancher has been killed near the town of Cactus Creek. Marshall Tim is called to investigate the murder and find other ranchers that have gone missing. After comparing bullets, Tim finds a match in Moore's henchmen and finds tin ore samples and suspicious deeds in his safe.

== Cast ==
- Tim McCoy as Trigger Tim Rand
- Art Davis as Art Davis
- Kay Leslie as Marge Adams
- Karl Hackett as Ernest Moore
- Edward Peil Sr. as Sam Adams
- Charles King as Ray Titus
- Dave O'Brien as Buzz Weston
- Budd Buster as Henderson
- John Elliott as John Gorham
- Wilson Edwards as Radio Announcer
- Byron Vance as Deputy Bill
- Gene Haas as Rhythm Riders Band Member
- Ace Dehne as Rhythm Riders Band Member
- Rusty Cline as Rhythm Riders Band Member
- Tony Fiore as Rhythm Riders Band Member

== Bibliography ==
- Fetrow, Alan G. Feature Films, 1940-1949: a United States Filmography. McFarland, 1994.
