= Come On, Rangers =

1938 film

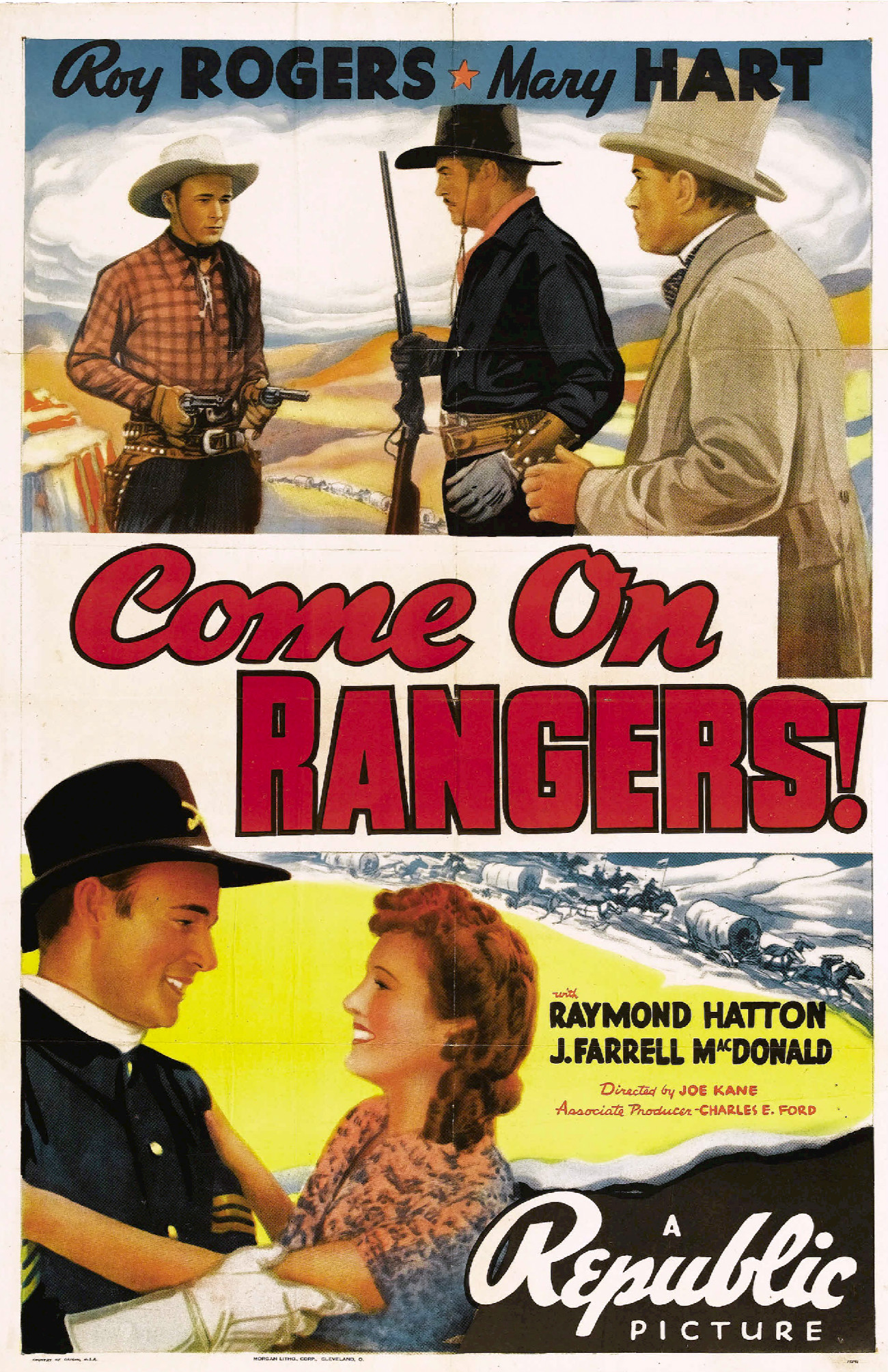
- Theatrical release poster
- Directed by: Joseph Kane
- Written by: Gerald Geraghty (original screenplay) & Jack Natteford (original screenplay)
- Produced by: Charles E. Ford (associate producer)
- Starring: Roy Rogers
- Cinematography: Jack A. Marta
- Edited by: Edward Mann
- Music by: Cy Feuer; William Lava; Joseph Nussbaum
- Production company: Republic Pictures
- Distributed by: Republic Pictures
- Release date: November 21, 1938
- Running time: 57 minutes
- Country: United States
- Language: English

Come On, Rangers is a 1938 American Western musical film directed by Joseph Kane and starring Roy Rogers.

== Plot ==
The Texas Rangers are disbanded, so Roy joins the Cavalry but deserts when the Cavalry can't stop the outlaws and his brother dies because of it.

== Cast ==
- Roy Rogers as Roy Rogers
- Lynne Roberts as Janice Forbes
- Raymond Hatton as Jeff
- J. Farrell MacDonald as Colonel Forbes
- Purnell Pratt as Senator Harvey
- Harry Woods as Morgan Burke
- Bruce MacFarlane as Lieutenant Nelson
- Lane Chandler as Ken Rogers
- Chester Gunnels as Smith
- Lee Powell as Ranger Earp

== Soundtrack ==
- Roy Rogers and other Texas Rangers – "Song of the West" (Written by Eddie Cherkose and Walter Kent)
- Roy Rogers – "Let Me Hum a Western Song" (Written by Eddie Cherkose and Walter Kent)
- Roy Rogers – "I've Learned a Lot About Women" (Written by Johnny Marvin)
- Roy Rogers and soldiers – "Tenting Tonight on the Old Camp Ground" (Written by Walter Kittredge)
