= Lee Powell (actor) =

American actor

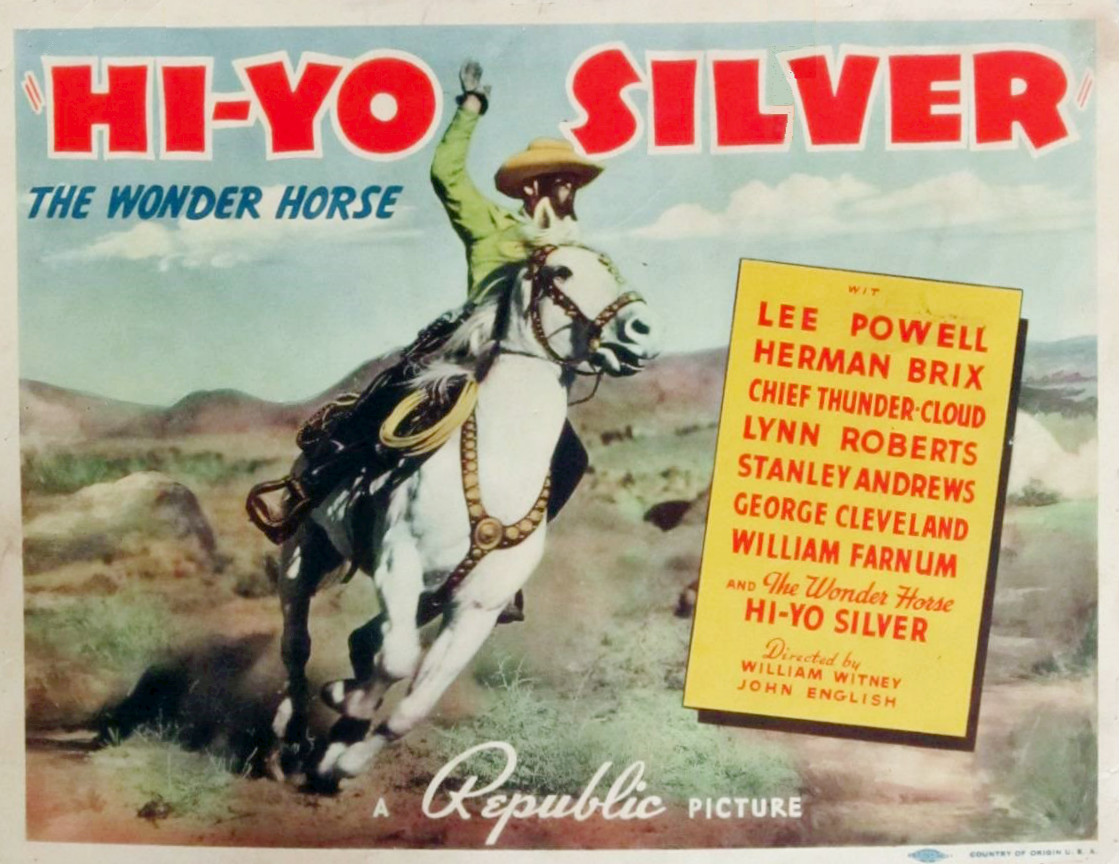
- Lobby card for Hi-Yo Silver starring Lee Powell as the Lone Ranger
- Born: Lee Berrian Powell; May 15, 1908; Long Beach, California, U.S.
- Died: July 30, 1944 (aged 36); Tinian, Mariana Islands
- Occupation: Film actor

Lee Berrian Powell (May 15, 1908 – July 30, 1944) was an American film actor known for leading or other major roles in several serials and B-westerns. He was the first actor to portray The Lone Ranger on film. During World War II, he enlisted in the U.S. Marine Corps, saw combat and died on active service in the Pacific Theatre.

== Film career ==
Powell attended the University of Montana, where he studied dramatics, football, and track as his main interests. After various stock work he tried his luck in Hollywood.

Making his first appearance uncredited in Under Two Flags (1936), Powell gained fame for playing the suspect who turned out to be The Lone Ranger and one of The Fighting Devil Dogs in 1938 serials. He was the first actor to portray the Lone Ranger on film. In addition to making films for Republic Pictures, Powell also appeared in Universal Pictures Flash Gordon Conquers the Universe serial, made one Western for the soon-to-be-defunct Grand National Pictures and made the six Western programmer films of the Frontier Marshals series, in which each of the three leads (the others being Bill "Cowboy Rambler" Boyd and Art Davis) played a lawman bearing his own name, for Producers Releasing Corporation. Between films, Powell also appeared in Barnett Brothers circus being billed as "The Lone Ranger" until litigation had him change his billing. Powell married Norma Rogers, a circus bareback rider and the circus owner's daughter.

== Military service ==
During the Second World War, Powell enlisted in the United States Marine Corps on August 17, 1942. He served in the Pacific Theater in the 2nd Pioneer Battalion, 18th Marine Regiment of the 2nd Marine Division. Powell took part in the battles of Tarawa and Saipan, achieving the rank of sergeant.

=== Death ===
Powell died from poisoning on Tinian in July 1944. Although it was widely reported in contemporary press reports that he had been killed in action, he actually died from drinking an improvised alcoholic beverage that contained Methanol celebrating the end of the Battle of Tinian. Known commonly as wood alcohol, the chemical is highly toxic if ingested; one other marine was temporarily blinded from drinking it. In another version, CBS correspondent Fred Goerner, who spoke to former marines who had fought in the battles of Saipan and Tinian while conducting research for his best seller The Search for Amelia Earhart (1966), heard that Powell died after drinking poisoned sake.

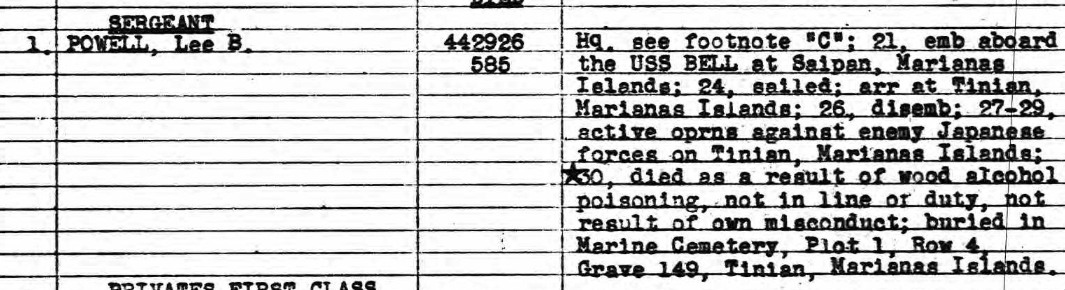
Excerpt from the US Marine Corps Muster Roll for 2nd Battalion of the 18th Marine Regiment, July 1944

The monthly muster roll of the 2nd Battalion of the 18th Marines, notes that on July 30, 1944, Powell "died as a result of wood alcohol poisoning, not in line of duty, not result of own misconduct".

The reason that Powell's death was "officially" reported in newspapers at the time that he had been killed in action was so his young fans could believe the "Lone Ranger" had died heroically fighting the Japanese not from drinking alcohol.

Initially buried on Tinian, Powell's remains were transferred to the National Memorial Cemetery of the Pacific in Honolulu.

== Filmography ==
Year	Title	Role	Notes
1936	Under Two Flags		Uncredited
1937	Forlorn River	Duke – Henchman	
1937	The Last Gangster	Federal Man	Uncredited
1938	The Lone Ranger	Allen King	Serial
1938	The Fighting Devil Dogs	Lieutenant Tom Grayson	Serial
1938	Come On, Rangers	Ranger Earp	
1939	Trigger Pals	Stormy	
1940	Flash Gordon Conquers the Universe	Captain Roka	Serial
1941	The Lone Rider Rides On	Curly Robbins	
1941	The Return of Daniel Boone	Tax Collector Fuller	
1942	Texas Man Hunt	Marshal Lee Clark	
1942	Raiders of the West	Marshal Lee Powell	
1942	I Was Framed		Uncredited
1942	Rolling Down the Great Divide	Marshal Lee Powell	
1942	Tumbleweed Trail	Marshal Lee Powell	
1942	Secret Enemies	Agent Outside Hotel	Uncredited
1942	Prairie Pals	Marshal Lee Powell	
1942	Along the Sundown Trail	Marshal Lee Powell	
1944	The Adventures of Mark Twain	Cowboy	Uncredited, (final film role)
