= Romance of the West (1946 film) =

1946 American western film

- Theatrical release poster
- Directed by: Robert Emmett Tansey
- Screenplay by: Frances Kavanaugh
- Produced by: Robert Emmett Tansey
- Starring: Eddie Dean; Emmett Lynn; Joan Barton; Forrest Taylor; Robert McKenzie; Jerry Jerome; Stanley Price; Chief Thundercloud
- Cinematography: Marcel Le Picard
- Edited by: Hugh Winn
- Production company: Producers Releasing Corporation
- Distributed by: Producers Releasing Corporation
- Release date: March 20, 1946
- Running time: 58 minutes
- Country: United States
- Language: English

Romance of the West is a 1946 American Western film directed by Robert Emmett Tansey and written by Frances Kavanaugh. The film stars Eddie Dean, Emmett Lynn, Joan Barton, Forrest Taylor, Robert McKenzie, Jerry Jerome, Stanley Price and Chief Thundercloud. The film was released on March 20, 1946, by Producers Releasing Corporation.

== Cast ==
- Eddie Dean as Eddie Dean
- Emmett Lynn as Ezra
- Joan Barton as Melodie
- Forrest Taylor as Father Sullivan
- Robert McKenzie as Lem Matthews
- Jerry Jerome as Duke Morris
- Stanley Price as Jim Lockwood
- Chief Thundercloud as Chief Eagle Feather
- Don Reynolds as Little Brown Jug
- Lottie Harrison as Miss Twitchell
