= Call of the Forest (1949 film) =

1949 film

- Directed by: John F. Link
- Screenplay by: Craig Burns
- Produced by: Edward Finney
- Starring: Robert Lowery; Ken Curtis; Chief Thundercloud; Black Diamond; Charlie Hughes
- Cinematography: Karl Struss (as Karl O. Struss)
- Edited by: Asa Boyd Clark
- Music by: Karl Hajos
- Production company: Edward F. Finney Productions
- Distributed by: Screen Guild Productions
- Release date: November 18, 1949
- Running time: 57 minutes
- Country: United States
- Language: English

Call of the Forest is a 1949 American Western film directed by John F. Link and starring Robert Lowery, Ken Curtis, Chief Thundercloud, Black Diamond and Charlie Hughes. It was also known as The Flaming Forest and Untamed.

The Los Angeles Times reviewer thought it "seemed to be cramming all the outdoors pictures ever made into one".

== Plot ==
A rancher and prospector Bob Brand (Ken Curtis) searches for riches from a lost gold mine, his son Bobby (Charlie Hughes) befriends an American Indian named Stormcloud (Chief Thundercloud). As a reward for Bobby's kindness, Stormcloud provides him with a map to the mine, so he can help his father's search. Greedy Sam Harrison (Robert Lowery) gets wind of the map, however, and attempts to violently upset their plans. After Harrison defeats Bob, Bobby and his stallion, King, must confront the dangerous man.

== Cast ==
- Robert Lowery as Sam Harrison
- Ken Curtis as Bob Brand
- Chief Thundercloud as Stormcloud
- Black Diamond as King, the stallion
- Charlie Hughes as Bobby Brand
- Martha Sherrill as Nancy Sommers
- Tom Hanly as Dan McKay
- Fred Gildart as Pinto Peterson
- Eula Guy as Mrs. Joe
- Jimmy the Crow as The Crow
- Beady the Raccoon as The Raccoon
- Ripple the Deer as The Deer
- Fuzzy the Bear as The Bear
