= The Lone Ranger (serial) =

Film series

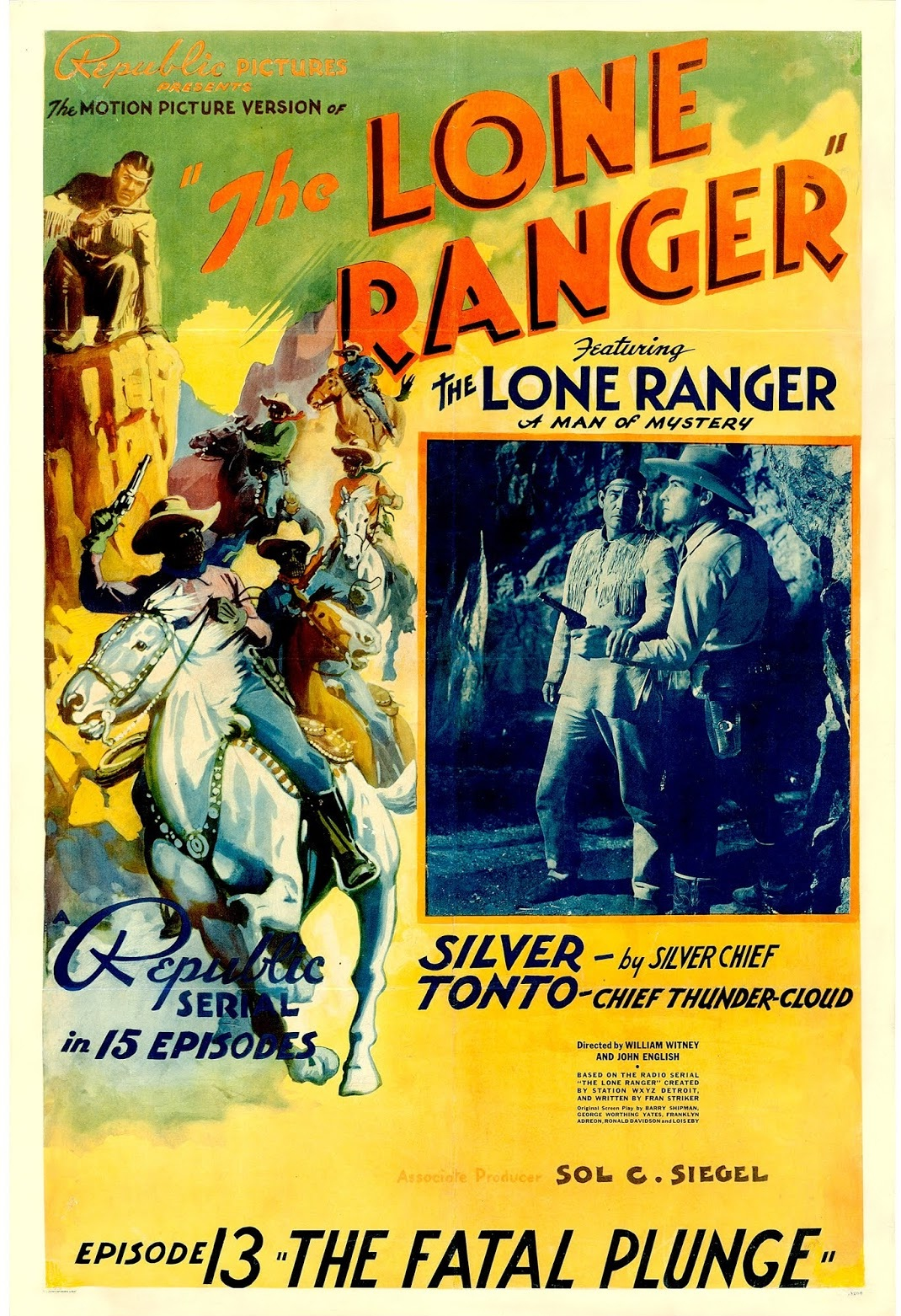
- Poster for Chapter 13 of The Lone Ranger
- Directed by: William Witney and John English
- Screenplay by: Barry Shipman; George Worthing Yates; Franklyn Adreon; Ronald Davidson; Lois Eby
- Based on: the radio serial The Lone Ranger, by Fran Striker
- Produced by: Sol C. Siegel (associate producer)
- Starring: Lee Powell; Chief Thunder-Cloud
- Cinematography: William Nobles
- Edited by: Helene Turner; Edward Todd
- Music by: Alberto Colombo (musical director)
- Distributed by: A Republic Production
- Release dates: February 12, 1938 (serial); April 10, 1940 (feature)
- Running time: 15 chapters (264 minutes) (serial); 69 minutes (feature)
- Country: United States
- Language: English
- Budget: $160,315 (negative cost: $168,117) or $285,000
- Box office: $1,150,000

The Lone Ranger, Chapter 1: Hi-Yo Silver

The Lone Ranger is a 1938 American Republic Pictures movie serial based on The Lone Ranger radio program. It was the ninth of the sixty-six serials produced by Republic, the fourth Western (a third of Republic's serials were Westerns) and the first Republic serial release of 1938. The following year a sequel serial The Lone Ranger Rides Again was released. The fifteen chapters of the serial were condensed into the film Hi-Yo Silver, which was released in 1940.

== Plot ==
In 1865, Captain Mark Smith of the Confederate Army leads a band of deserters to conquer Texas and rule it as a dictator. In one of his first actions, he captures and assumes the identity of Texas's new Finance Commissioner, Colonel Marcus Jeffries, after having the real man murdered. When a contingent of Texas Rangers enters the territory, Snead, one of Smith's men, leads them into an ambush by Smith's "troopers". The Rangers are apparently wiped out, although one injured survivor is left. The survivor, nursed back to health by Tonto, swears to avenge the massacre and defeat "Colonel Jeffries" and his men.

When he is not operating as the Ranger, he appears under an assumed identity as one of a group of Texans resisting Smith's rule. Smith, through a henchman, has narrowed the field of suspects down to five specific members of the resistance. One of these five—Allen King, Bob Stuart, Bert Rogers, Dick Forrest, and Jim Clark—actually is the Ranger, but only Tonto and the other four Texans know which one it is. Together, they operate as an effective team attempting to end Smith's rule.

== Cast ==
Main cast

- Silver King as Silver
- Lynn Roberts as Joan Blanchard, George Blanchard's daughter
- Stanley Andrews as Mark Smith, former captain in the Confederate Army working under the identity of the murdered Colonel Marcus Jefferies, State Finance Commissioner
- George Cleveland as George Blanchard, emissary from Washington, D.C.
- William Farnum as Father McKim, local priest and ally of the Lone Ranger who sends messages via carrier pigeon

Supporting cast

- Chief Thunder-Cloud as Tonto, or "Wild One" in Native American language
- Hal Taliaferro as Bob Stuart, a Texan fighting against Smith who may be the Lone Ranger
- Herman Brix as Bert Rogers, a Texan fighting against Smith who may be the Lone Ranger
- Lee Powell as Allen King, a Texan fighting against Smith who is revealed to be the Lone Ranger
- Lane Chandler as Dick Forrest, a Texan fighting against Smith who may be the Lone Ranger
- George Letz as Jim Clark, a Texan fighting against Smith who may be the Lone Ranger
- John Merton as "Kester", one of Smith's henchmen, a deserter and former captain in the Confederate Army
- Sammy McKim as "Sammy"
- Tom London as "Felton", one of Smith's henchmen, a deserter and former sergeant in the Confederate Army
- Raphael Bennet as Black Bart Taggart, one of Smith's henchmen
- Maston Williams as Joe Snead, one of Smith's henchmen
- Frank McGlynn, Sr. as President Lincoln (scene deleted from serial release, only appears in feature version Hi Yo Silver)

Uncredited

- Billy Bletcher as voice of The Lone Ranger
- Earle Graser as voice of The Lone Ranger when calling "Hi-Yo Silver!"; Graser was the voice of the Lone Ranger on the initial radio series

== Production ==
A contract between Republic and George W. Trendle for a Lone Ranger serial, and the right to release a condensed version, was signed in June 1937. Trendle and The Lone Ranger Inc. were paid $18,750 plus 10% of any rental share above a $390,000 minimum.

There was some disagreement between Republic and Trendle but the contract gave Republic authority over the script and characters. Republic planned that the Lone Ranger would unmask in the last chapter, revealing himself to Joan Blanchard (Lynn Roberts) as Allen King (Lee Powell). Prior to this the issue was confused by two voices for the Lone Ranger (mainly Billy Bletcher but with Earle Graser from the radio series providing the signature cry of "Hi-Yo Silver") and his stunt double (Dave Sharpe). Trendle objected to Republic's plans for the serial. However, he could not prevent it as the contract gave Republic Pictures the right to do whatever it pleased with the character. Republic was notorious for making changes in its adaptations, the most extreme case of which was Captain America (1944), Prior to the reveal, the audience had been presented with several candidates who may have been the Lone Ranger but only one survived to the end. A similar approach was taken with The Masked Marvel (1943).

After the second Lone Ranger serial, which features Robert Livingston as the title character, who appeared in a mostly unmasked state, George Trendle decided to dissolve his relationship with Republic and offer the property to another studio. After apparently ordering all prints of both Republic serials to be destroyed to prevent further exhibition, Trendle took with him the Ranger's origin story as presented in the serial, and rights to the serial's music, both of which were later used on the radio and other media versions of the character's adventures.

The Lone Ranger was budgeted at $160,315 although the final negative cost was $168,117 (a $7,802, or 4.9%, overspend). It was the most expensive Republic serial until the release of Dick Tracy Returns later in 1938.

It was filmed between 28 November and 31 December 1937. At nineteen days, this was the shortest production for a Republic serial until Zombies of the Stratosphere in 1952. The serial's production number was 794.

The bulk of the outdoor action in the serial The Lone Ranger was filmed at the Iverson Movie Ranch in Chatsworth, California, where Republic shot virtually all of its serials, along with most of its B-Westerns, during the studio's life span — and where the later TV series The Lone Ranger would also shoot much of its outdoor footage. Additional footage for the serial was shot in the Alabama Hills near Lone Pine, California, giving the serial a strikingly different overall look from that of the more widely seen television version.

The Lone Ranger was the biggest serial event since Universal's Flash Gordon (1936).

Following the end of his contract with Republic, Lee Powell toured with a small circus as "The Lone Ranger of the Movies". This was not successful, possibly because he had never actually been billed as the Lone Ranger due to the element of mystery in the script. He was eventually forced by the copyright holders to stop.

=== Stunts ===
- David Sharpe as The Lone Ranger
- Yakima Canutt
- Ken Cooper
- Duke Green
- Eddie Juaregui
- George Magrill
- Loren Riebe
- Duke Taylor
- Bill Yrigoyen
- Joe Yrigoyen

== Release ==
=== Theatrical ===
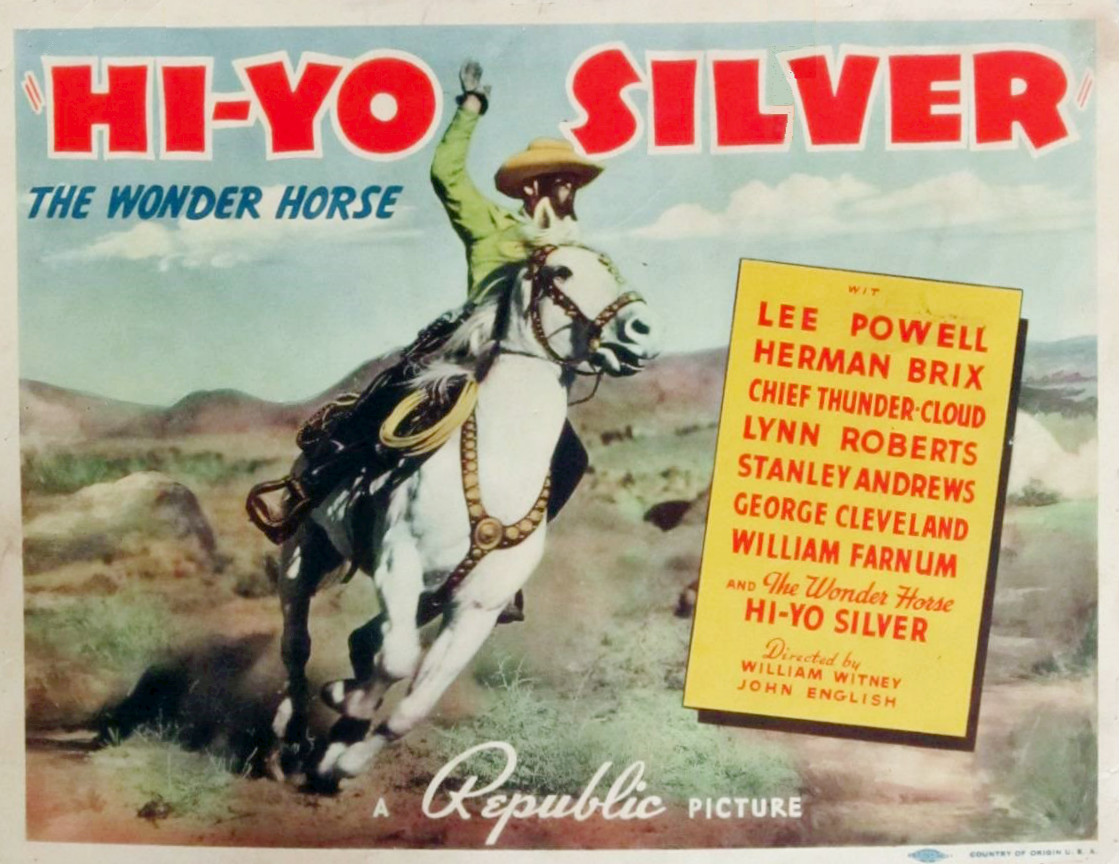
Lobby card for the 1940 version

The Lone Ranger's official release date is 12 February 1938, although this is actually the date the seventh chapter was made available to film exchanges.

A 69-minute feature film version, created by editing the serial footage together, was released on 10 April 1940. It was one of fourteen feature films Republic made from their serials. The working title of this film was Return of the Ranger but it was released as Hi-Yo-Silver.

The Lone Ranger was a huge financial success for both Republic and Trendle. The serial also created new interest in the radio version and an additional hundred or so stations picked up the show. King Features even came out with a comic strip.

== Critical reception ==
In the words of Harmon and Glut, the serial contains "tight plotting that became certainly atypical of Republic serials." Most serials introduced all the characters and plot elements in the first chapter. The Lone Ranger, however, added new elements during the course of the serial. In chapter eight the outlaw Jeffries substitutes Confederate money for the local taxes. The tax silver then becomes one of the main focal points of the plot. Another development occurs in chapter ten when Jeffries tries to force Joan to marry him, which was an unusual plot element for a sound serial.

The Lone Ranger was superior in terms of plot and execution when compared to the average western serial, although it contained many features standard to the genre such as explosions, runaway stagecoaches and falls from a great height.

According to Cline, The Lone Ranger was probably the best of the Western serials and should be included in "any list of the ten best sound serials of all."

== Chapter Titles ==
1. Hi-Yo Silver (30 min 17s)
2. Thundering Earth (18 min 22s)
3. The Pitfall (16 min 43s)
4. Agent of Treachery (16 min 39s)
5. The Steaming Cauldron (16 min 17s)
6. Red Man's Courage (16 min 28s)
7. Wheels of Disaster (15 min 58s)
8. Fatal Treasure (16 min 54s)
9. The Missing Spur (16 min 35s)
10. Flaming Fury (16 min 33s)
11. The Silver Bullet (16 min 18s)
12. Escape (16 min 22s)
13. The Fatal Plunge (16 min 37s) -- Re-Cap Chapter
14. Messengers of Doom (16 min 49s)
15. The Last of the Rangers (17 min 03s)

_{Source:}

== Cliffhangers ==
=== Cliffhangers ===
1. Hi-Yo Silver: The Lone Ranger is trampled by the Confederate deserters.
2. Thundering Earth: The Lone Ranger, Joan and George Blanchard are caught in a landslide caused by an explosion.
3. The Pitfall: The Lone Ranger falls into a spiked pit trap.
4. Agent of Treachery: With the Lone Ranger knocked unconscious, one of Smith's henchmen attempts to remove his mask. This is "one of the weaker cliffhangers of modern serials" in which the Lone Ranger is hit on the head by a hand thrown rock.
5. The Steaming Cauldron: Rescuing Smith's ungrateful henchman, Taggart, the Lone Ranger is caught in the eruption of a geyser.
6. Red Man's Courage: Attempting to rescue Tonto, being burned at the stake by Comanches who have found silver bullets at the scene of a killing, the Lone Ranger is thrown from Silver and attacked.
7. Wheels of Disaster: The Loan Ranger and Joan are blown up while aboard a wagon full of gunpowder.
8. Fatal Treasure: Bob Stuart and Dick Forrest, both potentially the Lone Ranger, are caught in a well as Kester fires on it with a cannon.
9. The Missing Spur: Kester rips off one of the Lone Ranger's spurs and notices its absence on one of his captives.
10. Flaming Fury: The Lone Ranger and Tonto barricade themselves inside a barn, which catches fire and collapses.
11. The Silver Bullet: Bob Stuart is badly wounded in a gun fight and about to be finished off by one of Smith's henchmen.
12. Escape: Losing control of the reins of a stagecoach, the Lone Ranger (with Joan and George Blanchard), fall over a cliff.
13. The Fatal Plunge: Dick Forrest tackles Felton from a cave ledge and both fall to the floor below.
14. Messengers of Doom: The Lone Ranger is caught in a cave-in caused by gunfire.

=== Resolutions ===
1. Thundering Earth: The Lone Ranger disrupts the oncoming stampede with gunfire.
2. The Pitfall: The Lone Ranger takes cover under a ledge. Joan and George Blanchard outrace the landslide in their coach.
3. Agent of Treachery: The Lone Ranger escapes by clinging to the walls of the trap and climbing out.
4. The Steaming Cauldron: Tonto rescues the Lone Ranger.
5. Red Man's Courage: Silver rears, punching Taggart into the geyser, while the Lone Ranger pulls himself the safety by lassoing Silver's saddle.
6. Wheels of Disaster: The chief Dark Cloud releases both as ordinary lead bullets have been found in the bodies.
7. Fatal Treasure: The team of horses breaks free, taking Joan and the Loan Ranger with them.
8. The Missing Spur: Bob Stuart and Dick Forrest crawl through a pipe to another well and escape.
9. Flaming Fury: All four captives (Bob, Bert Allen and Dick) are missing a spur each.
10. The Silver Bullet: Both take cover in a pit and then escape on horseback.
11. Escape: The henchman menacing Bob Stuart is shot by the Lone Ranger.
12. The Fatal Plunge: The Lone Ranger, Joan and George jump clear.
13. Messengers of Doom: Felton is killed but Dick survives with a back injury.
14. The Last of the Rangers: The Lone Ranger takes cover but Dick Forrest is buried alive.
