= Sally Cairns =

American actress (1919–1965)

- Born: Sara Jane Cairns; December 7, 1919; Roscoe, Pennsylvania, U.S.
- Died: February 9, 1965 (aged 45); Los Angeles, California, U.S.
- Other name: Sarah Jane Cairns
- Years active: 1940-1944
- Spouse(s): Thomas Piper (1940–?); Harold Lewis (?–1965)
- Children: 1

Sally (or Sara or Sarah) Jane Cairns (December 7, 1919 – February 9, 1965) was an American film actress. She appeared in over 15 films between 1940 and 1944.

== Early years ==
Cairns was the daughter of Mr. and Mrs. William P. Cairns. Her father was a justice of the peace, and she had three sisters. She studied at California High School in California, Pennsylvania. As a youngster, she performed with the Stone House Players community theater group. In 1939 she had her first lead with the group. When she was a teenager she won a dramatics scholarship to Duquesne University.

== Career ==
Cairns sang with the Ted Waldron Orchestra. During her junior year at Duquesne University, she won the local Gateway to Hollywood acting competition. She finished second in the national competition, losing to Gale Storm.

Upon arriving in Hollywood in 1940, Cairns signed with Monogram Pictures and made her film debut with cowboy star Addison Randall in Covered Wagon Trails.

Modern television viewers will recognize Cairns for her roles in two Three Stooges films from the 1940s. She was Moe Howard's dancing partner who manages to lose her skirt in Three Smart Saps. She appeared as Tizzy in the film Back from the Front. Thanks to the popularity of the Stooges, Cairns is seen almost daily worldwide due to the films' constant television broadcasts.

== Personal life and death ==
Cairns was married twice, first to Thomas Piper on May 26, 1940. Her second marriage was to Harold Lewis, a production manager in films. They had a daughter.

Cairns died of colorectal cancer on February 9, 1965, at age 45.
