= Art Davis (actor) =

American actor

Audrey "Art" Davis (May 31, 1913 – January 16, 1987) was an American musician, singer and actor.

== Biography ==
Davis was born in Paradise, Texas, United States. His family moved to Oklahoma when he was two and then back to Texas to the town of Lewisville. His father was a musician, and by the age of seven, Davis was an accomplished fiddler. His parents divorced and his mother moved the family to Dallas where Davis enrolled in high school. He played football and was in the school band playing clarinet. He served in the 112th Cavalry Regiment of the Texas National Guard where he gained riding experience

His first band was called The Rhythm Aces and they worked with many Western Swing bands such as Milton Brown and his Musical Brownies, the Light Crust Doughboys, and Bill Boyd's Cowboy Ramblers. In 1934, Davis was recording with the Cowboy Ramblers for Bluebird Records. He added the mandolin to his repertoire of instruments that he played. He became a staff musician at WRR Radio in Dallas and met Gene Autry who was looking for a backup fiddler for a recording session. He recorded with Autry on September 22, 1935 for American Record Corporation.

Autry offered Davis work in Autry's movies and on road tours. He worked with Autry for three years and then moved to Equity Pictures to work on Adventures of the Masked Phantom (1939) under the name Larry Mason. His next movie was The Texas Marshal (1941) with Tim McCoy. He then appeared in six serial films in 1941 and 1942 with Lee Powell and his singing buddy Bill Boyd. Davis served in the United States Navy in World War II. His last time on film was a short musical A Cowboy's Holiday (1949).

Davis continued to make a living with music into the 1980s. He died in January 1987, at the age of 73 in Bloomburg, Texas.
