= Bill Boyd (musician) =

American Western style singer and guitarist (1910–1977)

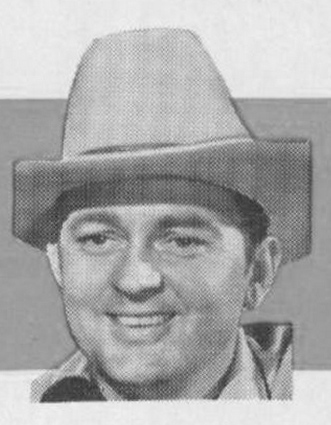

Background information
- Birth name: William Lemuel Boyd
- Also known as: Bill "Cowboy Rambler" Boyd
- Born: September 29, 1910 Fannin County, Texas, United States
- Died: December 7, 1977 (aged 67) Dallas, Texas, United States
- Genres: Western Swing
- Occupation(s): Singer, songwriter, musician
- Instrument: Guitar
- Labels: RCA Victor, Bluebird

William Lemuel Boyd (September 29, 1910 – December 7, 1977) was an American Western-style singer and guitarist.

== Biography ==
Boyd was born and raised on a farm near Ladonia in Fannin County, Texas as one of thirteen children. His parents, Lemuel and Molly Jared Boyd, who originally hailed from Tennessee, came to Texas in 1902. During the Great Depression, the family moved to Dallas. Bill and his brother Jim (born 1914) tried to survive the hard times by working different odd jobs. Bill joined the Alexanders Daybreakers trio performing at early-morning radio shows. Together with Jim, he appeared on radio in Greenville, Texas and at WRR in Dallas Meanwhile, Jim formed the "Rhythm Aces." In February 1932, Boyd recorded with the "Blue yodeler" Jimmie Rodgers. The same year, he formed the pioneering western swing band "The Cowboy Ramblers". His band consisted of himself on guitar, Jim Boyd on bass, Walter Kirkes on tenor banjo and Art Davis on fiddle. During the band's history, many of the members also worked simultaneously with the Light Crust Doughboys and Roy Newman's Boys. The Cowboys Ramblers made more than 225 recordings between 1934 and 1951. The band had their own popular radio show, "The Bill Boyd Ranch House." They made their recording debut for Bluebird Records on August 7, 1934. In 1935, the Cowboy Ramblers had a huge hit with their recording of "Under the Double Eagle," which later became a western swing standard and remained in print for twenty-five years. Other classics of the 1930s include "Wah Hoo", "Beaumont Rag", "Fan It", "New Steel Guitar Rag", and "I've Got Those Oklahoma Blues".

The Cowboy Ramblers became major stars on radio and were offered work in Hollywood films and Boyd eventually appeared in six Western films during the 1940s. One of his other hits was "If You'll Come Back", No. 4, Jan. 1941.

After the outbreak of World War II, Boyd joined "The Western Minute Men" promoting the sale of war bonds. During the 1940s, Jim Boyd often led the Cowboy Ramblers when his brother was indisposed. Eventually, Jim formed his own band, the 'Men of the West'. In the 1950s, the brothers terminated their radio show and became DJs. In the early 1970s, Bill Boyd retired from the music business. His brother Jim Boyd died in 1993.

For his contribution to radio, Bill 'Cowboy Rambler' Boyd has a star on the Hollywood Walk of Fame at 6101 Hollywood Blvd.

== Discography ==
- Hopalong Cassidy and the Singing Bandit (Capitol 3058, 1950, US No. 7)
- Bill Boyd's Cowboy Ramblers (RCA Bluebird AXM2-5503, 1975) [2LP]
- Bill Boyd and His Cowboy Ramblers (1934–1947) (Texas Rose TXR-2701, 1982)
- The Master of Cowboy Swing (Bronco Buster CD-9002, 1995)
- The Eyes of Texas (Cattle CCD-205, 1998)
- The Golden Age of Bill Boyd (Cattle CCD-229, 2000)
- Swing with Bill Boyd and His Cowboy Ramblers (Cattle CCD-234, 2000)
- Saturday Night Rag 1934–1936 (Volume 1) (Acrobat ACRCD-132, 2003)
- Lone Star Rag 1937–1949 (Volume 2) (Acrobat ACRCD-145, 2004)
