= Cowboy Serenade =

1942 film with Gene Autry, Smiley Burnette, Fay McKenzie

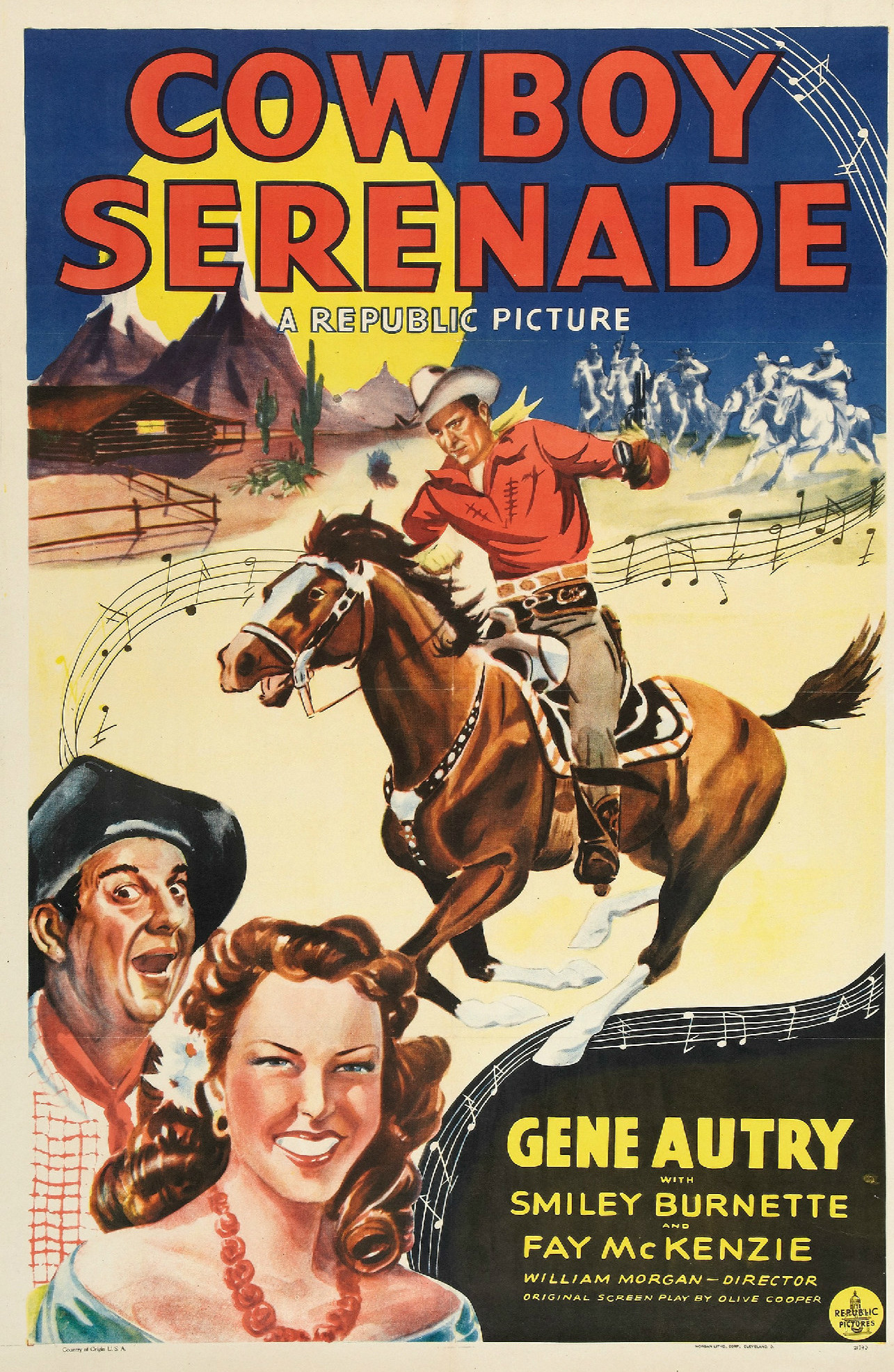
- Theatrical release poster
- Directed by: William Morgan
- Screenplay by: Olive Cooper
- Produced by: Harry Grey
- Starring: Gene Autry; Smiley Burnette; Fay McKenzie
- Cinematography: Jack A. Marta
- Edited by: Lester Orlebeck
- Music by: Raoul Kraushaar (supervisor)
- Production company: Republic Pictures
- Distributed by: Republic Pictures
- Release date: January 30, 1942 (U.S.)
- Running time: 66 minutes
- Country: United States
- Language: English
- Budget: $83,486

Cowboy Serenade is a 1942 American Western film directed by William Morgan and starring Gene Autry, Smiley Burnette, and Fay McKenzie. Written by Olive Cooper, the film is about a singing cowboy and cattleman who goes after a gambling ring after they fleece the cattlemen association's representative of their cattle. The film features the songs "Nobody Knows", and "Sweethearts or Strangers", and the title song.

== Plot ==
As president of the Flagpole Cattlemen's Association, singing cowboy Gene Autry (Gene Autry) entrusts the sale of the association's large cattle herd to young Jimmy Agnew (Rand Brooks), who is so thrilled with the opportunity that he proposes marriage to his girlfriend, Millie Jackson (Linda Leighton). The next day, while traveling to Hays City with the cattle, Jimmy is persuaded to join a poker game by two crooked gamblers, Dixie Trambeau (Tristram Coffin) and Joe Crowley (John Berkes), who fleece the naive cattleman and force him at gun point to turn over the power of attorney authorizing them to sell the cattle. Ashamed at his blunder, Jimmy goes into hiding.

Back in town, the distraught cattlemen prepare to swear out a warrant for Jimmy's arrest. Gene and his sidekick Frog Millhouse (Smiley Burnette) ask them to hold off, offering to go to Hays City to search for him. At Hays City, Gene and Frog meet with District Attorney Stevens (Forbes Murray), who tells them about Trambeau's crooked gambling ring, which is responsible for fleecing many ranchers. Stevens explains that the spur railway line on which Trambeau and Crowley operate is out of his jurisdiction, and that he cannot investigate it without the permission of the line's owner, Asa Lock (Addison Richards). Stevens does not know that Trambeau and Crowley receive their orders directly from Asa, the secret leader of the gambling ring.

Gene and Frog go to Asa's office seeking his help, but learn he is out of town. They meet his daughter Stephanie (Fay McKenzie), who hires them as ranchhands, assuming they are looking for work. Soon, Gene is romancing Stephanie, while her aunt, Priscilla Smythe (Cecil Cunningham), pursues Frog. The romancing is interrupted, however, when Asa returns to the ranch. Gene reveals the purpose of his visit and asks Asa to allow an investigation of the spur line. Asa refuses to cooperate, and goes off to contact Trambeau and Crowley, ordering them to hide out near the ranch. Unaware of her father's criminality, Stephanie tells Gene that she can prove her father's innocence, and soon gives Stevens permission to conduct his investigation.

Despite several attempts by Asa to have him killed, Jimmy finally comes out of hiding and rides to the ranch with Gene to tell his story. Later, Gene and Frog discover the gamblers' hideout, but Trambeau and Crowley are able to escape with the help of Priscilla and the Locks' Chinese servant and ride back to the ranch. There they learn that Asa sent Jimmy a false message directing him to Stevens' office, having planned for a truck to run Jimmy off the road. When Asa finds out that Stephanie is in the car with Jimmy, he rushes off to save her. Just before the collision, Gene jumps into Stephanie's car and steers it away from the oncoming truck, which then collides with Asa's car. As Asa lays dying, Gene assures him that he will take care of his daughter.

Afterwards, at Jimmy and Millie's wedding, Priscilla catches the bouquet from the bride as Gene and Stephanie look on in laughter.

== Cast ==
- Gene Autry as Gene Autry
- Smiley Burnette as Frog Millhouse
- Fay McKenzie as Stephanie "Steve" Lock
- Cecil Cunningham as Priscilla Smythe
- Addison Richards as Asa Lock
- Rand Brooks as Jim Agnew
- Tristram Coffin as Dixie Trambeau
- Slim Andrews as Pappy Vanderpyle
- Linda Leighton as Millie Jackson
- John Berkes as Joe Crowley
- Otto Han as Ling (uncredited)
- Forbes Murray as District Attorney Stevens (uncredited)
- Champion as Gene's Horse (uncredited)

== Production ==
=== Filming and budget ===
Cowboy Serenade was filmed November 24 to December 10, 1941. The film had an operating budget of $83,486 (equal to $1,827,437 today), and a negative cost of (equal to $2,067,167 today).

=== Filming locations ===
- Agoura, California, USA
- Beale's Cut, Newhall Pass, California, USA
- Chatsworth Railroad Station, Chatsworth, California, USA
- Crowley Lake, California, USA
- Iverson Ranch, 1 Iverson Lane, Chatsworth, Los Angeles, California, USA
- Republic Pictures Backlot, Studio City, Los Angeles, California, USA

=== Stuntwork ===
- Yakima Cunutt
- Ken Cooper
- Evelyn Finley (Fay McKenzie's stunt double)
- Bud Geary
- Clara Strong (Cecil Cunningham's stunt double)
- Ken Terrell
- Tex Terry (Smiley Burnette's stunt double)
- Bud Wolfe
- Joe Yrigoyen (Gene Autry's stunt double)

=== Soundtrack ===
- "Cowboy Serenade" (Rich Hall) by Gene Autry, Smiley Burnette, and cowboys, reprised with Fay McKenzie
- "Nobody Knows" (George R. Brown, Jule Styne) by Gene Autry
- "Tahiti Honey" (George R. Brown, Jule Styne, Sol Meyer) by Fay McKenzie
- "Sweethearts or Strangers" (Jimmie Davis, Lou Wayne) by Gene Autry
