= Heart of the Rio Grande =

1942 film by William Morgan

- Theatrical release poster
- Directed by: William Morgan
- Screenplay by: Lillie Hayward; Winston Miller
- Story by: Newlin B. Wildes
- Produced by: Harry Grey
- Starring: Gene Autry; Smiley Burnette; Fay McKenzie; Edith Fellows
- Cinematography: Harry Neumann
- Edited by: Lester Orlebeck
- Music by: Raoul Kraushaar (supervisor)
- Production company: Republic Pictures
- Distributed by: Republic Pictures
- Release date: March 11, 1942 (U.S.)
- Running time: 70 minutes
- Country: United States
- Language: English
- Budget: $86,115

Heart of the Rio Grande is a 1942 American Western film directed by William Morgan and starring Gene Autry, Smiley Burnette, Fay McKenzie, and Edith Fellows. Based on a story by Newlin B. Wildes, the film is about a singing cowboy and dude ranch foreman who helps a spoiled teenager and her business tycoon father discover what is most important in life. The film features the songs "Let Me Ride Down in Rocky Canyon", "Deep in the Heart of Texas", "Dusk on the Painted Desert", and "Rainbow In the Night" performed by Edith Fellows.

== Plot ==
Spoiled teenager Connie Lane (Edith Fellows) has no desire to join her classmates on a two-month vacation at the Smoke River Dude Ranch. Even her caring teacher, Alice Bennett (Fay McKenzie), is unable to persuade her. Connie runs off to her father, business tycoon Randolph Lane (Pierre Watkin), and pleads with him not to send her away. Preoccupied with business matters and too busy to notice how spoiled his daughter has become, Lane dismisses her and sends her away to spend the summer with her classmates at the ranch.

Meanwhile, Smoke River's ex-foreman, Hap Callahan (William Haade), is not pleased with the new foreman, Gene Autry (Gene Autry), and how he turned the place into a dude ranch. Gene reminds him that ranch owner "Skipper" Forbes (Sarah Padden) hired him because Hap's mismanagement drove the ranch into debt. When the train arrives at Smoke River carrying Alice and the girls, Connie bribes the porter to keep her luggage on the train. In the confusion, no one notices that Connie hasn't disembarked until the train pulls away. Gene races after the train on his horse, Champion, and brings the willful youngster back to the ranch.

While Gene and his sidekick Frog Millhouse (Smiley Burnette) compete for Alice's attention, Connie complains about being stuck on an unsophisticated ranch. Despite the best efforts of Alice, Connie quickly manages to turn everyone at the ranch against her—everyone except Gene. The next day, after Hap ignores Gene's order to fix the brakes on the ranch truck, Connie steals the vehicle in another attempt to escape. When the brakes fail and Connie's life is endangered, Gene rides to her rescue, but not before the truck crashes. Instead of being grateful, Connie is angry with Gene for preventing her escape. Looking to exact revenge, she uses lipstick to mark up her back so it looks like she's been whipped, takes photographs of her injuries, and then sends them off to her father.

Later, when she learns that Gene took responsibility for the truck's destruction, a grateful Connie tells him she wants to reward him for the favor. Gene tells her that people should do favors for each other out of friendship, not for rewards. When Gene and Hap stage a contest to determine the better rider, Connie sees her opportunity to repay the favor—she tampers with Hap's saddle. During his ride, the saddle comes loose and Hap is hurt in a fall. When Gene discovers the sabotage, Connie admits to her mischief. Angered by Connie's actions, Hap draws his gun at Gene, who fires him.

Surprised that Gene would come to her defense, Connie is finally won over, and as the weeks pass, the two become good friends. Connie's happiness is short-lived, however, when her father arrives at the dude ranch, enraged by the photographs he received from her. When he demands that she leave with him immediately, she explains that the photos were a prank, but he is unconvinced. After Frog disables his plane and Gene goads him into accompanying them on a roundup, the business tycoon decides to stay.

During the roundup, Lane discovers that he enjoys the outdoors and spending time with his daughter. As the group moves through a narrow mountain pass, Hap shoots at Gene and misses, but the sound causes the horses to stampede. Just as Connie is about to be trampled, Gene rides in and saves her. After they return to the ranch, Lane finally acknowledges that his daughter is more important than his business. Sending his secretaries away, he joins the others on a music-filled hayride.

== Cast ==
- Gene Autry as Gene Autry
- Smiley Burnette as Frog Millhouse
- Fay McKenzie as Alice Bennett
- Edith Fellows as Connie Lane
- Pierre Watkin as Randolph Lane
- Joe Strauch Jr. as Tadpole Millhouse
- William Haade as Hap Callahan
- Sarah Padden as "Skipper" Forbes
- Jean Porter as Pudge
- Jimmy Wakely Trio as Singing Ranch Hands
- Champion as Gene's Horse (uncredited)

== Production ==
=== Filming and budget ===
Heart of the Rio Grande was filmed January 9–29, 1942. The film had an operating budget of $86,115 (equal to $1,696,869 today), and a negative cost of $92,432.

=== Filming locations ===
- Bronson Canyon, Griffith Park, 4730 Crystal Springs Drive, Los Angeles, California, USA
- Chatsworth Railroad Station, Chatsworth, Los Angeles, USA
- Iverson Ranch, 1 Iverson Lane, Chatsworth, Los Angeles, California, USA
- Janss Ranch, Conejo Valley, California, USA
- Morrison Ranch, Agoura Hills, California, USA
- Republic Pictures Backlot, Studio City, Los Angeles, California, USA

=== Stuntwork ===
- Yakima Cunutt
- Ken Cooper
- Evelyn Finley (Fay McKenzie's stunt double)
- Bud Geary
- Clara Strong (Cecil Cunningham's stunt double)
- Ken Terrell
- Tex Terry (Smiley Burnette's stunt double)
- Bud Wolfe
- Joe Yrigoyen (Gene Autry's stunt double)

=== Propaganda ===
Like many war-time films, "doing their part for the war", this one includes a short scene wherein Autry suggests to his ranch hands, after he pays them their wages, that instead of losing their money playing poker, that they might want to buy war bonds.

=== Soundtrack ===
- "Let Me Ride Down in Rocky Canyon" (Gene Autry, Ray Whitley, Fred Rose) by Gene Autry and the cowboys
- "Deep in the Heart of Texas" (Don Swander, June Hershey) by Gene Autry, Smiley Burnette, and Joe Strauch Jr.
- "Dusk on the Painted Desert" (Al Frisch, Don George, Helen Bernard) by Gene Autry
- "Oh Woe Is Me" (Smiley Burnette) by Smiley Burnette
- "A Rumble Seat For Two" (Johnny Marvin, Frankie Marvin) by Gene Autry
- "Rancho Pillow" (Charles Newman, Allie Wrubel) by Gene Autry and the Jimmy Wakely Trio
- "Rainbow In the Night" (Sol Meyer, Jule Styne) by Edith Fellows
- "Cimarron" (Johnny Bond) by the Jimmy Wakely Trio
- "I'll Wait For You" (Gene Autry, Fred Rose) by Gene Autry and Fay McKenzie
