= Girls' School (1938 film) =

1938 film by John Brahm

- Theatrical poster
- Directed by: John Brahm
- Written by: Tess Slesinger (story); Richard Sherman
- Starring: Anne Shirley
- Cinematography: Franz Planer
- Edited by: Otto Meyer
- Music by: Gregory Stone
- Distributed by: Columbia Pictures
- Release date: September 30, 1938
- Running time: 72 minutes
- Country: United States
- Language: English

Girls' School is a 1938 American teen drama film starring Anne Shirley. The film was directed by John Brahm and based upon a Tess Slesinger story. Morris Stoloff and Gregory Stone were nominated for the Academy Award for Best Music, Scoring.

== Plot ==
The film revolves around wealthy high school teenagers who are sent to Magnolia Hall, a boarding school to learn proper etiquette. One of the girls causes a scandal when she stays out all night, then announces on planning to elope with a boy. She gets in trouble when the faculty finds out through a monitor's report from a reluctant poor girl attending on scholarship.

== Cast ==
- Anne Shirley as Natalie Freeman
- Ralph Bellamy as Michael Hendragin
- Nan Grey as Linda Simpson
- Dorothy Moore as Betty Fleet
- Gloria Holden as Miss Laurel
- Marjorie Main as Miss Honore Armstrong
- Cecil Cunningham as Miss Brewster, Dean of Students
- Doris Kenyon as Mrs. Howard
- Margaret Tallichet as Gwennie
- Peggy Moran as Myra
