= Bob McKenzie (actor) =

American actor (1880–1949)

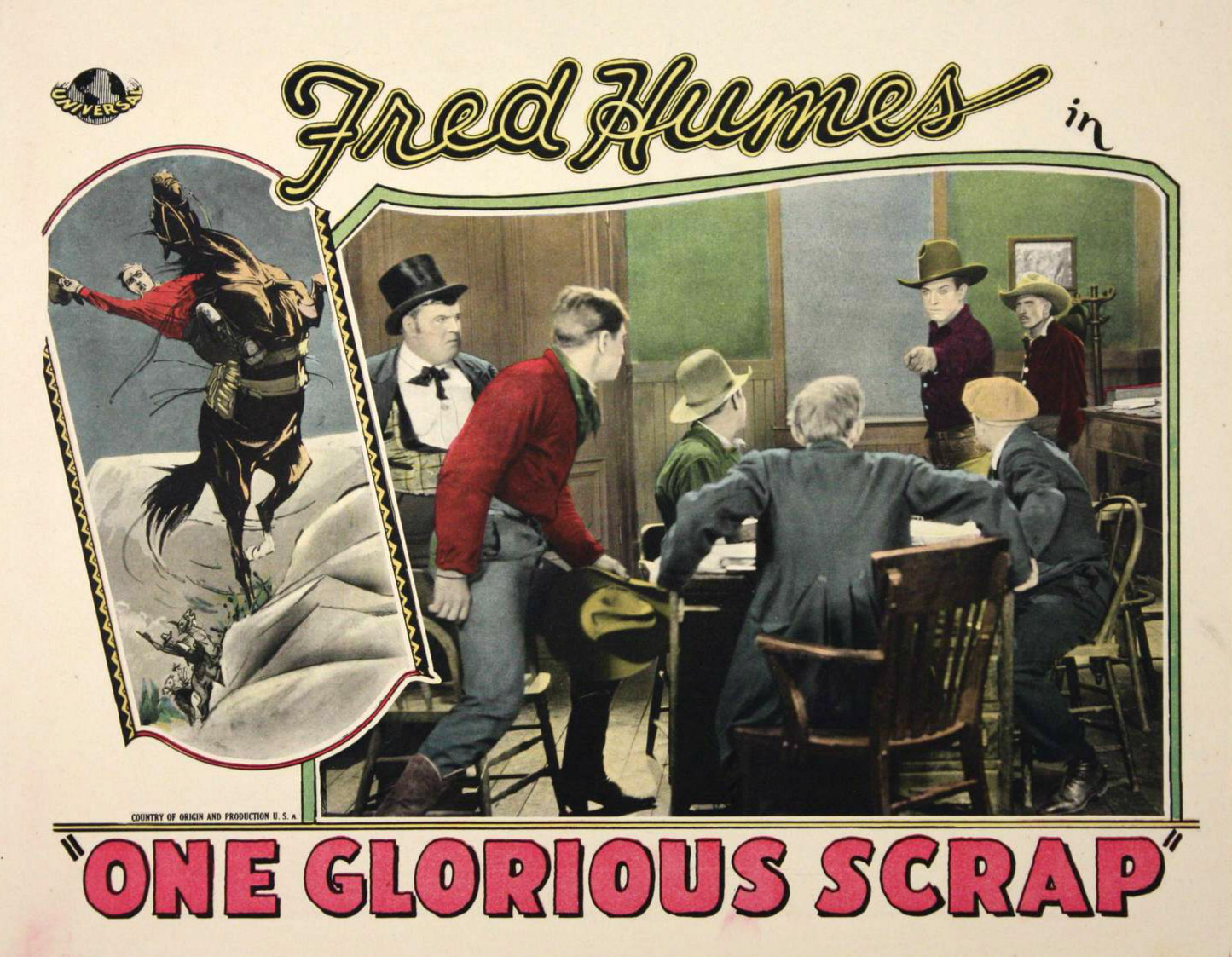
- Lobby card for One Glorious Scrap (1927) with McKenzie in top hat at left
- Born: September 22, 1880; County Antrim, Ireland
- Died: July 8, 1949 (aged 68); Matunuck, Rhode Island, United States
- Occupation: Actor
- Years active: 1915–1949
- Spouse(s): Eva McKenzie (m. 19??)
- Children: 3, including Fay McKenzie

Robert McKenzie (September 22, 1880 – July 8, 1949) was an Irish-born American film actor. He appeared in more than 310 films between 1915 and 1946. McKenzie was married to the actress Eva McKenzie until his death from a heart attack in 1949. The two appeared as husband and wife in The Three Stooges' film The Yoke's on Me. He and Eva were the parents of actress daughters Fay McKenzie, Ida Mae McKenzie and Ella McKenzie.

== Selected filmography ==
- Shoulder Arms (1918)
- Don Quickshot of the Rio Grande (1923)
- Where is This West? (1923)
- The Covered Trail (1924)
- Bad Man's Bluff (1926)
- Set Free (1927)
- The White Outlaw (1929)
- See America Thirst (1930)
- Hook, Line and Sinker (1930)
- Cimarron (1931)
- Guilty Hands (1931)
- The Half-Naked Truth (1932)
- I'm No Angel (1933)
- Tillie and Gus (1933)
- Broadway Bill (1934)
- The Little Minister (1934)
- The Witching Hour (1934)
- The Old Fashioned Way (1934)
- You're Telling Me! (1934)
- Frontier Days (1934)
- Naughty Marietta (1935)
- Mississippi (1935)
- Life Begins at 40 (1935)
- Diamond Jim (1935)
- The Man from Guntown (1935)
- Annie Oakley (1935)
- San Francisco (1936)
- Ridin' On (1936)
- Senor Jim (1936)
- The Man Who Found Himself (1937)
- The Road Back (1937)
- Wells Fargo (1937)
- Luck of Roaring Camp (1937)
- Young Fugitives (1938)
- The Adventures of Tom Sawyer (1938)
- Billy the Kid Returns (1938)
- Zenobia (1939)
- Allegheny Uprising (1939)
- Destry Rides Again (1939)
- My Little Chickadee (1940)
- Saps at Sea (1940)
- Anne of Windy Poplars (1940)
- The Return of Frank James (1940)
- Dance, Girl, Dance (1940)
- Santa Fe Trail (1940)
- A Girl, a Guy, and a Gob (1941)
- The Spoilers (1942)
- Syncopation (1942)
- In Old California (1942)
- First Comes Courage (1943)
- Destroyer (1943)
- A Lady Takes a Chance (1943)
- Can't Help Singing (1944)
- Harmony Trail (1944)
- Tall in the Saddle (1944)
- The Strange Affair of Uncle Harry (1945)
- Night and Day (1946)
- Duel in the Sun (1946)
