= Tom Waldman =

American screenwriter (1922–1985)

- Born: Thomas Waldman; July 8, 1922; Chicago, Illinois, U.S.
- Died: July 23, 1985 (aged 63); Chapel Hill, North Carolina, U.S.
- Occupation: TV/film screenwriter
- Years active: 1952–1982
- Spouse: Fay McKenzie (1948 - 1985) (his death)

Tom Waldman (July 8, 1922 – July 23, 1985) was an American screenwriter whose credits included Inspector Clouseau, Trail of the Pink Panther and The Party, both in collaboration with Blake Edwards, and episodes of popular TV series such as McHale's Navy, I Dream of Jeannie, Gilligan's Island, Peter Gunn and Bewitched. He frequently collaborated on scripts with his brother Frank. The Waldman brothers were the sole credited writers of the script for the 41st Academy Awards.

== Personal life ==
He was married to the actress and singer Fay McKenzie. He died in 1985 aged 63 of cancer.
