= The Singing Sheriff =

1944 film directed by Leslie Goodwins

- Theatrical release poster
- Directed by: Leslie Goodwins
- Screenplay by: Henry Blankfort; Eugene Conrad
- Story by: John Grey
- Produced by: Bernard W. Burton
- Starring: Bob Crosby; Fay McKenzie; Fuzzy Knight; Iris Adrian; Samuel S. Hinds; Edward Norris; Andrew Tombes; Joe Sawyer
- Cinematography: Charles Van Enger
- Edited by: Edward Curtiss
- Production company: Universal Pictures
- Distributed by: Universal Pictures
- Release date: October 6, 1944
- Running time: 63 minutes
- Country: United States
- Language: English

The Singing Sheriff is a 1944 American Western comedy film directed by Leslie Goodwins and written by Henry Blankfort and Eugene Conrad. The film stars Bob Crosby, Fay McKenzie, Fuzzy Knight, Iris Adrian, Samuel S. Hinds, Edward Norris, Andrew Tombes and Joe Sawyer. The film was released on October 6, 1944, by Universal Pictures.

== Cast ==
- Bob Crosby as Bob Richards
- Fay McKenzie as Caroline
- Fuzzy Knight as Fuzzy
- Iris Adrian as Lefty
- Samuel S. Hinds as Seth
- Edward Norris as Vance
- Andrew Tombes as Jonas
- Joe Sawyer as Squint
- Walter Sande as Butch
- Doodles Weaver as Ivory
- Pat Starling as Showgirl
- Louis DaPron as Louis
- Spade Cooley as himself
