= Stranger on the Third Floor =

1940 film by Boris Ingster

- theatrical release poster
- Directed by: Boris Ingster
- Screenplay by: Frank Partos; Nathanael West (uncredited)
- Story by: Frank Partos
- Produced by: Lee S. Marcus
- Starring: Peter Lorre; John McGuire; Margaret Tallichet; Charles Waldron
- Cinematography: Nicholas Musuraca
- Edited by: Harry Marker
- Music by: Roy Webb
- Production company: RKO Radio Pictures
- Distributed by: RKO Radio Pictures
- Release date: August 16, 1940 (US)
- Running time: 62 or 66-67 minutes
- Country: United States
- Language: English
- Budget: $171,200 (estimated)

Stranger on the Third Floor is a 1940 American film noir directed by Boris Ingster in his directorial debut and starring Peter Lorre, John McGuire, Margaret Tallichet, and Charles Waldron, and featuring Elisha Cook Jr. It was written by Frank Partos. Modern research has shown that Nathanael West wrote the final version of the screenplay, but was uncredited.

Stranger on the Third Floor is often cited as the first "true" film noir of the classic period (1940–1959), though other films that fit the genre such as Rebecca and They Drive by Night were released earlier. Nonetheless, it has many of the hallmarks of film noir: an urban setting, heavy shadows, diagonal lines, voice-over narration, a dream sequence, low camera angles shooting up multi-story staircases, and an innocent protagonist desperate to clear himself after being falsely accused of a crime.

== Plot ==
Reporter Michael Ward is the key witness in a murder trial. His evidence – that he saw the accused, Joe Briggs, standing over the body of a man in a diner – is instrumental in having Briggs found guilty.

Afterwards, Ward's fiancée Jane begins worrying that Ward may not have been correct in what he saw; eventually Ward becomes haunted by this question.

One evening, outside his room in the house where he lives, Ward sees an odd-looking stranger. He chases this man down the stairs and out the front door where Ward loses track of him. Ward feels that his neighbor, a man he hates, may have been killed by the stranger. Ward has a terrifying dream in which the neighbor is indeed murdered and he comes under suspicion.

It turns out the neighbor was killed the same way as the man in the diner. Ward finds the body, notifies police and points out the similarities in the two murders. He is arrested and, in order to clear him, Jane sets out to find the strange man. After a string of people with no knowledge of the strange man, Jane discovers him at Jack's (formerly Nick's) Diner. She follows him out and learns that he seems to have escaped from a mental asylum. He confesses that he murdered both men because he believed they would send him back. Jane tries to escape and warn the police, but the strange man chases her. He seems intent to kill her but is struck by a truck during the chase. The police recognize that this is the man they had been searching for, and the strange man dies, having avoided being sent back.

Ward and Jane head to city hall to be officially married. Joe Briggs, having been cleared, drives their taxicab.

== Cast ==
- Peter Lorre as The Stranger
- John McGuire as Mike Ward
- Margaret Tallichet as Jane
- Charles Waldron as District Attorney
- Elisha Cook Jr. as Joe Briggs
- Charles Halton as Albert Meng
- Ethel Griffies as Mrs. Kane, Michael's landlady
- Cliff Clark as Martin
- Oscar O'Shea as the Judge
- Alec Craig as Briggs' Defense Attorney
- Emory Parnell as Detective
- Max Hoffman, Jr. as Cab Driver Charlie

Margaret Tallichet, who played Jane, married film director William Wyler on October 23, 1938, at the home of actor Walter Huston and continued to make films, including Stranger on the Third Floor in 1940. She made two more films, then retired from acting.

== Production ==
Stranger on the Third Floor was Boris Ingster's directorial debut. Ingster, who was born in Latvia, was formerly a writer, and an associate of noted Russian director Sergei Eisenstein. Ingster would later become a television producer. He directed only three feature films in his career.

In the introduction to Turner Classic Movies' Noir Alley presentation of the film, Eddie Muller compared the style of the film to that of German Expressionist films. Jeremy Arnold writes that the film's "extraordinary look and tone are the product of stylized sets, bizarre angles and lighting, and a powerful blurring of dream and reality – qualities strongly influenced by German expressionist films of the 1920s." Robert Portfino called it "a distinct break in style and substance with the preceding mystery, crime, detection and horror films of the 1930s." In their book Kings of the Bs, Todd McCarthy and Charles Flynn wrote that Stranger on the Third Floor "is extremely audacious in terms of what it seeks to say about American society...The trial of the ex-con is a vicious rendering of the American legal system hard at work on an impoverished victim...[T]he sinister role of police and prosecutors in obtaining confessions and convictions [are] hallmarks of the hard-boiled literature that paralleled and predicted what we call film noir."

Van Nest Polglase, who has been called "one of the most influential production designers in American cinema", was the film's art director. He had previously worked on King Kong in 1933 and The Hunchback of Notre Dame in 1939, and worked on the sets for Citizen Kane. His work on Stranger on the Third Floor "contributes mightily to the claustrophobic feel of the movie." Muller calls his work on this film "spectacular". In addition, the work of special effects artist Vernon L. Walker was excellent despite the constraints of a B movie budget, and the score of Roy Webb, who was RKO's house composer at the time, contributes significantly to the film's mood.

== Reception ==
Upon its release in 1940, Bosley Crowther of The New York Times called the film pretentious and derivative of French and Russian films, and wrote "John McGuire and Margaret Tallichet, as the reporter and his girl, are permitted to act half-way normal, it is true. But in every other respect, including Peter Lorre's brief role as the whack, it is utterly wild. The notion seems to have been that the way to put a psychological melodrama across is to pile on the sound effects and trick up the photography."

The staff writer at Variety also believed the film was derivative, and wrote "The familiar artifice of placing the scribe in parallel plight, with the newspaperman arrested for two slayings and only clearing himself because of his sweetheart's persistent search for the real slayer, is used...Boris Ingster's direction is too studied and when original, lacks the flare to hold attention. It's a film too arty for average audiences, and too humdrum for others."

Dave Kehr of the Chicago Reader wrote: "An RKO B-film from 1940, done up in high Hollywood expressionism. It's absurdly overwrought (which was often the problem with the German variety), but interesting for it. The director, Boris Ingster, is better with shadows than with actors – venetian blinds carve up the characters with more fateful force than Paul Schrader's similar gambit in American Gigolo, and there's a dream sequence that has to be seen to be disbelieved."

Another film reviewer, P.S. Harrison, wrote that "at [the film's] conclusion, one feels as if one had gone through a nightmare." Eddie Muller pointed out that it "was the first Hollywood film to fully display the look later described as noir ... The Stranger on the Third Floor expressed the grimmest theme in noir: the cruelty of fate. Doesn't matter if you're innocent. Justice truly is blind, but not because she's impartial: Either God's poked her eyes out or she's taking a payoff to look the other way. This is Blind Alley, the cruelest part of a merciless town."

On Rotten Tomatoes, the film holds an approval rating of 75%, based on 28 professional reviews with the consensus summarizing: "While it suffers from the occasional stilted performance, Stranger on the Third Floor turns its gripping premise into a visually persuasive noir nightmare through bold production design and Boris Ingster's striking direction."
