= Eva McKenzie =

American film actress (1889–1967)

- Born: Eva Belle Heazlit; November 5, 1889; Toledo, Ohio; U.S.
- Died: September 15, 1967 (aged 77); Hollywood, California; U.S.
- Years active: 1915–1944
- Spouse(s): Robert McKenzie (m. 19??)
- Children: 3, including Fay McKenzie

Eva McKenzie (November 5, 1889 – September 15, 1967) born as Eva Belle Heazlit, was an American film and stage actress. She appeared in over 150 films — many of them Westerns — between 1915 and 1944.

McKenzie was married to the actor Robert McKenzie until his death in 1949. The two appeared as husband and wife in The Three Stooges' film The Yoke's on Me (1944) Their three daughters were the actresses Ida Mae McKenzie, Ella McKenzie and Fay McKenzie.

Heazlit appeared with her husband and two of their daughters (Ida Mae and Ella) in Laff That Off (1928), The four were members of a theatre company, the Broadway Players, and all appeared in two 1928 stage plays, Nothing But the Truth and Little Orphan Annie. A newspaper review of Nothing But the Truth noted that "Eva Heazlit is usually called upon to overact, but she has achieved a certain popularity thru her willingness and enthusiasm."

Heazlit wrote the silent western comedy films A Knight of the West (1921), and Freshwater Jack (1921), both directed by her husband.

== Selected filmography ==
- The Man from Guntown (1935)
- Pioneer Trail (1938)
- Oily to Bed, Oily to Rise (1939)
- The Yoke's on Me (1944)
