= David Tallichet =

American businessman (1922–2007)

- Born: David Compton Tallichet Jr. December 20, 1922; Dallas, Texas, U.S.
- Died: October 31, 2007 (aged 84); Orange, California, U.S.
- Education: Sewanee: The University of the South; University of Texas at Dallas; Southern Methodist University
- Occupation: Businessman
- Known for: Starting theme restaurants
- Spouse(s): Cecilia Dennis (divorced) Carol Schmidt (m. 1984)
- Children: 4
- Relatives: Margaret Tallichet (sister)

David Compton Tallichet Jr. (December 20, 1922 – October 31, 2007) was an American businessman who started, but did not originate, themed restaurants. He also owned scores of classic military aircraft.

== Early life ==
Born in Dallas, Texas, Tallichet graduated from the University of the South in Tennessee, the University of Texas at Dallas; he later attended Southern Methodist University in Texas, but left before completing his English degree.

== US Army Air Forces ==
Joining the United States Army Air Forces, he was deployed to Europe during World War II, initially flying as co-pilot on a Boeing B-17 Flying Fortress. His crew became part of the 350th Bombardment Squadron, which in February 1945 joined the 100th Bombardment Group, based at RAF Thorpe Abbotts. He flew more than 20 missions in an aircraft called Spirit of Pittwood. After the war, Tallichet flew transport aircraft in Europe.

After mustering out of active service, he joined the New Mexico Air National Guard, flying the P-51 Mustang. Tallichet remained on active reserve status in the United States Air Force until 1957.

== Career ==
After he left the Army, Tallichet joined Hilton Hotels. In 1955, he was managing the Lafayette Hotel in Long Beach, California, which hosted a Miss Universe beauty pageant; he later married the contestant from Indiana.

=== Restaurants ===
In 1958, Tallichet and SeaWorld founder George Millay formed Specialty Restaurants Corporation, a destination-restaurant business. Their first location was Polynesian-themed Reef in Long Beach, California; the second was Castaway in Burbank, California. Ultimately, Tallichet designed, financed, or built more than 100 restaurants across the United States, including the Proud Bird next to Los Angeles International Airport and 94th Aero Squadron near Van Nuys Airport. Many designs were shaped by Tallichet's experience as a military aviator.

=== Military Aircraft Restoration Corp ===
Inspired by a trip to the Smithsonian National Air and Space Museum in the early 1960s, he began to buy vintage aircraft. His first purchases were: a P-51 Mustang for $13,000; a B-25 Mitchell bomber; a Korean War MiG jet; a P-40 Tomahawk; a B-29 bomber; and a Martin B-26 Marauder. Tallichet formed Military Aircraft Restoration Corp., a subsidiary of the restaurant company, to manage his collection. Many of the organization's later aircraft were recovered wrecks from the Pacific Ocean, often around Papua New Guinea.

On hearing about the proposed production of the movie Memphis Belle, Tallichet offered to fly his own B-17 across the Atlantic Ocean for filming.

At its peak in the mid-1990s, his collection included more than 120 aircraft. He slowly reduced his holdings, and owned around 50 at his death.

The company also made replica classic military aircraft for use as props in films, including Pearl Harbor and Collateral Damage, and later produced entrance themes for aircraft museums.

== Personal life ==
Tallichet was married to Cecilia Dennis. They lived in Long Beach, then Newport Beach. They had four children: John, Catherine Ann, William (Bill), James and grandchildren Ashley, Catherine, Bryan, and Lauren. They divorced. He married Carol Schmidt in 1984, and they remained married for the remainder of his life. His sister, film actress Margaret Tallichet, was married to film director William Wyler.

Tallichet died at his home in Orange, California, of complications from prostate cancer, at age 84, on October 31, 2007.
