= A Desperate Adventure (1938 film) =

1938 film by John H. Auer

- Theatrical release poster
- Directed by: John H. Auer
- Screenplay by: Barry Trivers
- Story by: Hanns Kräly; M. Coates Webster
- Produced by: John H. Auer
- Starring: Ramon Novarro; Marian Marsh; Eric Blore; Andrew Tombes; Margaret Tallichet; Tom Rutherford
- Cinematography: Jack A. Marta
- Edited by: Ernest J. Nims; Murray Seldeen
- Music by: Cy Feuer; William Lava
- Production company: Republic Pictures
- Distributed by: Republic Pictures
- Release date: August 6, 1938
- Running time: 67 minutes
- Country: United States
- Language: English

A Desperate Adventure is a 1938 American comedy film directed by John H. Auer and written by Barry Trivers. The film stars Ramon Novarro, Marian Marsh, Eric Blore, Andrew Tombes, Margaret Tallichet and Tom Rutherford. The film was released on August 6, 1938, by Republic Pictures.

== Cast ==
- Ramon Novarro as André Friezan
- Marian Marsh as Ann Carrington
- Eric Blore as Trump
- Andrew Tombes as Cosmo Carrington
- Margaret Tallichet as Betty Carrington
- Tom Rutherford as Gerald Richards
- Maurice Cass as Dornay
- Ernő Verebes as Marcel
- Michael Kent as Maurice
- Cliff Nazarro as Tipo
- Rolfe Sedan as Prefect of Police
- Gloria Rich as Mimi
- Lois Collier as Angela
