= Fay McKenzie =

American actress and singer (1918–2019)

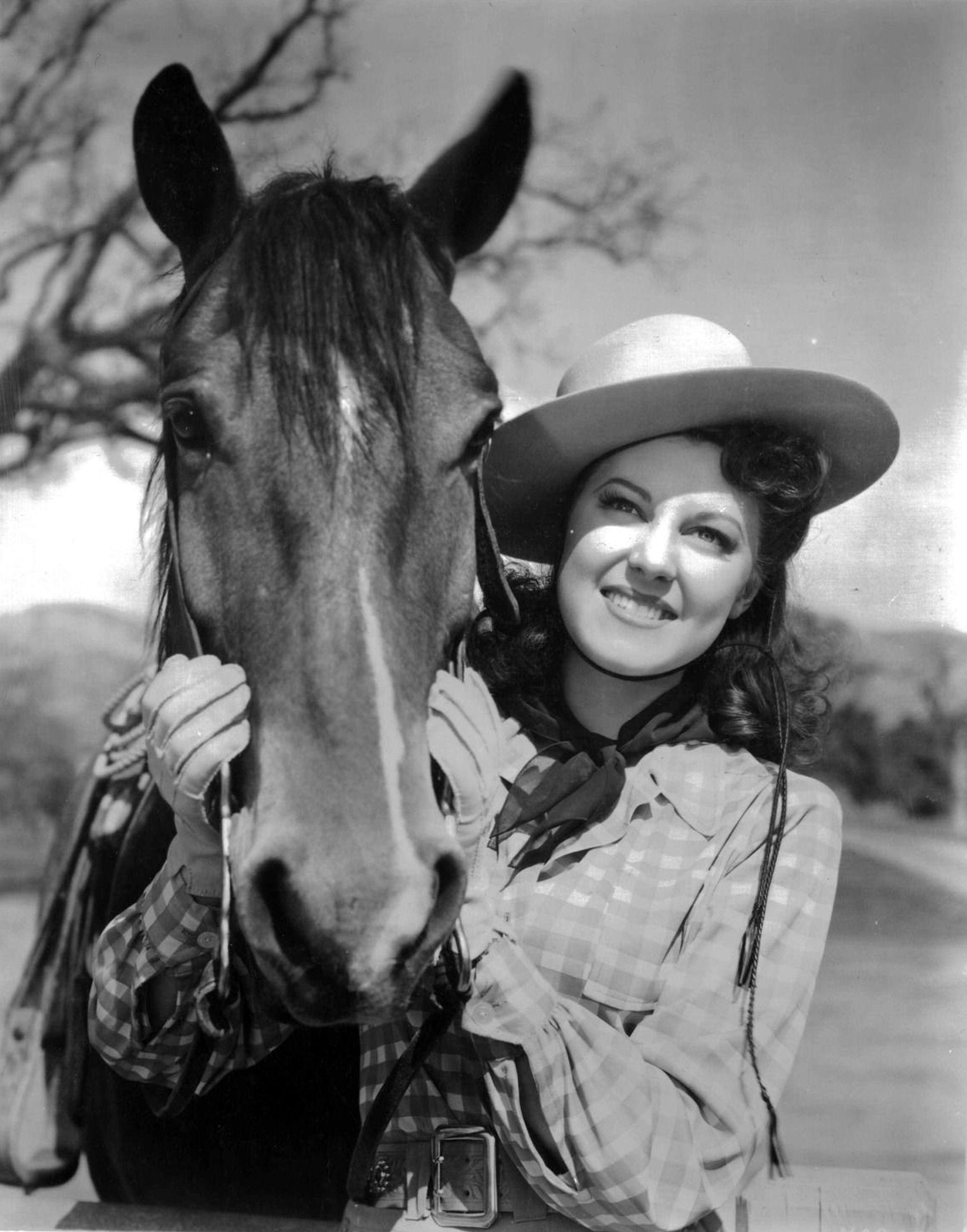
- Fay McKenzie, in a publicity photo c. 1940s
- Born: Eunice Fay McKenzie; February 19, 1918; Hollywood, California, U.S.
- Died: April 16, 2019 (aged 101); Highland Park, Los Angeles, California, U.S.
- Other names: Fay Shannon
- Occupations: Actress, singer
- Years active: 1918–2018
- Spouses: Steve Cochran (m. 1946; div. 1948) Tom Waldman (m. 1948; died 1985)
- Children: 2

Eunice Fay McKenzie (February 19, 1918 – April 16, 2019) was an American actress and singer. She starred in silent films as a child, and then sound films as an adult, but perhaps she is best known for her leading roles opposite Gene Autry in the early 1940s in five horse opera features. She was also known for her collaborations with director Blake Edwards on five occasions.

She also appeared on Broadway, radio, and television, having appeared on screen at ten weeks old in 1918. She was still appearing on screen at the time of her death, with her latest project opposite her son Tom Waldman Jr. in the comedy Kill a Better Mousetrap, based on a play by Scott K. Ratner, filmed in the summer of 2018 and not yet released at the time of her death, making her one of the few actors with a career spanning 100 years. She was briefly billed as Fay Shannon.

== Biography ==
=== Early life and silent film ===
McKenzie was born on February 19, 1918, in Hollywood, California, to show business parents, film actor Eva (née Heazlitt) and Irish American actor/director Robert McKenzie. Her father had a stock company called the McKenzie Merry Makers, and was both an actor and director in stage productions and films. His company included such actors as Broncho Billy Anderson, Ben Turpin, and Victor Potel. When she was ten weeks old, she appeared in an uncredited part in the film Station Content (1918) as Kitty's baby (played by Gloria Swanson). She appeared in four other silent films as a child: A Knight of the West (1921) as Fray Murten, When Love Comes (1922) as Ruth, The Judgment of the Storm (1924) as a Heath Twin, and The Dramatic Life of Abraham Lincoln (1924) as a young Sarah Lincoln (Abraham Lincoln's stepmother). Fay's sister Ida Mae McKenzie, cousin Ella McKenzie, and brother-in-law Billy Gilbert, were also actors. Ida Mae also played the character of Sarah Lincoln in The Dramatic Life of Abraham Lincoln, in the part of the film where she had become a teenager.

=== Schooling ===
In the mid-1920s, McKenzie took a ten-year break from acting in order to focus on her education. She attended the Beverly Hills High School. She returned to films in 1934 in Student Tour as Mary Lou. That year she made her first short Western film, Sundown Trail, with Wally Wales. McKenzie later recalled,

Oh my gosh, my first grown up role. My father took me. He knew everybody, and I got the job. Even though I was only 15 years old! We shot that in three days, and there was no script. They'd all ride one way and say this, then they'd all ride the other way and say that. It was very improvisational, but a great event in my life.

=== Sound films ===
McKenzie appeared in numerous uncredited roles throughout the 1930s, with occasional credited roles in films such as The Boss Cowboy (1934) as Sally Nolan, and the anti-cannabis propaganda film Assassin of Youth (1937) as Linda Clayton. In 1938, she began to appear mainly in Western films, such as Ghost Town Riders (1938) as Molly Taylor (credited as Fay Shannon), and When the Daltons Rode (1940) as Hannah. She had a small part in the 1939 film Gunga Din, which was inducted by the United States Library of Congress for preservation in the National Film Registry in 1999 with the motivation of being "culturally significant". In 1940, McKenzie appeared in the stage show Meet the People, which premiered in Los Angeles and ended up on Broadway.

=== Films with Gene Autry ===
In 1941, the president of Republic Pictures, Herbert Yates, met McKenzie through a mutual friend, and after a screen test he signed her to a contract to appear opposite the cowboy singer Gene Autry in Down Mexico Way (1941) as Maria Elena Alvarado. The film was a major financial success, and she received a lot of fan mail as a result. McKenzie went on to appear in four additional Autry films as his leading lady: Sierra Sue (1941) as Sue Larrabee, Cowboy Serenade (1942) as Stephanie Lock, Heart of the Rio Grande (1942) as Alice Bennett, and Home in Wyomin' (1942) as Clementine Benson. McKenzie sang duets with Autry in each of these films. She later remembered:

I loved working with Gene, he was terrific! I could sing and that was something the earlier girls couldn't do. Yates knew I had done Broadway; that helped! I could do more than smile and wave at the cowboy!

=== Theater and touring ===
During World War II, McKenzie left Republic Pictures to work in theater and pursue other projects. She appeared in A Midsummer Night's Dream and later appeared in Broadway in Burlesque with Bert Lahr. Much of her time during the war was devoted to shows and public appearances to support the war effort—working for the Hollywood Victory Committee. McKenzie also toured extensively entertaining the troops alongside Bob Hope, Bing Crosby, Cary Grant, James Cagney, and old family friends Laurel and Hardy. She also entertained the troops with her former screen partner, Gene Autry.

=== Later career ===
After World War II, McKenzie retired from films to raise her two children. In the 1950s, she traveled to New York to study with Lee Strasberg at the Actors Studio, appeared on radio shows with Groucho Marx, and toured with the songwriter Harry Ruby. She appeared in the television series The Millionaire (1959) as Ruth Spencer, Mr. Lucky (1960) as Sheila Wells, The Tom Ewell Show (1960) as Emma Franklin, and Bonanza (1961) as Victoria Gates. In the 1960s, McKenzie returned to film in Breakfast at Tiffany's (1961) in a minor role and The Party (1968) as Alice Clutterbuck. She made her final screen appearance in S.O.B. (1981) as a favor to her old family friend Blake Edwards. In 2018, McKenzie had a cameo appearance in the film "Kill A Better Mousetrap," which resulted in her film appearances spanning 100 years.

== Personal life ==
McKenzie was married twice. Her first marriage to the American actor Steve Cochran in Acapulco, Mexico, in January 1946, ended in divorce in 1948, although they had separated nine months into the marriage. Her parents' disapproval of him was cited as one of the reasons. Her second marriage to the screenwriter Tom Waldman lasted from 1948 to his death on July 23, 1985. They had two children: the actor Tom Waldman Jr. and the writer Madora McKenzie. McKenzie was a Christian Scientist. Her brother-in-law was the actor and comedian Billy Gilbert

=== Death ===
McKenzie died peacefully of natural causes in her sleep in Highland Park, Los Angeles on April 16, 2019. She was 101.

== Filmography ==
Year	Title	Role
1918	Station Content	Baby in Arms (uncredited)
1921	A Knight of the West	Fray Murten
1922	When Love Comes	Ruth
1924	The Judgment of the Storm	Heath Twin
1924	The Dramatic Life of Abraham Lincoln	Sarah Lincoln
1934	The Boss Cowboy	Sally Nolan
1934	Ferocious Pal	Girl at Dog Fight
1934	Sundown Trail	Mickey Moore
1934	Student Tour	Mary Lou
1935	Arizona Bad Man	Girl at Barn Dance
1935	Lawless Riders	Girl in Candy Kisses Booth
1935	Thunderbolt	Annie
1936	Lucky Terror	Young Girl Spectator
1936	Ride 'Em Cowboy	Stamp Buyer
1937	Assassin of Youth	Linda Clayton
1937	Tex Rides with the Boy Scouts	Girl at the Dance
1938	Swingtime in the Movies	Girl from Dallas
1938	Freshman Year	Student
1938	Slander House	Anna
1938	Ghost Town Riders	Molly Taylor
1939	Gunga Din	Girl at Party
1939	Man of Conquest	Young Lady
1939	It's a Wonderful World	Guest
1939	Unexpected Father	Chorus Girl
1939	What a Life	Student in Lunchroom
1939	Disputed Passage	Nurse
1939	Little Accident	Woman
1939	Laugh It Off	Chorus Girl
1939	Death Rides the Range	Letty Morgan
1939	All Women Have Secrets	Martha
1939	The Big Guy	Waitress
1940	Ma! He's Making Eyes at Me	Brooklyn Girl
1940	It's a Date	Young Girl
1940	Mad Youth	Escort Girl
1940	Love, Honor, and Oh Baby!	Waitress
1940	When the Daltons Rode	Hannah
1941	Dr. Kildare's Wedding Day	Nurse
1941	Down Mexico Way	Maria Elena Alvarado
1941	Sierra Sue	Sue Larrabee
1942	Cowboy Serenade	Stephanie Lock
1942	Heart of the Rio Grande	Alice Bennett
1942	Home in Wyomin'	Clementine Benson
1942	Remember Pearl Harbor	Marcia Porter
1944	The Singing Sheriff	Caroline
1946	Murder in the Music Hall	Singer in Mom's Café
1946	Night and Day	Singer
1959	-30-	Mrs. Jason
1961	Breakfast at Tiffany's	Party Guest Laughing in Mirror
1962	Experiment in Terror	Hospital Superintendent (uncredited)
1968	The Party	Alice Clutterbuck
1981	S.O.B.	Woman on the Beach
2018	Kill a Better Mousetrap	

== See also ==
- List of centenarians (actors, filmmakers and entertainers)
