= Margaret Tallichet =

American actress (1914–1991)

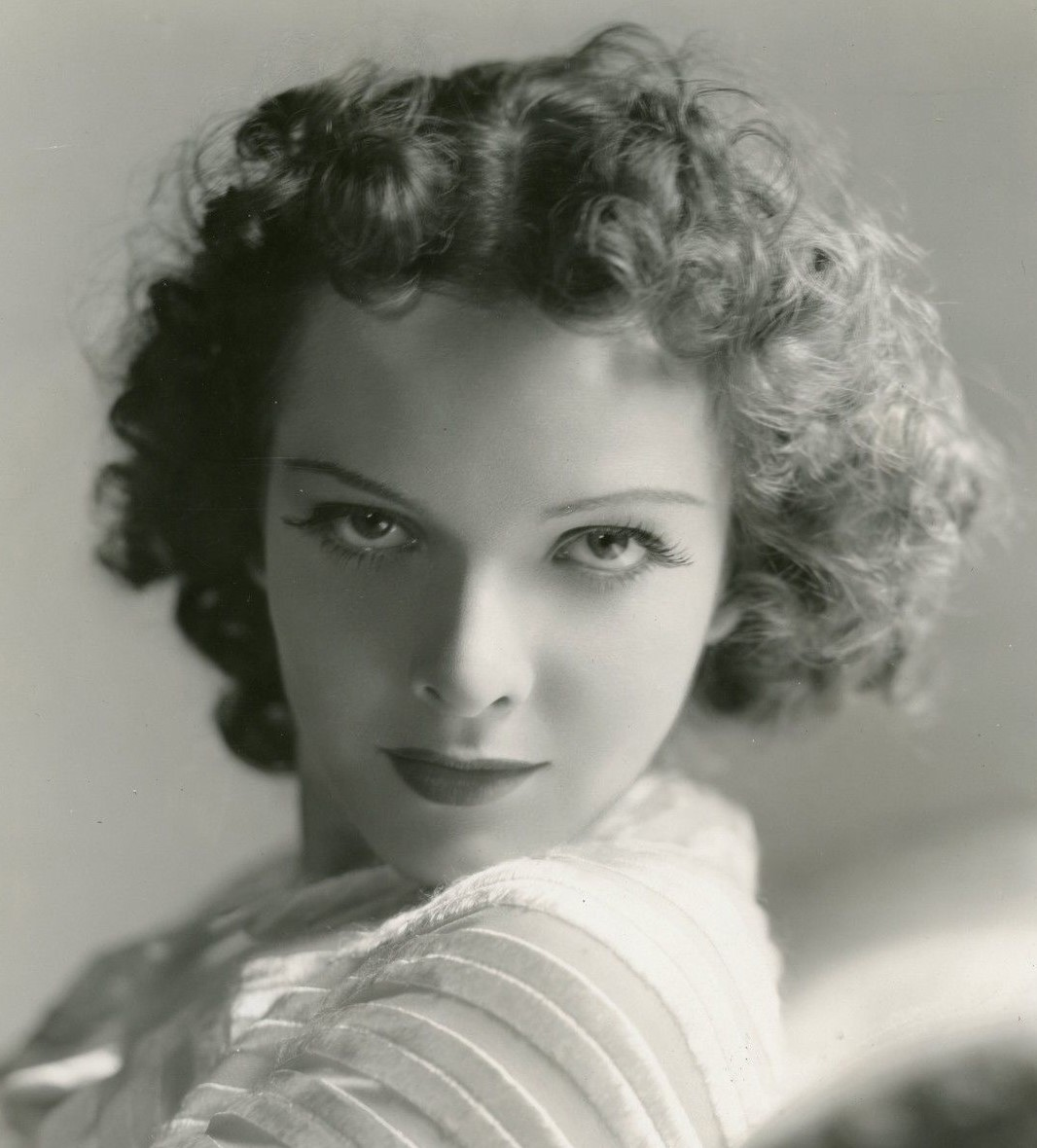
- Tallichet in 1937
- Born: March 13, 1914; Dallas, Texas, U.S.
- Died: May 3, 1991 (aged 77); Los Angeles, California, U.S.
- Education: Southern Methodist University
- Occupation: Actress
- Spouse: William Wyler (m. 1938; died 1981)
- Children: 5
- Relatives: David Tallichet Jr. (brother)

Margaret "Talli" Tallichet (March 13, 1914 – May 3, 1991) was an American actress and longtime wife of movie director William Wyler. Her best-known leading role was with Peter Lorre in the film noir Stranger on the Third Floor (1940).

== Background ==
She was the great-granddaughter of Albert Tallichet, an antebellum émigré from Switzerland who settled in the town of Demopolis, Alabama, where he ran a grocery store. Her parents, David Compton Tallichet and Margaret Tallichet, moved from Alabama to Dallas, Texas before her birth. Margaret graduated from Southern Methodist University. She was an active member of Alpha Omicron Pi sorority.

== Movie career ==
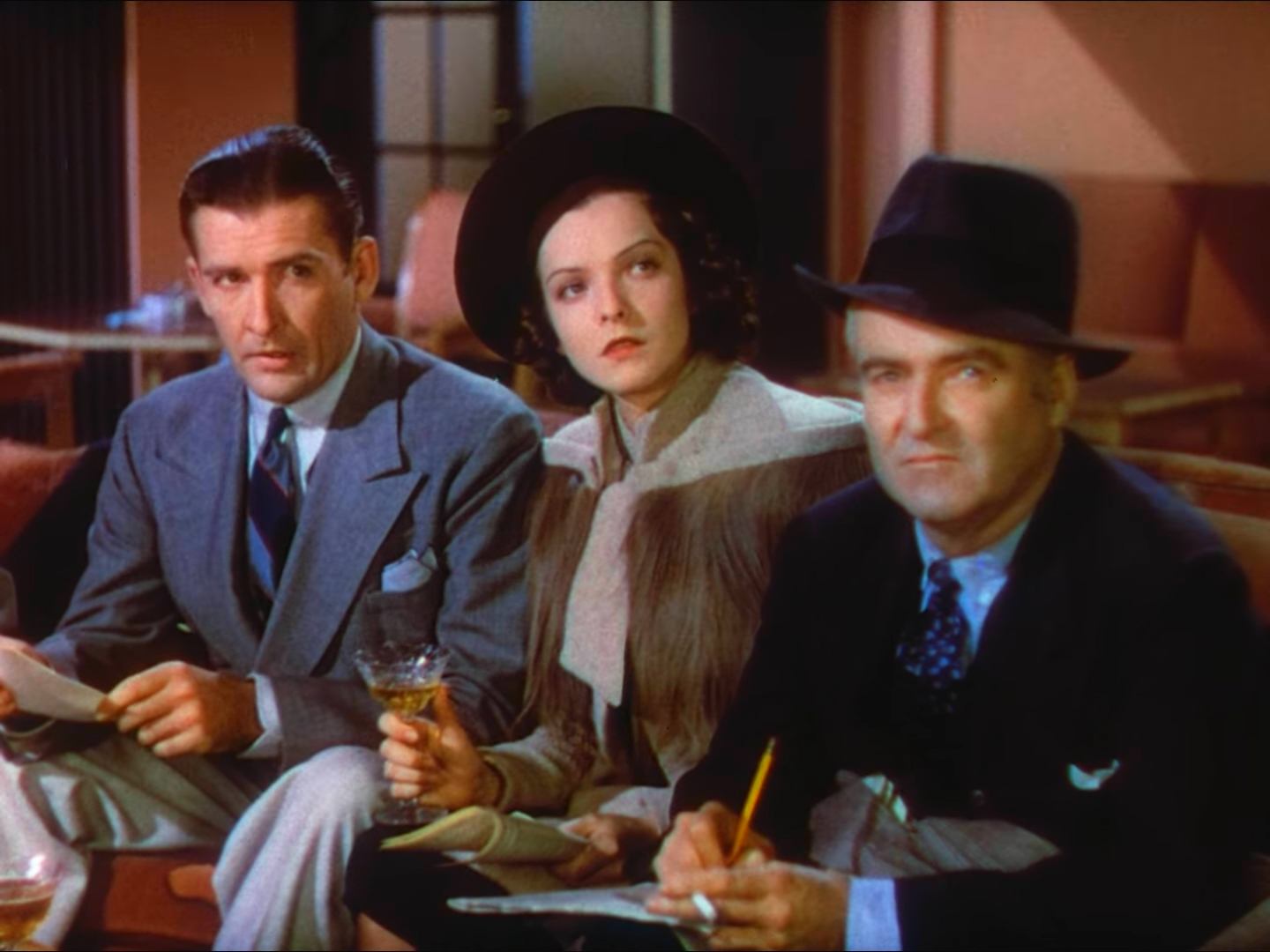
Tallichet (center) in A Star Is Born (1937)

Tallichet came to California from her native Texas in 1936 seeking a career in the movie business. According to her obituary in the Los Angeles Times, she was working in the publicity department at Paramount Pictures when she was befriended by actress Carole Lombard. She was introduced to producer David O. Selznick, who gave her a screen test for the role of Scarlett O'Hara in Gone with the Wind. She initially was cast for the role of Scarlett's sister Careen O'Hara, but the role was given to Ann Rutherford. Selznick also cast her in a minor uncredited role in A Star is Born (1937).

At the outset of her acting career, she also appeared in A Desperate Adventure (1938) and Girls' School (1938).

== Marriage and family ==
In 1938, an agent introduced her to Goldwyn Pictures director William Wyler, who had been divorced from his first wife Margaret Sullavan, since 1936. Three weeks later, on October 23, 1938, they were married, at the lakeside home of Walter Huston.

Tallichet, c. 1940

Before the United States entered World War II, both Tallichet and Wyler continued to work. She appeared in Stand Up and Fight (uncredited, 1939), Stranger on the Third Floor (1940), It Started with Eve (1941), and The Devil Pays Off (1941).

Also before the U.S. entered the war, her husband was an outspoken advocate for the defense of Great Britain. Mrs. Miniver (1942), his first Oscar-winning film, was a sympathetic portrayal of an English family enduring the Battle of Britain. After completing this film, he enlisted in the United States Army Air Corps and flew in missions over Europe in order to make documentaries about those adventures. At the 1943 Academy Awards program, Margaret accepted, in her husband's absence, his Academy Award for Best Director in Mrs. Miniver.

She and Wyler were parents of five children: Catherine Wyler (born July 25, 1939), Judy Wyler (born May 21, 1942), William Wyler Jr. (born April 4, 1946; died November 27, 1949), Melanie Ann Wyler (born November 25, 1950), and David Wyler (born September 1952). They remained married for 42 years until her husband's death. She was also the sister of aviator and restaurateur David Tallichet Jr.

== Death ==
She died on May 3, 1991, at age 77. According to her obituary in the New York Times, the cause of her death was cancer.

== Filmography ==
| Year | Title | Role | Notes |
|---|---|---|---|
| 1937 | A Star Is Born | Marion | uncredited |
| 1937 | The Prisoner of Zenda | | scenes deleted |
| 1938 | A Desperate Adventure | Betty Carrington | |
| 1938 | Girls' School | Gwennie | |
| 1939 | Stand Up and Fight | Fox Hunt Guest | uncredited |
| 1940 | Stranger on the Third Floor | Jane | |
| 1941 | It Started with Eve | Gloria Pennington | |
| 1941 | The Devil Pays Off | Joan Millard | |
