= Andrew Tombes =

American actor (1885–1976)

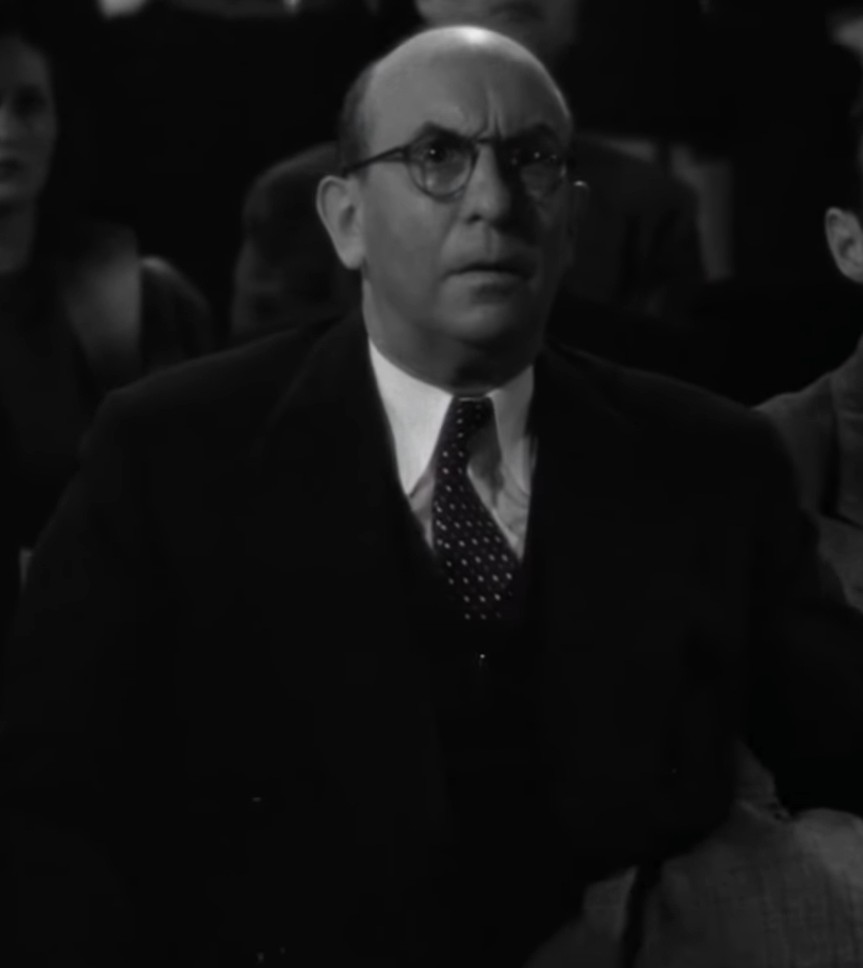
- Tombes in Meet John Doe (1941)
- Born: June 29, 1885; Ashtabula, Ohio, U.S.
- Died: March 17, 1976 (aged 90); New York City, U.S.
- Education: Phillips Exeter Academy
- Occupations: Character actor; comedian
- Years active: 1917–1956

Andrew Tombes (29 June 1885 – 17 March 1976) was an American comedian and character actor.

== Biography ==
The son of a grocer, originally from Ashtabula, Ohio, Tombes was educated at Phillips Exeter Academy.

Early in his career, he worked as a vaudeville comic. By December 1914 he had appeared in the headlining act for the opening of the Kansas City Orpheum Theatre.

He successfully ascended to Broadway comedies beginning in 1917, in the revue Miss 1917, and appeared there consistently through the 1920s, for instance in Poor Little Ritz Girl in 1920, Tip-Toes in 1925, and the Ziegfeld Follies of 1922 and 1927.

Tombes' first film appearances were in 1933, as he was already approaching 50 years old.

He made a total of about 150 films for various studios.

== Selected filmography ==
- The Bowery (1933) - Shill (uncredited)
- Broadway Through a Keyhole (1933) - Sidney - Columnist (uncredited)
- Moulin Rouge (1934) - McBride
- Doubting Thomas (1935) - Huxley Hossefrosse
- Here Comes Cookie (1935) - Botts
- Music Is Magic (1935) - Ben Pomeroy
- Thanks a Million (1935) - Mr. Grass
- King of Burlesque (1936) - Slattery
- It Had to Happen (1936) - Dooley
- Here Comes Trouble (1936) - Adams
- The Country Beyond (1936) - Sen. Rawlings
- Half Angel (1936) - Jury Foreman (uncredited)
- Ticket to Paradise (1936) - Nirney
- Hot Money (1936) - Willie
- Stage Struck (1936) - Burns Heywood
- The Devil Is a Sissy (1936) - Muldoon - a Policeman (uncredited)
- The Holy Terror (1937) - Commander J.J. Otis
- Time Out for Romance (1937) - James Blanchard
- Fair Warning (1937) - J.C. Farnham
- Turn Off the Moon (1937) - Dr. Wakefield
- Charlie Chan at the Olympics (1937) - Police Chief Scott
- Sing and Be Happy (1937) - Thomas Lane
- Riding on Air (1937) - Eddie Byrd
- Easy Living (1937) - E.J. Hulgar
- Meet the Boyfriend (1937) - J. Ardmore Potts
- Big City (1937) - Inspector Matthews
- 45 Fathers (1937) - Judge
- Checkers (1937) - Tobias Somers
- Borrowing Trouble (1937) - Uncle George
- Everybody Sing (1938) - Smith - The Gary Society Man (uncredited)
- Sally, Irene and Mary (1938) - Judge Wyler
- Battle of Broadway (1938) - Judge Hutchins
- Romance on the Run (1938) - J.W. Ridgeway
- One Wild Night (1938) - Police Chief William Nolan
- A Desperate Adventure (1938) - Cosmo Carrington
- Vacation from Love (1938) - Judge Brandon
- Five of a Kind (1938) - Dr. Bruno
- Always in Trouble (1938) - J. C. Darlington
- Thanks for Everything (1938) - Mayor
- Boy Trouble (1939) - Mr. Svively
- What a Life (1939) - Professor Abernathy
- Too Busy to Work (1939) - Wilbur Wentworth
- Nick Carter, Master Detective (1939) - Robinson (uncredited)
- Balalaika (1939) - Wilbur Allison (uncredited)
- Money to Burn (1939) - Brown
- Wolf of New York (1940) - Sylvester Duncan
- Village Barn Dance (1940) - James Rutherford Sr.
- In Old Missouri (1940) - Attorney
- Captain Caution (1940) - Sad Eyes
- Third Finger, Left Hand (1940) - Mr. Kelland (uncredited)
- Melody and Moonlight (1940) - Promoter (uncredited)
- Charter Pilot (1940) - Brady
- The Wild Man of Borneo (1941) - 'Doc' Dunbar
- Meet the Chump (1941) - Revello
- A Girl, a Guy and a Gob (1941) - Bus Conductor (uncredited)
- Meet John Doe (1941) - Spencer
- Double Date (1941) - Judge Perkins
- Melody for Three (1941) - Mickey Delany
- Sis Hopkins (1941) - Mayor
- Caught in the Draft (1941) - Justice of the Peace (uncredited)
- Mountain Moonlight (1941) - Sen. Marvin
- Lady Scarface (1941) - Art Seidel - hotel detective
- World Premiere (1941) - Nixon
- A Dangerous Game (1941) - Silas Biggsby
- Last of the Duanes (1941) - Sheriff Frank Taylor
- Texas (1941) - Tennessee
- Down Mexico Way (1941) - Mayor Tubbs
- Louisiana Purchase (1941) - Dean Albert Manning
- Bedtime Story (1941) - Pierce
- Hellzapoppin' (1941) - Max Kane (uncredited)
- Don't Get Personal (1942) - James M. Snow
- Blondie Goes to College (1942) - J.J 'Snookie' Wadsworth
- Call Out the Marines (1942) - Mr. Woods (uncredited)
- A Close Call for Ellery Queen (1942) - Bates
- Obliging Young Lady (1942) - First Train Conductor
- Larceny, Inc. (1942) - Oscar Engelhart
- My Gal Sal (1942) - Corbin
- They All Kissed the Bride (1942) - Crane
- Between Us Girls (1942) - Doctor
- Road to Morocco (1942) - Oso Bucco (uncredited)
- Reveille with Beverly (1943) - Mr. Smith
- The Meanest Man in the World (1943) - Judge (uncredited)
- Hi'ya, Chum (1943) - Jerry MackIntosh, Cook
- It Ain't Hay (1943) - Big-Hearted Charlie
- A Stranger in Town (1943) - Roscoe Swade
- It's a Great Life (1943) - Insurance Agent (uncredited)
- Du Barry Was a Lady (1943) - Mr. McGowan (uncredited)
- Coney Island (1943) - Horace Carter (uncredited)
- Honeymoon Lodge (1943) - Judge Wilkins
- Hi Diddle Diddle (1943) - Mike
- Let's Face It (1943) - Judge Henry Clay Pigeon
- I Dood It (1943) - Mr. Spelvin
- Crazy House (1943) - Horace L. Gregory
- My Kingdom for a Cook (1943) - Abe Mason (uncredited)
- Swing Fever (1943) - Dr. Clyde L. Star
- Riding High (1943) - P.D. Smith (uncredited)
- The Mad Ghoul (1943) - Eagan
- His Butler's Sister (1943) - Brophy
- Phantom Lady (1944) - Bartender
- Week-End Pass (1944) - Constable
- Show Business (1944) - Judge (uncredited)
- Bathing Beauty (1944) - Justice of the Peace (uncredited)
- Kansas City Kitty (1944) - Judge (uncredited)
- Reckless Age (1944) - Mr. Cook
- The Merry Monahans (1944) - Osborne (uncredited)
- San Fernando Valley (1944) - Cyclone Kenyon
- The Singing Sheriff (1944) - Jonas
- Goin' to Town (1944) - Parker
- Murder in the Blue Room (1944) - Dr. Carroll
- Something for the Boys (1944) - Southern Colonel (uncredited)
- Lake Placid Serenade (1944) - Skating Club Head
- Can't Help Singing (1944) - Sad Sam
- Night Club Girl (1945) - Simmons
- Bring On the Girls (1945) - Dr. Spender
- G.I. Honeymoon (1945) - Reverend Horace
- Patrick the Great (1945) - Sam Bassett
- Rhapsody in Blue (1945) - Mr. Million
- You Came Along (1945) - Drunk
- Incendiary Blonde (1945) - Hadley (uncredited)
- Don't Fence Me In (1945) - Cartwright
- Frontier Gal (1945) - Judge Prescott
- Two Sisters from Boston (1946) - Recording Session Director (uncredited)
- Badman's Territory (1946) - Doc Grant
- Sing While You Dance (1946) - Gorman
- Beat the Band (1947) - 'Professor' Enrico Blanchetti / Mr. Dillingham
- The Devil Thumbs a Ride (1947) - Joe Brayden, Night Watchman
- The Fabulous Dorseys (1947) - De Witt (uncredited)
- Copacabana (1947) - Anatole Murphy (uncredited)
- Hoppy's Holiday (1947) - Mayor Patton
- Christmas Eve (1947) - Auctioneer
- Louisiana (1947)
- My Wild Irish Rose (1947) - Herman Baxter - Bartender (uncredited)
- Two Guys from Texas (1948) - The Texan
- Oh, You Beautiful Doll (1949) - Ted Held
- Joe Palooka in Humphrey Takes a Chance (1950) - Sheriff Grogan
- The Jackpot (1950) - Attorney Pritchett (uncredited)
- Watch the Birdie (1950) - Doctor (uncredited)
- A Wonderful Life (1951) – Harry Jenkins
- Belle Le Grand (1951) - Cartwright (uncredited)
- Oklahoma Annie (1952) - Mayor of Eureka
- I Dream of Jeanie (1952) - R.E. Howard
- How to Be Very, Very Popular (1955) - Police Sgt. Moon
- The Go-Getter (1956) - Mr. Symington (final film role)
