= The Man from Guntown =

1935 film

- Directed by: Ford Beebe
- Written by: Ford Beebe; Thomas H. Ince Jr.
- Produced by: William McCabe; Nat Ross
- Starring: Tim McCoy; Billie Seward; Wheeler Oakman
- Cinematography: James Diamond
- Edited by: Robert Jahns
- Music by: Lee Zahler
- Production company: Nat Ross Productions
- Distributed by: Puritan Pictures
- Release date: August 15, 1935
- Running time: 61 minutes
- Country: United States
- Language: English

The Man from Guntown is a 1935 American western film directed by Ford Beebe and starring Tim McCoy, Billie Seward and Wheeler Oakman. It was a second feature, distributed by the independent Puritan Pictures

== Plot ==
Tim Hanlon goes to inform Ruth McArthur that her brother, who she hasn't seen for many years, has been killed. He helps her retain control of a dam that the ruthless Henry DeLong wants to get his hands on, having killed her brother in the process.

== Cast ==
- Tim McCoy as Tim Hanlon
- Billie Seward as Ruth McArthur
- Wheeler Oakman as Henry DeLong
- Robert McKenzie as Eric W. Gillis
- Rex Lease as Alan McArthur
- Eva McKenzie as Aunt Sarah
- Jack Rube Clifford as Sheriff Nolan
- Jack Rockwell as Henchman Bill Slater
- George Chesebro as Henchman Carnes
- Horace B. Carpenter as Gillespie

== Bibliography ==
- Fetrow, Alan G. . Sound films, 1927-1939: a United States Filmography. McFarland, 1992.
- Pitts, Michael R. Western Movies: A Guide to 5,105 Feature Films. McFarland, 2012.
