= Down Mexico Way =

1941 film

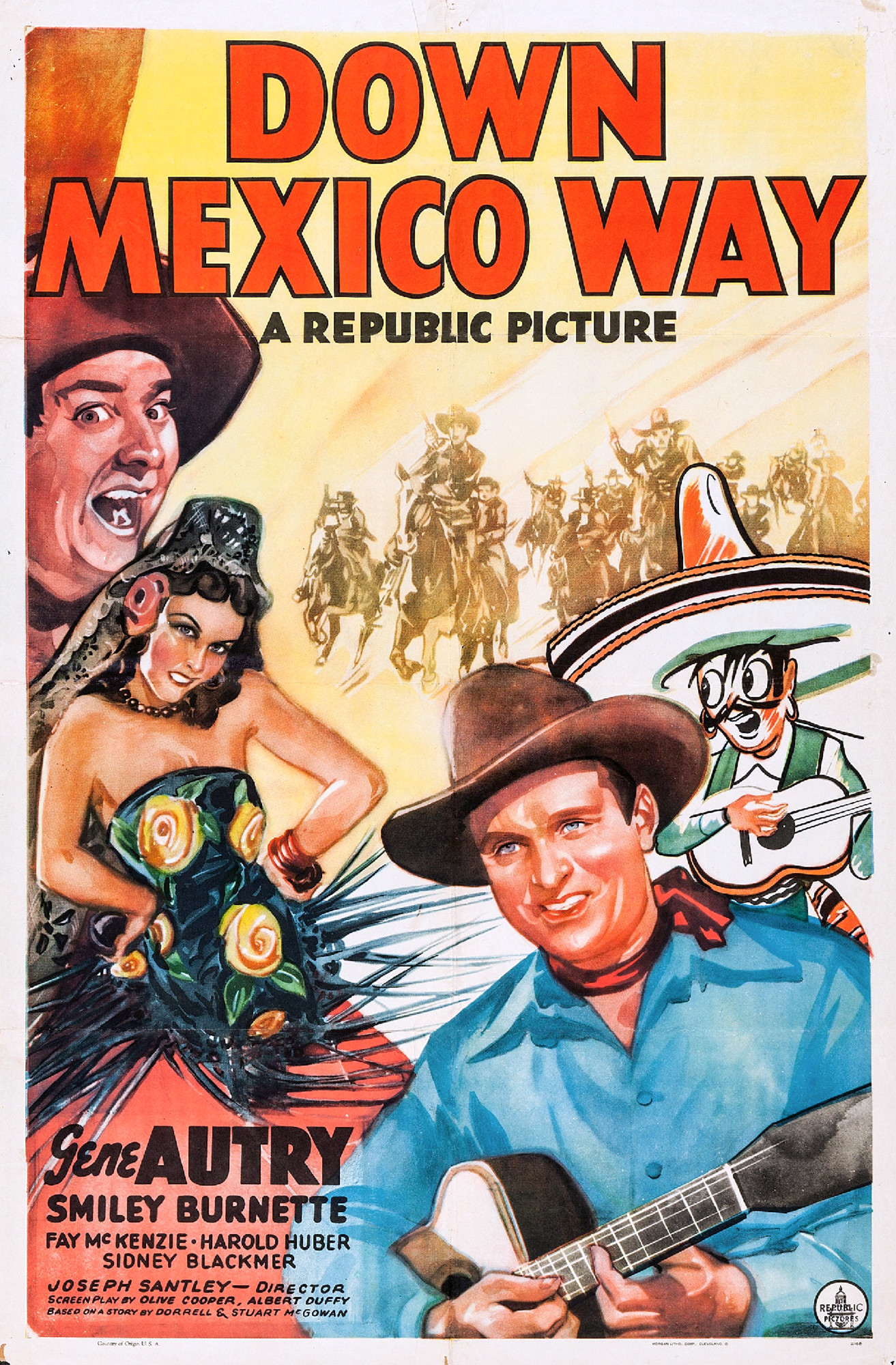
- Theatrical release poster
- Directed by: Joseph Santley
- Screenplay by: Olive Cooper; Albert Duffy
- Story by: Dorrell McGowan; Stuart E. McGowan
- Produced by: Harry Grey
- Starring: Gene Autry; Smiley Burnette; Fay McKenzie
- Cinematography: Jack A. Marta
- Edited by: Howard O'Neill
- Music by: Raoul Kraushaar (supervisor)
- Production company: Republic Pictures
- Distributed by: Republic Pictures
- Release date: October 15, 1941 (U.S.)
- Running time: 78 minutes
- Country: United States
- Language: English
- Budget: $124,947

Down Mexico Way is a 1941 American Western film directed by Joseph Santley and starring Gene Autry, Smiley Burnette, and Fay McKenzie. Based on a story by Dorrell and Stuart E. McGowan, the film is about a singing cowboy who comes to the aid of the townspeople of Sage City who are victims of a nefarious scam.

== Plot ==
The townspeople of Sage City are celebrating the upcoming production of a motion picture in their community. The film's producers, Homer Gerard (Arthur Loft) and Ellery Gibson (Sidney Blackmer), assure the townspeople that if they invest financially in the production, that John Wayne himself will star in the movie, and the world premier will be held in Sage City, putting their community on the map. Singing cowboy Gene Autry (Gene Autry) and his sidekick Frog Millhouse (Smiley Burnette) are caught up in the excitement and host a barbecue for the town and its good fortune.

Soon after, Gene discovers that the producers are in fact con artists who have swindled Sage City citizens out of $35,000. Gerard and Gibson, whose real names are Flood and Allen, travel to San Ramon, Mexico, where their bosses, the real Gerard and Gibson, are preparing to pull a similar swindle on the townspeople of San Ramon. Their primary target is the wealthy Don Carlos Alvarado (Julian Rivero), whose daughter Maria Elena (Fay McKenzie) has been promised a starring role in the film in return for his financial support.

Following the con artists' trail, Gene and Frog travel to San Ramon and meet beautiful Maria Elena on the way. They tell her about how the citizens of Sage City were swindled. Gene and Frog meet the real Gibson and Gerard, but do not recognize them, but Frog does recognize their car—the same one Flood and Allen drove in Sage City. Gene realizes that these men must be involved in some way. The following night, Gene accompanies Maria Elena to a fiesta. Afterwards, some of Gerard and Gibson's henchmen take shots at Gene, Frog, and their friend, reformed bandit Pancho Grande (Harold Huber), looking to put an end to Gene's investigation.

Determined to expose the con artists' latest scheme, Gene abducts Maria Elena during the first day of filming and convinces her that something is not right. At Gene's suggestion, Maria Elena persuades her father to request that Gerard and Gibson, as a sign of good faith, invest some of their own money in the production. The swindlers agree to the request, even though they have no money in the bank. They devise a plan to hold up the bank car bringing Don Carlos' share of the investment the following day and frame Gene for the crime.

When they learn about the plot, Gene and Frog go after Gerard and Gibson's henchmen while Pancho Grande reunites with his old gang who agreed to help. Following a dramatic chase, Gene captures the ringleaders and their henchmen. Afterwards, Rurale Captain Rodriguez (Thornton Edwards) gives Gene the money swindled from the citizens of Sage City, and to everyone's surprise, the former bandit Pancho Grande announces that he has become a policeman. Gene assures Maria Elena that he will return in a month to accompany her to another fiesta.

== Cast ==
- Gene Autry as Gene Autry
- Smiley Burnette as Frog
- Fay McKenzie as Maria Elena Alvarado
- Harold Huber as Pancho Grande
- Sidney Blackmer as Ellery Gibson
- Joe Sawyer as Allen
- Andrew Tombes as Mayor Tubbs
- Murray Alper as Flood
- Arthur Loft as Homer Gerard
- Duncan Renaldo as Juan
- Paul Fix as Henchman Davis
- Julian Rivero as Don Carlos Alvarado
- Ruth Robinson as Mercedes
- Thornton Edwards as Rurale Captain Rodriguez
- The Herrera Sisters as Singers
- The Lone Star Cowboys as Singers at Barbeque (uncredited)
- Champion as Champion, Gene's Horse

== Production ==
=== Casting ===
Between 1941 and 1942, Fay McKenzie appeared as the leading lady in five Gene Autry films: Down Mexico Way (1941), Sierra Sue (1941), Cowboy Serenade (1942), Heart of the Rio Grande (1942), and Home in Wyomin' (1942). Born in Hollywood, California in 1918 into a show business family, McKenzie made her screen debut at the age of 10 weeks old as Gloria Swanson's baby in Station Content (1918). After several other child roles, she completed her education. She returned to the screen in 1934, appearing in mostly uncredited roles for the next few years. In 1940, she received her first major recognition in the stage production of Meet the People. She came to Republic Pictures through her sister who introduced her to family friend Herbert J. Yates, the head of Republic. After a quick screen test, she was cast in Autry's next film, Down Mexico Way. In 1946 she left movies to raise a family with her husband Tom Waldman. In 1959 she returned to films and television for occasional roles. In 2003, McKenzie would recall her days working with Gene Autry:

I loved working with Gene, he was terrific! I could sing and that was something the earlier girls couldn't do. Yates knew I had done Broadway; that helped! I could do more than smile and wave at the cowboy! ... He was also a brilliant businessman! Not a fly-by-night. It was a wonderful, rich experience. I would get to the studio early, about 5, go past the publicity department, and often someone would come out and get me to sign some piece of paper. ... I never read the papers, as I was so protected by my family and never suspected anything could be wrong. One day Gene arrived at the same time I did, and saw what was happening. He ragged me all day long! 'You could have signed away your salary! That is the dumbest thing I've ever seen!' And he was right!

=== Filming and budget ===
Down Mexico Way was filmed August 18 to September 6, 1941. The film had an operating budget of $124,947 (equal to $2,734,982 today), and a negative cost of $133,520.

=== Filming locations ===
- Santa Clarita, California, USA
- Alabama Hills, Lone Pine, California, USA
- Corriganville Movie Ranch, Simi Valley, California, USA
- Melody Ranch, 24715 Oak Creek Avenue, Newhall, California, USA
- Whitney Portal Road, Lone Pine Creek Canyon, Lone Pine, California, USA

=== Soundtrack ===
- "South of the Border" (Jimmy Kennedy, Michael Carr)
- "The Cowboy and the Lady" (Arthur Quenzer, Lionel Newman)
- "Down Mexico Way" (Jule Styne, Sol Meyer, Eddie Cherkose)
- "A Gay Ranchero (Las Altenitas)" (Juan José Espinosa, Abe Tuvim, Francia Luban)
- "Maria Elena" (Lorenzo Barcelata, Bob Russell) by Gene Autry
- "Beer Barrel Polka" (Lew Brown, Wladimir A. Timm, Jaromir Vejvoda) by Gene Autry and Smiley Burnette
- "La Rumba Caliente"
- "Guadalajara" (Pepe Guízar) by the Herrera Sisters
- "Aquellos ojos verdes" (Nilo Menendez)
- "La cachita" (Rafael Hernández)
