= The Yoke's on Me =

1944 American short film by Jules White

- Directed by: Jules White
- Written by: Clyde Bruckman
- Produced by: Jules White
- Starring: Moe Howard; Larry Fine; Curly Howard; Robert McKenzie; Eva McKenzie; Emmett Lynn; Al Thompson; Victor Travers
- Cinematography: Glen Gano
- Edited by: Charles Hochberg
- Distributed by: Columbia Pictures
- Release date: May 26, 1944 (U.S.)
- Running time: 16:08
- Country: United States
- Language: English

The Yoke's on Me is a 1944 short subject directed by Jules White starring American slapstick comedy team The Three Stooges (Moe Howard, Larry Fine and Curly Howard). It is the 79th entry in the series released by Columbia Pictures starring the comedians, who appeared in 190 shorts at the studio between 1934 and 1959.

== Plot ==
The Stooges try to join the army but are labeled 4-F by the draft board due to Curly having water on the knee. After they decide to go on vacation until a job comes along, their father (Robert McKenzie) insists they aid the war effort instead by becoming farmers. Inspired, the trio sell their dilapidated car and buy an equally dilapidated farm. The farm contains no livestock except for one chicken and two geese, one adult male, and a baby goose that Curly helps out of a hole by filling it with water from a hose. The boys then spot some pumpkins and decide to carve and sell them. Meanwhile a police officer tells the farmer that sold the Stooges the farm some Japanese Americans escaped from a prison camp, and that an ostrich escapes from a circus.

In the interim, the escaped Japanese-Americans from the prison camp (known during World War II as relocation centers), and work their way onto the Stooges' farm. Curly is the first to notice some suspicious activity (one of the escapees places a carved pumpkin on his head, spooking Curly). Eventually, Moe and Larry believe him, and realize that the farm is surrounded by the Japanese-Americans (whom they mistake for Japanese invaders). Moe then throws an ostrich egg (laden with digested gunpowder) at the escapees, killing them.

== Cast ==
=== Credited ===
- Moe Howard as Moe
- Larry Fine as Larry
- Curly Howard as Curly

=== Uncredited ===
- Eva McKenzie as Ma
- Robert McKenzie as Pa
- Emmett Lynn as Smithers
- Al Thompson as Sheriff
- Victor Travers as Deputy Sheriff

== Production notes ==
The Yoke's on Me was filmed on November 8–12, 1943.

== Historical perspective ==
The World War II era witnessed the production of a series of comedies that engaged in propagandistic themes against the Japanese, emblematic of the prevailing sentiments of the time. Notable among these productions are Spook Louder (1943), No Dough Boys (1944), Booby Dupes (1945), and The Yoke's on Me, each contributing to the wartime discourse through humor-laden narratives.

Among these films, The Yoke's on Me stands out as a particularly contentious piece, drawing scrutiny from contemporary critics and enduring a period of blacklisting on certain television stations. Its treatment of Japanese American escapees from a relocation center, while intended for comedic effect, has sparked debate and controversy over the years. Notably, the Japanese characters depicted in the film are not portrayed as prisoners of war but rather as escapees from a relocation center, a distinction that adds layers of complexity to the ethical interpretation of the narrative.

Jon Solomon, author of The Complete Three Stooges: The Official Filmography and Three Stooges Companion, reflects on the enduring impact of The Yoke's on Me, suggesting that no other Stooge film resonates as profoundly with modern viewers due to its handling of sensitive subject matter. This sentiment is echoed by Michael Fleming, author of The Three Stooges: An Illustrated History, From Amalgamated Morons to American Heroes, who offers a more pointed critique, emphasizing the disconnect between the film's comedic treatment and the historical context of mistreatment and dispossession experienced by Japanese-born American citizens during the wartime relocation efforts.

== Quotes ==
- Curly: "Look, look! A pelican!"
- Moe: "That's no pelican, it's a gander."
- Curly: "Mahatma gander?"
- Moe: "No, a gander, a gander! A goose's husband."
- Larry: "Yeah, a papa goose."
- Curly: "Do they have papa and mama gooseses?"
- Larry: "Oh sure. And little baby gooseses, too."
- Curly: "Oh, I read about them. They come from Germany...the goosetapo!"
