= 94th Aero Squadron (restaurant) =

Restaurant in Los Angeles, California (1973–2022)

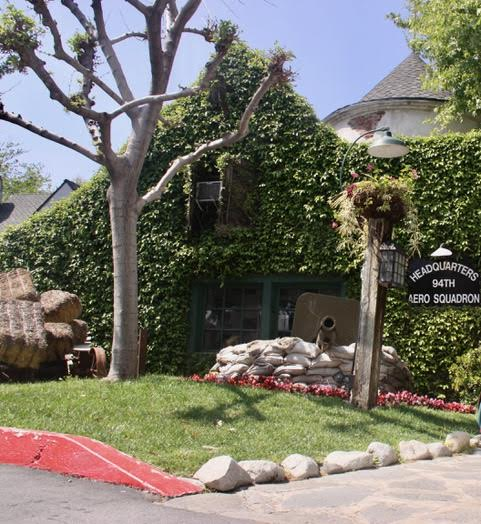
- Front of the restaurant
- Interactive map of 94th Aero Squadron

Restaurant information
- Established: 1973
- Closed: 2022
- Food type: American traditional
- Location: 16320 Raymer Street, Los Angeles, California
- Coordinates: 34.2177°N 118.4887°W
- Other locations: Chicago, Columbus, Costa Mesa, Denver, Miami, San Diego, San Jose, St. Louis

94th Aero Squadron was a historic restaurant in Los Angeles, California that opened next to Van Nuys Airport in 1973 and closed in 2022. Additional California locations opened in Costa Mesa, San Diego, and San Jose, and even more locations opened Chicago, Denver, Miami, St. Louis, and Columbus, Ohio.

== History ==
David Tallichet, a World War II pilot who flew 20 combat missions in a B-17 bomber, founded 94th Aero Squadron under his Specialty Restaurants Corporation, which opened more than 100 restaurants nationwide. This restaurant, the first of several under the 94th Aero Squadron banner, was built adjacent to and featured a view of Van Nuys Airport's runway, allowing patrons to watch airplanes take off and land while dining. It was named after the 94th Aero Squadron and opened in 1973.

The restaurant closed in 2022. It was demolished the following year, with plans for an industrial building to rise in its place.

== Design and decor ==
94th Aero Squadron's design was said to resemble a French chateau and a rustic Normandy farmhouse. A portion of the restaurant was meant to resemble a bombed-out Normandy bunker and one of the restaurant's tables, hand-carved by pilots just after World War II ended, was made of wood from a World War II airplane; in the restaurant, that table was reserved for pilots.

The restaurant featured numerous military and aviation relics, including a World War I propeller plane, a World War II ambulance, and vintage war Jeeps outside the entrance. Inside, memorabilia donated by veterans, including uniforms, gas masks, propellers, torpedoes, and framed photographs, covered the walls and hung from the ceiling. Model planes hung from the ceiling as well.

== Other locations ==
Interior of the Columbus, Ohio, location c. 1980

Additional 94th Aero Squadron restaurants were opened in Chicago, Costa Mesa, Denver, Miami, San Diego, San Jose, St. Louis, and Columbus, Ohio. The San Diego chapter of the California Restaurant Association has repeatedly nominated the San Diego location for best American traditional restaurant in the city, and Bill Clinton hosted a meet-and-greet at the St. Louis location during his 1992 presidential campaign.
