= Station Content =

1918 film

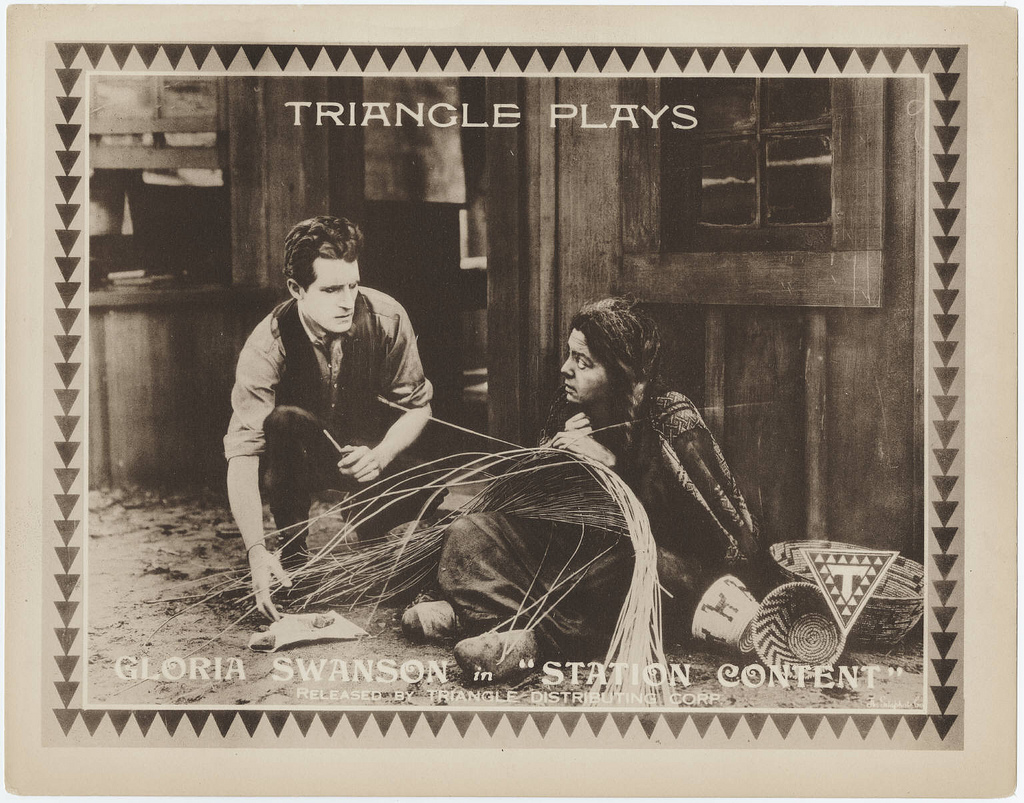
- Lobby card with film scene
- Directed by: Arthur Hoyt
- Written by: Catherine Carr
- Starring: Gloria Swanson
- Cinematography: Elgin Leslie
- Distributed by: Triangle Film Corporation
- Release date: June 16, 1918
- Running time: 5 reels
- Country: United States
- Language: Silent (English intertitles)

Station Content is a 1918 American silent drama film directed by Arthur Hoyt and starring Gloria Swanson. The original, five reel feature is presumed to be lost, but a one reel abridgment created in 1926 does survive and has been released on video.

== Plot ==
As described in a film magazine, when Jim Manning is rebuked by his wife Kitty for failure to secure a promotion that will take them away from Cybar, an isolated spot, he replies in kind, and the strained relations lead to Kitty running away with a musical comedy company. She meets Stephen Morton, president of the railroad, who becomes fascinated with her. He wishes to free himself from his wife and marry her, and Kitty promises an answer within a month. While returning to the city, she is held overnight at a small railroad station and memories fill her with remorse. She learns that lightning has destroyed a bridge on the train line, and after a wild ride on a gasoline handcar is able to save the limited. Morton and her husband Jim are both on the train, and a reconciliation between the couple is effected.

== Cast ==
- Gloria Swanson as Kitty Manning
- Lee Hill as Jim Manning
- Arthur Millett as Stephen Morton
- Nellie Allen as Mrs. Morton
- Ward Caulfield as Theatrical manager
- May Walters as Mrs. Rothfield
- Fay McKenzie as Kitty's Baby (uncredited)

Fay McKenzie was the last surviving cast member at the time of her death.

== Reception ==
Like many American films of the time, Station Content was subject to cuts by city and state film censorship boards. For example, the Chicago Board of Censors required a cut, in Reel 4, of the intertitle "My proposition is square. I want real companionship."

The film was released in New Zealand beginning in October 1918, using both its original title and the alternative title The Runaway Wife.
