= William Morgan (director) =

London-born film editor and director

- Born: 1899; London, United Kingdom
- Died: 1964
- Occupation: Film editor

William Morgan (1899–1964) was a London-born film editor and director.

== Selected filmography ==
- Storm Over Bengal (1938) (editor)
- Bowery Boy (1940)
- Mr. District Attorney (1941)
- Secrets of the Underground (1942)
- Guest Wife (1945) (editor)
- Tarantula! (1955) (editor)
- The Violent Years (1956) (director)
