= Out of the West =

1926 film

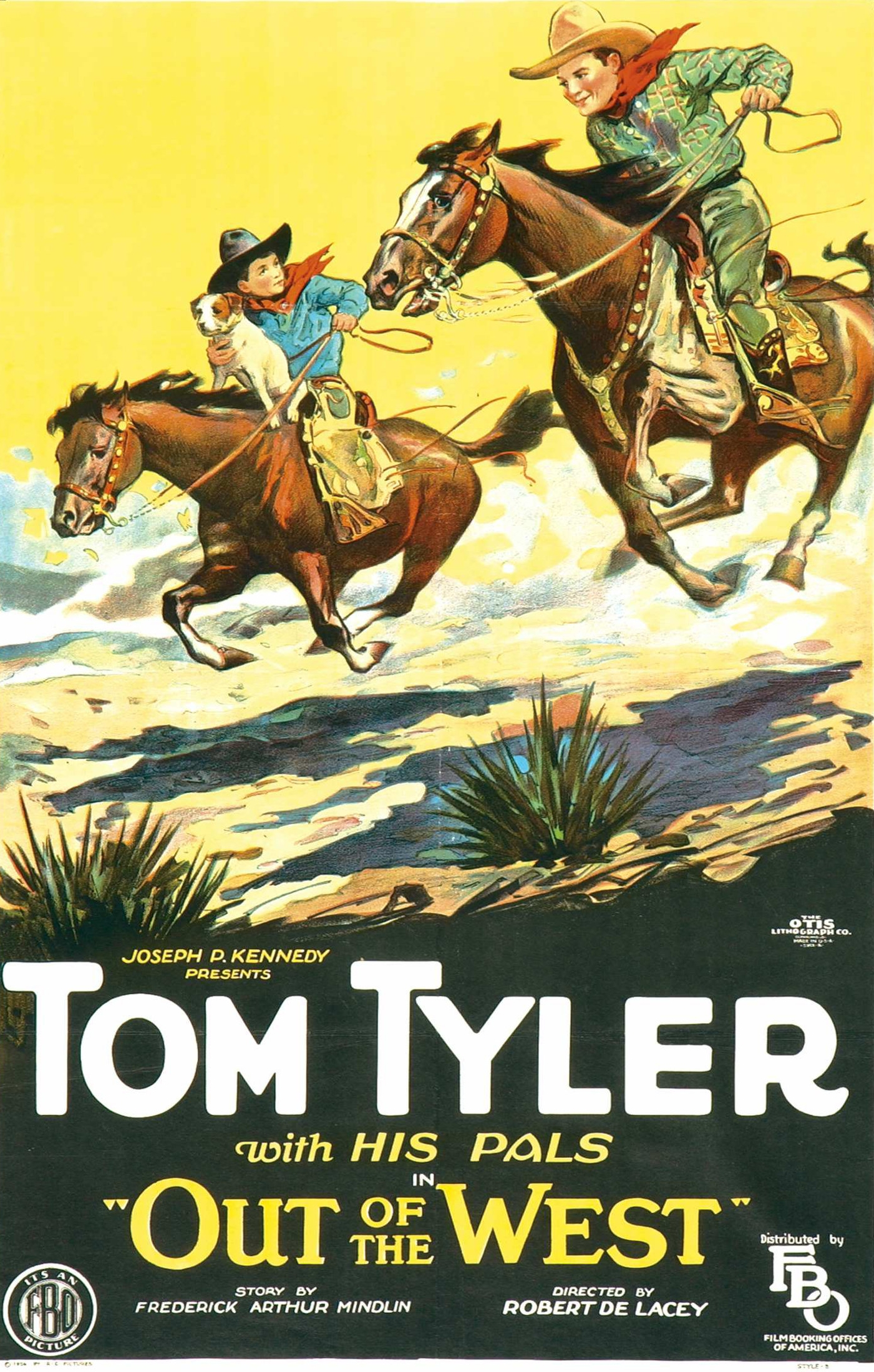
- Theatrical release poster
- Directed by: Robert De Lacey
- Screenplay by: Wyndham Gittens
- Story by: Frederick Arthur Mindlin
- Starring: Tom Tyler; Bernice Welch; L.J. O'Connor; Ethan Laidlaw; Alfred Hewston; Frankie Darro
- Cinematography: John Leezer
- Production company: Robertson-Cole Pictures Corporation
- Distributed by: Film Booking Offices of America
- Release date: September 26, 1926
- Running time: 50 minutes
- Country: United States
- Languages: Silent; English intertitles

Out of the West is a 1926 American silent Western film directed by Robert De Lacey and written by Wyndham Gittens. The film stars Tom Tyler, Bernice Welch, L.J. O'Connor, Ethan Laidlaw, Alfred Hewston and Frankie Darro. The film was released on September 26, 1926, by Film Booking Offices of America.

== Cast ==
- Tom Tyler as Tom Hanley
- Bernice Welch as Bernice O'Connor
- L.J. O'Connor as Jim Rollins
- Ethan Laidlaw as Bide Goodrich
- Alfred Hewston as John O'Connor
- Frankie Darro as Frankie O'Connor
- Gertrude Claire as 'Grannie' Hanley
- Barney Furey as Trail Scout
