= Harry Woods (actor) =

American actor (1889–1968)

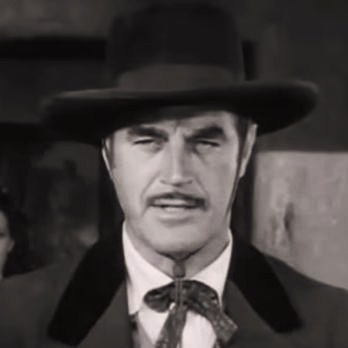
- Woods in The Ranger and the Lady (1940)
- Born: Harry Lewis Woods; May 5, 1889; Cleveland, Ohio, U.S.
- Died: December 28, 1968 (aged 79); Westminster, California, U.S.
- Occupation: Actor
- Years active: 1923-1961
- Spouse: Helen Priscilla Hockenberry
- Children: 4, including Craig Woods

Harry Lewis Woods (May 5, 1889 – December 28, 1968) was an American film actor.

== Career ==
Woods was Born in Cleveland, Ohio and was a millinery salesman prior to becoming an actor. Appearing in nearly 250 films between 1923 and 1961, as well as on television, Woods is probably best-known today for his role as gangster Alky Briggs in the Marx Brothers film Monkey Business (1931). During his 35-year film career, he seldom played ordinary henchmen, usually cast as both the brains (the banker or saloon owner who secretly runs the gang terrorizing the area) and the brawn behind the local villainy. Woods was well respected by his peers. Another prime screen villain, Roy Barcroft, once said of him, "Everything I know about being a bad guy I learned from Harry Woods." He retired from acting in 1961.

== Personal life and death ==
In 1911, Woods married Helen Priscilla Hockenberry. They had four children: a daughter and three sons, the first of whom died at age 2. The other two, Richard Woods and Harry Lewis Woods Jr., went on to have modest careers as Hollywood bit players, the latter as Craig Woods, the former as Dick Durrell.

Woods died of uremia in Westminster, California, on December 28, 1968 at the age of 79. He was survived by his wife, daughter and two sons.

== Selected filmography ==
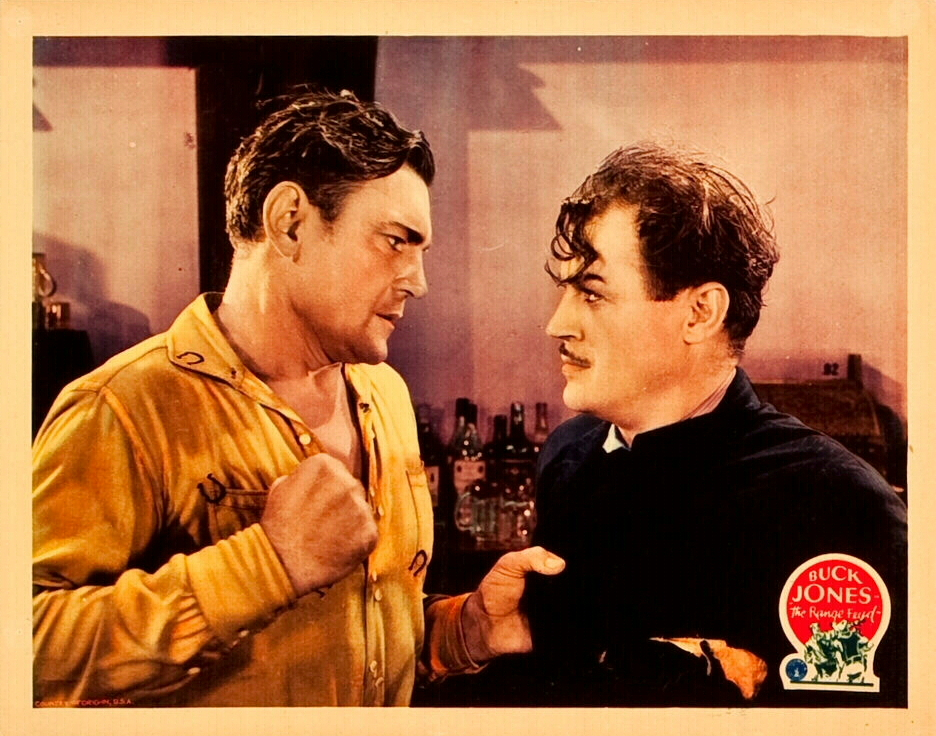
Lobby card with Buck Jones and Harry Woods in The Range Feud (1931)

- Don Quickshot of the Rio Grande (1923) - A Knight
- The Steel Trail (1923) - Morris Blake
- Battlin' Buckaroo (1924) - Buck Carson
- The Fast Express (1924) - Tom Boyd
- Wolves of the North (1924, Serial) - Bob Hunter
- Dynamite Dan (1924) - Brute Lacy
- Ten Scars Make a Man (1924) - Buck Simpson
- A Cafe in Cairo (1924) - Kali
- The Bandit's Baby (1925) - Matt Hartigan
- Fighting Courage (1925) - (uncredited)
- A Man Four-Square (1926) - Ben Taylor
- A Trip to Chinatown (1926) - Norman Blood
- 30 Below Zero (1926) - Cavender
- A Regular Scout (1926) - Scar Stevens
- Cyclone of the Range (1927) - The Black Rider / Don Alvarado
- Splitting the Breeze (1927) - Dave Matlock
- Silver Comes Through (1927) - Stanton
- Tom's Gang (1927) - Bart Haywood
- Jesse James (1927) - Bob Ford
- When the Law Rides (1928) - The Raven
- Red Riders of Canada (1928) - Monsieur Le Busard
- The Sunset Legion (1928) - Honest John
- The Viking (1928) - Egil
- Tyrant of Red Gulch (1928) - Ivan Petrovitch
- The Candy Kid (1928)
- Gun Law (1929) - Bull Driscoll
- The Desert Rider (1929) - Williams
- China Bound (1929) - Officer
- The Phantom Rider (1929) - Calhound Hardy
- Neath Western Skies (1929) - Jim Canfield
- The Lone Rider (1930) - Ed Farrell
- Pardon My Gun (1930) - Cooper
- Men Without Law (1930) - Murdock
- West of Cheyenne (1931) - Kurt Raymer, aka The Laramie Kid
- The Texas Ranger (1931) - Matt Taylor
- In Old Cheyenne (1931) - Winslow
- I Like Your Nerve (1931) - Cellano - Assassin (uncredited)
- Monkey Business (1931) - Alky Briggs
- Palmy Days (1931) - Yolando's Henchman
- The Range Feud (1931) - Vandall
- Law and Order (1932) - Walt Northrup
- Sky Devils (1932) - Military Policeman (uncredited)
- Night World (1932) - Gang Leader (uncredited)
- Two Seconds (1932) - Executioner (uncredited)
- Radio Patrol (1932) - Kloskey
- I Am a Fugitive from a Chain Gang (1932) - Prison Guard (uncredited)
- Haunted Gold (1932) - Joe Ryan
- My Weakness (1933) - Gordoni (uncredited)
- The Prizefighter and the Lady (1933) - George Lyons (uncredited)
- From Headquarters (1933) - Mullins - Police Guard (uncredited)
- The World Changes (1933) - Sam (uncredited)
- Hoop-La (1933) - Side Show Troublemaker (uncredited)
- Shadows of Sing Sing (1933) - Al Rossi
- Caravan (1934) - Romeo (uncredited)
- Devil Tiger (1934) - Ramseye Doyle
- Wonder Bar (1934) - First Detective (uncredited)
- The Crosby Case (1934) - Detective Logan (uncredited)
- Journal of a Crime (1934) - Detective with Inspector (uncredited)
- School for Girls (1934) - Detective
- I Believed in You (1934) - State Trooper (uncredited)
- The Scarlet Empress (1934) - Doctor #1 (uncredited)
- The Circus Clown (1934) - Ajax
- Belle of the Nineties (1934) - Slade
- The St. Louis Kid (1934) - Louie Munn
- The President Vanishes (1934) - James Kramer
- Rustlers of Red Dog (1935, Serial) - 'Rocky'
- When a Man's a Man (1935) - Nick Gambert
- The Call of the Savage (1935, Serial) - Borno
- Let 'Em Have It (1935) - Big Bill
- Silk Hat Kid (1935) - Salesman (uncredited)
- Dante's Inferno (1935) - Reynolds - Second Officer (uncredited)
- The Adventures of Rex and Rinty (1935, Serial) - Crawford
- Call of the Wild (1935) - Soapy Smith (uncredited)
- Heir to Trouble (1935) - Honest John Motley
- Stormy (1935) - Mack - Red Wing's Owner (uncredited)
- Remember Last Night? (1935) - Station Agent (uncredited)
- Ship Cafe (1935) - Donovan (uncredited)
- Gallant Defender (1935) - Barr Munro
- Lawless Riders (1935) - Bart
- Rose of the Rancho (1936) - Bull Bangle
- It Had to Happen (1936) - Workman (uncredited)
- The Lawless Nineties (1936) - Charles K. Plummer
- The Robin Hood of El Dorado (1936) - Pete
- Silly Billies (1936) - Hank Bewley
- Heroes of the Range (1936) - Bull Lamton
- Human Cargo (1936) - Ira Conklin
- The Last Outlaw (1936) - Traffic Policeman (uncredited)
- Ticket to Paradise (1936) - John Dawson
- The Phantom Rider (1936, Serial) - Harvey Delaney
- The Unknown Ranger (1936) - Vance Rand
- The Plainsman (1936) - Quartermaster Sergeant
- Conflict (1936) - 'Ruffhouse' Kelly
- Criminal Lawyer (1937) - Police Inspector Burke (uncredited)
- Outcast (1937) - Grant - Head Lyncher
- Land Beyond the Law (1937) - Tascosa
- I Promise to Pay (1937) - Henchman Fats
- Reckless Ranger (1937) - Barlowe
- Border Cafe (1937) - Ranger Bert (uncredited)
- The Last Train from Madrid (1937) - Government Man (uncredited)
- Range Defenders (1937) - John Harvey
- The Emperor's Candlesticks (1937) - Capt. Demisoff (uncredited)
- The Singing Marine (1937) - First Marine Sergeant
- Big City (1937) - Detective Miller (uncredited)
- Ali Baba Goes to Town (1937) - Officer (uncredited)
- Stand-In (1937) - Studio Employee (uncredited)
- Thoroughbreds Don't Cry (1937) - Racetrack Guard (uncredited)
- Courage of the West (1937) - Al Wilkins, aka Jed Newman
- The Singing Outlaw (1937) - Leonard Cueball Qualey
- Wells Fargo (1937) - Timekeeper (uncredited)
- The Buccaneer (1938) - American Sergeant (uncredited)
- The Spy Ring (1938) - Capt. Holden
- Hawaiian Buckaroo (1938) - J. P. M'Tigue
- Rolling Caravans (1938) - Thad Dalton
- Joy of Living (1938) - Cop (uncredited)
- Stagecoach Days (1938) - Moose Ringo
- Panamint's Bad Man (1938) - Craven
- Men with Wings (1938) - Baker (uncredited)
- The Texans (1938) - Cavalry Officer (uncredited)
- Block-Heads (1938) - Belligerent Neighbor (uncredited)
- Crime Takes a Holiday (1938) - Stoddard
- In Early Arizona (1938) - Bull
- Come On, Rangers (1938) - Morgan Burke
- The Strange Case of Dr. Meade (1938) - Harper
- The Arizona Wildcat (1939) - Ross Harper
- Mr. Moto in Danger Island (1939) - Grant
- Union Pacific (1939) - Al Brett
- Blue Montana Skies (1939) - Jim Hendricks
- In Old Caliente (1939) - Curly Calkins
- The Man in the Iron Mask (1939) - First Officer
- Beau Geste (1939) - Renoir
- Frontier Marshal (1939) - Curly Bill's Henchman (uncredited)
- Days of Jesse James (1939) - Captain Worthington
- West of Carson City (1940) - Mack Gorman
- The House of the Seven Gables (1940) - Mr. Wainwright (uncredited)
- Boss of Bullion City (1940) - Sheriff Jeff Salters
- Isle of Destiny (1940) - Capt. Lawson
- Dark Command (1940) - Man in Fight with Seton (uncredited)
- Bullet Code (1940) - Cass Barton
- Winners of the West (1940, Serial) - King Carter
- South of Pago Pago (1940) - Black Mike Rafferty
- The Ranger and the Lady (1940) - Kincaid
- Triple Justice (1940) - Deputy Al Reeves
- The Long Voyage Home (1940) - Amindra First Mate (uncredited)
- Meet the Missus (1940) - Elmer Shillingford
- Petticoat Politics (1941) - Guy Markwell
- The Lady from Cheyenne (1941) - Assessor Mitch Harrigan (uncredited)
- Sheriff of Tombstone (1941) - Shotgun Cassidy
- Last of the Duanes (1941) - Sheriff Red Morgan
- Today I Hang (1942) - Henry Courtney
- Wild Bill Hickok Rides (1942) - Bixby - First Train Robber (uncredited)
- Reap the Wild Wind (1942) - Mace
- The Spoilers (1942) - Disgruntled Miner (uncredited)
- Romance on the Range (1942) - Steve
- Down Texas Way (1942) - Bert Logan
- Jackass Mail (1942) - Ranch Owner to Hang Baggot (uncredited)
- Riders of the West (1942) - Duke Mason
- Deep in the Heart of Texas (1942) - Sergeant Idaho
- West of the Law (1942) - Jim Rand
- The Forest Rangers (1942) - Lumberman (uncredited)
- Dawn on the Great Divide (1942) - Jim Corkle
- Sherlock Holmes and the Secret Weapon (1942) - Kurt (uncredited)
- The Ghost Rider (1943) - Lash Edwards
- Cheyenne Roundup (1943) - Blackie Dawson
- Bordertown Gun Fighters (1943) - Marshal Dave Strickland
- The Masked Marvel (1943, Serial) - Lab Thug (uncredited)
- Beyond the Last Frontier (1943) - Big Bill Hadley
- Outlaws of Stampede Pass (1943) - Ben Crowley
- In Old Oklahoma (1943) - Al Dalton (uncredited)
- Ali Baba and the Forty Thieves (1944) - Mongol Guard (uncredited)
- Westward Bound (1944) - Roger Caldwell
- Marshal of Gunsmoke (1944) - Lon Curtiss
- The Impostor (1944) - Guard (uncredited)
- Slightly Terrific (1944) - Gypsy King (uncredited)
- The Adventures of Mark Twain (1944) - Bixby's Depth-Caller (uncredited)
- Call of the Rockies (1944) - J. B. Murdock
- Silver City Kid (1944) - Judge Sam H. Ballard
- Tall in the Saddle (1944) - George Clews
- Can't Help Singing (1944) - Gunman Disliking Prying (uncredited)
- Nevada (1944) - Joe Powell
- Wanderer of the Wasteland (1945) - Guerd Eliott
- Flame of the West (1945) - Wilson
- Radio Stars on Parade (1945) - Rudy Campbell (uncredited)
- West of the Pecos (1945) - Brad Sawtelle
- South of Monterey (1946) - Bennet
- Sunset Pass (1946) - Cinnabar
- My Darling Clementine (1946) - Luke (uncredited)
- Trail Street (1947) - Larkin Larkin
- Code of the West (1947) - Marshal Nate Hatfield
- Thunder Mountain (1947) - Trimble Carson
- Wyoming (1947) - Ben Jackson
- The Secret Life of Walter Mitty (1947) - Wrong Mr. Follinsbee (uncredited)
- Black Gold (1947) - Smuggler (uncredited)
- Desire Me (1947) - Joseph (scenes deleted)
- The Fabulous Texan (1947) - State Policeman (uncredited)
- Wild Horse Mesa (1947) - Jay Olmstead
- Road to Rio (1947) - Ship's Purser
- Tycoon (1947) - Holden
- Western Heritage (1948) - Arnold posing as Powell
- Silver River (1948) - Riverboat Poker Player (uncredited)
- The Gallant Legion (1948) - Lang
- A Southern Yankee (1948) - Dentist (uncredited)
- Adventures of Don Juan (1948) - Guard (uncredited)
- Indian Agent (1948) - Carter
- One Sunday Afternoon (1948) - Matt Hughes - Policeman (uncredited)
- South of St. Louis (1949) - Recruiting Sergeant (uncredited)
- Hellfire (1949) - Lew Stoner
- Colorado Territory (1949) - Pluthner
- The Fountainhead (1949) - Quarry Superintendent (uncredited)
- She Wore a Yellow Ribbon (1949) - Karl Rynders (uncredited)
- Masked Raiders (1949) - Marshal Barlow
- Samson and Delilah (1949) - Gammad (uncredited)
- The Traveling Saleswoman (1950) - Soap Factory Mechanic (uncredited)
- Backfire (1950) - Dick Manning - Man from Detroit (uncredited)
- Let's Dance (1950) - Police Lieutenant (uncredited)
- Short Grass (1950) - Sam Dreen
- Law of the Badlands (1951) - Burt Conroy
- Best of the Badmen (1951) - Cherokee Springs Trading Post Proprietor (uncredited)
- Lone Star (1952) - George Dellman
- Rancho Notorious (1952) - Marshal McDonald (uncredited)
- Ride the Man Down (1952) - Henchman (uncredited)
- Hell's Outpost (1954) - Deputy Lud (uncredited)
- The Last Command (1955) - Irate Texan in Cantina (uncredited)
- The Ten Commandments (1956) - Officer (uncredited)
- The Restless Breed (1957) - Frank Baker (uncredited)
- Gunsmoke TV Series (1957) - Episode "Who Lives By The Sword" as Snyder
- The Sheepman (1958) - Cattle Rancher in Restaurant (uncredited)
- Bat Masterson TV Series (1959) - Episode "Lady Luck" as Mr. Morgan
- Bat Masterson TV Series (1961) - Episode "Run For Your Money" as Doc R.W. Fleming
