= Cyclone of the Range =

1927 film

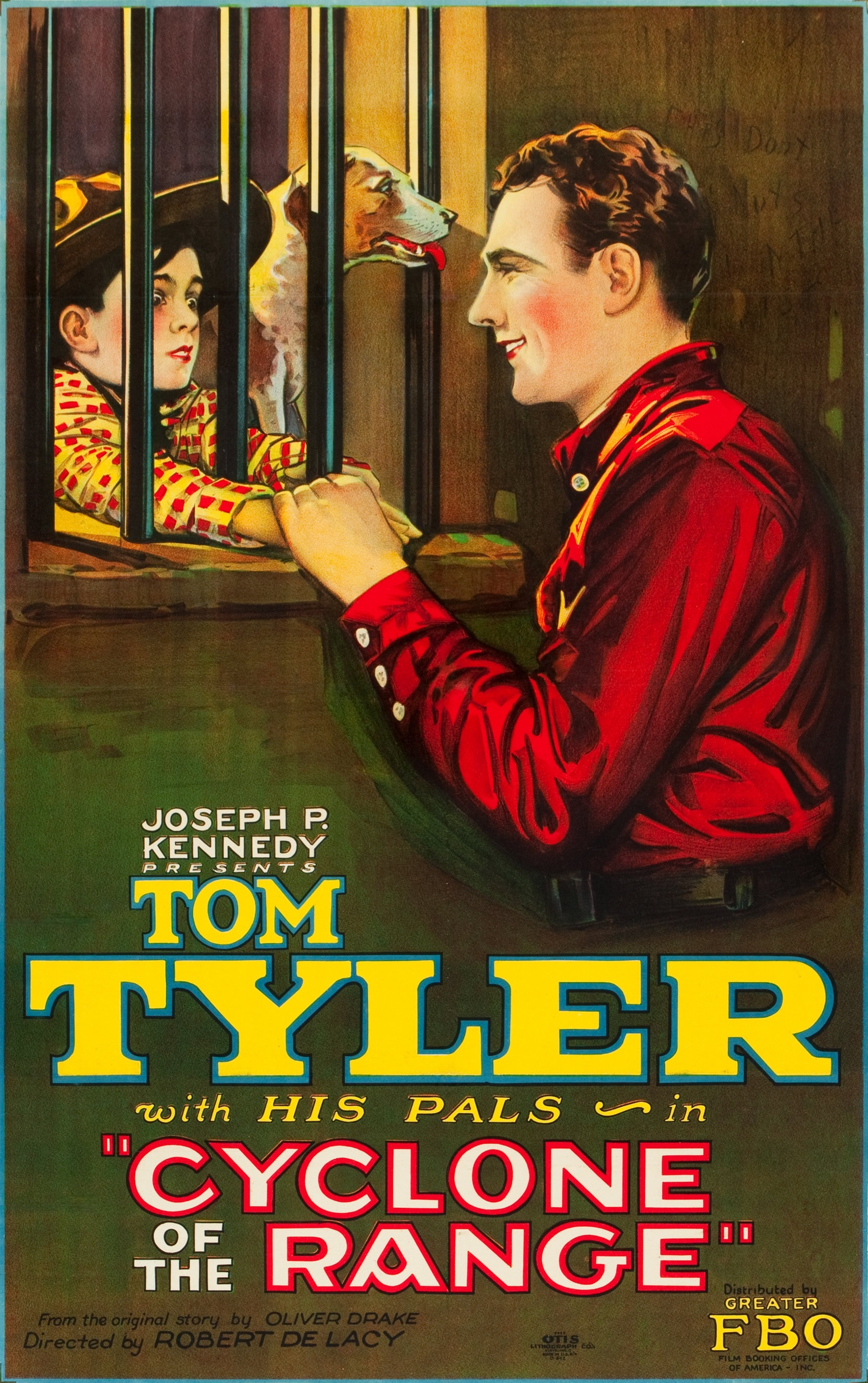
- Directed by: Robert De Lacey
- Written by: Oliver Drake; F.A.E. Pine; Arthur F. Statter
- Produced by: Joseph P. Kennedy; Robert N. Bradbury
- Starring: Tom Tyler; Elsie Tarron; Frankie Darro
- Cinematography: Harry Mason
- Production company: Robertson-Cole Pictures Corporation
- Distributed by: Film Booking Offices of America
- Release date: April 24, 1927
- Running time: 55 minutes
- Country: United States
- Languages: Silent; English intertitles

Cyclone of the Range is a 1927 American silent Western film directed by Robert De Lacey and starring Tom Tyler, Elsie Tarron, and Frankie Darro.

== Cast ==
- Tom Tyler as Tom MacKay
- Elsie Tarron as Mollie Butler
- Harry O'Connor as Seth Butler
- Richard Howard as Jake Dakin
- Frankie Darro as Frankie Butler
- Harry Woods as The Black Rider / Don Alvarado

== Plot ==
Tom MacKay, boy Frankie Butler and his sister Mollie, and Tom's faithful dog, Beans are searching for a villain, known only as the "Black Rider," who murdered Tom's father.
