= Little Pal =

Little Pal may refer to:

- The Healer (1935 film), also known as Little Pal, an American film directed by Reginald Barker
- Little Pal (1915 film), a 1915 American silent drama film
