= King Cowboy =

1928 film

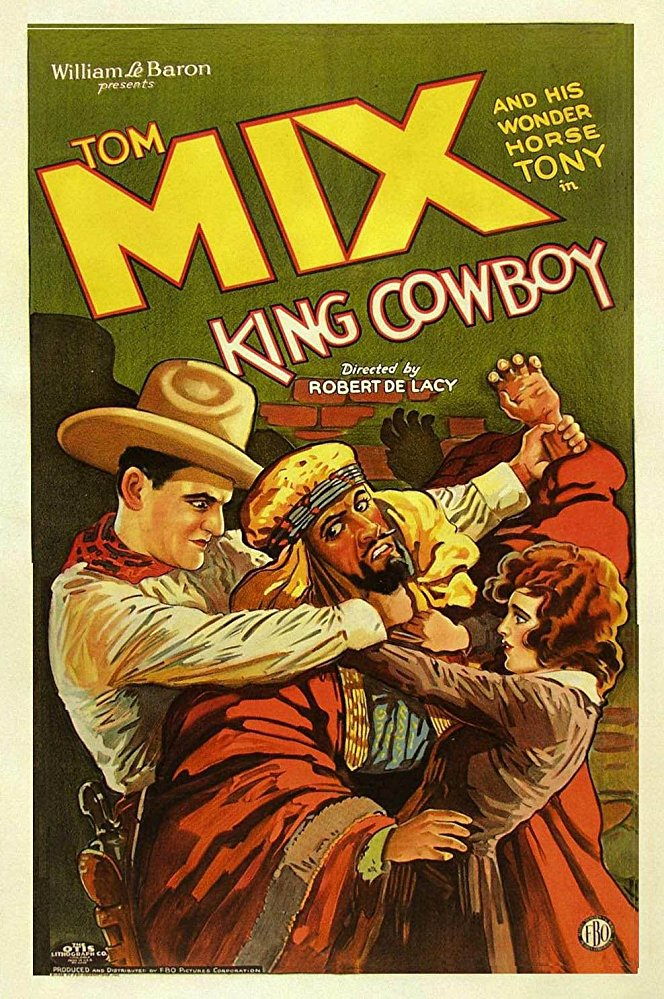
- Directed by: Robert De Lacey
- Written by: Stanner E.V. Taylor; Frank Howard Clark; Helen Gregg; Randolph Bartlett
- Produced by: William LeBaron
- Starring: Tom Mix; Sally Blane; Lew Meehan
- Cinematography: Norman Devol
- Edited by: Henry Weber; Ted Cheesman
- Production company: FBO
- Distributed by: FBO
- Release date: November 26, 1928
- Running time: 65 minutes
- Country: United States
- Languages: Silent; English intertitles

King Cowboy is a 1928 American silent Western film directed by Robert De Lacey and starring Tom Mix, Sally Blane and Lew Meehan. A complete copy of King Cowboy exists.

== Cast ==
- Tom Mix as Tex Rogers
- Tony the Wonder Horse as Tex's Horse Tony
- Sally Blane as Polly Randall
- Lew Meehan as Ralph Bennett
- Barney Furey as 'Shorty' Sims
- Frank Leigh as Abdul El Hassan
- Wynn Mace as Ben Suliman Ali
- Bob Fleming as Jim Randall

== Bibliography ==
- Jensen, Richard D. The Amazing Tom Mix: The Most Famous Cowboy of the Movies. 2005.
