= Tyrant of Red Gulch =

1928 film

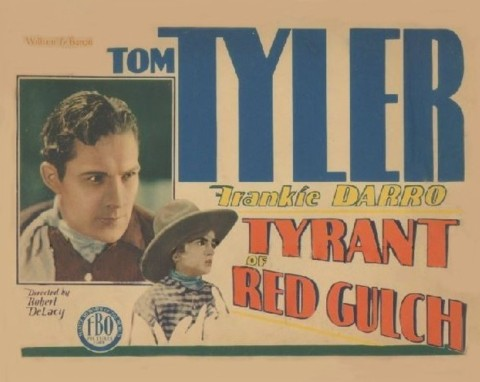
- Directed by: Robert De Lacey
- Written by: Oliver Drake; Randolph Bartlett
- Produced by: Robert N. Bradbury
- Starring: Tom Tyler; Frankie Darro; Josephine Borio
- Cinematography: Nicholas Musuraca
- Edited by: Jay Joiner
- Production company: FBO
- Distributed by: FBO
- Release date: November 25, 1928
- Running time: 50 minutes
- Country: United States
- Languages: Silent; English intertitles

Tyrant of Red Gulch, also known as The Sorcerer, is a 1928 American silent Western film directed by Robert De Lacey and starring Tom Tyler, Frankie Darro and Josephine Borio.

It was made by Joseph Kennedy's FBO studio, soon to be merged into the much larger RKO organization.

== Premise ==
A gang working on behalf of a foreign government use slave labor to exploit a secret mine.

== Cast ==
- Tom Tyler as Tom Masters
- Frankie Darro as 'Tip'
- Josephine Borio as Mitza
- Harry Woods as Ivan Petrovitch
- Serge Temoff as Boris Kosloff
- Barney Furey as Anton

== Bibliography ==
- Langman, Larry. A Guide to Silent Westerns. Greenwood Publishing Group, 1992.
