= Headlines (1925 film) =

1925 film

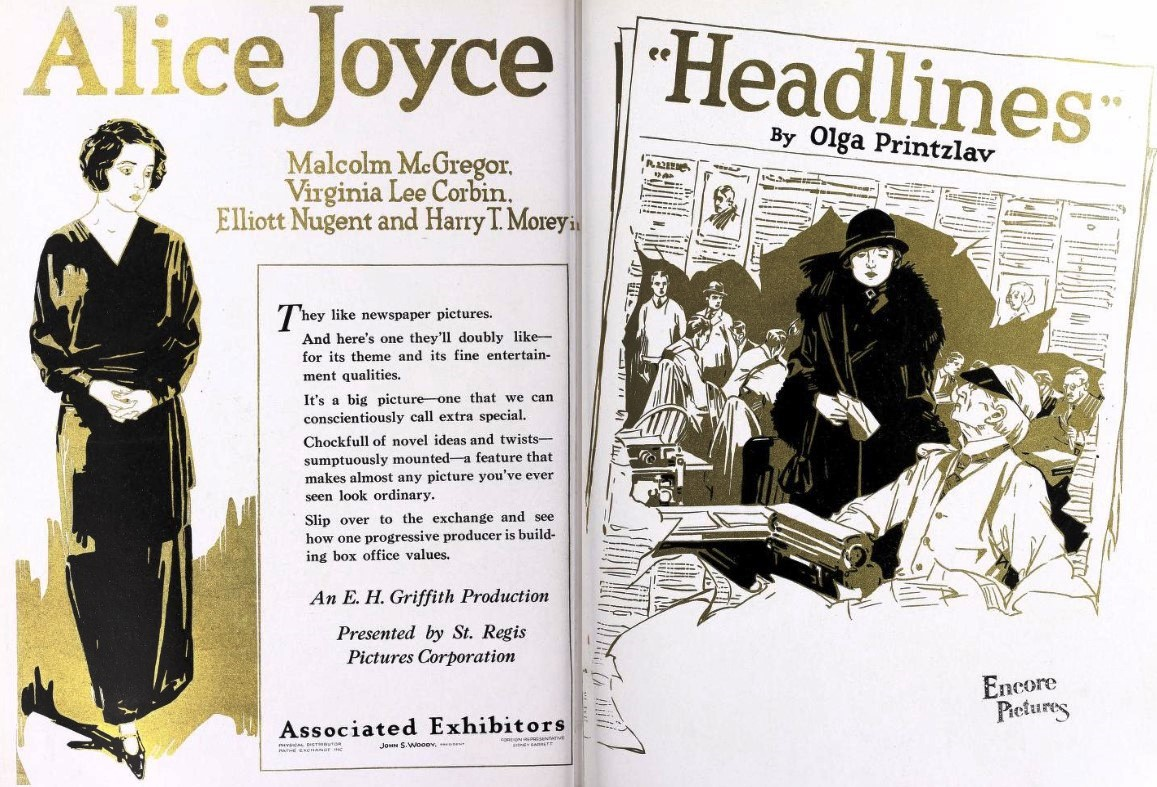
- Advertisement
- Directed by: Edward H. Griffith
- Written by: Peter Milne; Arthur Hoerl
- Based on: a story by Dorian Neve and Olga Printzlau
- Produced by: St. Regis Productions
- Starring: Alice Joyce; Malcolm McGregor
- Cinematography: Marcel Le Picard; Walter Arthur
- Distributed by: Associated Exhibitors; Pathé Exchange
- Release date: July 16, 1925
- Running time: 6 reels
- Country: United States
- Language: Silent (English intertitles)

Headlines is a 1925 American silent adventure and crime drama film directed by Edward H. Griffith and starring Alice Joyce and Malcolm McGregor. It was distributed through Pathé Exchange.

== Plot ==
As described in a film magazine review, Phyllis Dale is a young widowed author and newspaper writer, respected and admired by Lawrence Emmett. Bobby, her young flapper daughter, has an interesting “line” that she uses on all men. When she tries it on Emmett, he whims her. Phyllis thinks Bobby has supplanted her in his affections and decides to step aside in Bobby's interest. Soon after, Bobby innocently steps in for a moment to the apartment of one of her loose-moraled friends. His wife is looking for a co-respondent in her forthcoming divorce proceedings. Phyllis accidentally learns where Bobby is and hastens to the apartment, only to become enmeshed herself. Bobby, thoroughly and sincerely conscience-stricken by the turn of affairs and realizing how much her mother was willing to sacrifice for her, vindicates Phyllis in the eyes of Emmett, who has followed her to the apartment, and marries the editor of the local newspaper who has suppressed the scandalous headlines.

== Cast ==
- Alice Joyce as Phyllis Dale
- Malcolm McGregor as Lawrence Emmett
- Virginia Lee Corbin as Bobby Dale
- Harry T. Morey as Donald Austin
- Ruby Blaine as Stella Austin
- Elliott Nugent as Roger Hillman

== Preservation ==
Prints of Headlines survive in the Library of Congress and EYE Film Institute Netherlands.
