= Gun-Hand Garrison =

1927 film

- Directed by: Edward Gordon
- Written by: Arthur Hoerl
- Produced by: Trem Carr
- Starring: Kermit Maynard; Ruby Blaine; Jack Anthony
- Cinematography: Hap Depew
- Production company: Trem Carr Pictures
- Distributed by: Rayart Pictures
- Release date: October 1927
- Running time: 50 minutes
- Country: United States
- Languages: Silent; English intertitles

Gun-Hand Garrison is a 1927 American silent Western film directed by Edward Gordon and starring Kermit Maynard, Ruby Blaine and Jack Anthony.

== Plot ==
According to a film magazine, “Gun-Hand” Garrison, a clean-cut young cowhand, rides through town, and soon comes upon “Daddy” Bates who is getting the worst of an argument with a group of men. The old man explains that this is the Lydecker ranch where he has been given permission to squat, but is being ousted by Lew Johnston. Garrison then rides up to the ranch house, and is mistaken as the surveyor by Brenda Lydecker, the owner of the ranch. They are joined by Jim, her brother, who tells Garrison he may stay there and work. Joshua Mayne, the big man of the town, is the real power behind Johnston. Mayne wants the ranch — Lew can have the girl. Mayne has been trying to get the ranch even before John Lydecker was killed. A few days later, Garrison joins a card game with a couple of Johnson’s men who plan to frame him; he gets the drop on them all. In the meantime Mayne is killed, and Garrison, believing Jim to be the murderer, shields him. But the real murderer, who is Johnston, is finally revealed by his own men; and as “Gun-Hand” takes the girl of his heart into his arms, Brenda decides it is a lucky day for them all."

== Cast ==
- Kermit Maynard as "Gun-Hand" Garrison (as Tex Maynard)
- Ruby Blaine as Brenda
- Jack Anthony
- Charles O'Malley
- Charles Schaeffer
- Edward Heim
- A.E. Witting
- Paul Malvern

== Reception ==
Variety called Gun-Hand Garrison a "fair to middling westerner" and said it contained "the usual formula about crooks after the property of innocent people and blaming their own murders on others." The reviewer described the direction of the film as "ragged and careless," but they praised Maynard for his personality onscreen.
