= Lightning Lariats =

1927 film

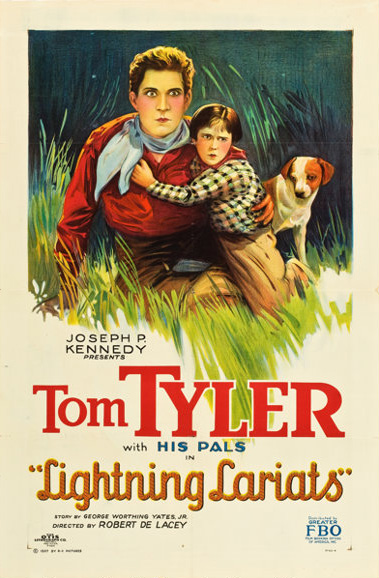
- Directed by: Robert De Lacey
- Written by: George Worthing Yates (story); F.A.E. Pine
- Produced by: Joseph P. Kennedy; Robert N. Bradbury
- Starring: Tom Tyler; Dorothy Dunbar; Frankie Darro
- Cinematography: Nicholas Musuraca
- Production company: Robertson-Cole Pictures Corporation
- Distributed by: Film Booking Offices of America
- Release date: January 30, 1927
- Running time: 50 minutes
- Country: United States
- Languages: Silent; English intertitles

Lightning Lariats is a 1927 American silent Western film directed by Robert De Lacey and starring Tom Tyler, Dorothy Dunbar and Frankie Darro.

== Plot ==
Following a revolution in his Balkan country, King Alexis escapes to the American West in the company of his American governess where he receives the help of a cowboy to thwart an attempt to kidnap him.

== Cast ==
- Tom Tyler as Tom Potter
- Dorothy Dunbar as Janet Holbrooke
- Frankie Darro as Alexis, King of Roxenburg
- Ruby Blaine as Cynthia Storne
- Fred Holmes as Henry Storne
- Ervin Renard as First Officer
- Karl Silvera as Second Officer
- Leroy Scott as Gus
- Gertrude Astor as Girl
