= Pardon My Gun (1930 film) =

1930 film

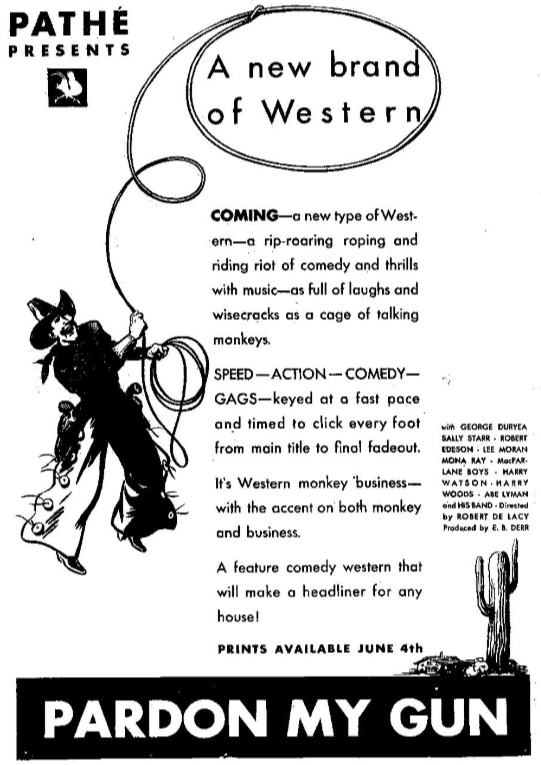
- Advertisement
- Directed by: Robert De Lacey
- Written by: Hugh Cummings; Betty Scott (story) (uncredited); Eugene Walter
- Produced by: E.B. Derr (producer)
- Starring: Sally Starr; Tom Keene (as George Duryea
- Cinematography: Edward Snyder
- Edited by: Fred Allen
- Production company: Pathé Exchange
- Distributed by: Pathé Exchange
- Release date: October 5, 1930
- Running time: 67 minutes
- Country: United States
- Language: English

Pardon My Gun is a 1930 American pre-Code romantic comedy Western film directed by Robert De Lacey, starring Sally Starr, and Tom Keene (as George Duryea). This was the last time Keene worked under his real name, George Duryea.

== Cast ==
- Sally Starr as Mary Martin
- Tom Keene as Ted Duncan
- Mona Ray as Peggy Martin
- Lee Moran as Jeff Potter
- Robert Edeson as Pa Martin
- Hank MacFarlane as Hank Martin
- Tom MacFarlane as Tom Martin
- Harry Woods as Cooper
- Abe Lyman as Band Leader
- Frank Clark as Race Spectator (uncredited)
- Gordon De Main as Rancher (uncredited)
- Ethan Laidlaw as Tex (uncredited)
- Murdock MacQuarrie as Cattle Rancher (uncredited)
- Lew Meehan as Denver (uncredited)
- Dorothy Vernon as Mrs. Weatherby (uncredited)
- Harry Watson as Banjo Player (uncredited)

== Production ==
Pardon My Gun was largely filmed on Lone Pine Ranch near Mt. Whitney.

== Soundtrack ==
- "Deep Down South" (music by George Green, lyrics by Monte Collins)
