= Ruby Blaine =

American actress (1903–1976)

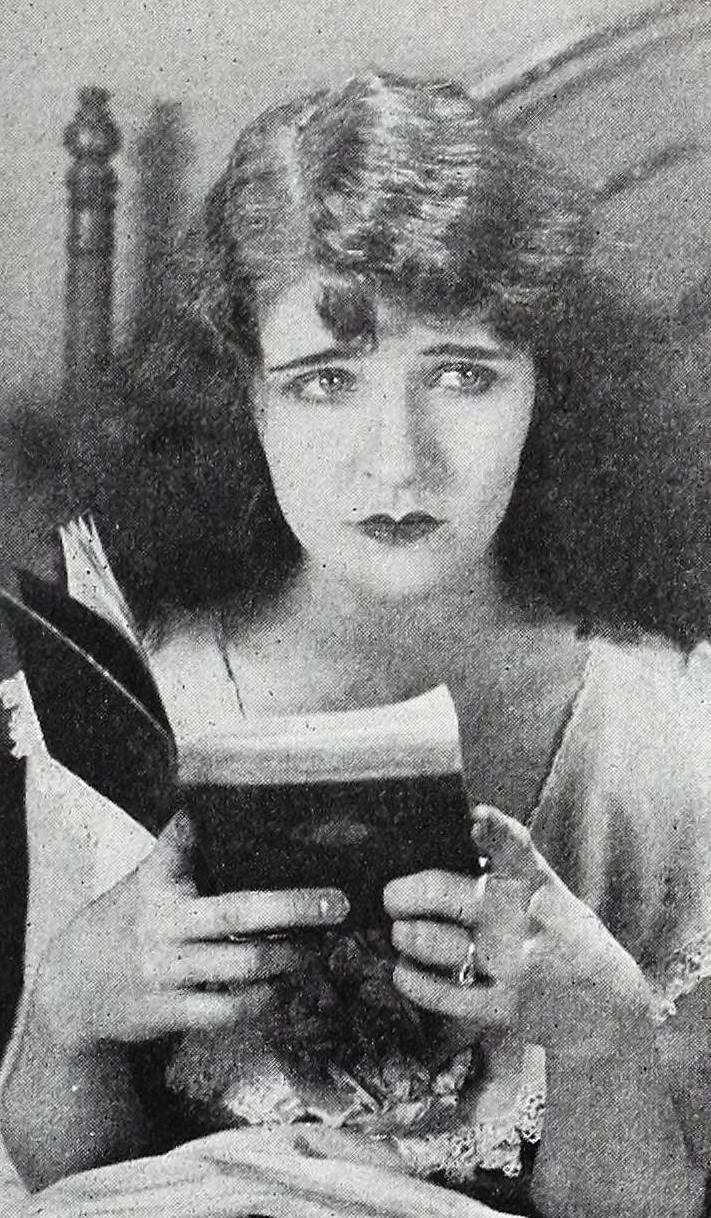
- Blaine in The Midnight Girl (1925)
- Born: August 27, 1903; Hutchinson, Kansas, United States
- Died: May 31, 1976 (aged 72); Florida, United States
- Occupation: Actress
- Years active: 1925-1928 (film)

Ruby Blaine (August 27, 1903 – May 31, 1976) was an American film actress of the silent era.

== Early life ==
Born Ruby F. Blain on August 27, 1903, in Hutchinson, Kansas, she was one of nine children. The family moved to Colorado while she was still very young. She competed in a local rodeo when she was sixteen years old, which contributed to her later being cast in Western films.

== Career and life ==
Blaine acted in films of various genres from 1925 to 1929. She first moved to New York in 1924, where she worked as a dancer and won the title of Miss New York. She played several minor and supporting roles in films directed by the likes of Wilfred Noy, Alfred Santell, D. W. Griffith, and James Parrott.

She married Irving Weinberg, a millionaire stockbroker, in 1927 but they ultimately divorced in 1930. He married another actress three years later. Blaine worked as a model and hostess in New York City nightclubs after her divorce.

== Death and legacy ==
Blaine died of natural causes in Florida on May 31, 1976. She was cremated.

== Complete filmography ==
- The Midnight Girl (1925)
- Headlines (1925)
- Children of the Whirlwind (1925)
- Bluebeard's Seven Wives (1926)
- The Quarterback (1926, uncredited)
- The Sorrows of Satan (1926)
- Lightning Lariats (1927)
- Bitter Apples (1927)
- The Terror of Bar X (1927)
- Gun-Hand Garrison (1927)
- Wild Born (1927)
- Ridin' Luck (1927)
- Two Tars (1928, short)
- The Booster (1928, short)
- School Begins (1928)
- Is Everybody Happy? (1929, short)

== Bibliography ==
- Munden, Kenneth White. The American Film Institute Catalog of Motion Pictures Produced in the United States, Part 1. University of California Press, 1997.
