= Eleanor Blevins =

Early American actress and race car driver

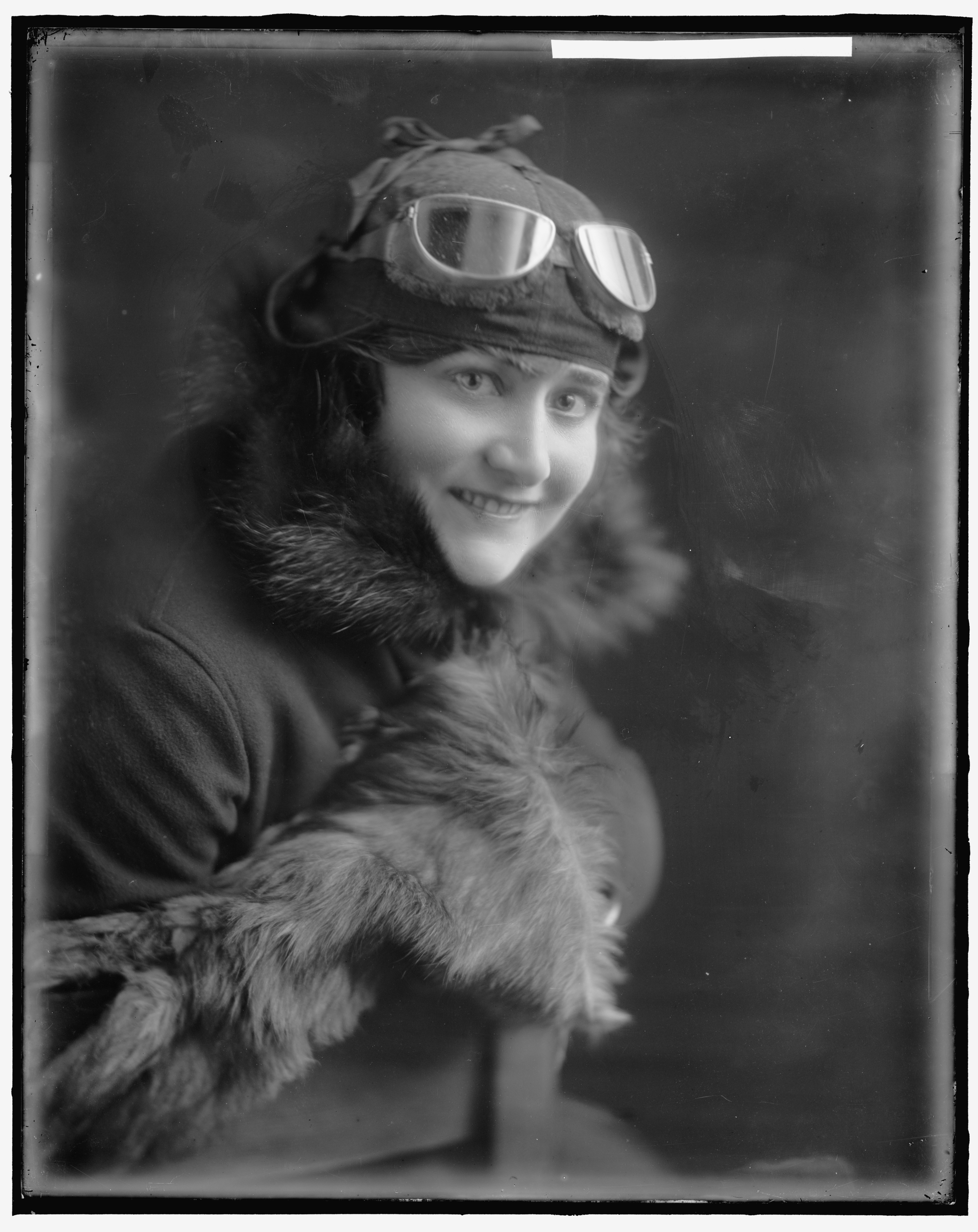
- Born: April 27, 1894; Lincoln, Nebraska, U.S.
- Died: September 30, 1973 (aged 79); Idaho Falls, Idaho, U.S.
- Occupation: Actress

Eleanor Blevins (April 27, 1894 - September 30, 1973) was an early movie actress from 1913 to 1916, starring in at least 24 short films some of which were "The Schoolmarm of Green River" (1913), "A Friend in Need" (1914), "The Love Transcendent" (1915) and "The Valley of Humiliation" (1915). None are known to have survived. Starting in 1916, she began a career as a racing driver, a unique profession for a woman of that time period.

== Early life ==
Blevins was born on April 27, 1894 in Lincoln, Nebraska. Her parents separated sometime before 1900 and, by 1910, Eleanor was living with her mother in Los Angeles.

== Acting career ==
In 1913, Eleanor was acting in movies, usually in the role of a daughter or sweetheart. She was known as "Peg of the Movies."

Her earliest starring role may have been "The New Schoolmarm of Green River" that was directed by Gilbert M. 'Broncho Billy' Anderson for Essanay. It was released in October 1913 when she was 21 years old.

She was one of the troupe in a 1914 Tom Mix comedy Western titled "The Motion Picture Cowboy" and in a 1915 comedy directed by Hal Roach for Essanay, titled "Tale of a Tire".

== Racing ==
Sometime during 1916 Blevins started to race cars. Blevins drove the same car throughout her racing career; it was called the Stutz Weightman Special, produced by William "Wild Bill" Weightman. The vehicle was a right-hand drive model designed for high speeds. It featured a special aerodynamic modification with a boat tail design.

In December, her vehicle broke down with her mechanic calling a friend of his to assist. That was Herbert Betts who helped to get her car running but made a friendly wager of $1000, a large sum at the time, that she wouldn't finish the race. She did finish and he paid the bet giving her a check and marriage proposal, both she accepted.

== Personal life ==
Blevins and Betts married in January 1917 in Philadelphia but he died only a few months later, at the age of 36.

In 1924, Eleanor married Ralph Albaugh in Virginia City, Montana. They are listed as having two adopted children, Thomas and Helen. In 1926, Eleanor and Ralph built a cabin called "Ziz-Ziz-Zit" southwest of Yellowstone National Park. In 2020, it was placed on The National Register of Historic Places in Idaho "an early vacation cabin / summer residence in the resort area of Island Park.

Blevins died on September 30, 1973 in Idaho Falls, Idaho. She was 79.

== Bibliography ==
- Macy, Sue. "Motor Girls: How Women Took the wheel and drove boldly into the twentieth Century." National Geographic Washington, D.C., 2017.
- Kimes, Beverly Rae & Clark Jr., Henry Austin. "Standard Catalog of American Cars 1805-1942." October, 1988.
