= Children of the Whirlwind =

1925 film

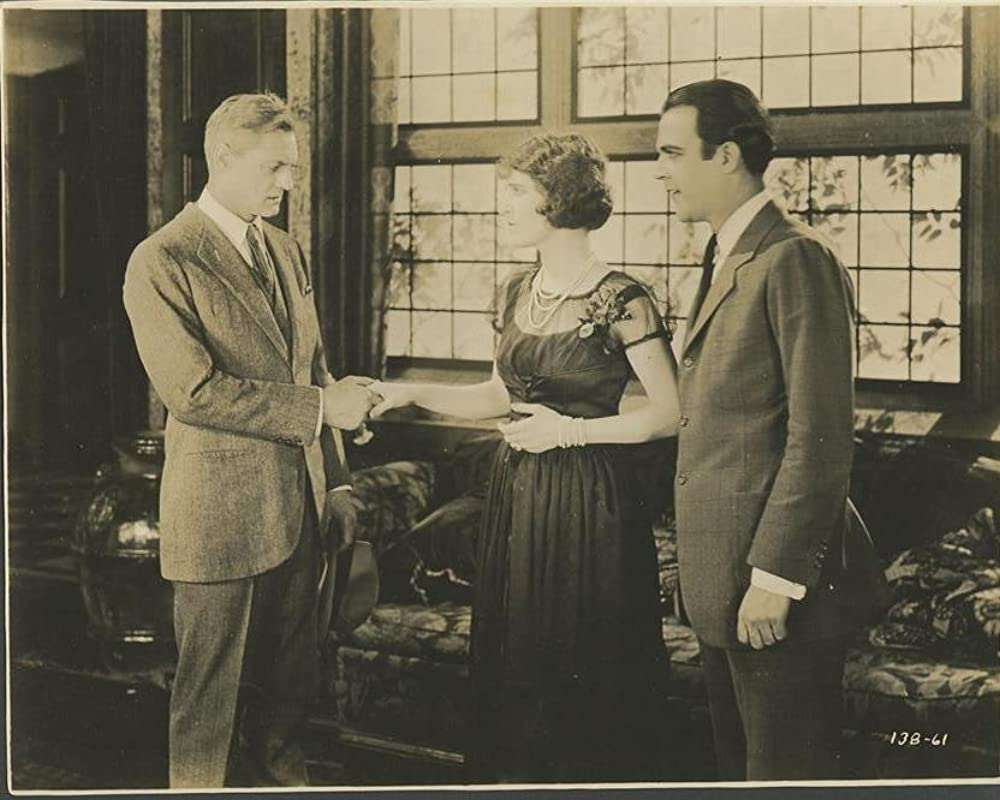
- Still with Lionel Barrymore, Marguerite De La Motte, and Johnnie Walker
- Directed by: Whitman Bennett
- Written by: Leroy Scott
- Produced by: Whitman Bennett
- Starring: Lionel Barrymore; Johnnie Walker; Marguerite De La Motte
- Cinematography: Edward Paul
- Production company: Whitman Bennett Productions
- Distributed by: Arrow Film Corporation
- Release date: August 15, 1925
- Running time: 70 minutes
- Country: United States
- Language: Silent (English intertitles)

Children of the Whirlwind is a 1925 American silent crime drama film directed by Whitman Bennett and starring Lionel Barrymore, Johnnie Walker, and Marguerite De La Motte.

== Plot ==
As described in a film magazine review, a young man freshly released from Sing Sing goes straight with the help of a friendly artist, but his old gang, including his sweetheart, accuse him of informing and plan to blackmail his benefactor. The young woman's father, a convict pal of the younger man, the father of his sweetheart, is released from prison also and determines to kill one of the crooks, whom he paid to keep the young woman straight. However, the turn of events sets aright the affairs of everyone excepting those who refused to reform.

== Cast ==
- Lionel Barrymore as Joe Ellison
- Johnnie Walker as Larry Brainerd
- Marguerite De La Motte as Maggie
- J.R. Roser as Hunt
- Marie Haynes as The Duchess
- Bert Tuey as Barney
- Frank Montgomery as Carlisle
- Ruby Blaine as Isabel Sherwood

== Bibliography ==
- Munden, Kenneth White. The American Film Institute Catalog of Motion Pictures Produced in the United States, Part 1. University of California Press, 1997.
