= Two Tars =

1928 film by James Parrott

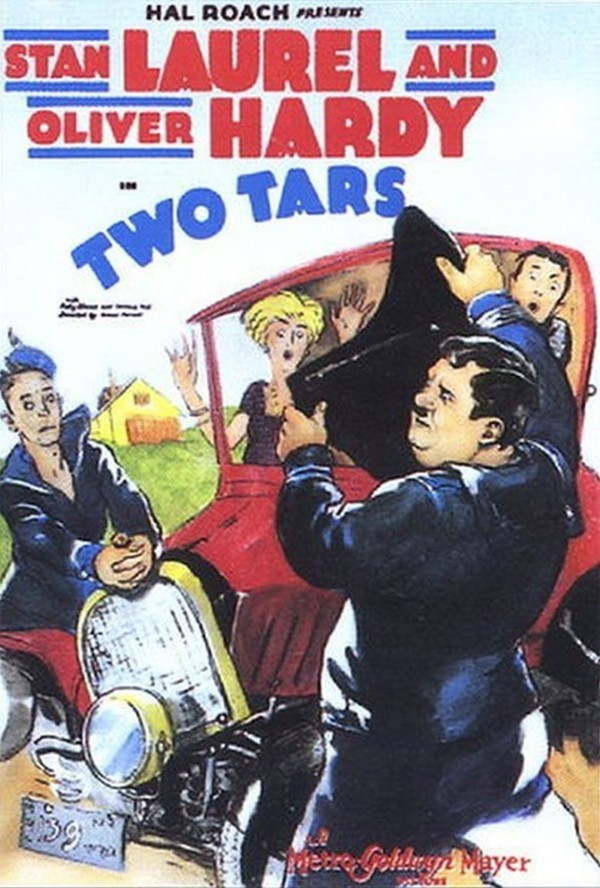
- Directed by: James Parrott
- Written by: Leo McCarey (story); H.M. Walker (titles)
- Produced by: Hal Roach
- Starring: Stan Laurel; Oliver Hardy; Charlie Hall; Edgar Kennedy; Thelma Hill; Ruby Blaine; Harry Bernard; Chet Brandenburg; Baldwin Cooke; Edgar Dearing; Frank Ellis; Helen Gilmore; Clara Guiol; Jack Hill
- Cinematography: George Stevens
- Edited by: Richard C. Currier
- Distributed by: Metro-Goldwyn-Mayer
- Release date: November 3, 1928
- Running time: 21 minutes
- Country: United States
- Languages: Silent film English (Original intertitles)

Two Tars is a silent short subject directed by James Parrott starring comedy duo Laurel and Hardy. It was released by Metro-Goldwyn-Mayer on November 3, 1928.

== Plot ==
During a shore leave, two sailors opt to rent an automobile, with Laurel assuming the role of driver. However, his lack of proficiency behind the wheel leads to a near collision with a pedestrian at a street corner. Subsequently, Hardy takes over driving duties but promptly crashes the vehicle into a lamppost, prompting him to retreat in embarrassment. Their misadventures continue as they encounter two young women struggling with a malfunctioning vending machine. Hardy's attempt to resolve the situation results in the machine's destruction, exacerbating the situation.

Their actions draw the ire of the store proprietor, leading to a chaotic encounter where Laurel and Hardy find themselves entangled in the escalating conflict. Despite their efforts to flee, they inadvertently become embroiled in a larger-scale altercation involving numerous motorists. This conflict quickly escalates into a chaotic exchange of vehicular damage and improvised weaponry.

The arrival of law enforcement is met with further chaos, as a steamroller inadvertently incapacitates the officer's motorcycle. Seizing the opportunity, Laurel and Hardy escape into a nearby railway tunnel, leaving behind a trail of vehicular wreckage.

== Cast ==
- Stan Laurel - Stan
- Oliver Hardy - Ollie
- Edgar Kennedy - Motorist
- Thelma Hill - Brunette girl
- Ruby Blaine - Blonde girl
- Harry Bernard - Truck driver
- Chet Brandenburg - Motorist
- Baldwin Cooke - Motorist
- Edgar Dearing - Motorcycle policeman
- Frank Ellis - Motorist
- Helen Gilmore - Motorist
- Clara Guiol - Motorist
- Charlie Hall -Shopkeeper
- Jack Hill - Motorist with mattress
- Fred Holmes - Motorist
- Ham Kinsey
- Sam Lufkin
- Charles McMurphy
- Retta Palmer
- Lon Poff
- Thomas Benton Roberts
- Charley Rogers
- George Rowe
- Lyle Tayo

== Production ==
One of the most elaborate silent comedy shorts, Two Tars was filmed as a three reel (30-minute) comedy originally called Two Tough Tars and edited down to 20 minutes. The opening scenes were shot on Main Street in Culver City, and the car battle scenes were filmed in Santa Monica along what is now Centinela Avenue.

== Sons of the Desert ==
Chapters — called Tents — of The Sons of the Desert, the international Laurel and Hardy Appreciation Society, all take their names from L&H films. There are four Two Tars Tents in Solingen, Germany; Guernsey, Channel Islands; North Illinois/Wisconsin Border; and Philadelphia, Pennsylvania. A fifth Two Tars Tent was established in Reidsville, North Carolina, but is no longer active.
