= The Pride of Pawnee =

1929 film

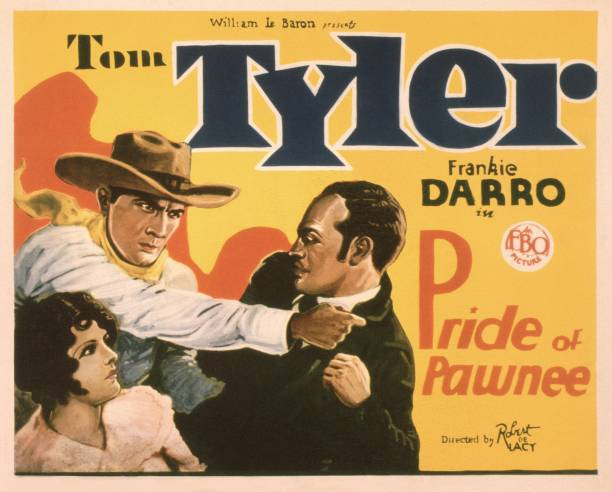
- Directed by: Robert De Lacey
- Written by: Frank Howard Clark; Helen Gregg; Joseph Kane
- Starring: Tom Tyler; Ethlyne Clair; Barney Furey
- Cinematography: Nicholas Musuraca
- Edited by: Jack Kitchin
- Production company: Film Booking Offices of America
- Distributed by: Film Booking Offices of America
- Release date: June 9, 1929
- Running time: 60 minutes
- Country: United States
- Languages: Silent; English intertitles

The Pride of Pawnee is a 1929 American silent Western film directed by Robert De Lacey and starring Tom Tyler, Ethlyne Clair and Barney Furey.

== Cast ==
- Tom Tyler as Kirk Stockton
- Ethlyne Clair as Madge Wilson
- Barney Furey as Scotty Wilson
- Frankie Darro as Jerry Wilson
- Jack Hilliard as George La Forte
- Lew Meehan as André Jeel
- Jimmy Casey as Jeel's Henchman

== Bibliography ==
- Darby, William. Masters of Lens and Light: A Checklist of Major Cinematographers and Their Feature Films. Scarecrow Press, 1991.
