= Bert Hadley =

American actor (1882–1968)

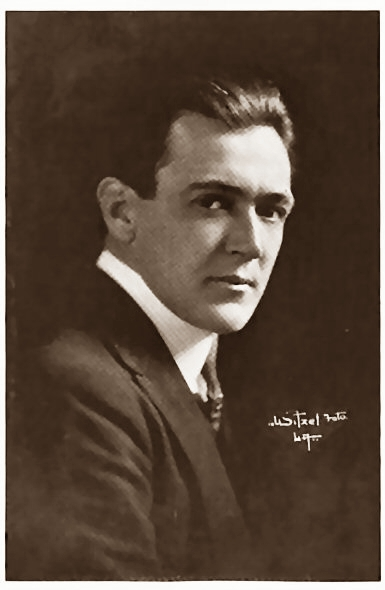
- Who's Who in the Film World, 1914
- Born: Robert C. Hadley; April 12, 1882; Walla Walla, Washington, US
- Died: December 30, 1968 (aged 86); Los Angeles, California, US
- Occupation(s): Stage and Screen Actor, Studio Makeup Artist
- Spouse: Zena Hadley (1904–1968)

Robert C. Hadley (April 12, 1882 – December 30, 1968) was an American stage and early silent film actor who appeared in over sixty motion pictures between 1912 and 1927. Hadley quit acting as he approached middle age to later become a successful Hollywood makeup artist.

== Biography ==
Robert C. Hadley was born on April 12, 1882, in Walla Walla, Washington; the first child of William and Amanda Hadley. His father, who was born of English parents, hailed from Michigan and supported his family as a farmer and day laborer. He married native Kansan Amanda Goble in or around 1880 and the two went on to raise seven children.

In the late 1890s Hadley's family moved temporally to Lewiston, Idaho where he first took to the stage. He later spent two seasons playing villains with the Dell Lawrence Stock Company that led to a season with the Curtis Comedy Company and engagements on the legitimate stage in theaters from Seattle to El Paso.

Hadley began his film career in 1912 with the Kay-Bee Broncho Company where he was remembered for playing the road agent in A Forlorn Hope and the spy in A Wartime Mother's Sacrifice, both released in 1913. With the Kalem Company he was given the convict role in the 1914 film A Convict's Story and appeared in a number of Carlyle Blackwell films. Other films of note that Hadley played in may include The Scarlet Pimpernel (1917), The Beggar Prince (1920), Three Gold Coins (1920), Down Home (1920), and Partners of the Tide (1921).

Though he would continue to appear in films for a number of years, Hadley began to transition his career away from acting as he approached his forties. He worked for a time as a film cutter, but eventually chose instead to be a studio makeup artist. By the late 1930s Hadley had become head of the makeup department at Paramount Studios and president of the union local that represented his craft.

Bert Hadley died in Los Angeles on December 30, 1968, nearly ten months after the death of Zena, his wife of nearly 64 years. The couple had two daughters, Fatima and Bert (or Burt); the latter also had a career in Hollywood as an actress and makeup artist.

== Partial filmography ==
- Little Pal (1915)
- Casey at the Bat (1916)
- Madam Who? (1918)
- The Beggar Prince (1920)
- 3 Gold Coins (1920)
- Down Home (1920)
- Trailin' (1921)
- Partners of the Tide (1921)
- The Lightning Rider (1924)
- The Flying U Ranch (1927)
