= Bitter Apples =

1927 film by Harry O. Hoyt

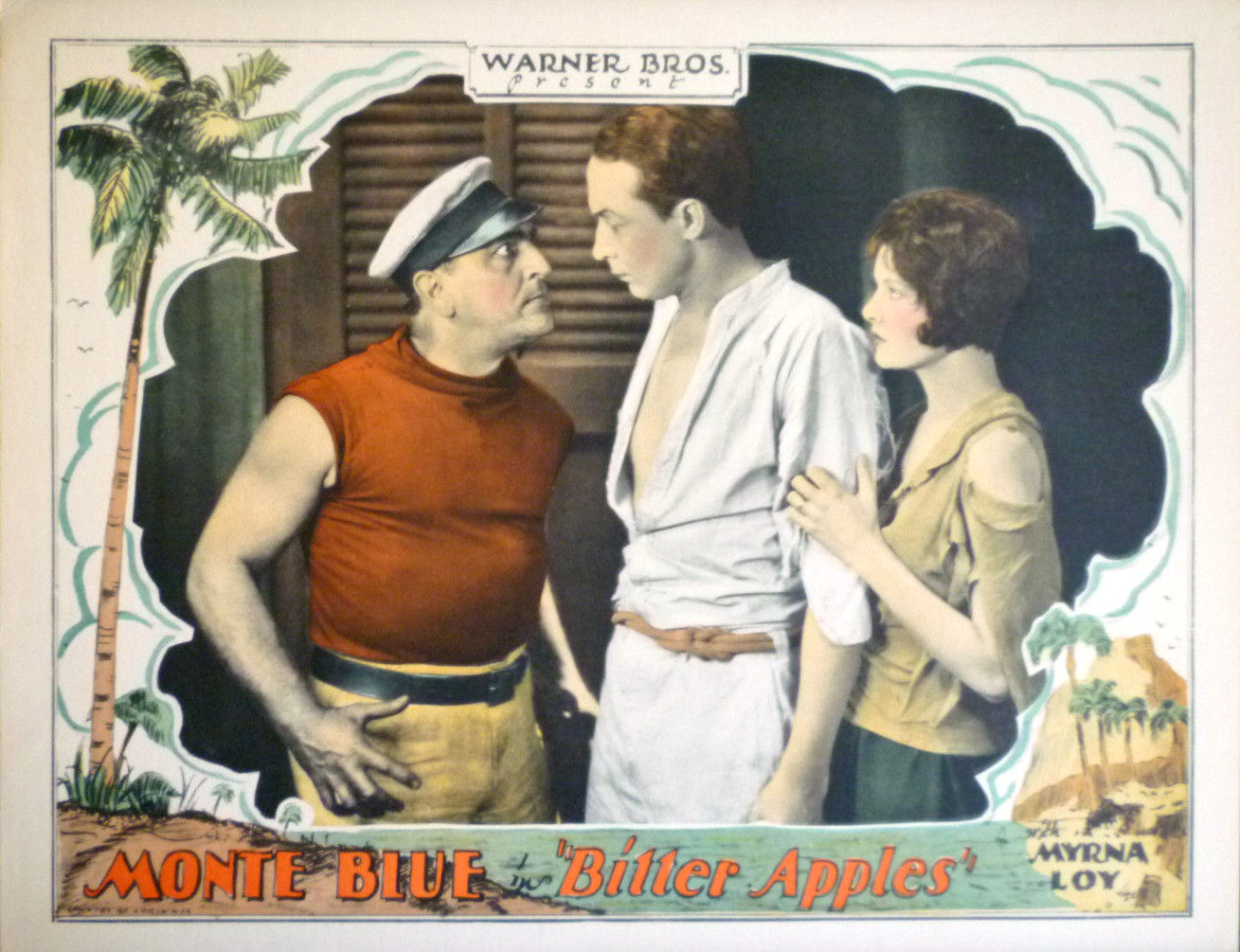
- Lobby card
- Directed by: Harry O. Hoyt
- Written by: Harry O. Hoyt
- Story by: Harold McGrath
- Starring: Monte Blue; Myrna Loy; Paul Ellis
- Cinematography: Hal Mohr
- Production company: Warner Bros.
- Distributed by: Warner Bros.
- Release date: April 23, 1927
- Running time: 6 reels
- Country: United States
- Language: Silent (English intertitles)

Bitter Apples is a 1927 American silent drama film directed by Harry O. Hoyt and starring Monte Blue, Myrna Loy, and Paul Ellis.

== Cast ==
- Monte Blue as John Wyncote
- Myrna Loy as Belinda White
- Paul Ellis as Stefani Blanco
- Charles Hill Mailes as Cyrus Thornden
- Sidney De Gray as Joseph Blanco
- Ruby Blaine as Mrs. Channing
- Patricia Grey as Wyncote's secretary

== Preservation status ==
The film is currently lost. In February 1956, Jack L. Warner sold the rights to all of his pre-December 1949 films to Associated Artists Productions. In 1969, United Artists donated 16mm prints of some Warner Bros. films from outside the United States. No copies of Bitter Apples are known to exist.
