= The Terror of Bar X =

1927 film

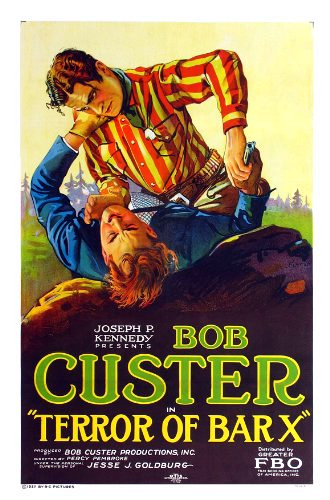
- Directed by: Scott Pembroke
- Written by: George M. Johnson; George M. Merrick; Ruth Todd
- Produced by: Joseph P. Kennedy
- Starring: Bob Custer\Ruby Blaine; William Ryno
- Cinematography: Ernest Miller
- Production company: Bob Custer Productions
- Distributed by: Film Booking Offices of America
- Release date: March 20, 1927
- Running time: 50 minutes
- Country: United States
- Languages: Silent; English intertitles

The Terror of Bar X is a lost 1927 American silent Western film directed by Scott Pembroke and starring Bob Custer, Ruby Blaine and William Ryno.

== Cast ==
- Bob Custer as Bob Willis
- Ruby Blaine as Dorothy Hunter
- William Ryno as Ross Hunter
- Jack Castle as Reginald Brooks
- Duke R. Lee as Jim Ashland
- Walter Maly as Hoke Channing
- Roy Bassett as Sheriff

== Reception ==
"Fine story and well cast.", commented the Exhibitors Herald.

== Preservation ==
With no holdings located in archives, The Terror of Bar X is considered a lost film.

== Bibliography ==
- Munden, Kenneth White. The American Film Institute Catalog of Motion Pictures Produced in the United States, Part 1. University of California Press, 1997.
