= The Flying U Ranch =

1927 film

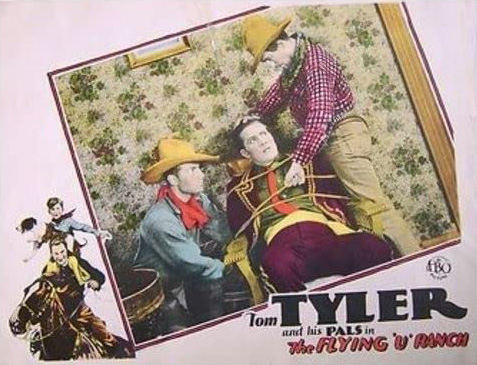
- Directed by: Robert De Lacey
- Written by: Bertha Muzzy Sinclair (novel); Oliver Drake
- Produced by: Joseph P. Kennedy
- Starring: Tom Tyler; Nora Lane; Bert Hadley
- Cinematography: Joseph Walker
- Production company: Film Booking Offices of America
- Distributed by: Film Booking Offices of America; Ideal Films (UK)
- Release date: September 4, 1927
- Running time: 50 minutes
- Country: United States
- Languages: Silent; English intertitles

The Flying U Ranch is a 1927 American silent Western film directed by Robert De Lacey and starring Tom Tyler, Nora Lane and Bert Hadley.

== Cast ==
- Tom Tyler as Señor Miguel García
- Nora Lane as Sally Denson
- Bert Hadley as Chip Bennett
- Grace Woods as The Little Doctor
- Frankie Darro as Chip Jr
- Olin Francis as Dunk Whitaker
- Barney Furey as Pink
- Dudley Hendricks as Weary
- Bill Patton as Happy Jack
