= Billie Bennett =

American actress

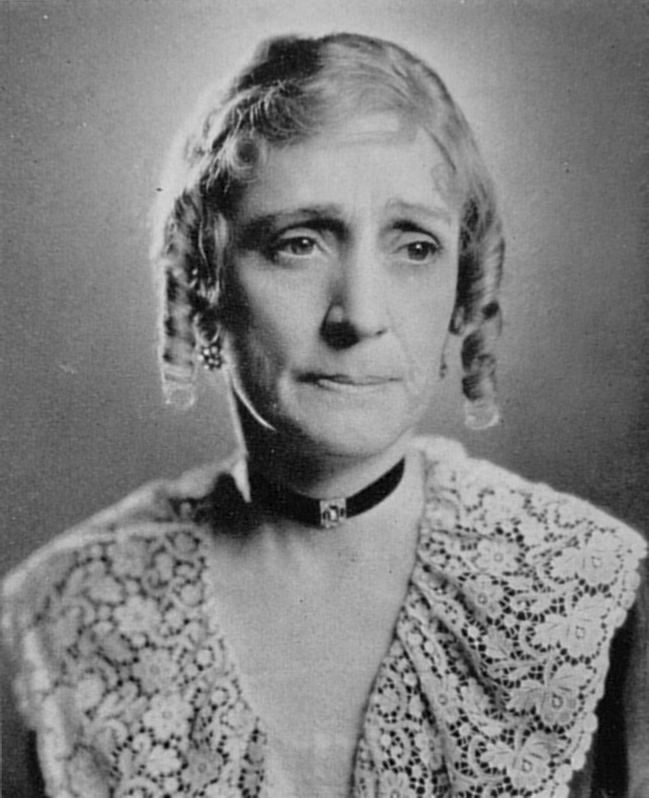
- Bennett in the pre-Code comedy One Romantic Night, 1930
- Born: Emily B. Haynie; October 23, 1874; Evansville, Indiana, US
- Died: May 19, 1951 (aged 76); Los Angeles, California, US
- Occupation: Actress
- Years active: 1913–1930

Billie Bennett (October 23, 1874 – May 19, 1951) was an American film actress of the silent era. She appeared in more than 50 films between 1913 and 1930. She was born in Evansville, Indiana, and died in Los Angeles, California.

Author E. J. Fleming writing in his 2004 book, The Fixers: Eddie Mannix, Howard Strickling and the MGM Publicity Machine, states that when she ceased making films at the end of the silent era, she ran a high class bordello in an exclusive part of the Los Angeles area. Bennett's girls were made up to look like movie stars of the period, even undergoing surgical alterations to achieve the illusion. Much of the brothel was sponsored by MGM courting out of town clientele and foreign distributors and exhibitors from around the world.

== Selected filmography ==
- Almost a Rescue (1913)
- The House in the Tree (1913)
- Mabel's Busy Day (1914)
- The Masquerader (1914)
- Tillie's Punctured Romance (1914)
- Fatty's Chance Acquaintance (1915)
- Court House Crooks (1915)
- Hearts and Sparks (1916)
- Fighting Cressy (1919)
- The Courage of Marge O'Doone (1920)
- Crossing Trails (1921)
- Robin Hood (1922)
- The Eternal Three (1923)
- Blood Test (1923)
- Wanted by the Law (1924)
- The Martyr Sex (1924)
- The Wall Street Whiz (1925)
- Lady Windermere's Fan (1925)
- The Wyoming Wildcat (1925)
- Ranson's Folly (1926)
- Memory Lane (1926)
- The Amateur Gentleman (1926)
- The Claw (1927)
- Marriage (1927)
- The Slaver (1927)
- The Sonora Kid (1927)
- The Tragedy of Youth (1928)
- My Lady's Past (1929)
- One Romantic Night (1930)
