= The Wyoming Wildcat =

1925 film

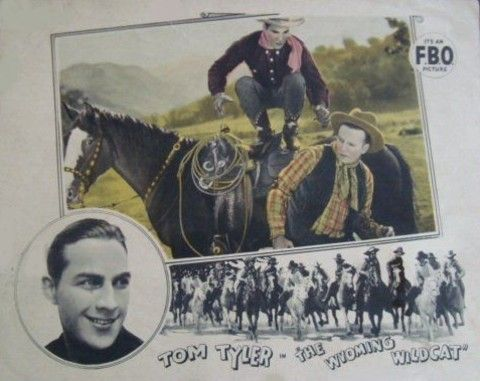
- Lobby card
- Directed by: Robert De Lacey
- Written by: Percy Heath
- Starring: Tom Tyler; Billie Bennett; Frankie Darro
- Cinematography: John W. Leezer
- Production company: Robertson-Cole Pictures Corporation
- Distributed by: Film Booking Offices of America
- Release date: November 1, 1925
- Running time: 50 minutes
- Country: United States
- Language: Silent (English intertitles)

The Wyoming Wildcat is a 1925 American silent Western film directed by Robert De Lacey and starring Tom Tyler, Billie Bennett, and Frankie Darro. A print exists in the Cinematek film archive.

== Plot ==
As described in a film magazine review, Phil Stone, a young cowboy, makes two enemies by rescuing a boy and his dog from an evil pair of ranchers, and, after he goes to work on a ranch owned by a Blendy Betts, the enemies begin operations. There follows a period of peril during which both hero and heroine nearly lose their lives. When Blendy is kidnapped and ends up in the river, Phil comes to her rescue. In the end, the desperate pair of scheming rangers are defeated and the young woman ranch owner and her employee are married.

== Cast ==
- Tom Tyler as Phil Stone
- Billie Bennett as Blendy Betts
- Gilbert Clayton as Jeff Kopp
- Ethan Laidlaw as Rudy Kopp
- Virginia Southern as Isabel Hastings
- Alfred Hewston as Dan Slade
- Frankie Darro as Barnie Finn
- Thomas Delmar as Cyclops

== Censorship ==
Before The Wyoming Wildcat could be exhibited in Kansas, the Kansas Board of Review required the elimination of all scenes except one where a man is whipping a boy.

== Bibliography ==
- Darby, William (1991). Masters of Lens and Light: A Checklist of Major Cinematographers and Their Feature Films. Scarecrow Press. ISBN 0-8108-2454-X
