= Idaho Red =

1929 film

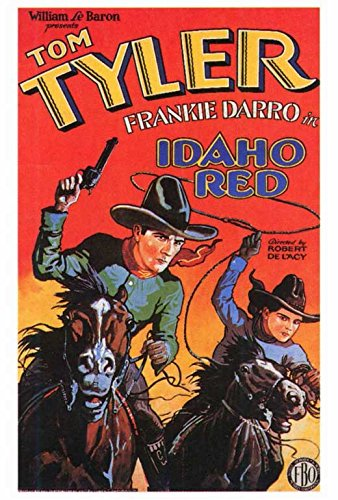
- Directed by: Robert De Lacey
- Written by: Frank Howard Clark; Helen Gregg
- Starring: Tom Tyler; Patricia Caron; Frankie Darro
- Cinematography: Nicholas Musuraca
- Production company: Film Booking Offices of America
- Distributed by: Film Booking Offices of America; Ideal Films (UK)
- Release date: April 21, 1929
- Running time: 50 minutes
- Country: United States
- Languages: Silent; English intertitles

Idaho Red is a 1929 American silent Western film directed by Robert De Lacey and starring Tom Tyler, Patricia Caron and Frankie Darro.

== Cast ==
- Tom Tyler as Andy Thornton
- Patricia Caron as Mary Regan
- Frankie Darro as Tadpole
- Barney Furey as Dave Lucas
- Lew Meehan as George Wilkins
