= The Drifter (1929 film) =

1929 film

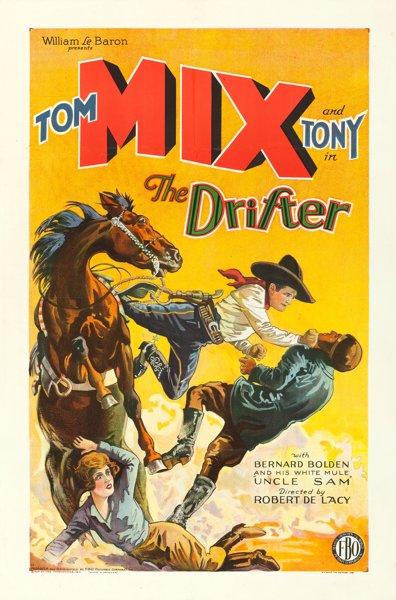
- Directed by: Robert De Lacey
- Written by: Oliver Drake; Robert De Lacey; George W. Pyper; Randolph Bartlett
- Starring: Tom Mix; Dorothy Dwan; Barney Furey
- Cinematography: Norman Devol
- Edited by: Ted Cheesman
- Production company: FBO
- Distributed by: FBO
- Release date: March 18, 1929
- Running time: 60 minutes
- Country: United States
- Languages: Silent; English intertitles

The Drifter is a 1929 American silent Western film directed by Robert De Lacey and starring Tom Mix, Dorothy Dwan and Barney Furey. It was one of the final films produced by FBO before the company was absorbed into the larger RKO Pictures. A complete copy of The Drifter exists.

== Cast ==
- Tom Mix as Tom McCall
- Dorothy Dwan as Ruth Martin
- Barney Furey as Happy Hogan
- Albert J. Smith as Pete Lawson
- Ernest Wilson as Uncle Abe
- Frank Austin as Seth Martin
- Joe Rickson as Hank
- Wynn Mace as Henchman

== Bibliography ==
- Jensen, Richard D. The Amazing Tom Mix: The Most Famous Cowboy of the Movies. 2005.
