= Frankie Darro =

American actor (1917–1976)

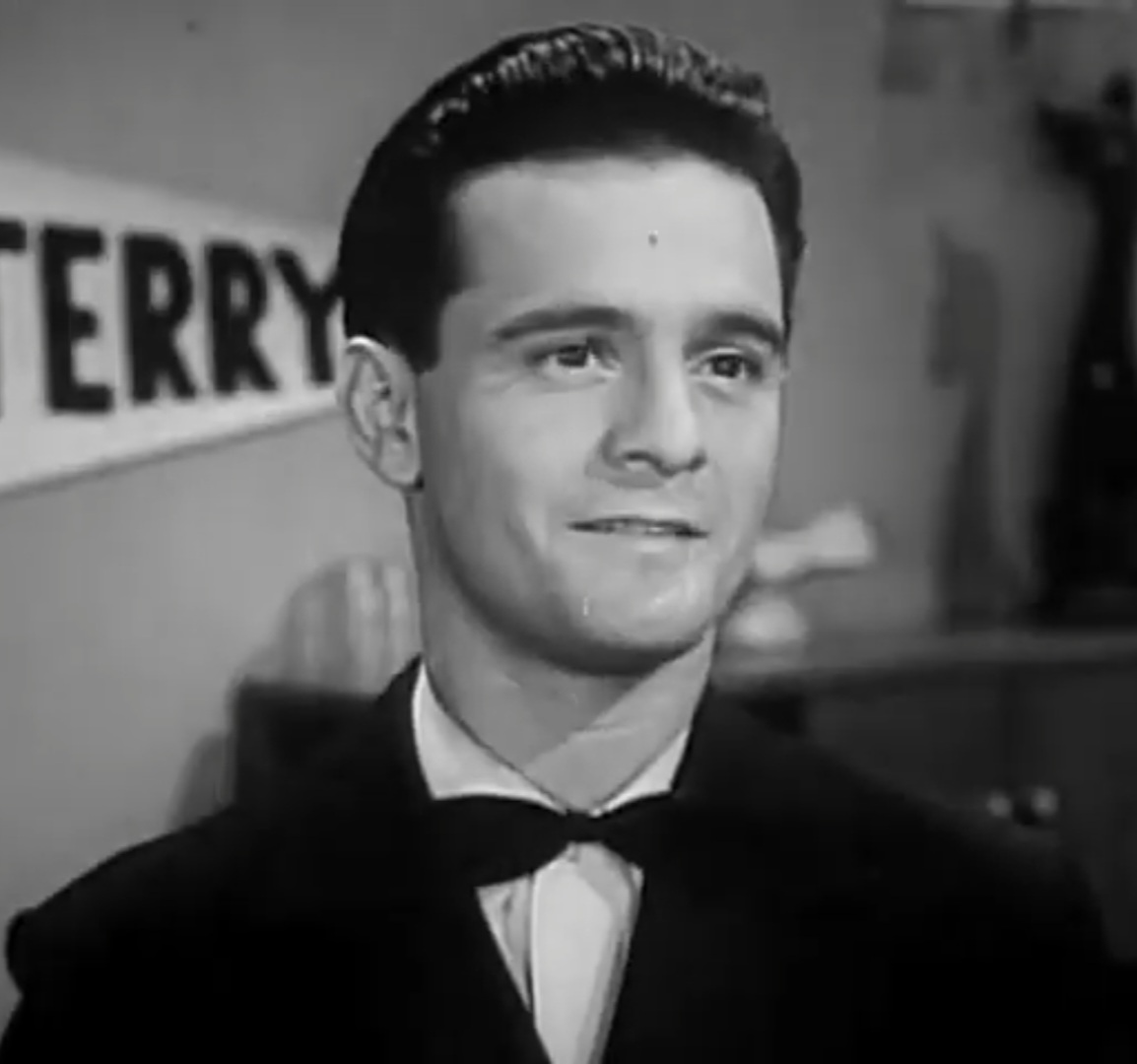
- Darro in Let's Go Collegiate (1941)
- Born: Frank Johnson Jr. December 22, 1917; Chicago, Illinois, U.S.
- Died: December 25, 1976 (aged 59)
- Other name: Frankie Darrow
- Occupations: Actor; stuntman
- Years active: 1924–1976
- Notable work: Voice of Romeo "Lampwick" in Disney's Pinocchio (1940); Eddie Smith in Wild Boys of the Road (1933)

Frankie Darro (born Frank Johnson Jr.; December 22, 1917 – December 25, 1976) was an American actor and later in his career a stuntman. He began his career as a child actor in silent films, progressed to lead roles and co-starring roles in adventure, western, dramatic, and comedy films, and later became a character actor and voice-over artist. He is perhaps best known for his role as Lampwick, the unlucky boy who turns into a donkey in Walt Disney's animated feature Pinocchio (1940). In early credits, his last name was spelled Darrow.

== Early life ==
Frankie Darro was born on Saturday, December 22, 1917 in Chicago, Illinois as Frank Johnson Jr. His parents, Frank Johnson, Sr. and his wife Ada, were known as The Flying Johnsons, and they had been working for the Cook Shows organization: "The Flying Johnsons have signed with the Cook Shows for the summer season to do their ceiling walking and double ring act." After the baby was born, the Johnsons toured with the Sells Floto Circus, doing an acrobatics and tightrope walking act. Frankie's father trained him in the profession, and he cured Frankie's fear of heights by having him walk on a length of tightrope wire, gradually raising the height of it until his son had mastered the trick.

In 1922, while the circus was in California, his parents divorced, and their circus act ended along with their marriage. The growing film industry, however, found a use for a small child who could do his own stunts. The young Johnson, renamed Frankie Darro (evidently in reference to the child's daring), appeared in his first film at age 6.

== Acting career ==
As a child actor, he appeared in many silent adventure, western, and serial pictures of the 1920s. He received good notices for his dramatic ability: "Little Frankie Darro is one of the cleverest child actors on the screen, and he has quite a part in The Signal Tower."

In 1931, Darro was featured in director William A. Wellman's success The Public Enemy. This role led to frequent assignments at Warner Bros., including Mervyn LeRoy's Three on a Match (1932) and The Mayor of Hell (1933), in which he was the principal character. Director Wellman cast him as the lead in Darro's most important role during the 1930s, Wild Boys of the Road, an indictment of teens who were vagabonds across America during the Depression. From this point, Darro usually was cast as a pint-sized tough guy, but he played wholesome leads in mysteries and comedies.

Frankie Darro was arguably the best juvenile actor in Hollywood, as reflected by his constant employment in the 1930s. Producer Nat Levine of Mascot Pictures valued him: he starred in six adventure serials from 1931 to 1935, with his salary increasing with his popularity: he earned $1,000 per week for The Vanishing Legion, $2,000 per week for The Lightning Warrior, $3,000 per week for The Devil Horse, $4,000 for The Wolf Dog, and $5,000 per week for Burn 'Em Up Barnes. Darro was reunited with western star Harry Carey in two of the serials; Carey and Darro had worked together in silent features. Darro might have continued as a serial star, but Levine's Mascot studio was bought by Herbert J. Yates, who created Mascot's successor Republic Pictures. The cost-conscious Yates opted not to meet Darro's established salary. Darro signed instead with producer Maurice Conn of Ambassador Pictures, where he starred in a series of modestly budgeted action features through 1937.

Darro stood only 5'3", limiting his potential as a leading man. His wiry, athletic frame and relatively short stature often typecast him as a jockey, in such films as The Ex-Mrs. Bradford, Charlie Chan at the Race Track, and A Day at the Races. With the play and film Dead End creating a vogue for "tough street kids" stories, Darro signed with Columbia Pictures for two action features: Reformatory and Juvenile Court. He also played a sympathetic role in Columbia's popular serial The Great Adventures of Wild Bill Hickok.

In 1938, Darro joined Monogram Pictures to star in a series of action melodramas. Darro's flair for comedy gradually increased the laugh content in these films. By 1940, Monogram hired Mantan Moreland to play his sidekick. The Frankie Darro series was so successful that Monogram used it as a haven for performers whose series had been discontinued: Jackie Moran, Marcia Mae Jones, and Keye Luke joined Darro and Moreland in 1940, and Gale Storm was added in 1941.

Darro served in the US Navy Hospital Corps during World War II. He contracted malaria while enlisted. Upon his return to civilian life, Monogram welcomed him back and cast the perennially youthful Darro in its The Teen Agers campus comedies. When that series ended, the studio gave Darro four featured roles in its popular Bowery Boys comedies, including a co-starring role in Fighting Fools (1949). It was the last film in which he played a lead; thereafter he accepted smaller roles and did stunt work for other actors in various films. Darro's last assignment for Monogram was as a stuntman, doubling for Leo Gorcey in Blues Busters in 1950.

== Later life ==
Darro's recurring malaria symptoms caused him to increase his alcohol intake for pain management, and his drinking affected his career. As film and TV roles became fewer, Darro opened his own tavern on Santa Monica Boulevard, naming it Try Later after the response he most often received when he asked Central Casting for work. Because of his drinking, he had become too risky for producers to hire by the mid-1950s.

Frankie Darro is probably best known to modern audiences for two films in which he isn't even seen: Walt Disney's Pinocchio (1940, as the voice of Lampwick), and Forbidden Planet (1956, as one of the actor/operators inside the 7-foot-tall "Robby the Robot"). He was fired shortly after an early scene because of his having consumed a five-martini lunch before the scene was shot; he nearly fell over while attempting to walk while inside the expensive prop.

Darro's last featured appearance in a movie was in Operation Petticoat (1959). He played small parts well into the 1960s, mostly on television: The Red Skelton Show, Bat Masterson, Have Gun — Will Travel, The Untouchables, Alfred Hitchcock Presents, The Addams Family, and Batman (episodes 9 and 10). He also did voice-over work for various projects.

== Selected filmography ==
- Judgment of the Storm (1924) as Heath Twin
- Half-A-Dollar-Bill (1924) as Half-A-Dollar-Bill
- The Signal Tower (1924) as Sonny Taylor
- Racing for Life (1924) as Jimmy Danton
- Roaring Rails (1924) as Little Bill
- So Big (1924) as Dirk DeJong (child)
- Women and Gold (1925) as Dan Barclay Jr.
- The Fearless Lover (1925) as Frankie
- Her Husband's Secret (1925) as Young Elliot Owen
- Confessions of a Queen (1925) as Prince Zara
- Fighting the Flames (1925) as Mickey
- Let's Go, Gallagher (1925) as Little Joey
- Wandering Footsteps (1925) as Billy
- The Wyoming Wildcat (1925) as Barnie Finn
- The People vs. Nancy Preston (1925) as Bubsy
- The Phantom Express (1925) as Daddles' Lane, Nora's Brother
- The Midnight Flyer (1925) as Young Davey
- The Cowboy Musketeer (1925) as Billy Gordon
- Mike (1926) as Boy
- Born to Battle (1926) as Birdie
- The Thrill Hunter (1926) as Boy Prince
- Memory Lane (1926) as Urchin
- The Arizona Streak (1926) as Mike
- Kiki (1926) as Pierre
- Wild to Go (1926) as Frankie Blake
- The Masquerade Bandit (1926) as Tim Marble
- Hearts and Spangles (1926) as Bobby
- The Cowboy Cop (1926) as Frankie
- The Carnival Girl (1926) as Her Brother
- Tom and His Pals (1926) as Frankie Smith
- Out of the West (1926) as Frankie O'Connor
- Red Hot Hoofs (1926) as Frankie Buckley
- Flesh and the Devil (1926) as Boy Who Dances with Hertha (uncredited)
- Her Father Said No (1927) as Matt Doe
- Enemies of Society (1927) as Sandy Barry
- Long Pants (1927) as Young Harry Shelby (uncredited)
- Cyclone of the Range (1927) as Frankie Butler
- Tom's Gang (1927) as Spuds
- Lightning Lariats (1927) as King Alexis
- Judgment of the Hills (1927) as Tad Dennison
- The Flying U Ranch (1927) as Chip Jr.
- The Desert Pirate (1927) as Jimmy Rand
- Little Mickey Grogan (1927) as Mickey Grogan
- The Texas Tornado (1928) as Buddy Martin
- When the Law Rides (1928) as Frankie Ross
- Phantom of the Range (1928) as Spuds O'Brien
- Terror Mountain (1928) as Buddy Roberts
- The Circus Kid (1928) as Buddy
- The Avenging Rider (1928) as Frankie Sheridan
- Tyrant of Red Gulch (1928) as Tip
- Trail of the Horse Thieves (1929) as Buddy
- Gun Law (1929) as Buster Brown
- Idaho Red (1929) as Tadpole
- The Rainbow Man (1929) as Billy Ryan (first sound film)
- The Pride of Pawnee (1929) as Jerry Wilson
- Blaze o' Glory (1929) as Jean Williams
- The Public Enemy (1931) as the young Matt Doyle (uncredited)
- The Vanishing Legion (1931, serial) as Jimmie Williams
- The Sin of Madelon Claudet (1931) as Larry Claudet, as a boy (uncredited)
- The Lightning Warrior (1931, serial) as Jimmy Carter
- The Mad Genius (1931) as the young Fedor Ivanoff
- Way Back Home (1931) as Robbie
- The Cheyenne Cyclone (1931) as "Orphan" McGuire
- Amateur Daddy (1932) as Pete Smith
- Three on a Match (1932) as Bobby
- The Devil Horse (1932, serial) as Frankie Graham, the Wild Boy
- The Mayor of Hell (1933) as Jimmy Smith
- Laughing at Life (1933) as Chango
- Tugboat Annie (1933) as Alec, as a Child
- Wild Boys of the Road (1933) as Eddie Smith
- The Wolf Dog (1933, serial) as Frank Courtney
- The Big Race (1934) as Knobby
- No Greater Glory (1934) as Feri Ats
- The Merry Frinks (1934) as Norman Frink
- Burn 'Em Up Barnes (1934, serial) as Bobbie Riley
- Broadway Bill (1934) as Ted Williams
- Little Men (1934) as Dan
- Red Hot Tires (1935) as Johnny
- The Phantom Empire (1935, serial) as Frankie Baxter
- The Unwelcome Stranger (1935) as Charlie Anderson
- Stranded (1935) as Jimmy Rivers
- Men of Action (1935) as Johnny Morgan
- Valley of Wanted Men (1935) as Slivers Sanderson
- Three Kids and a Queen (1935) as Blackie
- The Payoff (1935) as Jimmy Moore
- Black Gold (1936) as Clifford "Fishtail" O'Reilly
- The Ex-Mrs. Bradford (1936) as Spike Salisbury (uncredited)
- Charlie Chan at the Race Track (1936) as Tip Collins, jockey
- Born to Fight (1936) as Baby Face Madison
- Racing Blood (1936) as Frankie Reynolds
- Mind Your Own Business (1936) as Bob
- Headline Crasher (1936) as Jimmy Tallant
- Robin Hood, Jr. (1936)
- The Devil Diamond (1937) as Lee, aka Kid Harris
- Tough to Handle (1937) as Mike Sanford
- A Day at the Races (1937) as Morgan's Jockey (uncredited)
- Anything for a Thrill (1937) as Dan Mallory
- Saratoga (1937) as Dixie Gordon
- Thoroughbreds Don't Cry (1937) as Dink Reid
- Young Dynamite (1937) as Freddie Shields
- Reformatory (1938) as Louie Miller
- The Great Adventures of Wild Bill Hickok (1938, serial) as Jerry, aka Little Brave Heart
- Juvenile Court (1938) as Stubby
- Wanted by the Police (1938) as Danny Murphy
- Tough Kid (1938) as Skipper Murphy
- Boys' Reformatory (1939) as Tommy Ryan
- Irish Luck (1939) (1st film with Mantan Moreland) as Buzzy O'Brien
- Chasing Trouble (1940) (with Mantan Moreland) as Frankie "Cupid" O'Brien
- Pinocchio (1940) as Lampwick (voice, uncredited)
- On the Spot (1940) (with Mantan Moreland) as Frankie Kelly
- Laughing at Danger (1940) (with Mantan Moreland) as Frankie Kelly
- Up in the Air (1940) (with Mantan Moreland) as Frankie Ryan
- You're Out of Luck (1941) (with Mantan Moreland) as Frankie O'Reilly
- The Gang's All Here (1941) (with Mantan Moreland) as Frankie O'Malley
- Let's Go Collegiate (1941) (with Mantan Moreland) as Frankie Monahan
- Tuxedo Junction (1941) as Jack "Sock" Anderson
- Junior G-Men of the Air (1942, serial) as Jack (last before joining the US Navy)
- Take It or Leave It (1944) as Radio Listener
- Junior Prom (1946) as Roy Donne (first after World War II and first of the Teen Agers series)
- Freddie Steps Out (1946) as Roy Donne
- Chick Carter, Detective (1946, serial) as Creeper (uncredited)
- High School Hero (1946) as Roy Donne
- Sarge Goes to College (1947) as Roy Donne
- That's My Man (1947) as Jockey
- Smart Politics (1948) as Roy Donne
- Angels' Alley (1948) as Jimmy
- Heart of Virginia (1948) as Jimmy Easter
- The Babe Ruth Story (1948) as Newsboy (uncredited)
- Trouble Makers (1948) as Ben Feathers
- Fighting Fools (1949) as Johnny Higgins (last leading role)
- Hold That Baby! (1949) as Bananas Stewart
- Sons of New Mexico (1949) as Gig Jackson
- Riding High (1950) as Jockey Williams
- The Next Voice You Hear... (1950) as Newsboy (uncredited)
- A Life of Her Own (1950) as Bellboy (uncredited)
- Wyoming Mail (1950) as Rufe
- The Red Skelton Show (1951, TV Series) as the Little Old Lady
- Pride of Maryland (1951) as Steve Loomis
- Across the Wide Missouri (1951) as Cadet (uncredited)
- Westward the Women (1951) as Jean's Awaiting Groom (uncredited)
- The Sellout (1952) as Little Jake (uncredited)
- Pat and Mike (1952) as Caddy (uncredited)
- Siren of Bagdad (1953) as Man in Camp after Raid (uncredited)
- Racing Blood (1954) as Ben, a jockey
- The Lawless Rider (1954) as Jim Bascom
- Living It Up (1954) as Bellboy Captain (uncredited)
- Forbidden Planet (1956) as Robby the Robot (uncredited)
- The Ten Commandments (1956) as Slave (uncredited)
- Peter Gunn (1958, Season 1 Episode 13: "The Jockey") as Billy Arnet
- The Perfect Furlough (1958) as Soldier in Hospital in Cast (uncredited)
- Operation Petticoat (1959) as Pharmacists Mate 3rd Class Dooley, USN
- The Untouchables (1960, TV series) as News Vendor
- Alfred Hitchcock Presents (1960, Season 5 Episode 31: "I Can Take Care of Myself") as Little Dandy Dorf
- Alfred Hitchcock Presents (1962, Season 7 Episode 26: "Ten O'Clock Tiger") as Boots Murphy
- The Carpetbaggers (1964) as Bellhop (uncredited)
- The Disorderly Orderly (1964) as Board Member (uncredited)
- Batman (1966, TV series) as Newsman
- Fugitive Lovers (1975) as Lester, the town drunk
