= When the Law Rides =

1928 film

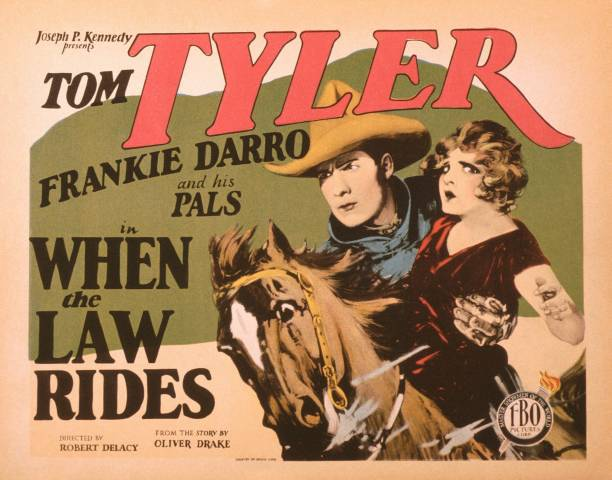
- Directed by: Robert De Lacey
- Written by: Oliver Drake; Randolph Bartlett
- Starring: Tom Tyler; Jane Reid; Frankie Darro
- Cinematography: Nicholas Musuraca
- Production company: Film Booking Offices of America
- Distributed by: Film Booking Offices of America; Ideal Films (UK)
- Release date: February 26, 1928
- Running time: 50 minutes
- Country: United States
- Languages: Silent; English intertitles

When the Law Rides is a 1928 American silent Western film directed by Robert De Lacey and starring Tom Tyler, Jane Reid and Frankie Darro.

== Cast ==
- Tom Tyler as Tom O'Malley
- Jane Reid as Becky Ross
- Frankie Darro as Frankie Ross
- Harry O'Connor as Henry Blaine
- Harry Woods as The Raven
- Charles Thurston as Joshua Ross
- Bill Nestell as Snake Arnold
- Barney Furey as The Little Man

== Bibliography ==
- Langman, Larry. A Guide to Silent Westerns. Greenwood Publishing Group, 1992.
