= The Lightning Rider =

1924 film

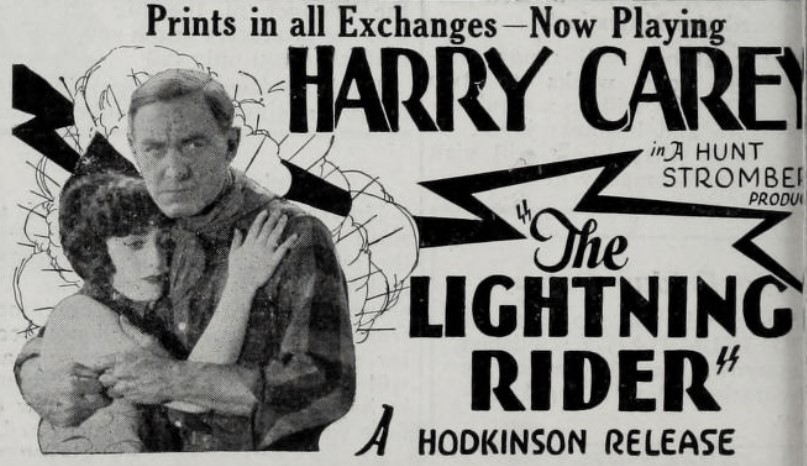
- Advertisement
- Directed by: Lloyd Ingraham
- Written by: Walter Anthony; Doris Dorn; Shannon Fife
- Produced by: Hunt Stromberg
- Starring: Harry Carey
- Cinematography: Sol Polito
- Edited by: Laurence Creutz
- Distributed by: W. W. Hodkinson Corporation
- Release date: May 18, 1924
- Running time: 6 reels
- Country: United States
- Languages: Silent; English intertitles

The Lightning Rider is a 1924 American silent Western film directed by Lloyd Ingraham and featuring Harry Carey. Prints of The Lightning Rider are held in the collections of the Museum of Modern Art in New York City and Cinémathèque française in Paris.

== Plot ==
The bandit Ramon Gonzales, operating as "the Black Mask," begins terrorizing the town of Caliboro, California, near the Mexico–United States border. After the local parish priest entrusts Sheriff Alvarez with church money, the Black Mask steals it, kills Alvarez, and frames Deputy Sheriff Philip Morgan. Morgan tries to catch the real villain with a plan that involves disguising himself as the Black Mask, but he is discovered and nearly lynched. Morgan is saved when Gonzalez's girlfriend Claire Grayson betrays him, and once freed Morgan successfully proposes to Alvarez's daughter Patricia.

== Cast ==
- Harry Carey as Phlip Morgan
- Virginia Brown Faire as Patricia Alvarez
- Thomas G. Lingham as Sheriff Alvarez
- Frances Ross as Claire Grayson
- Léon Bary as Rammon Gonzales (credited as Leon Barry)
- Bert Hadley as Manuel
- Madame Sul-Te-Wan as Mammy

== Production ==
The Lightning Rider, originally titled Desert Rose, was completed as the third film in Carey's contract for six Western films produced by Hunt Stromberg. It was shot primarily at the Charles Ray Studio in Los Angeles. Stromberg sought to make the film as a psychological thriller rather than an action film as Western films were predominantly made.

== See also ==
- Harry Carey filmography
