= The Sonora Kid (film) =

1927 film

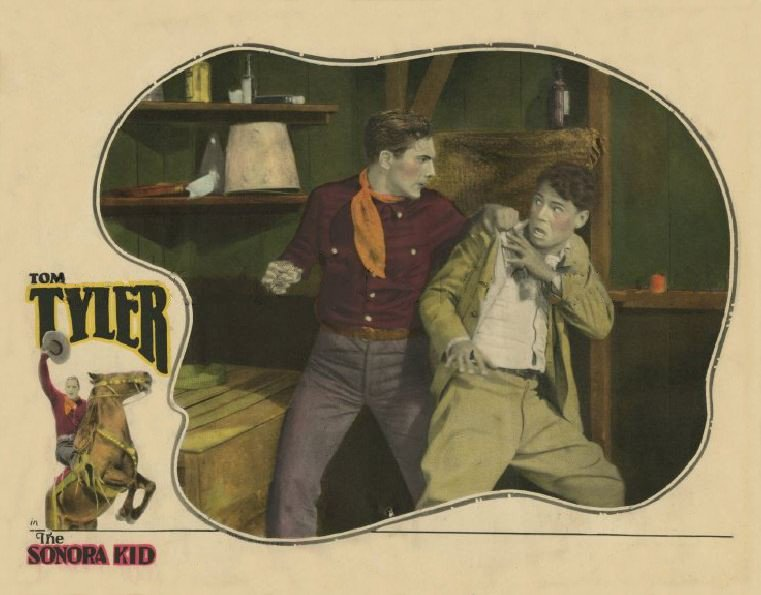
- Directed by: Robert De Lacey
- Written by: J.G. Hawks; Percy Heath
- Produced by: Joseph P. Kennedy
- Starring: Tom Tyler; Peggy Montgomery; Billie Bennett
- Cinematography: Nicholas Musuraca
- Production company: Robertson-Cole Pictures Corporation
- Distributed by: Film Booking Offices of America
- Release date: March 13, 1927
- Running time: 50 minutes
- Country: United States
- Languages: Silent; English intertitles

The Sonora Kid is a 1927 American silent Western film directed by Robert De Lacey and starring Tom Tyler, Peggy Montgomery and Billie Bennett.

== Cast ==
- Tom Tyler as Tom MacReady
- Peggy Montgomery as Phyllis Butterworth
- Billie Bennett as Aunt Marie
- Mark Hamilton as Chuck Saunders
- Jack Richardson as Arthur Butterworth
- Ethan Laidlaw as Tough Ryder
- Bruce Gordon as James Poindexter
- Barney Furey as Doc Knight
- Victor Allen as Sheriff

== Bibliography ==
- Munden, Kenneth White. The American Film Institute Catalog of Motion Pictures Produced in the United States, Part 1. University of California Press, 1997.
