= The Love Transcendent =

1915 film

- Starring: Harry Carey
- Release date: March 25, 1915
- Country: United States
- Language: Silent with English intertitles

The Love Transcendent is a 1915 American drama film featuring Harry Carey.

== Cast ==
- Eleanor Blevins
- Harry Carey as The Prospector
- Barney Furey
- Charles West (credited as Charles H. West)

== See also ==
- Harry Carey filmography
