= The House in the Tree =

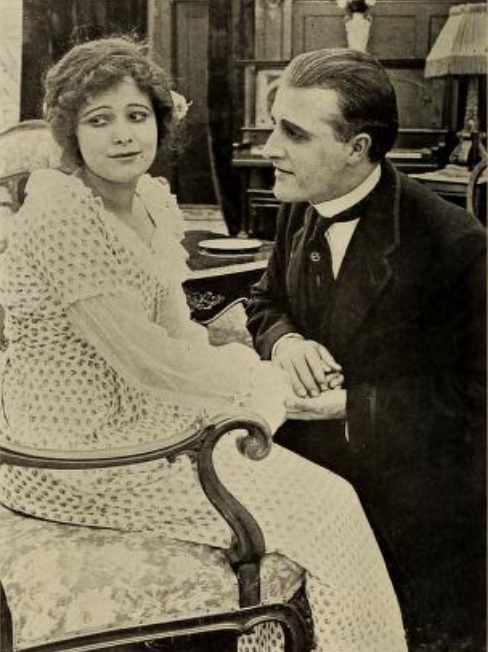
- Billie West and William Garwood in The House in the Tree (1913)
- Written by: Lloyd Lonergan
- Starring: William Garwood; Billie Bennett
- Distributed by: Mutual Film
- Release date: November 23, 1913
- Country: United States
- Languages: Silent film English intertitles

The House in the Tree is a 1913 American silent short film written by Lloyd Lonergan starring William Garwood and Billie Bennett. The plot involves childhood sweethearts May and Jack, who reunite in adulthood.

== Cast ==
- Josie Ashdown
- Victory Bateman
- Billie Bennett
- Howard Davies
- William Garwood
- Dimitri Mitsoras
- Muriel Ostriche
- Vera Sisson
- Billie West
