= A Day's Adventure =

1915 film

- Starring: Harry Carey
- Release date: May 8, 1915
- Country: United States
- Language: Silent with English intertitles

A Day's Adventure is a 1915 American drama film featuring Harry Carey.

== Cast ==
- Harry Carey as Hogan, Leader of The Crooks
- Barney Furey (credited as J. Barney Furey)
- Claire McDowell
- Charles West (credited as Charles H. West)

== See also ==
- List of American films of 1915
- Harry Carey filmography
