= Splitting the Breeze =

1927 film

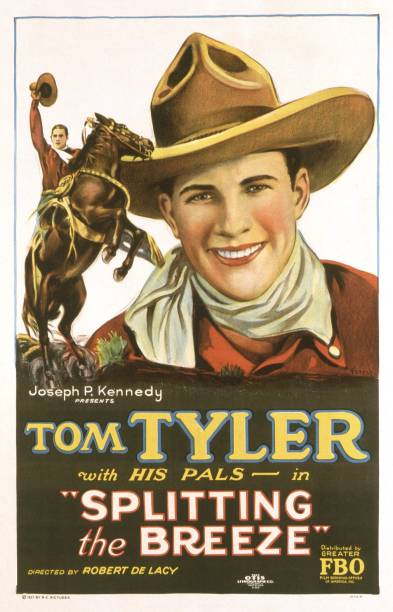
- Directed by: Robert De Lacey
- Written by: Frank Howard Clark
- Produced by: Joseph P. Kennedy
- Starring: Tom Tyler; Harry Woods; Peggy Montgomery
- Cinematography: Nicholas Musuraca
- Production company: Robertson-Cole Pictures Corporation
- Distributed by: Film Booking Offices of America
- Release date: May 29, 1927
- Running time: 50 minutes
- Country: United States
- Languages: Silent; English intertitles

Splitting the Breeze is a 1927 American silent Western film directed by Robert De Lacey and starring Tom Tyler, Harry Woods and Peggy Montgomery.

== Cast ==
- Tom Tyler as Death Valley Drake
- Harry Woods as Dave Matlock
- Barney Furey as Reverend Otis Briggs
- Thomas G. Lingham as Tom Rand
- Peggy Montgomery as Janet Rand
- Buzz Barton as Red
- Alfred Hewston as Hank Robbins
- Barbara Starr as Lois Cortez

== Production ==
Exteriors for Splitting the Breeze were shot on location at Lone Pine, California.

== Bibliography ==
- Munden, Kenneth White. The American Film Institute Catalog of Motion Pictures Produced in the United States, Part 1. University of California Press, 1997.
