= The Gambler's I.O.U. =

1915 film

- Starring: Harry Carey
- Release date: April 12, 1915
- Country: United States
- Language: Silent with English intertitles

The Gambler's I.O.U. is a 1915 American drama film featuring Harry Carey.

== Cast ==
- Harry Carey as Dave Dawson
- Barney Furey
- Claire McDowell
- Charles West (credited as Charles H. West)

== See also ==
- Harry Carey filmography
