= Tom's Gang =

1927 film

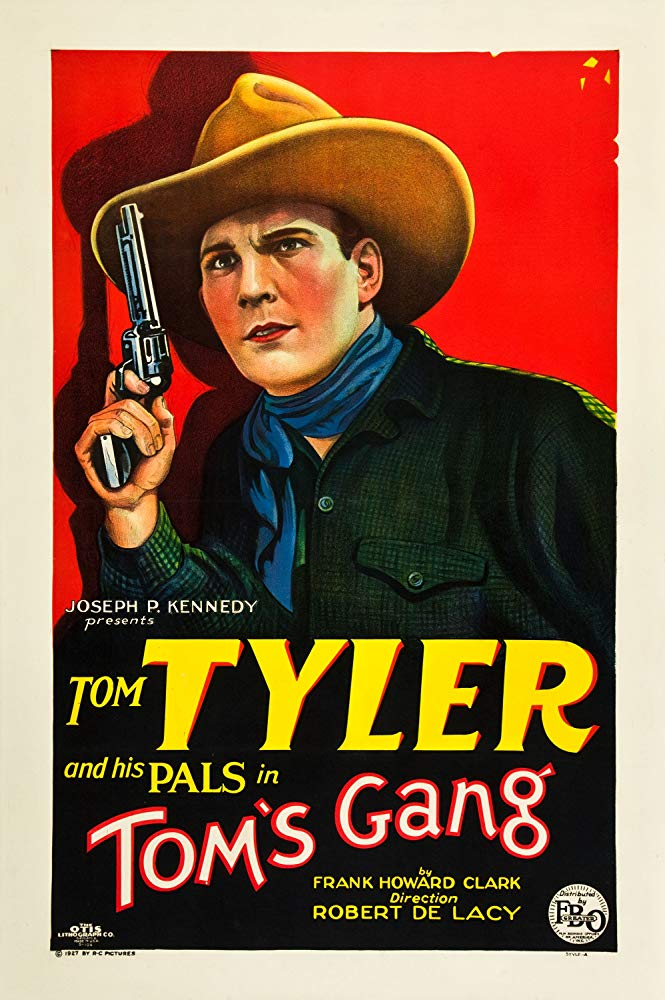
- Directed by: Robert De Lacey
- Written by: Frank Howard Clark
- Produced by: Joseph P. Kennedy
- Starring: Tom Tyler; Sharon Lynn; Frankie Darro
- Cinematography: Nicholas Musuraca
- Production company: Robertson-Cole Pictures Corporation
- Distributed by: Film Booking Offices of America
- Release date: July 10, 1927
- Running time: 50 minutes
- Country: United States
- Languages: Silent; English intertitles

Tom's Gang is a 1927 American silent Western film directed by Robert De Lacey and starring Tom Tyler, Sharon Lynn and Frankie Darro.

== Cast ==
- Tom Tyler as Dave Collins
- Sharon Lynn as Lucille Rogers
- Frankie Darro as Spuds
- Harry Woods as Bart Haywood
- Frank Rice as Andy Barker
- Barney Furey as Ray Foster
- Thomas G. Lingham as George Daggett
- Jack Anthony as Bill Grimshaw

== Bibliography ==
- Langman, Larry. A Guide to Silent Westerns. Greenwood Publishing Group, 1992.
