= The Cherokee Kid (1927 film) =

1927 film

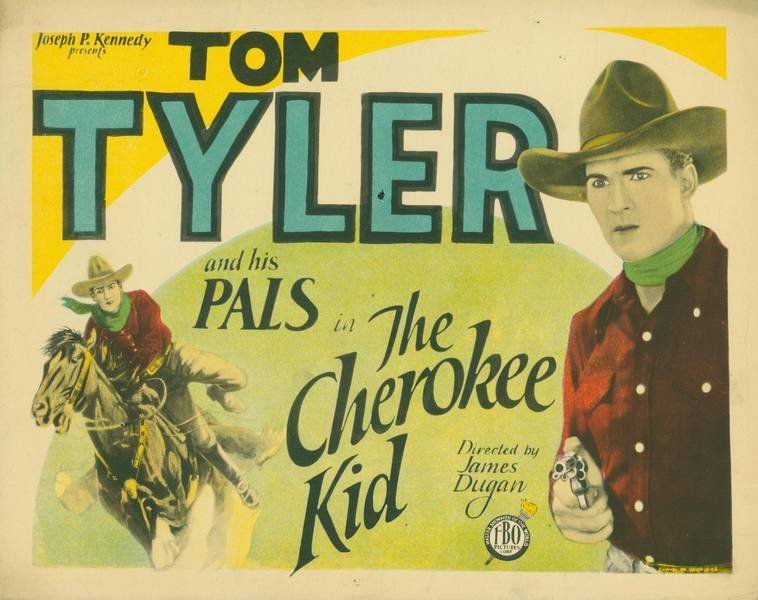
- Directed by: Robert De Lacey
- Written by: Joseph Kane; Oliver Drake
- Produced by: Joseph P. Kennedy
- Starring: Tom Tyler; Sharon Lynn; Jerry Pembroke
- Cinematography: Nicholas Musuraca
- Production company: Film Booking Offices of America
- Distributed by: Film Booking Offices of America; Ideal Films (UK)
- Release date: October 30, 1927
- Running time: 50 minutes
- Country: United States
- Languages: Silent; English intertitles

The Cherokee Kid is a 1927 American silent Western film directed by Robert De Lacey and starring Tom Tyler, Sharon Lynn and Jerry Pembroke.

== Cast ==
- Tom Tyler as Bill Duncan
- Sharon Lynn as Helen Flynne
- Jerry Pembroke as Rolphe McPherson
- Bob Burns as Sheriff
- Bob Reeves as Seth Daggart
- Ray Childs as Joe Gault
- James Van Horn as Red Flynne
- Carol Holloway as Rose

== Preservation ==
With no holdings located in archives, The Cherokee Kid is considered a lost film.
