= The Midnight Girl =

1925 film

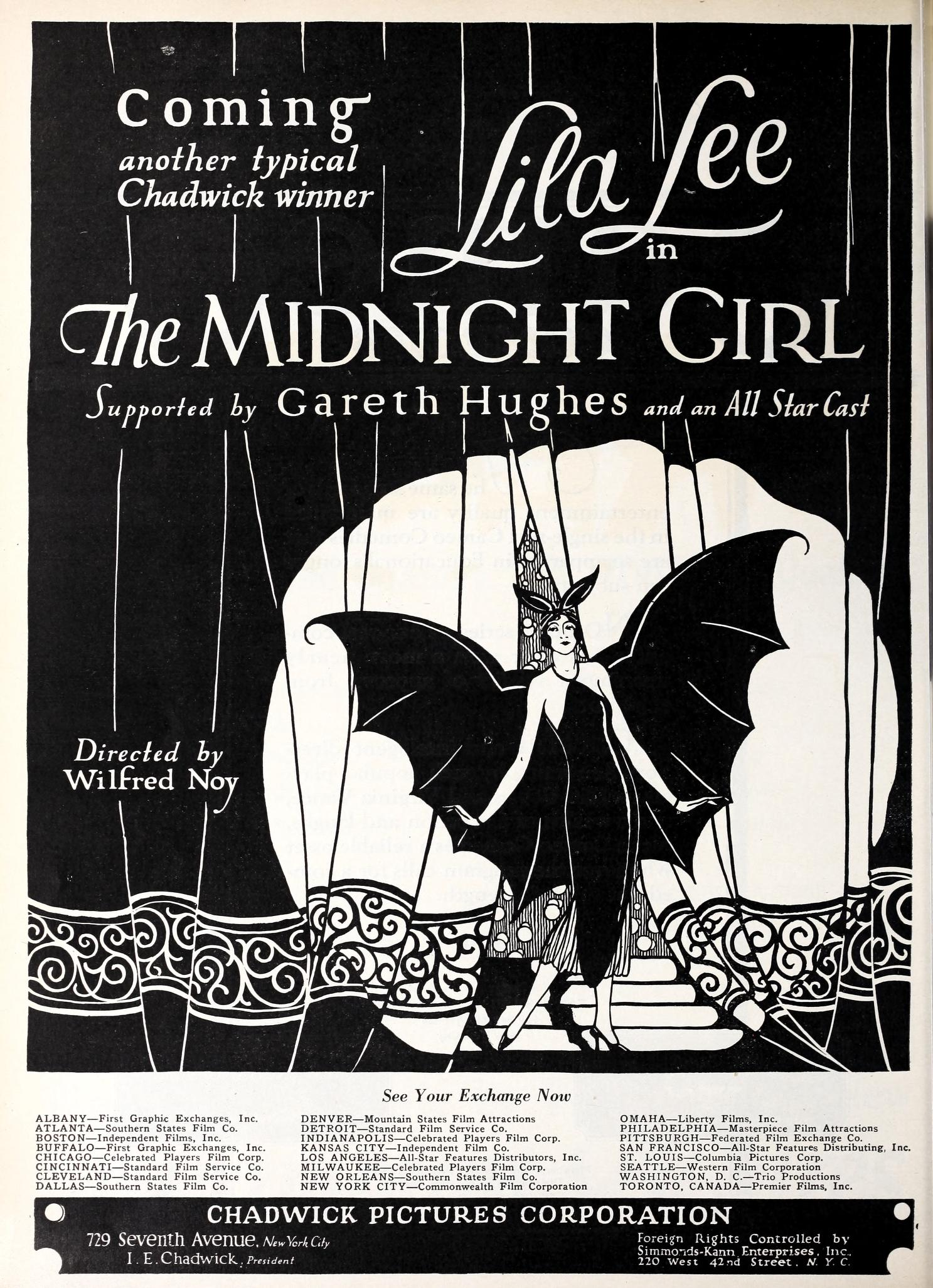
- Advertisement
- Directed by: Wilfred Noy
- Written by: Jean Conover; Wilfred Noy
- Based on: "The Midnight Girl" by Garrett Fort
- Produced by: I.E. Chadwick
- Starring: Lila Lee; Gareth Hughes; Béla Lugosi
- Cinematography: G. W. Bitzer; Frank Zucker
- Edited by: Paul F. Maschke
- Production company: Chadwick Pictures
- Distributed by: Chadwick Pictures
- Release date: February 15, 1925
- Running time: 84 minutes
- Country: United States
- Language: Silent (English intertitles)

The Midnight Girl is a 1925 American drama film directed by Wilfred Noy and starring Lila Lee and featuring Bela Lugosi.

== Plot ==
The film

Lugosi plays, according to an intertitle, "Nicholas Harmon, the immensely wealthy patron of music" who "loved his weaknesses — and his favorite weakness was Nina," his mistress, an opera singer whose voice is faltering. His stepson Don, an orchestra conductor, rejects the attentions of a society girl. Don becomes estranged from his stepfather in an argument, and leaves to succeed on his own. He helps the career of Anna, a newly arrived singer from Russia who becomes a nightclub star, the "Midnight Girl". Harmon sees her perform, and is entranced. He invites her to his apartment, where his attempts to seduce her become forceful. Anna fires a gun at him, but hits instead Nina, who has been hiding behind a curtain. Harmon realizes how much he loves Nina, and cradles her in his arms. At the end of the story, Don has married Anna, who is now a leading opera singer, and Harmon has married Nina.

== Cast ==
- Lila Lee as Anna Meridoff
- Gareth Hughes as Don Harmon
- Béla Lugosi as Nicholas Harmon
- Dolores Cassinelli as Nina
- Charlotte Walker as Mrs. Schuyler
- Ruby Blaine as Natalie Schuyler
- John D. Walsh as Victor Delski
- William Harvey as Nifty Louis
- Sidney Paxton as Joe Green
- Signor N. Salerno as Manager
- Flora Finch as Landlady

== Production ==
The film was adapted from a story by Garrett Fort, who would later co-write the screenplay for Lugosi's Dracula. It was filmed in early 1925 at the Astoria Studios, on Long Island, New York.

In 1926, opera singer Nina Morgana sued Chadwick Pictures over The Midnight Girl, claiming that the opera singer character named "Nina" is portrayed as "debauched" and "passe", and thus was damaging to Morgana's reputation.

== Preservation ==
A print of the film survives.

Following a successful Kickstarter campaign, the film was restored in 2K and released on DVD and Blu-Ray.

== See also ==
- Béla Lugosi filmography
