= Red Riders of Canada =

1928 film

- Directed by: Robert De Lacey
- Written by: William Byron Mowery; Oliver Drake; Randolph Bartlett
- Produced by: Joseph P. Kennedy; Robert N. Bradbury
- Starring: Patsy Ruth Miller; Rex Lease; Harry Woods
- Cinematography: Nicholas Musuraca
- Production company: Film Booking Offices of America
- Distributed by: Film Booking Offices of America; Ideal Films (UK)
- Release date: April 4, 1928
- Running time: 70 minutes
- Country: United States
- Languages: Silent; English intertitles

Red Riders of Canada is a 1928 American silent Western film directed by Robert De Lacey and starring Patsy Ruth Miller, Rex Lease and Harry Woods.

== Cast ==
- Patsy Ruth Miller as Joan Duval
- Charles Byer as RCMP Sergeant Brian Scott
- Harry Woods as Monsieur Le Busard
- Rex Lease as Pierre Duval
- Barney Furey as Nicholas

== Bibliography ==
- Munden, Kenneth White. The American Film Institute Catalog of Motion Pictures Produced in the United States, Part 1. University of California Press, 1997.
