= Robert De Lacey =

American film director in the silent era

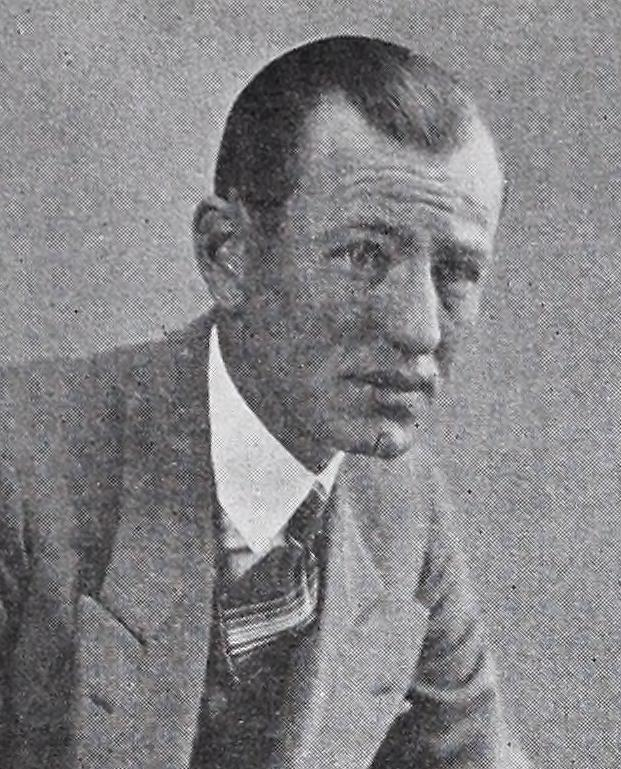
- De Lacey c. 1927
- Born: June 7, 1892; Illinois, United States
- Died: March 3, 1976 (aged 83); Los Angeles, California, United States
- Occupations: Director, Editor
- Years active: 1920-1930(film)

Robert De Lacey (1892–1976) was an American film director of the silent era. Working at the FBO studios, he specialized in making westerns.

== Selected filmography ==
=== Editor ===
- Held In Trust (1920)
- Boy of Mine (1923)
- Mighty Lak' a Rose (1923)
- The Girl of the Golden West (1923)
- A Son of the Sahara (1924)
- The Flaming Forties (1924)

=== Director ===
- Let's Go, Gallagher (1925)
- The Wyoming Wildcat (1925)
- The Cowboy Musketeer (1925)
- The Cowboy Cop (1926)
- The Arizona Streak (1926)
- Out of the West (1926)
- The Masquerade Bandit (1926)
- Born to Battle (1926)
- Red Hot Hoofs (1926)
- Tom and His Pals (1926)
- Wild to Go (1926)
- Tom's Gang (1927)
- Splitting the Breeze (1927)
- The Cherokee Kid (1927)
- The Sonora Kid (1927)
- The Flying U Ranch (1927)
- Lightning Lariats (1927)
- Red Riders of Canada (1928)
- Tyrant of Red Gulch (1928)
- When the Law Rides (1928)
- King Cowboy (1928)
- The Drifter (1929)
- Idaho Red (1929)
- The Pride of Pawnee (1929)
- Pardon My Gun (1930)

== Bibliography ==
- Munden, Kenneth White. The American Film Institute Catalog of Motion Pictures Produced in the United States, Part 1. University of California Press, 1997.
