= Little Pal (1915 film) =

1915 film by James Kirkwood

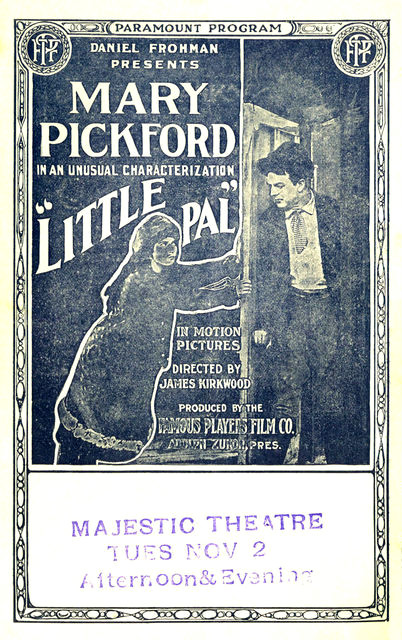
- Film poster
- Directed by: James Kirkwood
- Written by: Marshall Neilan
- Story by: Frances Marion
- Starring: Mary Pickford
- Cinematography: Emmett A. Williams
- Production company: Famous Players–Lasky
- Distributed by: Paramount Pictures
- Release date: July 1, 1915
- Running time: 5 reels
- Country: United States
- Language: Silent (English intertitles)

Little Pal is a 1915 American silent drama film directed by James Kirkwood and starring Mary Pickford. The film was produced by Famous Players Film Company and distributed by Paramount Pictures.

== Cast ==
- Mary Pickford as 'Little Pal'
- Russell Bassett as Sid Gerue
- George Anderson as John Grandon
- William Lloyd as 'Pill Box' Andy
- Constance Johnston as Frances Grandon
- Joseph Manning as 'Black Brand'
- Bert Hadley as Cultus

== Preservation status ==
A print is preserved at Cinémathèque française.
