= Nicholas Musuraca =

Italian cinematographer

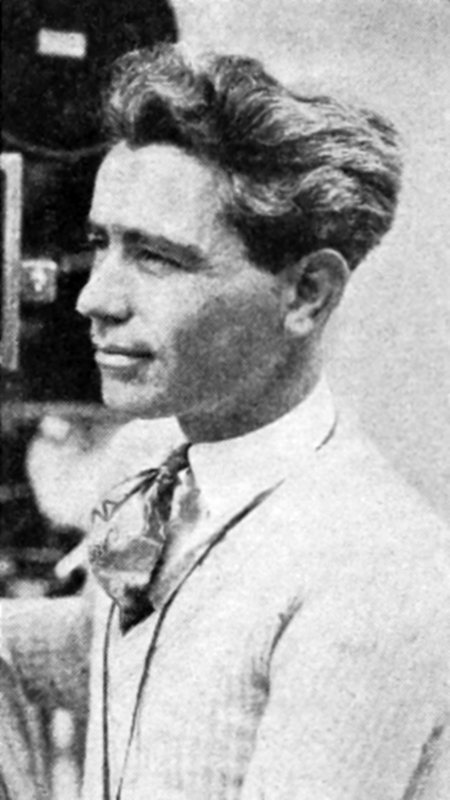
- Nick Musuraca in 1926
- Born: October 25, 1892; Riace, Italy
- Died: September 3, 1975 (aged 82); Los Angeles, California, U.S.
- Occupation: Cinematographer
- Years active: 1922–1966

Nicholas Musuraca, A.S.C. (October 25, 1892 – September 3, 1975) was a motion-picture cinematographer best remembered for his work at RKO Pictures in the 1940s, including many of Val Lewton's series of B-picture horror films.

== Biography ==
Born in 1892, Nicola Musuraca left his home in Riace, province of Reggio di Calabria, Italy, and emigrated to the United States in 1907. He and his father, Cosimo Musuraca, boarded the Italian steamer Re d'Italia in July 1907, sailing from Naples on July 18 and arriving at the Port of New York on August 3, 1907. There, they were transferred to Ellis Island with their fellow steerage passengers where they underwent federal immigrant inspection. Upon being admitted the father and son set out for Brooklyn to join Cosimo's brother, Francesco.

He began his film career as the chauffeur for silent film producer J. Stuart Blackton. He worked behind the scenes on numerous silent and B-movie action films before becoming one of RKO Radio Pictures prime directors of photography in the 1930s. His Stranger on the Third Floor (1940) is sometimes considered the first film-noir. While working regularly at RKO, he joined Val Lewton's unit making low-budget horror-films, being responsible for the cinematography of five of the films produced by Lewton's unit. Musuraca collaborated with director Jacques Tourneur on Cat People (1942) and, after the end of Lewton's time at RKO, Out of the Past (1947). He was nominated for a 1947 Academy Award for his work on I Remember Mama. After working briefly at Warner Bros. in the late 1950s, Musuraca joined Desilu, where he spent his last active years in TV work including the television series F Troop.

According to Eric Schaefer:

Nicholas Musuraca's name remains unjustly obscure among the ranks of cinematographers from Hollywood's golden age. In his prime years at RKO during the 1940s, Musuraca shuttled back and forth between A- and B-films, prestige pictures, and genre potboilers. For this reason, and because many of the motion pictures photographed by Musuraca have attained a classic or landmark status only recently, he remains a neglected master.

Along with Gregg Toland's work on Citizen Kane (1941), Musuraca's cinematography for Stranger on the Third Floor (1940) defined the visual conventions for the film noir and codified the RKO look for the 1940s. Musuraca's photography begins and ends with shadows, owing a major debt to German Expressionism, and can be seen as the leading factor in the resurrection of the style in Hollywood in the 1940s. The dominant tone in his work is black, a stylistic bias that lent itself to the film noir and the moody horror films of Val Lewton.

But even within the confines of the studio system Musuraca succeeded in transposing his style to other genres. The western Blood on the Moon (1948) and George Stevens's nostalgic family drama I Remember Mama (1948) are both infused with the same shadowy visuals that Musuraca brought to the horror film in Cat People (1942) and the film noir in The Locket (1946). Through the conventions of varying genres and the differing requirements of numerous directors, Musuraca maintained a uniform personal aesthetic".

== Selected filmography ==
- The Glorious Adventure (1922)
- A Gipsy Cavalier (1922)
- The Virgin Queen (1923)
- On the Banks of the Wabash (1923)
- Bride of the Storm (1926)
- His New York Wife (1926)
- Shameful Behavior? (1926)
- The Passionate Quest (1926)
- The Sonora Kid (1927)
- South Sea Love (1927)
- Lightning Lariats (1927)
- Tom's Gang (1927)
- The Desert Pirate (1927)
- The Cherokee Kid (1927)
- Splitting the Breeze (1927)
- When the Law Rides (1928)
- Phantom of the Range (1928)
- Dog Justice (1928)
- Fangs of the Wild (1928)
- The Avenging Rider (1928)
- The Charge of the Gauchos (1928)
- Rough Ridin' Red (1928)
- Orphan of the Sage (1928)
- Red Riders of Canada (1928)
- Idaho Red (1929)
- The Pride of Pawnee (1929)
- The Red Sword (1929)
- The Freckled Rascal (1929)
- Side Street (1929)
- The Cuckoos (1930)
- Half Shot at Sunrise (1930)
- Cracked Nuts (1931)
- Smart Woman (1931)
- Headline Shooter (1933)
- Long Lost Father (1934)
- Where Sinners Meet (1934)
- Romance in Manhattan (1935)
- Border Cafe (1937)
- Night Spot (1938)
- Five Came Back (1939)
- Sorority House (1939)
- Golden Boy (1939, with Karl Freund)
- Stranger on the Third Floor (1940)
- Tom Brown's School Days (1940)
- Little Men (1940)
- The Gay Falcon (1941)
- The Tuttles of Tahiti (1942)
- Cat People (1942)
- The Seventh Victim (1943)
- Forever and a Day (1943)
- The Ghost Ship (1943)
- Gangway for Tomorrow (1943)
- The Fallen Sparrow (1943)
- The Girl Rush (1944)
- The Curse of the Cat People (1944)
- China Sky (1945)
- Back to Bataan (1945)
- Bedlam (1946)
- The Spiral Staircase (1946)
- Deadline at Dawn (1946)
- The Locket (1946)
- Out of the Past (1947)
- The Bachelor and the Bobby-Soxer (1947)
- I Remember Mama (1948)
- Blood on the Moon (1948)
- I Married a Communist (1949)
- Where Danger Lives (1950)
- Born to Be Bad (1950)
- Hunt the Man Down (1950)
- The Whip Hand (1951)
- A Girl in Every Port (1952)
- Roadblock (1951)
- Clash by Night (1952)
- Split Second (1953)
- Devil's Canyon (1953)
- The Hitch-Hiker (1953)
- The Blue Gardenia (1953)
- Susan Slept Here (1954)
- Man on the Prowl (1957)
- The Story of Mankind (1957)
- Too Much, Too Soon (1958)
