= Border Cafe (film) =

1937 film by Lew Landers

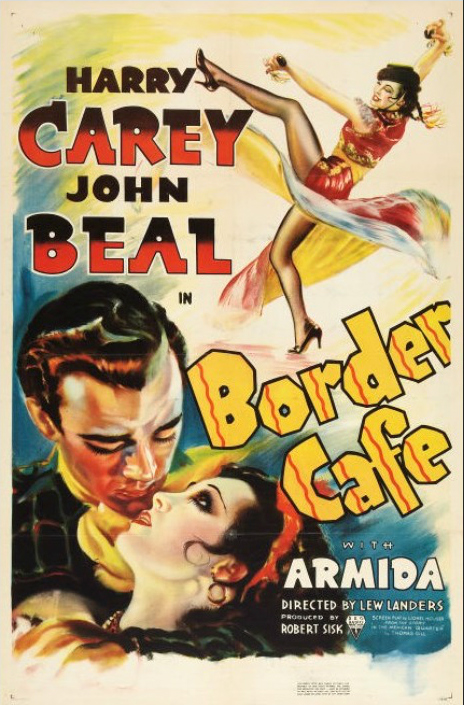
- Film poster
- Directed by: Lew Landers
- Screenplay by: Lionel Houser
- Based on: In the Mexican Quarter; 1930 story in Hearst's International Cosmopolitan by Thomas Gill
- Produced by: Robert Sisk
- Starring: Harry Carey
- Cinematography: Nicholas Musuraca
- Edited by: Jack Hively
- Distributed by: RKO Radio Pictures
- Release date: June 4, 1937
- Running time: 67 minutes
- Country: United States
- Language: English

Border Cafe is a 1937 American Western film directed by Lew Landers and starring Harry Carey.

== Plot ==
Keith Whitney, the son of a wealthy senator, travels to the western part of the country to purchase a ranch. After losing his money at a cafe near the border, he is taken in by a rancher named Tex, who offers him refuge and makes him a partial owner of the ranch. When Keith's father and girlfriend are kidnapped, Tex and Keith team up to rescue them. Along the way, Keith transforms from an intoxicated patron to a hero, and ultimately helps to save the day.

== Cast ==
- Harry Carey as Tex Stevens
- John Beal as Keith Whitney
- Armida as Dominga
- George Irving as Senator Henry Whitney
- Leona Roberts as Mrs. Emily Whitney
- J. Carrol Naish as Rocky Alton
- Marjorie Lord as Janet Barry
- Lee Patrick as Ellie
- Paul Fix as "Doley" Dolson
- Max Wagner as Shakey, Rocky's Henchman
- Walter Miller as Evans, Rocky's Henchman

== See also ==
- List of American films of 1937
- Harry Carey filmography
