= Barney Furey =

American actor (1886–1938)

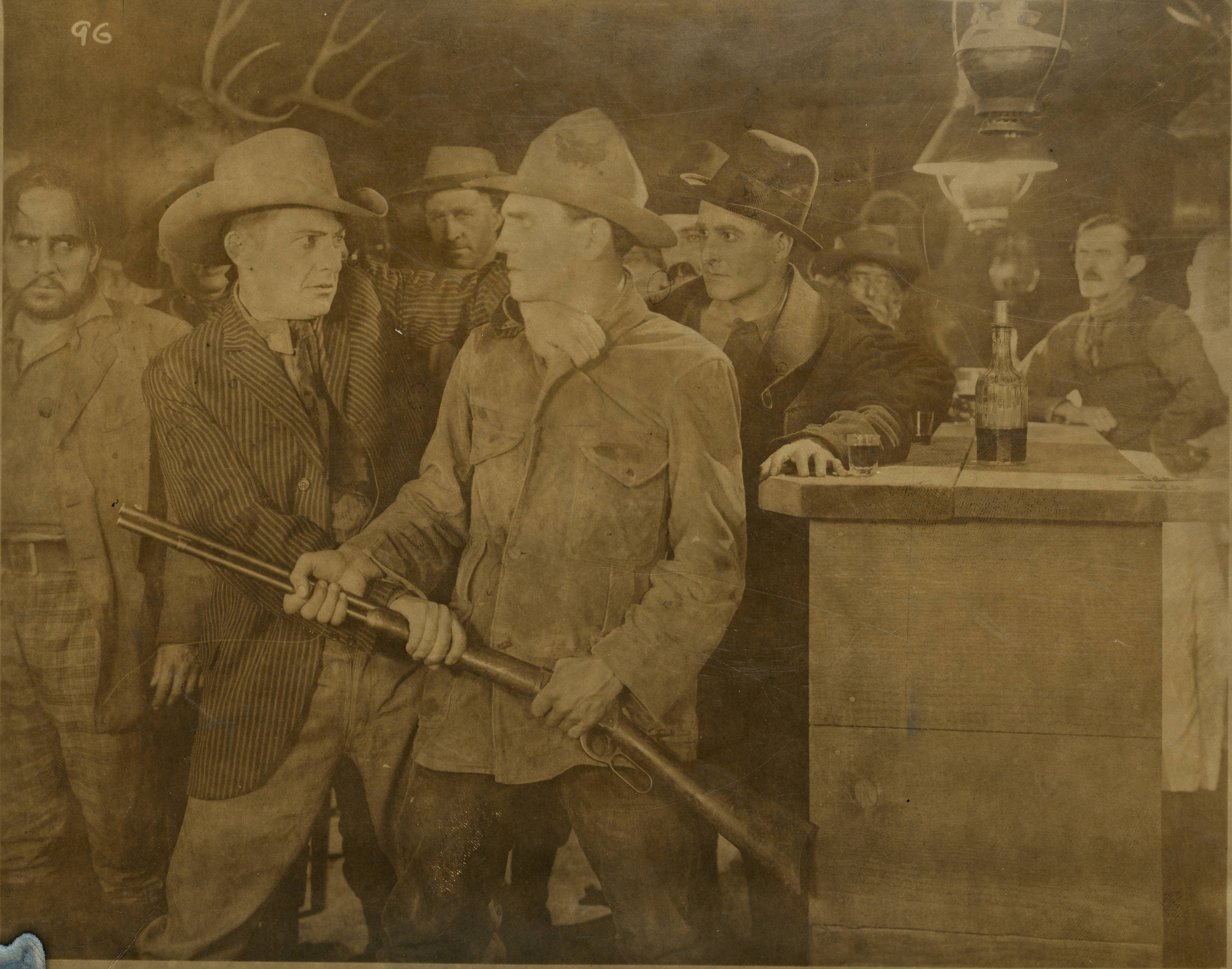
- Still from The Confession (1920) with Furey in the striped coat
- Born: Charles Manford Furey; September 7, 1886; Boise, Idaho, U.S.
- Died: January 18, 1938 (aged 51); Hollywood, California, U.S.
- Occupation: Actor
- Years active: 1912–1937

Charles Manford "Barney" Furey (September 7, 1886 – January 18, 1938) was an American actor of the silent era. He appeared in more than 100 films between 1912 and 1937. He was born in Boise, Idaho and died in Hollywood, California.

== Selected filmography ==
- The Love Transcendent (1915)
- The Gambler's I.O.U. (1915)
- A Day's Adventure (1915)
- The Canceled Mortgage (1915)
- Truth Stranger Than Fiction (1915)
- The Social Pirates (1916)
- The Golden Thought (1917)
- A Branded Soul (1917)
- Western Blood (1918)
- The Confession (1920)
- Terror Trail (1921)
- Experience (1921)
- The Man Trackers (1921)
- Headin' North (1921)
- The Empty Saddle (1925)
- Red Hot Hoofs (1926)
- The Mile-a-Minute Man (1926)
- Stick to Your Story (1926)
- Tom's Gang (1927)
- The Flying U Ranch (1927)
- Splitting the Breeze (1927)
- The Sonora Kid (1927)
- Tyrant of Red Gulch (1928)
- Red Riders of Canada (1928)
- Lightning Speed (1928)
- When the Law Rides (1928)
- Captain Careless (1928)
- Idaho Red (1929)
- The Pride of Pawnee (1929)
- The Drifter (1929)
- Beau Bandit (1930)
- Fighting Caballero (1935)
