= 1907 in literature =

This article contains information about the literary events and publications of 1907.

== Events ==
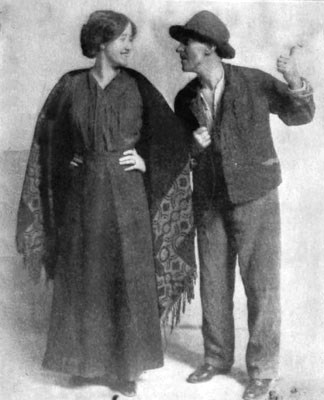
Irish actors Sara Allgood ("Widow Quin") and J. M. Kerrigan ("Shawn Keogh"), in The Playboy of the Western World, Plymouth Theatre, Boston, 1911

- January 3 – The National Theatre opens in Sofia, Bulgaria.
- January 26 – Many of the audience boo the opening performance of J. M. Synge's The Playboy of the Western World at the Abbey Theatre, Dublin. Disturbances continue for a week.
- February 4 – The poet W. B. Yeats, at a public debate at the Abbey Theatre, denies trying to suppress audience distaste during a performance of The Playboy of the Western World.
- February 22 – Leonid Andreyev's symbolist drama The Life of Man («Жизнь человека», Zhizn cheloveka) is premièred at the Komissarzhevskaya Theatre in Saint Petersburg, directed by Vsevolod Meyerkhold. On December 12 it is performed for the first time at the Moscow Art Theatre, directed by Konstantin Stanislavski and Leopold Sulerzhitsky.
- March – The Diamond Sūtra, a woodblock printed Buddhist scripture dated AD 868, is discovered by Aurel Stein at the Mogao Caves near Dunhuang in China. It is said to be "the earliest complete survival of a dated printed book".
- March–April
  - As an aftermath of the Romanian peasants' revolt comes a government clampdown on the radical authors Constantin Banu and Nicolae Iorga, whose homes are raided by police. N. D. Cocea is prosecuted for sedition and Barbu Lăzăreanu expelled from the country; I. C. Vissarion, who allegedly planned an attack on Titu, is arrested and sentenced to death, but ultimately reprieved. From Berlin, Ion Luca Caragiale watches the events with a "hopelessness stifled by disgust", as reported by his son Luca. His exposé demanding social justice in the Romanian Kingdom is translated into German by Mite Kremnitz and carried by Die Zeit of Vienna. The "pillars of fire" witnessed by Banu inspire him to name his 1911 magazine Flacăra – "Flame".
  - Virginia Stephen, the future Virginia Woolf, and others of her family move within London's Bloomsbury to 29 Fitzroy Square, a former home of George Bernard Shaw.
- April 17 – August Strindberg's A Dream Play (Ett drömspel, 1901) receives its first performance, at the Swedish Theatre (Stockholm), with his ex-wife Harriet Bosse in the leading rôle.
- April 23 – Jack and Charmian London sail out of San Francisco Bay to begin the voyage described in The Cruise of the Snark (1911).
- May–September – Kenneth Grahame writes letters to his son that become the basis for The Wind in the Willows (1908).
- May – British publishers Thomas Nelson and William Collins, Sons (as "Books for the million") launch cheap hardback in-copyright imprints.
- May 15 – American humorist Gelett Burgess coins the term "blurb" for promotional text on a book jacket.
- June 1 – Black Slave's Cry to Heaven (simplified Chinese: 黑奴吁天录; traditional Chinese: 黑奴籲天錄; pinyin: Hēinú Yūtiān Lù), adapted by Zeng Xiaogu from Uncle Tom's Cabin, is first performed by Tokyo-based Chinese student troupe Chunliu She, considered one of the first Western-style theatrical performances in Chinese.
- June 26 – Mark Twain receives an honorary doctorate of laws from the University of Oxford, England; Rudyard Kipling is also honoured at the ceremony.
- September 7 – Gaston Leroux's pioneering locked room mystery, The Mystery of the Yellow Room (Le Mystère de la chambre jaune), begins to be serialized in L'Illustration, Paris.
- November – While tutoring a Trieste businessman in English, James Joyce reveals that he is a writer, and his pupil, known to Joyce as Ettore Schmitz, proves to be the published novelist Italo Svevo. A literary friendship ensues.
- Uncertain dates
  - A deluxe edition of Margarete Böhme's Tagebuch einer Verlorenen published in Berlin marks 100,000 copies in print.
  - Éditions Grasset is established in Paris.
  - Thomas Mofolo's Moeti oa bochabela (much later translated into English as "The Traveler of the East") becomes the first work of literature to be published in the Sotho language.
  - Hélène van Zuylen leaves her partner Renée Vivien for another woman. Vivien's volume of love poetry Flambeaux éteints (Doused Torches) is published this year.
  - Anino ng Kahapon, a Tagalog-language novel is published.

== New books ==
=== Fiction ===
- Sholom Aleichem – From Home to America (פֿון דער היים קיין אַמעריקע, Fun der heym keyn amerike), first part of Motl, Peysi the Cantor's Son: The Writings of an Orphan Boy (מאָטל פּייסי דעם חזנס; כתבֿים פֿון אַ ייִנגל אַ יתום, Motl peysi dem khazns: ksovim fun a yingl a yosem)
- Guillaume Apollinaire (as 'G.A.') – Les Onze Mille Verges
- Arnold Bennett – The City of Pleasure
- André Billy – Benoni
- Marjorie Bowen – The Master of Stair
- Mary Elizabeth Braddon – Dead Love Has Chains
- Joseph Conrad – The Secret Agent
- Jeffery Farnol – My Lady Caprice
- E. M. Forster – The Longest Journey
- Elinor Glyn – Three Weeks
- Ian Hay – Pip
- Robert Hichens – Barbary Sheep
- Roy Horniman – Israel Rank: The Autobiography of a Criminal
- William Dean Howells – Through the Eye of the Needle
- Liu E (劉鶚) – The Travels of Lao Can (老殘遊記, Lao Ts'an yu-chi)
- Arthur Machen – The Hill of Dreams
- Octave Mirbeau – La 628-E8
- Baroness Orczy
  - Beau Brocade
  - The Tangled Skein
- Gertrude Page – Love in the Wilderness
- Ferdynand Antoni Ossendowski – W ludskoi pyli (In Human Dust)
- Emilio Salgari – Sandokan to the Rescue
- Upton Sinclair – The Overman
- Fyodor Sologub – The Petty Demon («Мелкий бес», Melkiy bes, book publication)
- Edith Wharton – Madame de Treymes
- Owen Wister – The Seven Ages of Washington
- P. G. Wodehouse – Not George Washington
- Harold Bell Wright – The Shepherd of the Hills

=== Children and young people ===
- Among Gnomes and Trolls (Bland tomtar och troll – first annual anthology)
- L. Frank Baum
  - Father Goose's Year Book
  - Ozma of Oz
  - Aunt Jane's Nieces Abroad (as Edith Van Dyne)
  - Policeman Bluejay (as Laura Bancroft)
- E. Nesbit – The Enchanted Castle
- Beatrix Potter – The Tale of Tom Kitten

=== Drama ===
- Leonid Andreyev – The Life of Man («Жизнь человека», Zhizn cheloveka, February 22, Komissarzhevskaya Theatre, Saint Petersburg)
- Sholem Asch – Got fun nekome (God of Vengeance)
- Jacinto Benavente – Los intereses creados (The Bonds of Interest)
- Hall Caine – The Christian (new version)
- Georges Feydeau – A Flea in Her Ear (La Puce à l'oreille)
- Henry James – The High Bid
- Agha Hashar Kashmiri – Safed Khoon (adaptation of King Lear)
- Thomas Mann – Fiorenza
- John Masefield – The Campden Wonder
- W. Somerset Maugham – Lady Frederick
- Quintero brothers
  - El traje de luces
  - La patria chica
- George Ranetti – Romeo și Julietta la Mizil
- Victorien Sardou – The Affair of the Poisons (L'affaire des poisons)
- John Millington Synge – The Playboy of the Western World
- Teffi – The Woman Question (published)

=== Poetry ===
- James Elroy Flecker – The Bridge of Fire
- Robert W. Service – The Songs of a Sourdough

=== Non-fiction ===
- Henri Bergson – Creative Evolution
- Edmund Gosse (anonymously) – Father and Son
- John Millington Synge – The Aran Islands
- George Witton – Scapegoats of the Empire

== Births ==
- February 1 – Günter Eich, German lyricist (died 1972)
- February 3 (probable date) – James A. Michener, American novelist (died 1997)
- February 18 – Traian Herseni, Romanian social scientist and journalist (died 1980)
- February 21 – W. H. Auden, English poet (died 1973)
- March 9 (February 24 O.S.) – Mircea Eliade, Romanian historian, philosopher and novelist (died 1986)
- April 7 – Violette Leduc, French novelist and memoirist (died 1972)
- April 9 – E. J. Scovell, English poet (died 1999)
- April 30 – Jacob Hiegentlich, gay Dutch Jewish writer (suicide 1940)
- May 5 – Iryna Vilde, Ukrainian writer (died 1982)
- May 12 – Leslie Charteris, Singapore-born Chinese-British genre novelist (died 1993)
- May 13 – Daphne du Maurier, English writer (died 1989)
- May 27 – Rachel Carson, American environmentalist and author (died 1964)
- June 2 – John Lehmann, English poet, autobiographer and publisher (died 1987)
- June 4 – Jacques Roumain, Haitian writer and politician (died 1944)
- June 14
  - Nicolas Bentley, British writer and illustrator (died 1978)
  - René Char, French poet (died 1988)
- July 7 – Robert A. Heinlein, American author (died 1988)
- July 29 – Aileen Fox (née Henderson), English archaeologist (died 2005)
- July 31 – Gerald Butler, English crime writer (died 1988)
- August 12 – Miguel Torga, Portuguese author (died 1995)
- August 17 – Roger Peyrefitte, French author (died 2000)
- August 28 – Rupert Hart-Davis, English editor and publisher (died 1999)
- September 23 – Anne Desclos (pseudonyms include Dominique Aury and Pauline Réage), French journalist and erotic novelist (died 1998)
- October 15 – Varian Fry, American journalist (died 1967)
- October 18 – Mihail Sebastian, Romanian Jewish playwright, essayist and novelist (died 1945)
- October 28 – John Hewitt, Northern Irish poet (died 1987)
- November 14 – Astrid Lindgren, Swedish author of children's books (died 2002)
- November 27 – L. Sprague de Camp, American science fiction and fantasy author (died 2000)
- November 28 – Alberto Moravia, Italian novelist (died 1990)
- November 30 – Jacques Barzun, French-born American historian (died 2012)
- December 10 – Rumer Godden, English novelist (died 1998)
- December 17 – Christianna Brand (Mary Christianna Lewis), British crime novelist (died 1988)
- December 18 – Christopher Fry, English dramatist (died 2005)
- December 19 – William Glynne-Jones, Welsh novelist and children's writer (died 1977)
- December 27 – Mary Howard, English romance novelist (died 1991)
- unknown dates
  - Abdullah al-Qasemi, Arab writer (died 1996)
  - Filimon Săteanu, Soviet Moldovan poet (shot 1937)

== Deaths ==
- January 20 – Agnes Mary Clerke, English author on astronomy (born 1842)
- January 21 – Bertram Fletcher Robinson, English journalist, editor and author (born 1870)
- February 16 – Giosuè Carducci, Italian writer, Nobel Prize laureate (b. 1835)
- March 9 – Frederic George Stephens, English critic and member of the Pre-Raphaelite Brotherhood (born 1828)
- March 19 – Thomas Bailey Aldrich, American poet and novelist (born 1836)
- April 23 – André Theuriet, French poet and novelist (born 1833)
- May 9 – Melissa Elizabeth Banta, American poet, travel writer (born 1834)
- May 12 – Joris-Karl Huysmans, French author (born 1848)
- May 18 – Mary De Morgan, English children's writer and suffragist (born 1850)
- May 31 – Sarah Gibson Humphreys, American author and suffragist (born 1830)
- June 12 – Ellen Russell Emerson, American author and ethnologist (born 1837)
- July 17 – Hector Malot, French author (born 1830)
- July 19 – William Gunion Rutherford, Scottish classicist (born 1853)
- July 28 – Mildred A. Bonham, American travel writer (born 1840)
- August 1 – Lucy Mabel Hall-Brown, American physician and writer (born 1843)
- August 10 – Marko Vovchok, Ukrainian novelist and short story writer (born 1833)
- August 25 – Mary Elizabeth Coleridge, English novelist and poet (appendicitis complications, born 1861)
- September 6 – Sully Prudhomme, French poet and essayist; 1st Nobel Prize winner (born 1839)
- September 7 – Bogdan Petriceicu Hasdeu, Romanian philologist and polygraph (born 1836)
- September 8 – Iosif Vulcan, Romanian poet, playwright and novelist (born 1841)
- October 6 – David Masson, Scottish critic and biographer (born 1822)
- October 29 – Mkrtich Khrimian, Armenian Catholicos, essayist and poet (died 1820)
- October 30 – Caroline Dana Howe, American author (born 1824)
- November 1 – Alfred Jarry, French dramatist (tuberculosis, born 1873)
- November 28 – Stanisław Wyspiański, Polish dramatist, poet and painter (born 1869)
- December 28 – Louise Granberg, Swedish playwright (born 1812)

== Awards ==
- Chancellor's Gold Medal: Donald Welldon Corrie
- Newdigate Prize: Robert Cruttwell, Camoens
- Nobel Prize for Literature: Rudyard Kipling
