= Cultural depictions of George IV =

George IV has been depicted many times in popular culture.

== Literature ==
- George IV appears as a character in Rodney Stone by Arthur Conan Doyle (1896), where he is shown as an irresponsible spendthrift, wildly self-indulgent and given to self-delusion, but not without some kindly impulses.
- In Bernard Cornwell's novel Sharpe's Regiment, which is set during the Regency period, he is portrayed as fat, extravagant and possibly suffering from the same insanity which had afflicted his father. He is an enthusiastic fan of Richard Sharpe's military exploits, and claims to have been present at the Battle of Talavera and to have helped Sharpe capture a French Imperial Eagle (an event depicted in Cornwell's earlier novel Sharpe's Eagle). In the novel's afterword, Cornwell said he based the remark on an historical incident when George, during a dinner party at which the Duke of Wellington was present, claimed to have led a charge at the Battle of Waterloo.
- George IV appears as a character in The Regency, Volume 13 of The Morland Dynasty, a series of historical novels by author Cynthia Harrod-Eagles. The fictional Lucy Morland, Countess of Aylesbury, is one of his 'set' and his reign and regency provide the backdrop to the novel.
- Bernard Bastable's Dead, Mr. Mozart (1995) is a detective novel whose main character is an alternate version of Wolfgang Mozart who survives in the 1820s and has settled in England. The story's main crisis is that odd circumstances have drawn Mozart into damage control duty to prevent further eruption of the enmity between King George IV and Caroline of Brunswick immediately following the old king's death.

== Film ==
On screen, George IV has been portrayed by:

- Charles Chapman in the silent short Beau Brummel (1913), based on the novel by Booth Tarkington
- Teddy Arundell in the silent film The Romance of Lady Hamilton (1919)
- Alfred Paumier in the silent film The Amateur Gentleman (1920), based on the novel by Jeffery Farnol
- Bellenden Powell in the silent film A Prince of Lovers (1921), based on the play by Alicia Ramsey
- Holmes Herbert in the silent film A Stage Romance (1922), based on the play Kean by Alexandre Dumas, père
- Willard Louis in the silent film Beau Brummel (1924), based on the play by Clyde Fitch
- Otto Dethlefsen in the French silent film Kean, based on the Alexandre Dumas play
- Gino Corrado in the silent film The Amateur Gentleman (1926), also based on the novel by Jeffery Farnol
- Lumsden Hare in The House of Rothschild (1934), based on the play Rothschild by George Hembert Westley
- Nigel Bruce in The Scarlet Pimpernel (1934), based on the plays by Baroness Orczy and Montagu Barstow
- Olaf Hytten in Becky Sharp (1935), based on the play by Langdon Mitchell, itself based on the novel Vanity Fair by William Makepeace Thackeray
- Gilbert Davis in The Amateur Gentleman (1936)
- Hugh Huntley in Lloyd's of London (1936)
- Evelyn Roberts in Return of the Scarlet Pimpernel (1937)
- Raymond Lovell in The Man in Grey (1943), based on the novel by Lady Eleanor Smith
- Michael Dyne in Kitty (1945), based on the novel by Rosamond Marshall
- Peter Graves in The Laughing Lady (1946), based on the play by Ingram D'Abbes, and Mrs. Fitzherbert (1947), based on the novel by Winifred Carter
- Cecil Parker in The First Gentleman (1948), based on the play by Norman Ginsbury
- Jack Hawkins in The Elusive Pimpernel (1950)
- Peter Ustinov in Beau Brummell (1954), based on a play by Clyde Fitch
- Roy Kinnear in the musical comedy On a Clear Day You Can See Forever (1970), based on the musical by Alan Jay Lerner and Burton Lane
- Ralph Richardson in Lady Caroline Lamb (1972)
- John Sessions in Princess Caraboo (1994)
- Rupert Everett in The Madness of King George (1994), based on the play The Madness of George III
- James Saxon in Poldark (1996)
- Richard McCabe, billed as "The King" in Vanity Fair (2004)
- Tim McInnerny in Peterloo (2018)

== Television ==
On television, George IV has been played by:

- Robert Stephens in the BBC Play of the Month Kean (1978), based on the play by Jean-Paul Sartre about the actor Edmund Kean
- Peter Egan in the BBC drama series Prince Regent (1979), covering his life until his ascent to the throne
- Julian Fellowes in the British dramas The Scarlet Pimpernel (1982) and Sharpe's Regiment (1996), the latter based on the novel by Bernard Cornwell
- David King in the episode of the Yorkshire Television drama series Number 10 entitled "The Iron Duke" (1983)
- Roy Dotrice in the miniseries Shaka Zulu (1986), based on the novel by Joshua Sinclair
- Peter Schofield in the BBC series Vanity Fair (1987)
- Hugh Laurie in the BBC TV comedy series Blackadder the Third (1987), in which his absurd lifestyle as Prince Regent is the focus of much malice by other characters, particular his butler Mr. Edmund Blackadder (Rowan Atkinson), who repeatedly makes sarcastic references to the Prince's stupidity and incompetence and takes advantage of it. The concluding episode of the series depicts the Prince being unwittingly gunned down by the Duke of Wellington (Stephen Fry), and Blackadder assuming his identity, eventually becoming George IV. The Prince's personality was passed on to Laurie's character in Blackadder Goes Forth, World War I Lieutenant George.
- James Saxon in the Yorkshire Television sitcom Haggard (1990) and the British drama Poldark (1996), based on the novels by Winston Graham
- Richard E. Grant in the 1996 BBC docudrama A Royal Scandal
- Roger Ashton-Griffiths in the drama series Vanity Fair (1998)
- Jonathan Coy in the British drama series The Scarlet Pimpernel (1999)
- Hugh Bonneville in the British drama Beau Brummell: This Charming Man (2006), based on the biography by Ian Kelly
- Jim Howick and Tom Stourton in the British TV comedy series Horrible Histories (2009–present)
- Mark Gatiss in the British TV Drama Taboo (2017)
- Ryan Gage in Queen Charlotte: A Bridgerton Story. He is shown in mourning for the death of his daughter.

== Radio ==
- Mark Perry in Bleak Expectations (2007)
- Alex Jennings in The People’s Princess (2008)
