= The Amateur Gentleman (disambiguation) =

The Amateur Gentleman is a novel. It may also refer to the following adaptations of the novel:

- The Amateur Gentleman (1920 film), a British film
- The Amateur Gentleman (1926 film), an American film
- The Amateur Gentleman (1936 film), a British film
