= John Leezer =

American cinematographer (died 1938)

John W. Leezer (c. 1873 – August 8, 1938) was an American cinematographer active during the silent era. He is credited with shooting at least thirty-three films for Paramount Pictures, Fine Arts, the Brentwood Film Corporation, and Robertson-Cole Pictures, among others.

== Biography ==
Leezer moved to Hollywood in 1912 to work as a photographer for D. W. Griffith.

Leezer had three children, Dorothy, Marion and Arthur. He lived for a time in Vista and in his last few years lived in Carlsbad. He died following a heart attack at his home in Carlsbad on August 8, 1938.

== Partial filmography ==
- The Lily and the Rose (1915)
- Acquitted (1916)
- The Wood Nymph (1916)
- The Mystery of the Leaping Fish (1916)
- Hell-to-Pay Austin (1916)
- Cheerful Givers (1917)
- Daughter Angele (1917)
- The Kid Is Clever (1918)
- The Hope Chest (1918)
- Nobody Home (1919)
- I'll Get Him Yet (1919)
- Nugget Nell (1919)
- The Feud (1919)
- The Triflers (1920)
- Just Like a Woman (1923)
- The Love Master (1924)
- White Fang (1925)
- The Wyoming Wildcat (1925)
- The Cowboy Musketeer (1925)
- The Arizona Streak (1926)
- Wild to Go (1926)
- The Masquerade Bandit (1926)
- The Cowboy Cop (1926)
- Out of the West (1926)
- Red Hot Hoofs (1926)
