= Ye Olde Chequers Inn =

Pub in Tonbridge, Kent, England

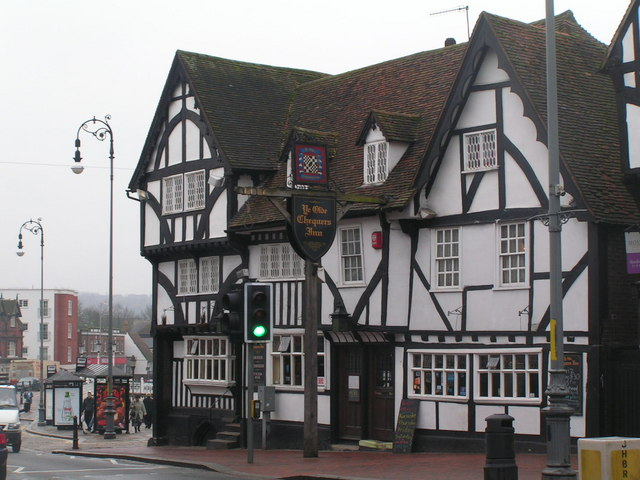
- Interactive map of the Ye Olde Chequers Inn area
- Alternative names: The Chequers

General information
- Type: Public house
- Architectural style: Timber-framed
- Location: 122 High Street, Tonbridge, Kent, TN9, England
- Coordinates: 51°11′47″N 0°16′30″E
- Completed: 15th century

Design and construction
- Designations

Listed Building – Grade II*
- Official name: Ye Olde Chequers Inn
- Designated: 8 May 1950
- Reference no.: 1069979

Ye Olde Chequers Inn, also known as The Chequers, is a Grade II* listed public house at 122 High Street in Tonbridge, Kent, England. A timber-framed building dated by Historic England to the 15th century, it stands on the west side of the High Street near the River Medway bridge, below Tonbridge Castle, and is one of the oldest surviving buildings in the town.

== Building ==
The inn was listed at Grade II* on 8 May 1950. The Historic England list entry describes it as a "very good example of a C15 timber-framed building" of three storeys and five windows, built in four sections, two projecting and two recessed. Its features include jettied upper floors carried on brackets and curved braces, a six-light oriel window with wooden mullions and a transom, gables with decorative curved timbers and cusped bargeboards, a tiled roof and sash windows with their original glazing bars. The building forms a listed group with the adjoining numbers 124 to 128 High Street.

== History ==
An inn stood on the site as early as 1264, and the name has been linked to the word "Exchequer" and to the gathering of fees for the lords of Tonbridge Castle. The Tonbridge Historical Society dates the present building to the late 15th century, while the pub's own publicity describes it as 14th century; Historic England assesses the structure as 15th century. The earliest documentary references to the inn by name are sale notices in the Maidstone Journal of 21 April 1801 and 26 October 1802, the latter advertising "that oldest established and good accustomed Inn or Public House, called the 'Chequers'".

A room on the first floor is said to have been used by magistrates as a Justices' room, and a noose, surviving as a decorative sign, recalls a tradition that a hangman's rope once hung from a beam projecting over the street. The ground outside the inn was a traditional site for the stocks, whipping post and other punishments. Among the legends attached to the pub is the claim that a brother of Wat Tyler was the last man hanged outside it. The Protestant martyr Margery Polley, a widow from Pembury, was burnt at the stake at Tonbridge on 17 July 1555 during the Marian persecutions, and local tradition associates the burning with the area near the Chequers. The inn appears as a setting in several novels by Jeffery Farnol, including The Broad Highway.

A near-continuous record of licensees from about 1801 to 1938 has been compiled from trade directories, census returns and newspaper licensing reports. The 1911 census records the family of the licensee Alfred Joseph Cantle living on the premises.

By the early 20th century the Chequers was a tied house of the Dartford Brewery Company, which was acquired jointly by Style & Winch of Maidstone and the Royal Brewery Brentford in 1924. Style & Winch was bought by Barclay Perkins of London in 1929; Barclay Perkins merged with Courage & Co. in 1955, and by the early 1980s the inn sold Courage beer.

== Present day ==
The inn continues to trade as an independently run pub serving cask ales including Harvey's Sussex Best Bitter and St Austell Tribute. It offers food and accommodation and has a garden with views of Tonbridge Castle.
