= Dorothy Dunbar =

American actress

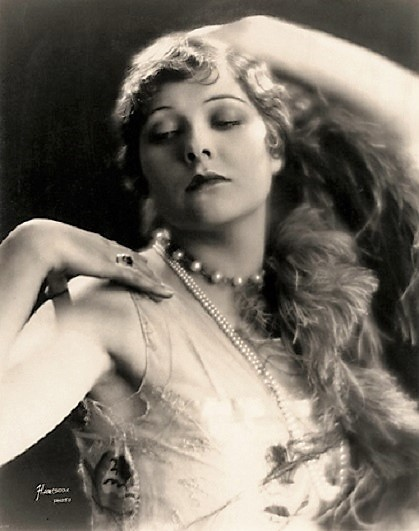
- Born: Dorothy Dunbar Lawson; May 28, 1902; Colorado Springs, Colorado, US
- Died: October 23, 1992 (aged 90); Seattle, Washington, US
- Occupation: Actress
- Years active: 1904–1927
- Children: 2

Dorothy Dunbar Lawson (May 28, 1902 – October 23, 1992) was an American actress and socialite, who appeared in silent movies in the 1920s.

== Early years ==
Born in Colorado Springs, Colorado, Dunbar became an actress despite her father's opposition. She appeared on the Broadway stage as a child in The School Girl (1904).

== Career ==
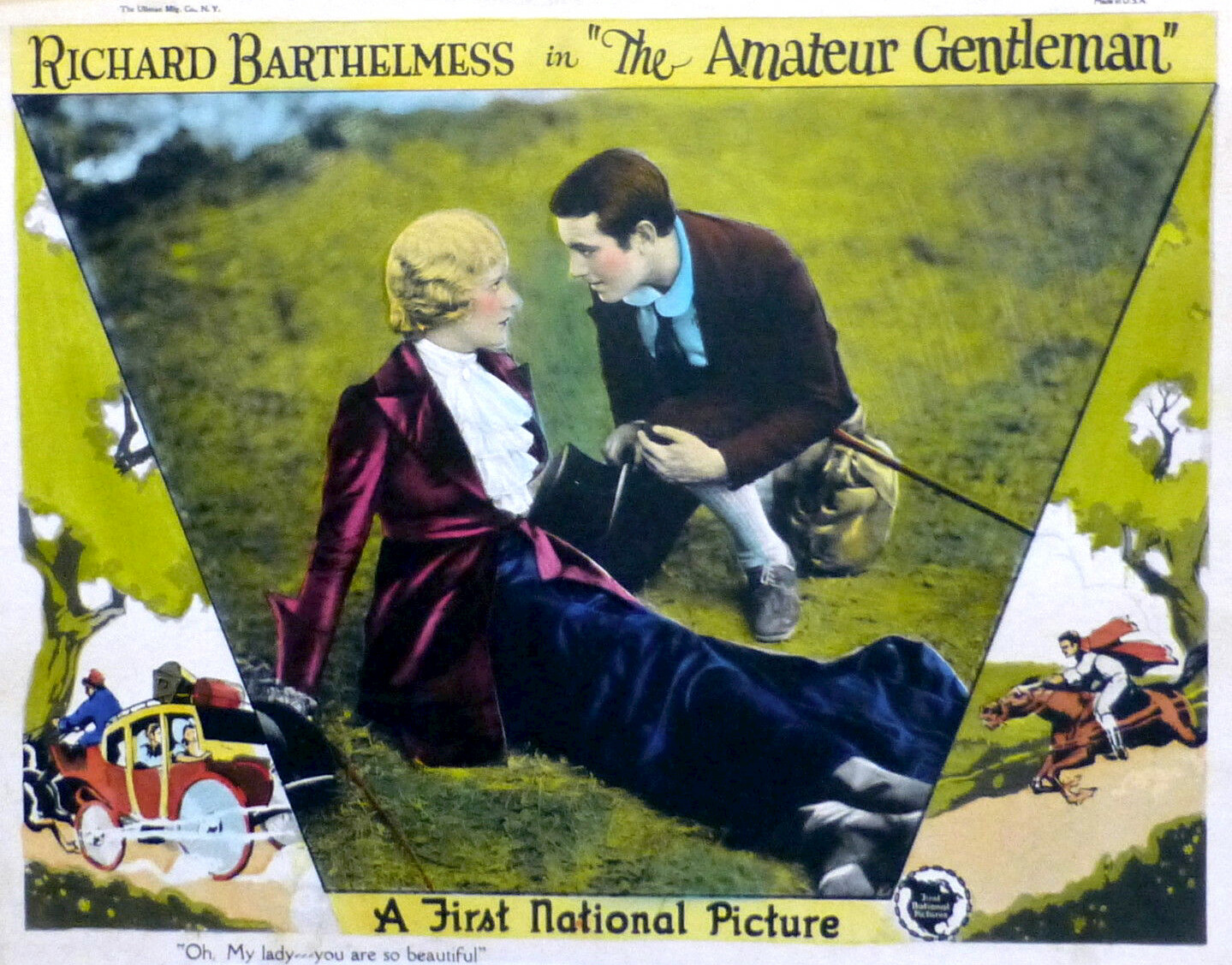
Lobby card for The Amateur Gentleman (1926)

In 1924, Dunbar went to Hollywood, where she made her film debut in the Western The Flaming Crisis (1924). She starred in several motion pictures, including her role as the heroine in The Amateur Gentleman (1926) opposite Richard Barthelmess, which attracted considerable attention for her.

While Dunbar was under contract to Film Booking Offices of America for $150 per week, she was the fourth actress who played Jane, starring in the 1927 version of the Tarzan story, Tarzan and the Golden Lion, opposite James Pierce, who played the title role.

Dunbar rejected a contract offer from Metro-Goldwyn-Mayer that would have had her in the lead female role opposite John Gilbert, opting to seek a long-term contract with a new British film company. However, that company's studio burned down and was not re-opened.

Dunbar retired before sound films came into being after working in Westerns for poverty row studios.

== Personal life and death ==
Dunbar left the movies upon marrying her second husband, wealthy Minneapolis society man Thomas Bucklin Wells, II, who apparently acted in one movie himself, Ain't Love Funny? released in 1927 by Film Booking Offices of America (FBO).

Dunbar's husbands included theatrical producer Maurice (divorced); Thomas Wells (married October 1926-his death); French Embassy attache Jaime De Garson (divorced 1931); boxer and actor Max Baer (married July 8, 1931-divorced 1933); portrait painter Tino Costa (married 1936 -annulled 1937); and Russell Lawson.

She and Lawson had two sons, Richard and Russell.

When Dunbar was preparing to divorce Tommy Wells, she received a cable from him to come to Paris, where he was dying. She rushed to his bedside in the French capital and forgave him. He died in her arms, having succumbed to drug addiction. She received a $2,500 monthly income from his estate. She divorced De Garson, whom she married in London, to marry Baer.

She later styled herself as Dorothy Dunbar Wells. In 1936, she completed a book of poetry, but had not found enough nerve to send it to a publisher. She had long decided movies were behind her.

Dunbar asked that her marriage to French husband Costa be annulled because he was "temperamental and cold." In December 1937, she sued family members of her former husband, Wells, seeking $270,000 in trusts from his estate, because she said they had misrepresented certain papers they gave her to sign after his death. They told her, she said, the documents were to make certain the trusts were held for her, but she learned later the papers were actually waivers of her interest in the trusts.

After marrying Lawson, her seventh husband, Dunbar went by the name Dorothy Wells Lawson. She played bridge and golf, and won some trophies.

On October 23, 1992, Dunbar died at age 90 in Seattle, Washington. Her memorial service was private by family.

== Filmography ==
- The Flaming Crisis (1924) (Mesco Productions) (Western) ... Tex Miller
- The Masquerade Bandit (1926) (FBO) (Western) ... Molly Marble
- The Amateur Gentleman (1926) (First National Pictures) (Drama/Romance) ... Lady Cleone Meredith
- Breed of the Sea (1926) (FBO) (Drama) ... Ruth Featherstone
- Red Hot Hoofs (1926) (FBO) (Western) ... Frances Morris
- Tarzan and the Golden Lion (1927) (FBO) (Action/Adventure) ... Lady Greystoke
- Lightning Lariats (1927) (FBO) (Western) ... Janet Holbrooke
- When a Dog Loves (1927) (FBO) (Drama) ... Letty Carroll
- What Price Love? (1927) (Anchor Film Distributors) (Drama) ... Alice George
