= John E. Burch =

American film assistant director

- Born: August 17, 1896; Chicago, Illinois United States
- Died: July 28, 1969 (aged 72); Honolulu, Hawaii, United States
- Occupations: Assistant director, production manager
- Years active: 1925–58

John E. Burch (August 17, 1896 – July 28, 1969) was an American film assistant director and production manager during the latter part of the silent era through the 1950s.

== Early life ==
Burch was born on August 17, 1896, in Chicago, Illinois to John Sebastian Burch and Mary Ann Pettit. Upon the United States' entry into World War One, Burch enlisted in the Navy, where he served aboard a submarine. At some point after the war, he moved from Chicago to Los Angeles, in an attempt to break into the film industry.

== Career ==
Burch's first foray into the cinematic world was as an actor in 1925's White Fang, adapted by Jane Murfin from the novel of the same name by Jack London. This would be his only on-screen appearance. The following year, as the assistant director on The Arizona Streak (1926), would see him begin a long career behind the camera as an assistant director, production manager and supervisor. The remainder of the 1920s would see him continue in the role of assistant director, as well as prop manager.

In 1931 Burch was credited as supervisor on Fanny Foley Herself. It was only the second film shot in the new Technicolor process. Over the course of his career, Burch would be involved in over 65 films. Some of the more notable films he worked on include: Li'l Abner (1940), where he was an assistant director for Albert S. Rogell; 1942's A Guy Named Joe, starring Spencer Tracy and Irene Dunne, on which he would be one of Victor Fleming's assistant directors; and Brewster's Millions (1945), starring Dennis O'Keefe, and directed by Allen Dwan, assisted by Burch. In 1936, Burch would be one of the early members of the Directors Guild of America. His final work in film would be on 1958's Thunder Road, starring Robert Mitchum, on which he worked as the production manager. After leaving the film industry, Burch would work for a short time in television, doing a few episodes for shows like The Untouchables, before working steadily as an assistant director on Bonanza from 1960 to 1962.

Burch died from pneumonia on July 28, 1969, in Honolulu, Hawaii.

== Filmography ==
(as per AFI's database)

| Year | Title | Role | Notes |
|---|---|---|---|
| 1925 | White Fang | Cast-Bill Morry | |
| 1926 | The Arizona Streak | Assistant director | |
| 1926 | The Cowboy Cop | Assistant director | |
| 1926 | Flaming Fury | Assistant director | |
| 1926 | Flashing Fangs | Assistant director | |
| 1926 | The Masquerade Bandit | Assistant director | |
| 1926 | Out of the West | Assistant director | |
| 1926 | Wild To Go | Assistant director | |
| 1929 | Gun Law | Assistant director | |
| 1929 | Pals of the Prairie | Assistant director | |
| 1929 | The Pride of Pawnee | Assistant director | |
| 1929 | The Trail of the Horse Thieves | Assistant director | |
| 1931 | The Perfect Alibi | Assistant director | |
| 1931 | Fanny Foley Herself | Production supervisor | |
| 1931 | Peach O'Reno | Production supervisor | |
| 1932 | Bird of Paradise | Production supervisor | |
| 1935 | Hi, Gaucho! | Production supervisor | |
| 1936 | Two in Revolt | Production supervisor | |
| 1936 | Chatterbox | Production associate | |
| 1936 | The Farmer in the Dell | Production supervisor | |
| 1937 | The Crime Nobody Saw | Assistant director | |
| 1937 | Artists and Models | Assistant director | |
| 1937 | King of Gamblers | Assistant director | |
| 1937 | Murder Goes to College | Assistant director | |
| 1938 | The Duke of West Point | Production manager | |
| 1939 | Fast and Furious | Assistant director | |
| 1940 | Kit Carson | Assistant director | |
| 1940 | Li'l Abner | Assistant director | |
| 1940 | Florian | Assistant director | |
| 1940 | South of Pago Pago | Assistant director | |
| 1941 | Miss Polly | Assistant director | |
| 1941 | Scattergood Baines | Assistant director | |
| 1941 | Scattergood Pulls the Strings | Assistant director | |
| 1941 | Tanks a Million | Assistant director | |
| 1941 | Double Cross | Production manager | |
| 1942 | Here We Go Again | Assistant director | |
| 1942 | The Moon and Sixpence | Assistant director | |
| 1942 | Scattergood Rides High | Assistant director | |
| 1943 | Cinderella Swings It | Assistant director | |
| 1943 | A Stranger in Town | Assistant director | |
| 1943 | Two Weeks to Live | Unit manager | |
| 1944 | A Guy Named Joe | Assistant director | |
| 1944 | Goin' to Town | Assistant director | |
| 1944 | Three Is a Family | Assistant director | |
| 1944 | Abroad with Two Yanks | Assistant director | |
| 1944 | Andy Hardy's Blonde Trouble | Assistant director | |
| 1944 | Since You Went Away | Unit manager | |
| 1945 | Brewster's Millions | Assistant director | |
| 1946 | Sister Kenny | Unit manager | |
| 1947 | Honeymoon | Production manager | |
| 1950 | Armored Car Robbery | Production manager | |
| 1950 | Bunco Squad | Production manager | |
| 1950 | Never a Dull Moment | Production manager | |
| 1952 | On Dangerous Ground | Assistant production manager | |
| 1953 | Second Chance | Assistant production manager | |
| 1955 | A Life in the Balance | Assistant director, production manager | |
| 1955 | Pearl of the South Pacific | Production supervisor | |
| 1955 | The Treasure of Pancho Villa | Unit manager | |
| 1955 | Not As a Stranger | Production manager | |
| 1956 | Bandido | Production supervisor | |
| 1956 | Great Day in the Morning | Unit manager | |
| 1957 | The Careless Years | Assistant director | |
| 1957 | Spring Reunion | Assistant director | |
| 1957 | Jet Pilot | Assistant production manager | |
| 1958 | Thunder Road | Production manager | |
