= Tarzan (radio program) =

Three radio jungle adventure programs

- Other names: Tarzan of the Apes; Tarzan and the Diamond of Ashair; Tarzan and the Fires of Tohr
- Genre: Jungle adventure
- Running time: 15 minutes (1932–1934, 1934–1936); 30 minutes (1951–1953)
- Country of origin: United States
- Language: English
- Home station: WOR (1932-1934 and 1934-1936); Mutual-Don Lee West Coast Network and CBS (1951–1953)
- Starring: James Pierce, Joan Burroughs (1932–1934); Carlton KaDell (1934–1936); Lamont Johnson (1950–1951)
- Written by: Rob Thompson (1934–1936); Bud Lesser (1950-1951
- Produced by: Frederick C. Dahlquist (1932–1934); Fred Shields (1934–1936); Walter White (1950–1951)
- Original release: September 12, 1932 – June 27, 1953

Tarzan is a generic title that can be applied to any of three radio jungle adventure programs in the United States. Two were broadcast in the 1930s and one in the 1950s.

== Format ==
As told in the Tarzan book series, the episodes centered around young Lord Greystoke, who was raised by a female ape as Tarzan, Lord of the Jungle, and Jane Parker, a girl who was separated from a safari. Vincent Terrace wrote in his book, Radio Programs, 1924-1984: A Catalog of More Than 1800 Shows, "Stories relate Tarzan's efforts to protect his adopted homeland from evildoers."

Producers of the transcribed programs added a touch of authenticity by going to zoos to record sounds of jungle animals and then using those sounds in appropriate places in episodes.

== 1932-1934 (Tarzan of the Apes) ==
The initial radio Tarzan originated at WOR in New York City and was syndicated by the World Broadcasting System. Production later switched to Hollywood, California. The series was broadcast September 12, 1932 - March 3, 1934.

Tarzan was played by James Pierce, who portrayed the title character in the silent film Tarzan and the Golden Lion (1927). Jane was played by Joan Burroughs, daughter of Edgar Rice Burroughs, creator of the Tarzan stories. The program's writer prepared scripts using material from the original Tarzan books, and Burroughs himself revised each script as needed for accuracy.

This version of Tarzan was notable for the extent of distribution of a recorded program. Jim Cox, in his book, Radio Crime Fighters: More Than 300 Programs from the Golden Age, wrote: "The first Tarzan show, produced and recorded by American Radio Features, set a distinct precedent in U.S. radio. It was actually the premier feature prerecorded and distributed to local broadcasters throughout the nation and overseas."

The youth-oriented program included two elements that were often found in other programs aimed at a young audience: a club centered on the central character and premiums that could be obtained by sending in elements such as labels or box tops from the sponsor's products. In the first 30 days after the Signal Tarzan Club was launched by sponsor Signal Oil, 15,000 youngsters from California signed up for it. During the club's first year, membership reached 125,000. Another sponsor, Fould's Milling Company of Chicago, received 93,000 package ends of its products in eight weeks through WBBM in Chicago and CKOK in the Windsor/Detroit market. The proofs of purchase were submitted to obtain "plaster of paris statuettes of various characters in the Tarzan series."

== 1934-1936 (Tarzan and the Diamond of Ashair and Tarzan and the Fires of Tohr) ==
Tarzan and the Diamond of Ashair (1934–1935) and Tarzan and the Fires of Tohr (1935–1936) applied a serial structure to the Tarzan episodes, with one story line in each of the two seasons. Andy Briggs, in his book, The Savage Lands, wrote, "Tarzan radio serials thrilled millions of listeners across the country."

An anecdote from Dayton, Ohio, demonstrated the popularity of the second Tarzan radio series—especially when its appeal was combined with the opportunity for a free viewing of the film The New Adventures of Tarzan. The trade publication Broadcasting reported that radio station WHIO joined with sponsoring milk dealers and producers to offer a showing of the film with one milk cap as admission. The result: "By curtain time more than 15,000 children were lined up for several blocks on each side of the movie house." The theater added two showings to accommodate the crowd.

== 1950-1951 version ==
This version was syndicated in addition to being carried on the Mutual-Don Lee West Coast Network. and on CBS. March 22, 1952 - June 27, 1953.

== Streaming audio ==
- Tarzan: The Diamond of Asher from Old Time Radio Researchers Group Library
- Tarzan: Fires of Tohr from Old Time Radio Researchers Group Library
- Tarzan: Lord of the Jungle from Old Time Radio Researchers Group Library
- Tarzan of the Apes from Old Time Radio Researchers Group Library
