= Manhattan (1924 film) =

1924 film by Robert Hubberthorne Burnside

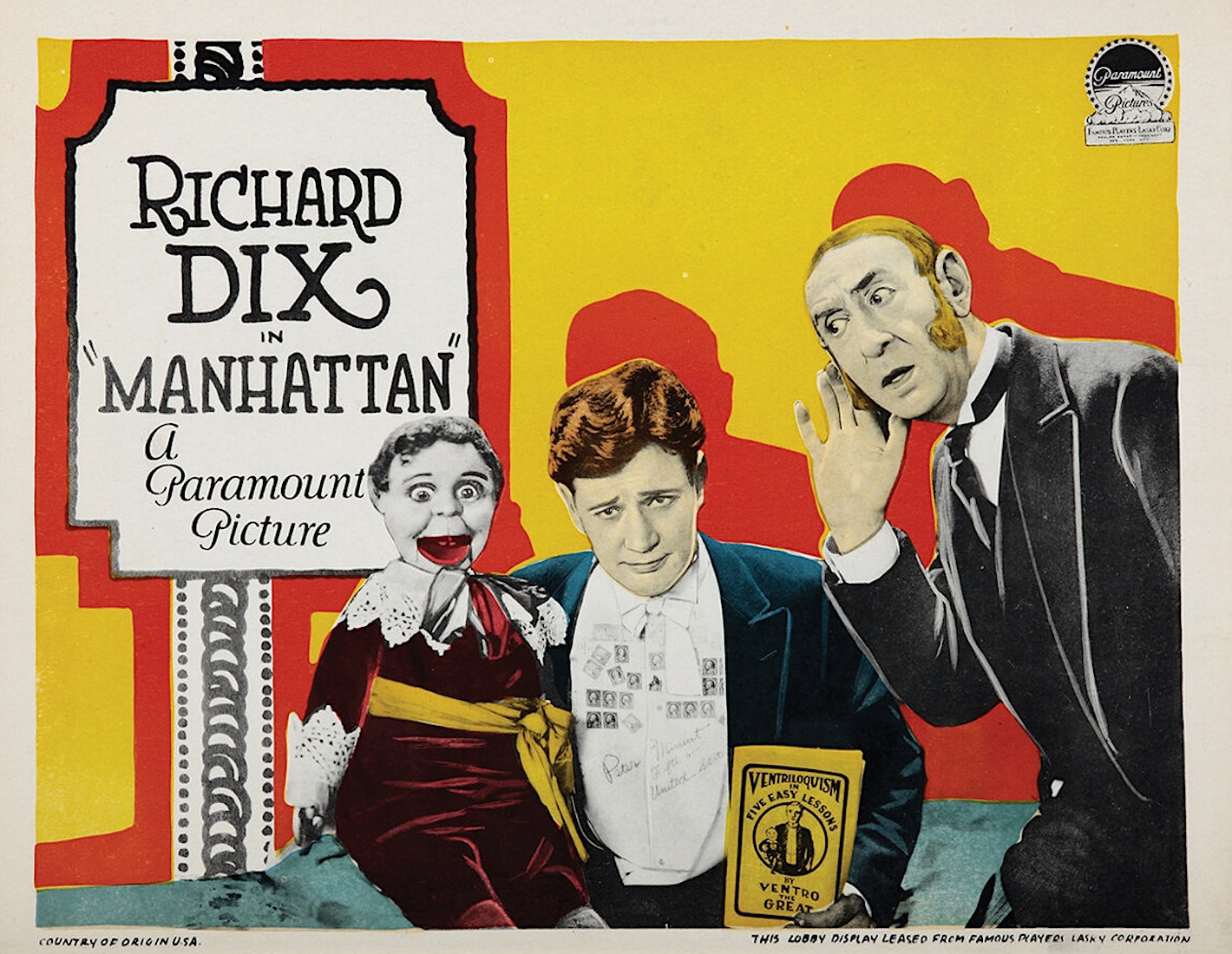
- Lobby card
- Directed by: R. H. Burnside
- Written by: Paul Sloane (scenario); Frank Tuttle (scenario)
- Based on: The Definite Object; 1917 novel by Jeffery Farnol
- Produced by: Adolph Zukor; Jesse L. Lasky
- Starring: Richard Dix
- Cinematography: Hal Rosson
- Distributed by: Paramount Pictures
- Release date: October 28, 1924
- Running time: 7 reels
- Country: United States
- Language: Silent (English intertitles)

Manhattan is a 1924 American silent romantic adventure film directed by R. H. Burnside featuring Richard Dix in his first starring role. It was adapted from Jeffery Farnol's bestselling novel The Definite Object. A wealthy New Yorker falls in love with a burglar's sister.

== Plot ==
As described in a review in a film magazine, Peter Minuit, wealthy and bored with life, is visited by a burglar who believes him one of his own kind. Peter, posing as Gentleman George, makes a deal with the chap, Spike, who hides him in his home where Peter meets and falls in love with his sister Mary. McGinnis, the head of the gang, wants to marry Mary and she agrees to save her brother and Peter. Peter takes her to his home and reveals his identity. McGinnis threatens to “get” him. Mary goes back to McGinnis. Peter follows and there is a fierce fight. McGinnis is shot by one of his henchmen who has a grudge. The gang is arrested and Peter takes his future wife back home.

== Cast ==
- Richard Dix as Peter Minuit
- Jacqueline Logan as Mary Malone
- Gregory Kelly as Spike, Mary's brother
- George Siegmann as Bud McGinnis
- Gunboat Smith as Joe Madden
- Oscar Brimberton Figman as Mr. Trapes
- Edna May Oliver as Mrs. Trapes
- Alice Chapin as Housekeeper
- James Bradbury, Sr. as Trainer

== Reception ==
Mordaunt Hall, critic for The New York Times, gave the movie a mixed review, stating that Kelly's "performance is easily the outstanding one in this production, and singularly enough it is the first time that he has acted before the camera." Hall thought, however, that Dix gave "just another motion-picture performance" and the narrative was "stretched to the breaking point."

== Preservation status ==
A print of the film reportedly survives at Cinemateket Svenska Filminstitutet, Stockholm.
