= The Flaming Crisis =

1924 film

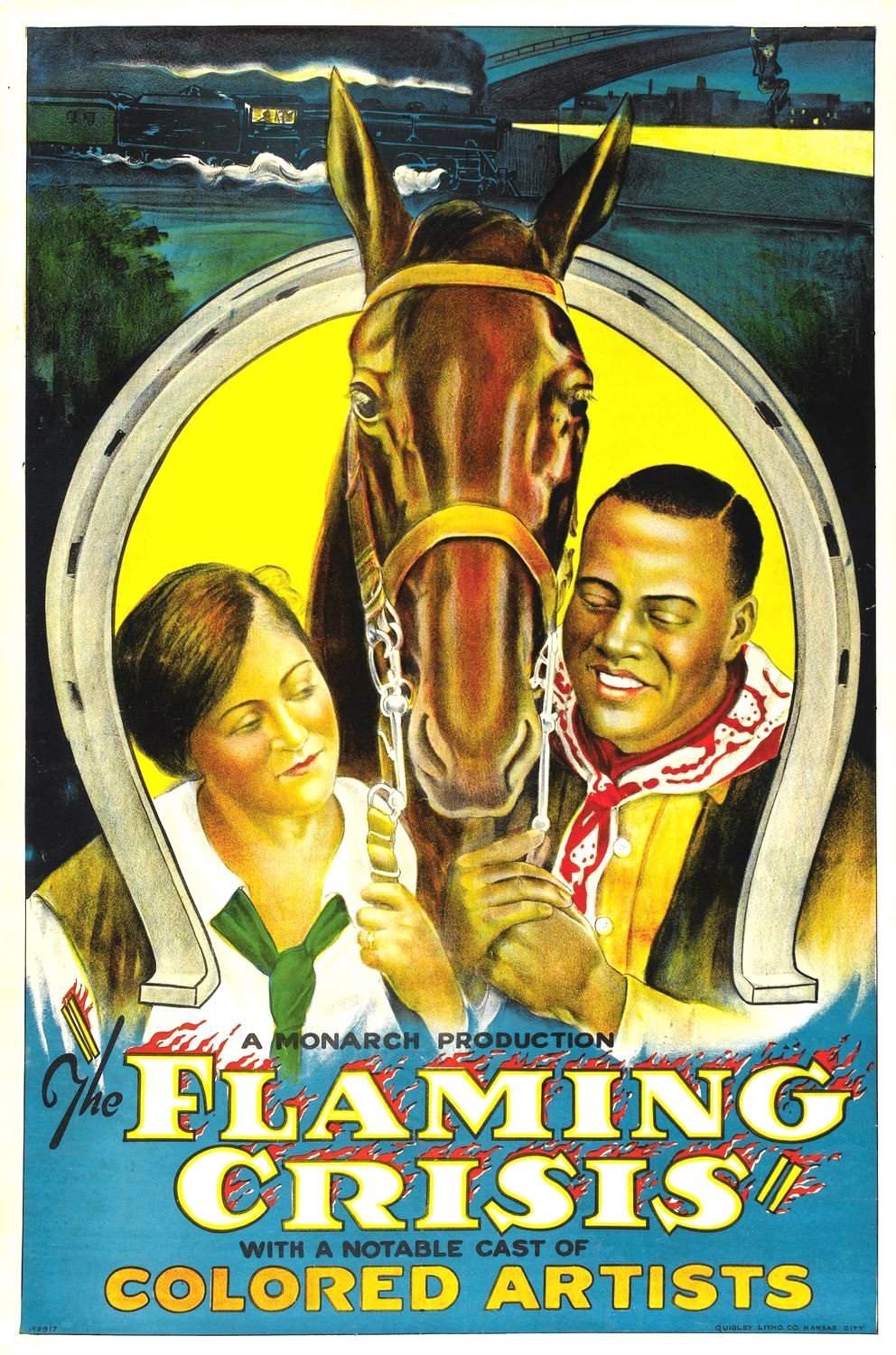
- American Theatrical Release Poster 1924
- Directed by: William H. Grimes; Leo C. Popkin
- Written by: William H. Grimes
- Produced by: Lawrence Goldman
- Starring: Calvin Nicholson; Dorothy Dunbar; Henry Dixon
- Edited by: William H. Grimes
- Distributed by: Monarch Films
- Release date: August 21, 1924
- Country: United States
- Languages: Silent; English intertitles

The Flaming Crisis is a 1924 American short silent Western film written and directed by William H. Grimes.

== Plot ==
A young black newspaperman is convicted of murder on circumstantial evidence and sentenced to prison. He escapes and makes his way to the southwestern cattle country, where he falls in love with Tex Miller, a beautiful cowgirl. Having rid the territory of an outlaw band, he gives himself up to the law, thinking that he will be sent back to prison. After discovering that the real murderer has confessed, he returns to Tex and the country he has come to love.

== Cast ==
- Calvin Nicholson as Newspaperman
- Dorothy Dunbar as Tex Miller
- Talford White
- Henry Dixon as Mark Lethler
- Kathryn Sherman
- Marie Chester
- Arther Yeargan
- William Butler
