= Vera McGinnis =

American rodeo rider

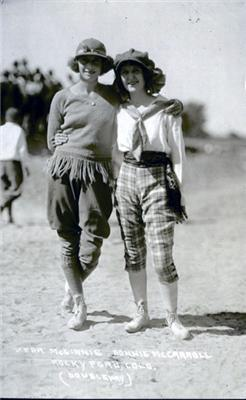
- Cowgirls Vera McGinnis and Bonnie McCarroll at Rocky Ford, Colorado, in 1919
- Born: 12 November 1892; Missouri
- Died: 23 October 1990 (aged 97)
- Occupations: Rodeo relay race, trick riding, stunt woman, and actress
- Notable work: Nobody Home (1919) and The Secret Menace (1931)

Vera McGinnis (12 November 1892 – 23 October 1990) was a champion American rodeo rider. She was inducted into the National Cowgirl Museum and Hall of Fame in 1979, and into the Rodeo Hall of Fame of the National Cowboy & Western Heritage Museum Rodeo Hall of Fame in 1985.

== Biography ==
=== Early life ===
McGinnis lived in the town she was born in Missouri, until her family moved to New Mexico when she was three. After her father died, and subsequently her mother married her uncle, they moved around from town to town for his work. Her father and stepfather encouraged McGinnis to ride. Despite all the moving around, she always had access to a horse and learned how to ride astride, instead of side saddle, as was common for women. McGinnis was almost 13 when she rode in her first competition in Norborne, Missouri.

=== Marriages ===
In 1914 McGinnis married Earl Simpson, a rodeo cowboy. According to McGinnis, "I was very happy, although I cried during the service- probably because it wasn't the way I'd always dreamed my wedding would be. Also because I felt I'd pushed Earl into taking the final step- and that wasn't the way I'd been taught it should be, either." Simpson wanted to settle on a ranch or homestead but McGinnis was able to make him agree to doing rodeos during the summer. In 1917, Simpson was drafted for the military. The military ended up turning Simpson away, but when he didn't want to follow rodeos, McGinnis went by herself. After a few years of living separate lives, McGinnis and Simpson divorced in 1921. In 1931, McGinnis married again. Her marriage to Homer Farra lasted until her death.

=== Career ===
After graduating high school at seventeen, McGinnis went to business school, and then tried her hand as a movie extra in Hollywood. She then moved to Utah where she first worked as a stenographer, and then got a job with the Salt Lake City Sight Seeing Company where to was able to interact with cowboys and cowgirls from the rodeos. After participating in her first relay race at a rodeo in Salt Lake City in 1913, she stopped wearing her long corset. She placed third overall and ended by falling and breaking some teeth, but she discovered her passion and signed a contract as a relay race rider. After moving to Winnipeg, Manitoba, McGinnis expanded her skill set and picked up trick riding. While she was getting better as a rider she faced some discrimination from other women in the field because she didn't have a ranch background, she was educated, and she experienced success in a short amount of time.

McGinnis was constantly working to earn a living. The troupe owned the horses and paid the riders a percentage of the prize if they won, based on the individual contracts. In 1917, McGinnis made her way back to Los Angeles, CA and was doing stunts for movies. She played the double for Estelle Taylor in Cimarron. She continued to compete in competitions during the summer rodeo season.

In 1922, McGinnis traveled with the Jack Burroughs Wild West Show to the Territory of Hawaii, where she broke two ribs in a bronco-busting contest in Honolulu. The following year she tied for second place in trick riding at Ringling's Madison Square Garden Rodeo in New York City. In summer 1924, she toured with Tex Austin's International Rodeo. They did two shows daily for three weeks in London's recently completed Wembley Stadium as part of the British Empire Exhibition. There she won the relay race and trick riding titles. Her European tour also included rodeos in Dublin, Paris and Brussels before she returned to New York to perform in the Madison Square Garden Rodeo again. A two-year world tour that included performances in China followed from 1925 to 1927.

McGinnis was known for her fashion sense as well. She was one of the first female riders to appear in trousers rather than a split skirt.

Her riding career came to an abrupt end on 10 June 1934 at the Livermore Rodeo in front of 20,000 spectators. Entering the second turn during the first stage of the girl's relay race, her horse fell. McGinnis was thrown against the infield rail and her horse somersaulted on top of her. She suffered a cervical fracture, five broken vertebrae, a broken right hip, three broken ribs, and a collapsed lung. Doctors told her she would never walk again. She recovered but she did not compete professionally again.

McGinnis died on 23 October 1990.

== Awards ==
In 1979, she was inducted into the National Cowgirl Museum and Hall of Fame. Induction into the National Cowboy & Western Heritage Museum Rodeo Hall of Fame followed in 1985.

== Notes and references ==
=== References ===
- Bernstein, Joel H. (2007). Wild Ride: The History and Lore of Rodeo. Gibbs Smith. ISBN 978-1-58685-745-5.
- LeCompte, Mary Lou (2000). Cowgirls of the Rodeo: Pioneer Professional Athletes. University of Illinois Press. ISBN 978-0-252-06874-4.
- McGinnis, Vera (1974). Rodeo Road: My Life As a Pioneer Cowgirl. Hastings House Daytrips Publishers. ISBN 978-0-8038-2670-0.
- Roach, Joyce Gibson (1990). The Cowgirls. University of North Texas Press. ISBN 978-0-929398-15-0.
