= Nobody Home (film) =

1919 film by Elmer Clifton

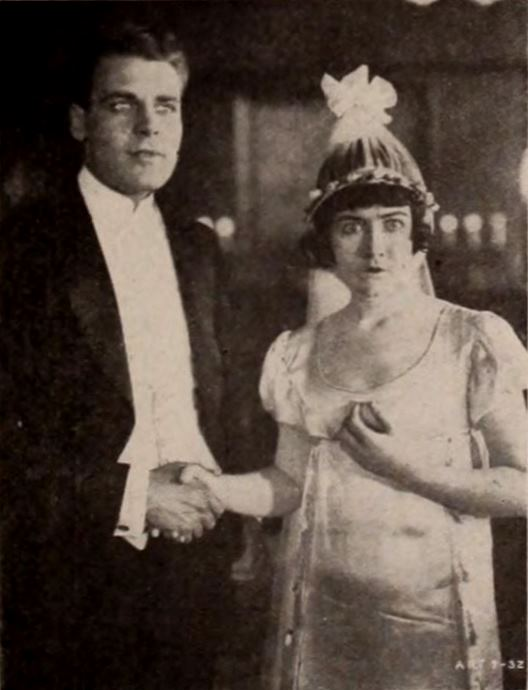
- Still with Ralph Graves and Dorothy Gish
- Directed by: Elmer Clifton
- Written by: Lois Zellner (scenario)
- Starring: Dorothy Gish; George Fawcett; Ralph Graves
- Cinematography: Lee Garmes; John Leezer
- Distributed by: Famous Players–Lasky Corp. Paramount Pictures
- Release date: August 24, 1919
- Running time: 5 reels
- Country: United States
- Language: Silent (English intertitles)

Nobody Home is a 1919 American silent comedy film starring Dorothy Gish and Ralph Graves. "Rudolph Valentine" (a pre-stardom Rudolph Valentino) had an early role. Its working title was Out of Luck. This is now considered to be a lost film.

== Plot ==
As described in a film magazine, Frances Wadsworth is a very superstitious young woman who implicitly believes in fortunes told by cards. She discovers through the cards that her friend Mollie Rourke is doomed to marry. Although Mollie's father objects, Frances aids Mollie in her elopement, and at the ceremony meets a blonde young man. As her cards have told her that a blonde man would enter her life, she accepts her new acquaintance as the gift of fate. Maurice Rennard, an adventurer, makes up his mind to marry the money attached to Frances and, after consulting her cards and finding that a dark man would cross her path, Frances submits. The wedding, however, is postponed after a black cat crosses Frances' path. Frances takes refuge in Mollie's apartment, which is vacant as Mollie and her new husband have left town. The blonde young man also takes refuge there, down at heart both by the failure to win Frances and the fact that, in order to land a contract for a farm, he will likely have to wed the silly daughter of Rockaway Smith, the man who is to let the contract. Burglars also enter the "empty" apartment. A chase from room to room takes place with not one of the occupants seeing the others. The burglars finally succeed in putting the blonde young man and Frances to sleep with a billy club and proceed to ransack the place. Mollie, Mollie's husband, and Maurice enter the flat and discover Frances and her blonde friend. The burglars are also captured. Maurice decides that Sally Smith, daughter of the man with the contract, is good enough for him, and thus relieves the blonde gentlemen of her. Frances and the blonde man set out to marry, but because it is raining postpone it, as marrying in rainy weather is bad luck.

== Cast ==
- Dorothy Gish as Frances Wadsworth
- Ralph Graves as Malcolm Dale
- Raymond Cannon as Crandall Park
- Vera McGinnis as Mollie Rourke
- George Fawcett as "Rockaway" Smith
- Emily Chichester as Sally Smith
- Rudolph Valentino as Maurice Rennard (credited as Rudolph Valentine)
- Norman McNeil as "Rosebud" Miller
- Kate Toncray as The Strong Minded Aunt
- Porter Strong as Eddie "The Pup"
- Vivian Montrose as Florence Wellington

== See also ==
- List of lost films
