= The Cowboy Cop =

1926 film

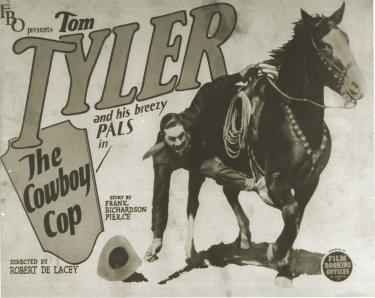
- Film poster
- Directed by: Robert De Lacey; John E. Burch (assistant)
- Written by: Frank Richardson Pierce(story); F.A.E. Pine (continuity)
- Produced by: Joseph P. Kennedy
- Starring: Tom Tyler; Jean Arthur
- Cinematography: John W. Leezer (* John Leezer)
- Distributed by: FBO
- Release date: July 11, 1926
- Running time: 5 reels
- Country: United States
- Languages: Silent; English intertitles

The Cowboy Cop is a 1926 American silent Western romance film produced by Robertson-Cole and released through Film Booking Offices of America, better known as FBO. The young female lead is played by Jean Arthur.

A copy is held at Nederlands Filmmuseum EYE Institute, Amsterdam.

== Cast ==
- Tom Tyler – Jerry McGill
- Jean Arthur – Virginia Selby
- Ervin Renard – Count Mirski
- Frankie Darro – Frankie
- Pat Harmon – Crook #1
- Earl Haley – Crook #2
