= The Definite Object =

1917 novel

- Author: Jeffrey Farnol
- Language: English
- Genre: Crime, Romance
- Publisher: Sampson Low
- Publication date: 1917
- Publication place: United Kingdom
- Media type: Print

The Definite Object is a 1917 crime romance novel by the British writer Jeffery Farnol. It was published in London by Sampson Low and in Boston by Little, Brown. A popular success in the United States, it was included on the Publisher Weekly's list of ten bestselling novels that year. Set in New York City, it features a millionaire bored with his life who pretends to be a lowlife and falls in with a gang of criminals.

== Adaptations ==
It has been adapted into films twice: a 1920 silent British film The Definite Object directed by Edgar J. Camiller and starring Ann Elliott and Manhattan a 1924 silent American film produced by Paramount Pictures starring Richard Dix and Jacqueline Logan.

== Bibliography ==
- Bryan, Pat. Farnol: The Man Who Wrote Best-Sellers. 2002.
- Goble, Alan. The Complete Index to Literary Sources in Film. Walter de Gruyter, 1999.
- Speirs, Arlene Louise. Best-selling American Fiction in the War Years, 1914-1918. University of Iowa, 1942.
- Vinson, James. Twentieth-Century Romance and Gothic Writers. Macmillan, 1982.
