= Waif of the River =

1952 novel

- Author: Jeffrey Farnol
- Language: English
- Series: Jasper Shrig
- Genre: Mystery crime
- Publisher: Sampson Low
- Publication date: 1952
- Publication place: United Kingdom
- Media type: Print
- Preceded by: The Ninth Earl

Waif of the River is a 1952 historical mystery crime novel by the British author Jeffrey Farnol. It was the final entry in his series of novels featuring Jasper Shrig, a member of the Bow Street Runners during the Regency era. He died shortly after the novel's completion.

== Synopsis ==
When a young woman is rescued from the Thames, unconscious and nearly drowned, it triggers an investigation by Shrig that uncovers a conspiracy of embezzlement and attempted murder.

== Bibliography ==
- Bryan, Pat. Farnol: The Man Who Wrote Best-Sellers. 2002.
- Hubin, Allen J. Crime Fiction, 1749-1980: A Comprehensive Bibliography. Garland Publishing, 1984.
- Vinson, James. Twentieth-Century Romance and Gothic Writers. Macmillan, 1982.
