= The Ninth Earl =

1950 novel

- Author: Jeffrey Farnol
- Language: English
- Series: Jasper Shrig
- Genre: Mystery crime
- Publisher: Sampson Low
- Publication date: 1950
- Publication place: United Kingdom
- Media type: Print
- Pages: 278
- Preceded by: Murder by Nail
- Followed by: Waif of the River

The Ninth Earl is a 1950 historical mystery crime novel by the British author Jeffrey Farnol. It was the penultimate entry into his series featuring the Regency era officer of the Bow Street Runners Jasper Shrig.

== Synopsis ==
When a storm uncovers a skeleton at Ravenhurst Castle in Sussex, it proves to be that of the long-dead seventh earl. Shrig turns up in the village to piece together the mystery in the face of the resistance of the castle's current inhabitants including the current owner the eighth earl and the attractive Lady Clytie Moor.

== Bibliography ==
- Bryan, Pat. Farnol: The Man Who Wrote Best-Sellers. 2002.
- Henderson, Lesley & Kirkpatrick, Lesley D. L. Twentieth-century Romance and Historical Writers. St. James Press, 1990
- Hubin, Allen J. Crime Fiction, 1749-1980: A Comprehensive Bibliography. Garland Publishing, 1984.
- Vinson, James. Twentieth-Century Romance and Gothic Writers. Macmillan, 1982.
