= Anino ng Kahapon =

1907 novel by Francisco Laksamana

- Author: Francisco Laksamana
- Language: Tagalog
- Genre: Novel
- Publisher: Santiago L Abillar and SP
- Publication date: 1907
- Publication place: Philippines
- Media type: Print
- Pages: 294
- ISBN: 971-550-421-3 and ISBN 9789715504218
- OCLC: 57345595

Anino ng Kahapon (literally "Shadow of Yesterday"; figuratively "Shadow of the Past") is a 1907 Tagalog-language novel written by Filipino novelist Francisco Laksamana. The 294-page novel was published in Manila by Santiago L. Abillar and SP during the first few years of American period in Philippine history. The 1907 version was illustrated by P Imperial. The novel was republished by the Ateneo de Manila University Press in 2002. According to the Ateneo de Manila University Press, the novel was written by Laksamana to help provide the readers with a "nostalgic recollection of the period of mournful Filipinoness". According to literary critic Epifanio San Juan, Jr. — apart from being a historical and political novel — Anino ng Kahapon was one of the romance novels and novels about heroic Philippine characters produced by Filipino authors from 1900 to contemporary times.

== Description ==
According to literary critic Soledad Reyes, Anino ng Kahapon is one of the few pro-American novels written during the American era (1898–1946) in the Philippines. The antagonists in the novel are Spanish authorities and their Filipino collaborators. The novel provides insight about the lifestyle of the Filipino people living in "typical small towns" located in Luzon at the time. Dedicated to the Filipino youth, Anino ng Kahapon is the first and only novel written by Laksamana about Philippine society during his lifetime. Laksama lived from 1877 to 1966. According to the National Library of the Philippines, Anino ng Kahapon was reviewed and was a master's degree thesis subject written by Pilar Pili de Guzman, entitled Isang pagsusuri sa nobelang "Anino ng Kahapon" ni Francisco Lacsamana ("A Review of the novel "Shadow of the Past" by Francisco Laksamana") in 1983 at the Araullo Lyceum, Cabanatuan City.

== Plot ==
The setting of the novel was during the final years of Spanish colonialism. The main characters of the novel are Modesto Magsikap and Elisea Liwayway. Magsikap is a vigilante who kills two suitors of Liwayway, his girlfriend. Magsikap's first crime was the killing of Sergeant Cruz, the first suitor of Liwayway. Magsikap was imprisoned for the homicide. A group of bandits invaded the town where Magsikap was imprisoned, including the jail where Magsikap was confined. Magsikap returned to his own hometown after learning about the death of his father. There Magsikap murders Lt. Rosca, the second suitor of Liwayway. Magsikap's two brothers were put in jail. To escape his pursuers and the Spanish authorities, Magsikap flees to the United States. From the United States, Magsikap continued communicating with Liwayway through letters. After five years, Magsikap returns to the Philippines. After his trip, Modesto became convinced of the "benevolent presence" of the United States in the Philippines.
