= Red Hot Hoofs =

1926 film

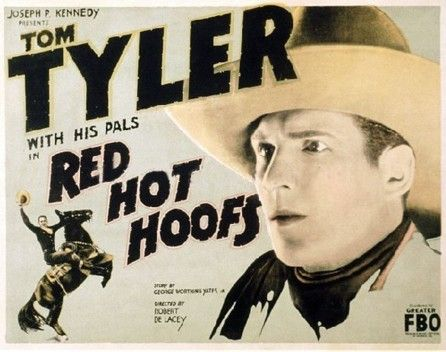
- Directed by: Robert De Lacey
- Written by: F.A.E. Pine; George Washington Yates Jr.
- Produced by: Joseph P. Kennedy
- Starring: Tom Tyler; Frankie Darro; Dorothy Dunbar
- Cinematography: John W. Leezer
- Production company: Robertson-Cole Pictures Corporation
- Distributed by: Film Booking Offices of America; Ideal Films (UK)
- Release date: December 19, 1926
- Running time: 50 minutes
- Country: United States
- Languages: Silent; English intertitles

Red Hot Hoofs is a 1926 American silent Western film directed by Robert De Lacey and starring Tom Tyler, Frankie Darro and Dorothy Dunbar.

== Cast ==
- Tom Tyler as Tom Buckley
- Frankie Darro as Frankie Buckley
- Dorothy Dunbar as Frances Morris
- Stanley Taylor as Gerald Morris
- Harry O'Connor as Jim Morris
- Al Kaufman as Battling Jack Riley
- Barney Furey as Al Skelly

== Bibliography ==
- Darby, William. Masters of Lens and Light: A Checklist of Major Cinematographers and Their Feature Films. Scarecrow Press, 1991.
