= Tarzan and the Golden Lion (film) =

1927 film

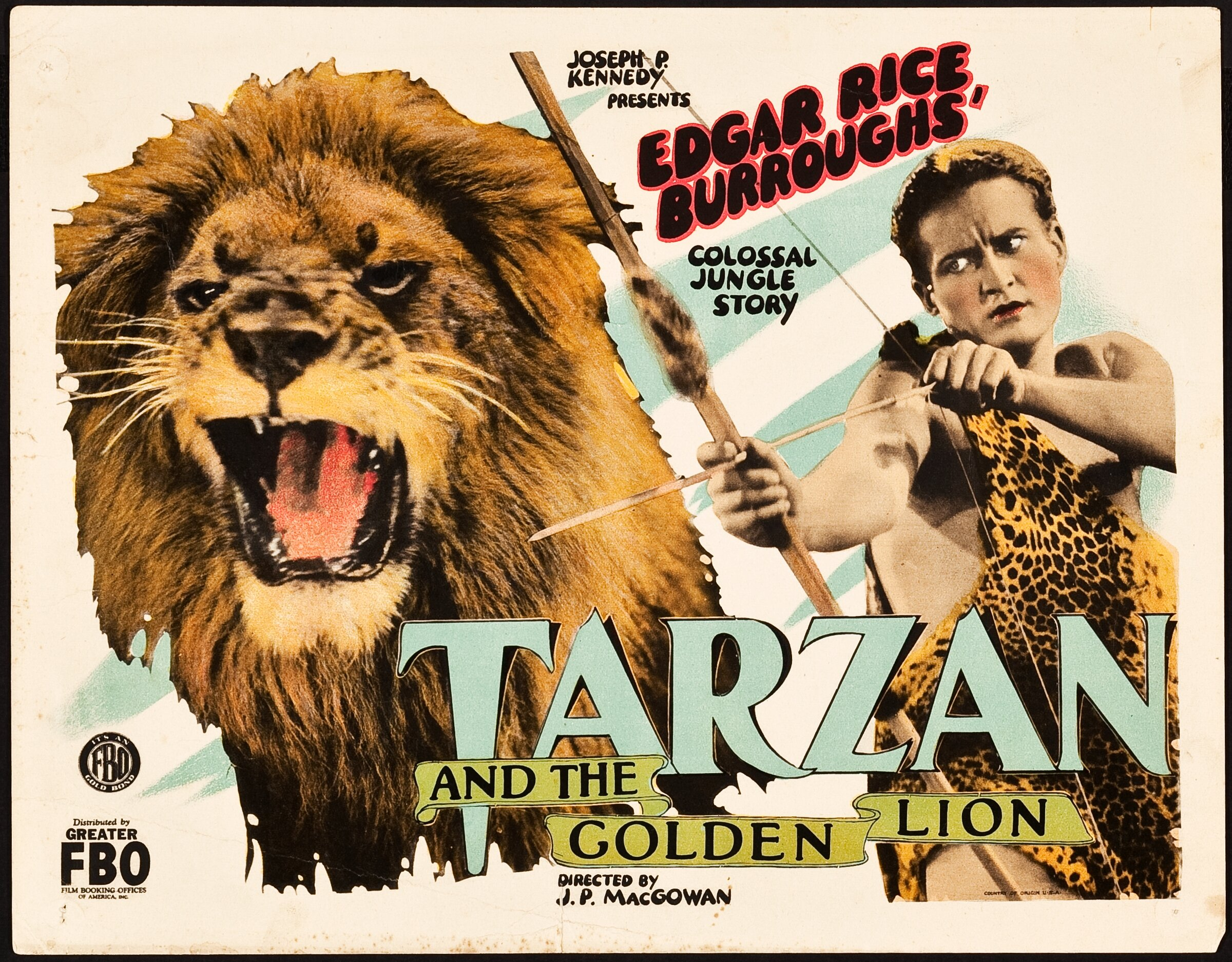
- Poster
- Directed by: J. P. McGowan
- Written by: William E. Wing
- Based on: Tarzan and the Golden Lion by Edgar Rice Burroughs
- Produced by: Edwin C. King
- Starring: James Pierce; Dorothy Dunbar; Edna Murphy
- Cinematography: Joseph Walker
- Production company: Robertson-Cole Pictures Corporation
- Distributed by: Film Booking Offices of America
- Release date: March 20, 1927
- Running time: 57 minutes
- Country: United States
- Language: Silent (English intertitles)

Tarzan and the Golden Lion (1927)

Tarzan and the Golden Lion is a 1927 American Tarzan film directed by J. P. McGowan based on the 1923 novel of the same name written by Edgar Rice Burroughs. The film stars James Pierce as Tarzan, Frederick Peters as Esteban Miranda, Dorothy Dunbar as Jane, and Edna Murphy as Betty Greystoke. It also stars Boris Karloff (in blackface) as Owaza, a tribesman. The film was distributed by the Film Booking Offices of America.

== Cast ==
- James Pierce as Tarzan
- Frederick Peters as Esteban Miranda, villain
- Edna Murphy as Betty Greystoke, Tarzan's sister
- Harold Goodwin as Jack Bradley
- Dorothy Dunbar as Jane Porter Clayton, Lady Greystoke, Tarzan's wife
- D'Arcy Corrigan as Weesimbo
- Boris Karloff as Owaza
- Robert Bolder as John Peebles

== Production ==
Tarzan and the Golden Lion was Pierce's only on-screen appearance as Tarzan. The next year, he married the daughter of Edgar Rice Burroughs, and the two went on to perform the voices of Tarzan and Jane in a Tarzan radio series from 1932 to 1936.

== Preservation status ==
Considered a lost film for many decades - with Pierce trying in vain to locate a copy before his death - a complete print of the film was discovered in the 1990s.
