= Fiorenza (play) =

Drama by Thomas Mann

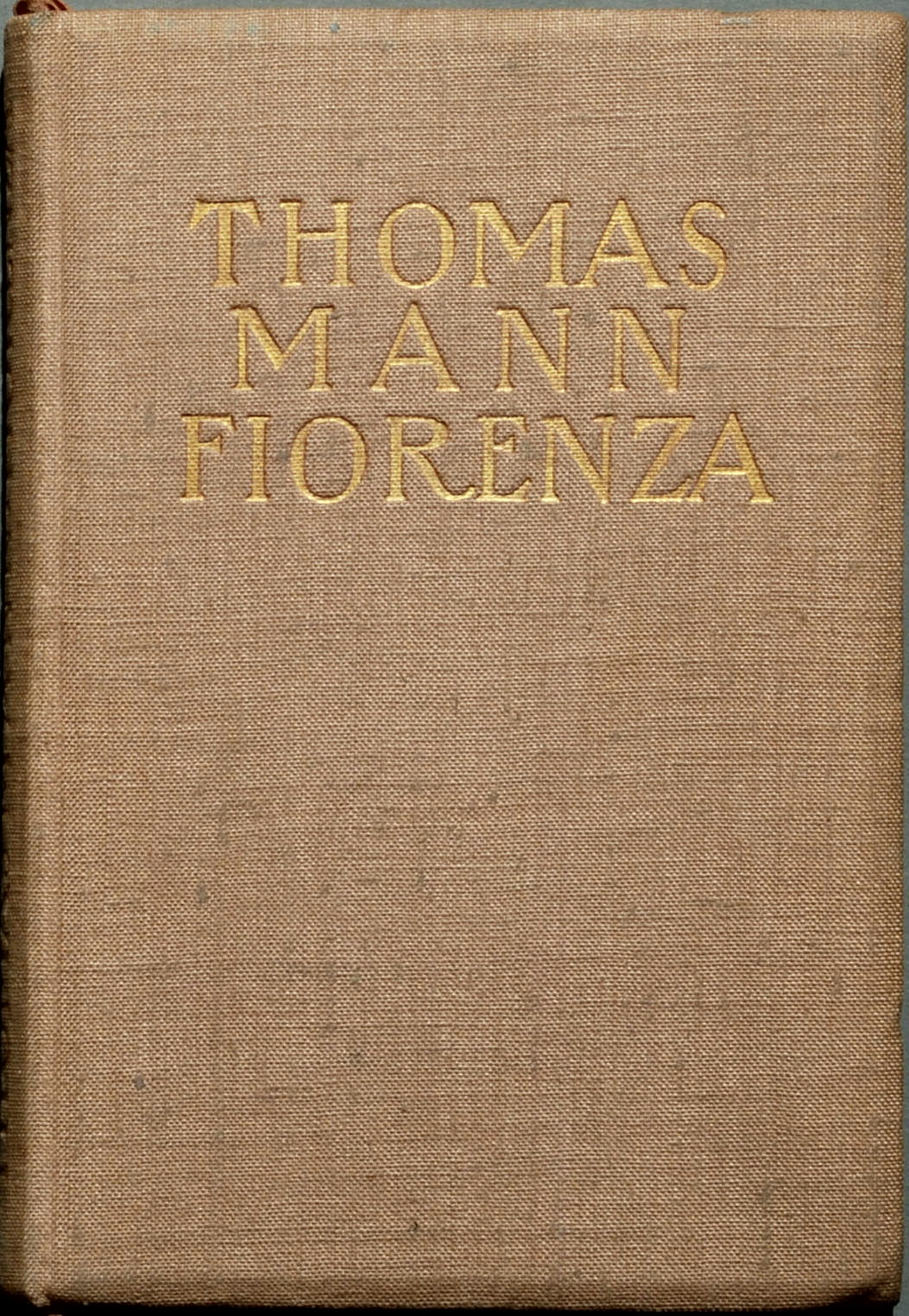
The first edition cover 1906

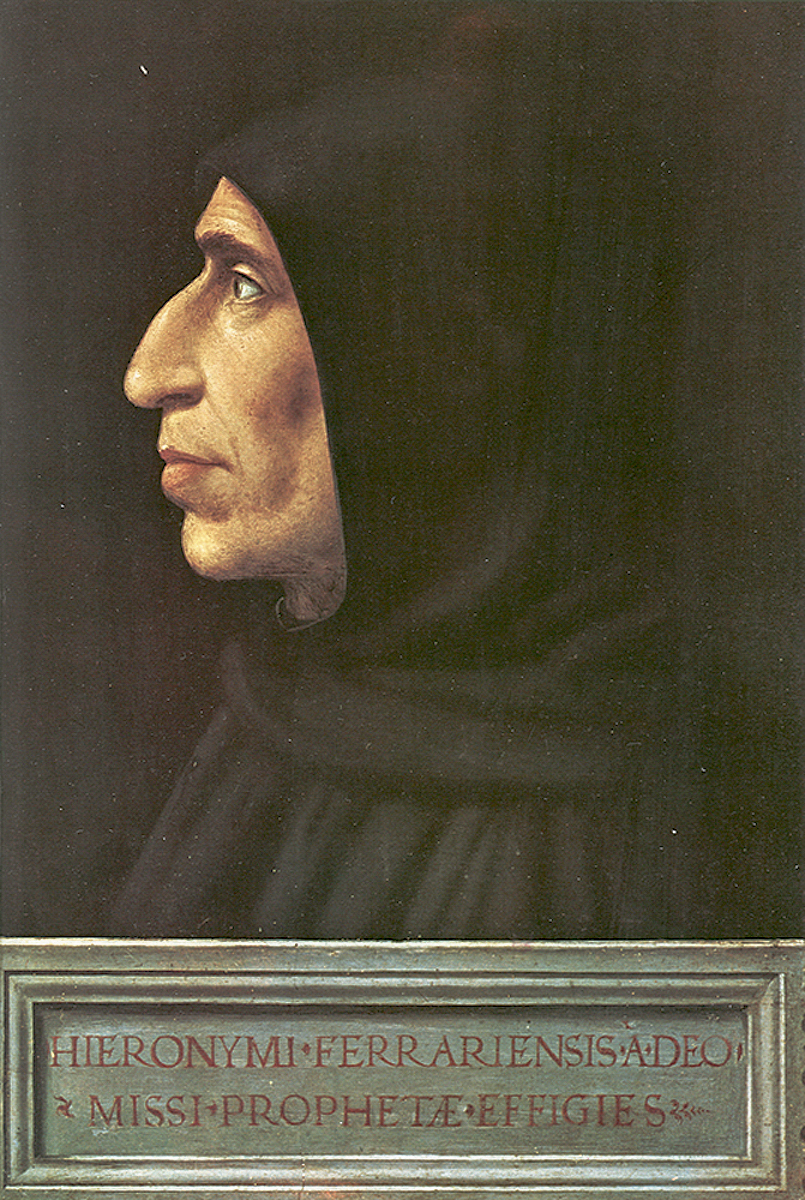
Savonarola

Fiorenza is Thomas Mann's only completed play. It premiered on 11 May 1907 at the Frankfurt Playhouse.

== Plot ==
The play takes place in 1492 in Florence. It features the eloquent preacher Girolamo Savonarola. He had once courted Fiorenza, but was rejected. Now Savonarola preaches asceticism. Fiorenza is an allegory for the city of Florence, and is the mistress of the dying Lorenzo de' Medici, the secular ruler of the city.

Fiorenza cannot escape the charismatic Savonarola, even if she had rejected him as a lover. She confronts the dying Lorenzo de' Medici with this. The art-loving, secular ruler recognizes the religious leader as an equal and calls him brother.

== Reception ==
The play was not a success in the theater. It was strongly criticized by Alfred Kerr. Other critics such as Theodor Lessing and Richard Schaukal stated the weakness of the play was the allegorical figure of Fiore Fiorenza. Mann's failure as a playwright probably brought him to the judgment that theater can be justified only as a popular entertainment.

Fiorenza had its American debut in 1961, in San Francisco.

== Text ==
- Berlin: S. Fischer, 1906, 170 pages. First Edition (Potempa E 20.2, Burgin I, 4, Wilpert / Guhring ² 6)
