= James Pierce =

American actor, football player and coach (1900–1983)

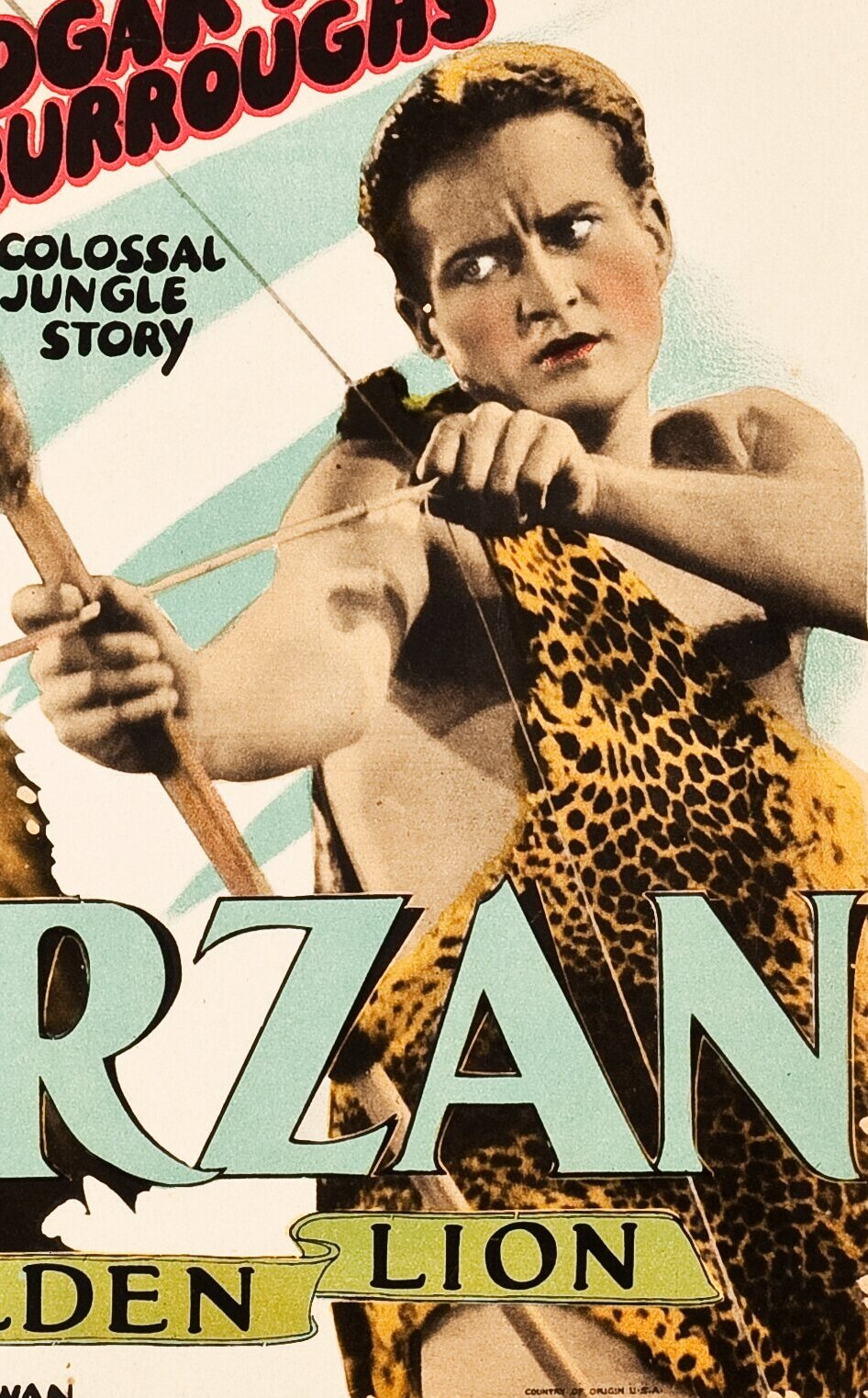
- Pierce in Tarzan and the Golden Lion (1927)
- Born: James Hubert Pierce; August 8, 1900; Freedom, Indiana, U.S.
- Died: December 11, 1983 (aged 83); Apple Valley, California, U.S.
- Resting place: Forest Hill Cemetery Shelbyville, Shelbyville, Indiana
- Education: Indiana University Bloomington
- Occupations: Actor; football player; coach
- Years active: 1932–1958
- Spouse: Joan Burroughs (m. 1928; died 1972)
- Children: 2

James Hubert Pierce (August 8, 1900 – December 11, 1983) was an American actor and the fourth actor to portray Tarzan on film. He appeared in films from 1924 to 1951.

== Background ==
Pierce was born in Freedom, Indiana. He was an All-American center on the Indiana Hoosiers football team. Following his graduation in 1921, he coached high school football in Arizona, and began acting in his spare time. After he was cast in the 1923 production of The Deerslayer, he remained in California and coached football at Glendale High School (one of his players was John Wayne).

== Career ==
=== Portrayal of Tarzan ===
Pierce's life changed when he attended a party given by Edgar Rice Burroughs and his daughter Joan. Burroughs, the creator and author of the Tarzan books, immediately wanted Pierce to star in the next Tarzan movie. Pierce gave up a role in the film Wings to accept the Tarzan role. His part in Wings was given to a newcomer named Gary Cooper. The silent Tarzan film Burroughs talked him into accepting was released in 1927 by RKO Radio Pictures, and entitled Tarzan and the Golden Lion.

=== Later career ===
Pierce played Prince Thun of the Lion Men in the 1936 serial film Flash Gordon. He acted in small roles in several films, mostly westerns, through 1951, and worked in a real estate agency in the San Fernando Valley. He was a pilot, active during World War II with the National Airmen's Reserve, the forerunner of today's Air National Guard.

== Personal life and death ==
James H. Pierce and Joan Burroughs Pierce starred in the 1932–34 Tarzan radio series

Pierce wed Joan Burroughs on August 8, 1928, his 28th birthday. From 1932 to 1936, James and Joan Pierce were the voices of Tarzan and Jane on national radio in Tarzan. They had a daughter Joanne II Anselmo, née Pierce), and a son James Michael Pierce. They remained married until Joan's death in 1972. Both are buried in Forest Hill Cemetery Shelbyville, Shelbyville, Indiana, and their tombstones bear the inscriptions Tarzan and Jane.

For many years, near the end of his life, Pierce attempted, to no avail, to find a print of Tarzan and the Golden Lion, which was thought lost. After his death, a copy was found in a foreign archive.

== Selected filmography ==
- Leatherstocking (1924, Serial) – Harry March
- Her Man (1924)
- Return of Grey Wolf (1926) – Louis LaRue
- Tarzan and the Golden Lion (1927) – Tarzan
- Wings (1927) – Army MP (uncredited)
- Jesse James (1927) – Frank James
- Her Summer Hero (1928) – Chris
- Phantom of the Range (1928) – 'Flash' Corbin
- Ladies of the Mob (1928) – Police Officer
- The Lightning Express (1930) – Griswell Henchman
- Young as You Feel (1931) – Jack, a Cop (uncredited)
- Suicide Fleet (1931) – Recruit (uncredited)
- Ladies of the Big House (1931) – Arresting Officer (uncredited)
- The Trial of Vivienne Ware (1932) – Cop (uncredited)
- Unashamed (1932) – Court Officer (uncredited)
- Horse Feathers (1932) – Ed Mullen – Darwin Player (uncredited)
- Belle of the Nineties (1934) – Admirer (uncredited)
- Goin' to Town (1935) – Cowboy (uncredited)
- The Murder Man (1935) – Sing Sing Guard (uncredited)
- The Virginia Judge (1935) – Officer Skeels
- His Fighting Blood (1935) – Dave (uncredited)
- Timber War (1935) – Henchman Charlie Braden
- Follow the Fleet (1936) – Paradise Ballroom Bouncer (uncredited)
- The Walking Dead (1936) – Prisoner (uncredited)
- Flash Gordon (1936, Serial) – Prince Thun [Chs. 2-9, 12-13]
- Our Relations (1936) – Doorman (uncredited)
- Wives Never Know (1936) – Dentist (uncredited)
- You Only Live Once (1937) – Guard (uncredited)
- Green Light (1937) – Harcourt's Chauffeur (uncredited)
- There Goes My Girl (1937) – Bit Role (uncredited)
- Life Begins in College (1937) – Coach (uncredited)
- Ali Baba Goes to Town (1937) – Captain of the Guards (uncredited)
- High Flyers (1937) – Cop (uncredited)
- Racket Busters (1938) – Martin's Henchman (uncredited)
- Charlie Chan in Honolulu (1938) – Police Officer (uncredited)
- Disbarred (1939) – Bailiff (uncredited)
- Ambush (1939) – Officer Mack McKelway (uncredited)
- Persons in Hiding (1939) – G-Man (uncredited)
- Union Pacific (1939) – Card Player (uncredited)
- Captain Fury (1939) – Guard
- These Glamour Girls (1939) – Joy Lane Bouncer (uncredited)
- Zorro's Fighting Legion (1939, Serial) – Moreno
- Emergency Squad (1940) – Policeman (uncredited)
- Strange Cargo (1940) – Guard (uncredited)
- Johnny Apollo (1940) – Guard (uncredited)
- Winners of the West (1940, Serial) – Charlie Nelson – Lumberman [Ch. 10] (uncredited)
- The Golden Trail (1940) – Miner (uncredited)
- When the Daltons Rode (1940) – Deputy Sheriff (uncredited)
- Rainbow Over the Range (1940) – Jim Rader
- Arizona Frontier (1940) – Henchman Kansas
- The Gay Caballero (1940) – Henchman (uncredited)
- North West Mounted Police (1940) – Corporal (uncredited)
- Texas Rangers Ride Again (1940) – High Boots
- Michael Shayne, Private Detective (1940) – Burly Man Downstairs (uncredited)
- Chad Hanna (1940) – Big Man (uncredited)
- Mr. & Mrs. Smith (1941) – Doorman (uncredited)
- Across the Sierras (1941) – Man on Wagon (uncredited)
- Love Crazy (1941) – San Francisco Private Investigator (uncredited)
- The Get-Away (1941) – Prison Guard (uncredited)
- Parachute Battalion (1941) – Man (uncredited)
- Roxie Hart (1942) – Policeman (uncredited)
- Nocturne (1946) – Policeman (uncredited)
- My Favorite Brunette (1947) – Detective (uncredited)
- The Farmer's Daughter (1947) – Policeman (uncredited)
- The Miracle of the Bells (1948) – Soldier in 'Joan of Arc' (uncredited)
- Big Jack (1949) – Man in Buggy (uncredited)
- Yes Sir, That's My Baby (1949) – Doctor (uncredited)
- Stars in My Crown (1950) – Townsman (uncredited)
- Black Hand (1950) – Court Bailiff (uncredited)
- The Next Voice You Hear... (1950) – Myron (uncredited)
- The Skipper Surprised His Wife (1950) – Delivery Man (uncredited)
- My Blue Heaven (1950) – Truck Driver (uncredited)
- The Killer That Stalked New York (1950) – Police Commissioner (uncredited)
- Right Cross (1950) – Moe, Bath House Attendant (uncredited)
- Undercover Girl (1950) – Lt. Kirby (uncredited)
- Inside Straight (1951) – Detective (uncredited)
- Follow the Sun (1951) – Proprietor (uncredited)
- Show Boat (1951) – Doorman (uncredited)
- Saturday's Hero (1951) – Assistant Coach (uncredited)
- Cattle Queen (1951) – Bad Bill Smith (final film role)
