= The Broad Highway =

Novel by Jeffery Farnol (1910)

The Broad Highway is a novel published in 1910 by English author Jeffery Farnol in the historical romance genre. Much of the novel is set in Sissinghurst, a small village in Kent (South East England).

It was a best-seller, and the number one selling fiction book in the United States in 1911.
