= Abdullah al-Qasemi =

Saudi Arabian writer and intellectual

- عبدالله بن علي النجدي القصيمي
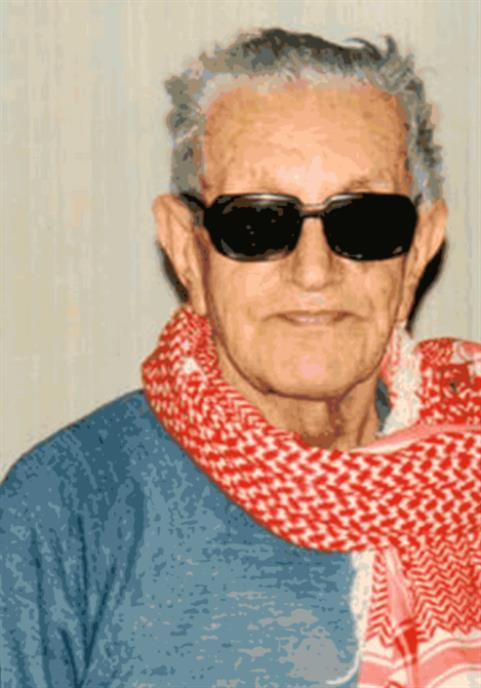
- Al-Qasemi in 1989

Personal life
- Born: Abduallah bin Ali Al-Najdi Al-Qasemi; 1907 Buraydah, Emirate of Nejd and Hasa, now Al-Qassim province
- Died: 9 January 1996 (aged 88–89) Cairo, Egypt
- Notable work(s): They Lie to See God Beautiful; Arabs Are a Sonorous Phenomenon
- Education: Al-Azhar University
- Occupation: Writer

Religious life
- Religion: Agnostic

Abdullah al-Qasemi (1907 – 9 January 1996; Arabic: عبدالله القصيمي) was a Saudi Arabian 20th-century writer. Once a prominent Salafist intellectual, he became critical of religion and was branded an atheist — pariah to much of the Arab world. His books were banned in some Arab countries and a death fatwa was issued against him for apostasy. He was subsequently targeted for assassination in Egypt and Lebanon.

== Early life and education ==
=== Early life ===
Abdullah al-Qasemi was born in 1907 in Khubb al-Hulwah, located to the west of the city of Buraidah, al-Najdiya in Saudi Arabia. A Saudi of Egyptian heritage, his father was one of the remains of the Egyptians who came with the army of Muhammad Ali Pasha to the invasion of Najd, and he who attributed himself to al-Qassim was famous for it.

=== Family ===
Abdullah al-Qasemi's father is Sheikh Ali al-Saidi, who came from Hail and settled in Khubb al-Hulwah, and was deeply religious. He did not stop what he received from religious teachings in the city of Buraidah to move to Sharjah to increase the legal sciences and trade. Abdullah al-Qasemi's mother is (according to his son, Dr. Faisal bin Abdullah al-Qasemi) the Mrs. Moudi al-Rumai Almost four years, to call her and her child a migrant to Sharjah, but she was soon associated with another man from the al-Husayni family residing in the village of al-Ap, near Khubb al-Hulwah.

Abdullah al-Qasemi is linked with a number of Najdi families, such as the family of al-Muzaini, al-Muslim, al-Husayni and al-Jamuji. The Saudi historian Abdul Rahman al-Ruwaished stated that Sheikh Ibn Kamalah, who worked for King Abdul Aziz, is the uncle of Abdullah al-Qasemi. The historian Ibrahim al-Muslim said, when asked about the extent of the link and kinship between the two families: “We gathered nearly a link and a link!” The information was published for the first time - because it was information that al-Qasemi was not disclosed about for everyone who met him from writers, journalists and researchers - as his friends say that he was not speaking with his own affairs at all, and that Sheikh Ali al-Saidi had married a woman from Sharjah and Amman and had children there, and Faisal al-Qasemi stated that he was in constant contact with his cousins in Sharjah and visited him in Riyadh constantly.

Al-Qasemi grew up between Khubb al-Hulwah and the apartment. In addition to losing the tenderness of his parents, the living conditions were poor, the combination of which may have been why he left his village at the age of ten. Dr. Faisal al-Qasemi instead believes that the uncles of Sheikh Abdullah are the ones who pushed him to leave. The livelihood, and they insisted on leaving in front of his mother's insistence, and their argument was to search for his father to feed him and apply him after they were narrowed in these bad living conditions. In Cairo, a journey of long-standing and then intellectual research, which has become one of the most prominent actors at the level of the Arab world.

In Riyadh, where al-Qasemi studied Sheikh "Saad bin Atiq", he got to know a delegation from Sharjah who came to the visit of Riyadh, and it was a coincidence that the head of the delegation is a friend of his father and knew him completely, so I walked on his horizon signs of hope in meeting his father, and this was what happened on the coast of the Gulf of Amman, but the amazement hit the boy who was looking not only to meet his father, but that the tender He used to work as a merchant in pearls and strictly in his interpretation of many teachings of the Islamic religion, which he met with some softening and cruelty and imposed on him a very cruel education method.

This dry meeting must have its subsequent impact on the life of al-Qasemi. Al-Qasemi says, describing that meeting in one of his messages that he sent to Professor Ahmed al-Sibai:

It was a cruel shock to more and further than an account, I found my father to be a religious fanatic without borders, he turned religion and religiosity into rudeness, or he turned religion and religiosity into rudeness. He came to be rude with the interpretations and reasons that religion came with and tried to appear so, and no sincere cleric and preacher sees him only as much as he finds in him frowning and rudeness ...

=== Education ===
Al-Qasemi enrolled in the Sheikh Ali al-Mahmoud School, then his father died in 1922, and he was released from those restrictions in which he was accompanied and he continued to teach him, so the merchant Sheikh Abdul Aziz al-Rashid al-Hamid, who took him with Iraq, India and Syria, admired him. He stayed with two years learning in one of the schools there is the Arabic language and the prophetic hadiths and the foundations of Islamic law, then he returned to Iraq and enrolled in the Kadhimiya school, then he went out to Damascus and then to Cairo, which witnessed the true birth of al-Qassimi.

=== Family ===
Al-Qasemi belongs to the al-Saidi family, which is a deeply struck in Najd and spread between the areas of Hail and al-Qassim, and the name came in al-Saidi; At a time when Professor Abdul Rahman al-Buthi - a historian residing in Unaizah in al-Qassim - sees that one of the grandparents of the family was working in the minds between Egypt and we find centuries ago, so he attributed to the region to which he was going traded, and this is a habit spread in many Najdi cities, and it is supported by the researcher Yaqoub al-Rashid and the historian Ibrahim al-Muslim, but he states that the family of al-Saidi in Hail and Braidah who meet in Its origins are due to the Juhayna tribe and the homeland of his father and grandparents in Yanbu al-Nakhl, but he continues, saying: "Sheikh Hamad al-Jasser discussed the issue and reached a result, which is that the origins of al-Qasemi from Najd and that one of his ancestors has traveled to Egypt and returned again to Najd, so he knew the title of al-Saidi!"

In response to a question by lawyer Abdel-Rahman, who accompanied al-Qasemi for fifty years, that al-Qasemi must have spoken to him on this issue during this long time period, he said: “Never happened that Sheikh Abdullah spoke to me on this issue and no other, because he always refused to talk about all his personal issues!”.

== Career ==
=== Salafi Philosophy ===
Al-Qasemi studied at the Al-Azhar University in Cairo in 1927, but he was soon expelled because of his book The Najdi Lightning Sweeping al-Dajwi's Darkness (Arabic: البروق النجدية في اكتساح الظلمات الدجوية), which he had written in response to an article by Al-Azhar scholar Youssef al-Dajwi (Arabic: يوسف الدجوي), entitled "The litigiousness and ignorance of Wahhabists" published in the journal Nour Al-Islam in 1931. Subsequently, Abdullah al-Qasemi wrote several books attacking the scholars of Al-Azhar.

=== Free Philosophy ===
After his expulsion from al-Azhar, al-Qasemi changed his way of thinking, defending secularism and skepticism and criticizing religion to the point where his opponents labelled him "atheist". His most important books written after his rejection of Salafi ideology are These are the Cuffs, They Lie to See God Beautiful, and Arabs are a Sonorous Phenomenon. He survived two assassination attempts in Egypt and Lebanon and suffered imprisonment in Egypt under instigation from the Yemeni government, because of his great influence on Yemeni students who, because of their frequent meetings with him, were deeply influenced by his thoughts. Such influence was perceived by the Yemeni government as negative and not suitable to Islam.

== Attempted Assassination and Death ==
=== Assassination attempts ===
The first attempt to assassinate al-Qasemi occurred in 1947, the year that followed the release of his controversial book These are the Cuffs. Al-Qasemi says about the assassination attempt:

“It was in my diary in the evening to hesitate to a café near my house, and once I saw a young man in the Arab Najdi costume sitting in a corner of it. He drew my attention, so I called and sat together and started talking to him. I asked him from your Arab body and your dialect. So I asked him again, did you come in a trade, he said: No, I said: Did you come to study, and he answered in the negative. He was a young man from his body and his conversation seemed to have a legal knowledge and an educated style .. I dared him, and I told him why are you in Cairo? He hesitated somewhat, but he might have begun to trust his interlocutor, and he said: I came looking for a person named Abdullah al-Qasemi and I learned that he lives close to here. I asked him and what do you want from him? He answered: He wrote a book that brings it out of Islam, and we have been fascinated by a heretic that is permissible to kill him, and whoever does, he will receive the great reward. I asked him, did you know him? He said: No, did you sit to him? Do they influence themselves on themselves?

After several days, al-Qasemi revealed to him his personality and apologized for what he had done.

=== Possible Re-conversion ===
Some have reported that al-Qasemi had returned to Islam at the end of his life and was working on reciting the Qur’an. His friend Ibrahim Abdel Rahman confirmed in an interview with Al-Arabiya.net that he was reading the Qur’an at the end of his life on October 1, 2016, but he confirmed in a later dialogue with the program (in the photo) in 2022 that Al-Qasemi did not retract his ideas before his death at all.

On the other hand, the writer Abdullah al-Qafari quoted in his articles entitled for fifty years with al-Qasemi, in Al-Riyadh newspaper, he said:

“I finally asked him: There are those who promoted the idea of transforming al-Qasemi in the last days of his life while he was on his deathbed, and you are close to him until those last hours in Palestine Hospital where he bid farewell to life?! He told me: This is a beautiful lie, some promoted to pass the name al-Qasemi on the pages of newspapers, at a time when writing about al-Qasemi was a problem in itself, Abdullah al-Qasemi has decided from an early age of his options, it was a beautiful lie that appeals to those looking for the idea of the returning repentance, but it is not the truth at all !!".

However, Elaf electronic magazine conducted an interview with Mrs. Amal Othman, the administrative official for the elderly department in the Palestine Hospital in Heliopolis, in which the thinker al-Qasemi was dealt with and he spent his love, and I asked her about Al-Qasemi and said: "Uncle Abdullah al-Qasemi was a man like honey! He was a respectful good that addresses us the workers who serve him in a sophisticated, poetic language, and he used to make a lot of joke with us, and caress us with his kind words, and he used to tell me, that if you walk, then the earth calls you, and he was calling for us success, and we advised a lot to live in peace and harmony, and to raise the minor and grudges, and he said to us: that God is watching us from above The envy." Mrs. Amal added: "Sheikh Abdullah entered the hospital on 12/12/1995 and did not go out until 9/1/1996 a day that God died." In response to the question of Elaf magazine about how the thinker was spending his time if he did not have visitors, she said:"He was spending his time reading the Holy Qur'an, who was beside him throughout his stay in the hospital Sitilization !!" She added that Dr. Nadia Abdel Wahab, head of the department, was sitting at him sometimes and talking about many intellectual matters.

Also, the testimony of Ould al-Qasemi, Dr. Muhammad bin Abdullah al-Qasemi, who states that his father spent his last days in Palestine Hospital reads most of the time and also from the same source, which is the Elaf magazine. The two narratives are conflicting about his return from his atheism. Between the narration of his friend, the lawyer and the narration of Mrs. Amal Othman, the administrative official of the elderly department at Palestine Hospital in Heliopolis, which confirmed that he was reading the Qur’an, it is not possible to confirm and assert about the doctrinal end of the thinker Abdullah al-Qasemi.

=== Death ===
He was hospitalized at the Ain-Shams hospital in Cairo on 12 December 1995 and died of cancer on 9 January 1996, and according to his will, he was buried along with his wife in the "Bab Al-Wazir" cemetery in Egypt.

== Works ==
=== Books ===
Abdullah Al-Qasemi's works have rarely been translated. The following is a non-exhaustive list:

- The Najdi lightning Sweeping Al-Dajwi's Darkness, which is a response to Sheikh Youssef Al-Dajwi. (Arabic: البروق النجدية في اكتساح الظلمات الدجوية)
- Al-Azhar sheikhs and increase in Islam, which is also a response to Al-Dajwi. (Arabic: شيوخ الأزهر والزيادة في الإسلام)
- The decisive chapter between the Wahhabis and their violators, (Arabic: الفصل الحاسم بين الوهّابيين ومخالفيهم)
- Problems of prophetic hadiths and their statement, (Arabic: مشكلات الأحاديث النبوية وبيانها)
- Criticism of the book of Muhammad's life for Heikel, (Arabic: نقد كتاب حياة محمد لهيكل)
- The Universe Tries God (Arabic: الكون يحاكم الإله)
- The Pride of History Is in Crisis (Arabic: كبرياء التاريخ في مأزق)
- The Wahhabist Revolution (Arabic: الثورة الوهابية)
- What Is This Universe's Conscience? (Arabic: هذا الكون ما ضميره)
- These are the Cuffs (Arabic: هذي هي الأغلال)
- They Lie to See God Beautiful (Arabic: يكذبون كي يروا الإله جميلا)
- Arabs Are a Sonorous Phenomenon (Arabic: العرب ظاهرة صوتية)
- Humans Disobey to Build Civilizations (Arabic: الانسان يعصي؛ لهذا يصنع الحضارات)
- O Reason! Who Saw You? (Arabic: أيها العقل من رآك)
- The Conflict Between Islam and Idolatry (Arabic: الصراع بين الإسلام والوثنية)
- Pharaoh Writes the Book of Exodus (Arabic: فرعون يكتب سفر الخروج)
- In Order That Harun al-Rashid Does Not Come Back (Arabic: لئلا يعود هارون الرشيد)

=== Quotes ===
- Men find their religions as they find their homelands, their lands, their homes and their fathers. They just find them, they do not search for them, do not understand them, do not choose them either.
- Religions triumph in the battles they avoid, they don't fight against reason nor through reason. They never go in free fights against reason. And that is why they are triumphant.
- Man does not want the knowledge that would hurt his will. He prefers to be silly but happy than intelligent and poor.
- Whoever commits suicide with or without an idea, is nobler and more courageous than any martyr in any war.
- We wanted, then imagined, we believed, and in the end, we were convinced.
- Those who do not know how to smile finally institutionalize tears and call to consider this as an adoration.
- The occupation of our brains by gods is the worst form of occupation.
- What is the nature of the creator who forces his creatures to need misery, pollution, sadness. To be in the end a happy creature.

== See also ==
- Ibn Taymiyya
- Salman Rushdie
