= The Amateur Gentleman =

Novel by Jeffery Farnol (1913)

- Author: Jeffery Farnol
- Language: English
- Genre: Novel
- Publication date: 1913
- Publication place: United Kingdom
- Media type: Print

The Amateur Gentleman is a novel by Jeffery Farnol, published in 1913. It was made into a silent film in 1920 and again in 1926 and a talking film in 1936 with Douglas Fairbanks, Jr. starring as the protagonist, Barnabas Barty.

== Plot summary ==
The novel tells the story of Barnabas Barty, the son of John Barty, the former boxing champion of England and landlord of a pub in Kent. At the start of the tale, Barnabas comes fortuitously into the possession of a vast fortune – £700,000, an astronomical amount by Regency standards – and determines to use this fortune to become a gentleman. His father objects to this plan and they quarrel. They settle their differences in a round of fisticuffs, which Barnabas wins. Barnabas sets off for London to further his ambitions and, on the way there, contrives to make a number of influential friends and enemies.

== Bibliography ==
- The Amateur Gentleman: a Romance
- Author: Jeffery Farnol
- Editor: Low, Marston, 1913
- 599 pages
