= My Lady Caprice =

1907 novel

- First edition (US)
- Author: Jeffrey Farnol
- Language: English
- Genre: Romance
- Publisher: Dodd, Mead & Co. (US)
- Publication date: 1907
- Publication place: United Kingdom
- Media type: Print

My Lady Caprice is a 1907 romance novel by the British writer Jeffrey Farnol. A romantic drama set during the ongoing Edwardian era rather than the Regency period which he became best known for portraying, it was his debut novel. It was later republished under the alternative title Chronicles of the Imp, the title by which it had originally been serialised.

== Bibliography ==
- Bryan, Pat. Farnol: The Man Who Wrote Best-Sellers. 2002.
- Vinson, James. Twentieth-Century Romance and Gothic Writers. Macmillan, 1982.
