= Jacob Hiegentlich =

Dutch poet

Jacob Hiegentlich (30 April 1907 – 18 May 1940) was a gay Dutch poet of Jewish descent. He committed suicide in 1940, at age 33, days after the German invasion of the Netherlands.

== Biography ==
Hiegentlich was born on 30 April 1907 in Roermond, one of five children of Rosalie Egger (d. 1927) and Sallie Hiegentlich, a trader in textiles. Four of the children and the father did not survive World War II. Jacob grew up in the Catholic city of Roermond in what he later called "a confusing mix of Roman Catholicism and Jewishness". He attended gymnasium at the Bishop's College Roermond, but did not graduate—he had problems with math. Jews in Limburg did not suffer the same antisemitism as Jews in other parts of Europe. Still, while they were nominally granted the same rights as non-Jews, they were nonetheless marked as different, insulted, and ostracized; Hiegentlich sketches their position in the partly autobiographical novella Mirjam.

He wrote and published his first novel at age 17, under the pseudonym David Jozua de Castro; Het zotte vleesch. Roman van 't Limburgse volk ("The foolish flesh: novel of the people of Limburg") featured an unflattering portrait of a friend of his father, who bought up the entire printing. At his father's insistence he got a degree in Dutch in Amsterdam, graduating on 17 November 1930. In that city he was a member of the Nederlandse Zionistische Studenten-Organisatie (NZSO), and hung out with artists and bohemians, in a group named the Reynderskring for a café on the Leidseplein.

In 1932 he got a job as a teacher at a theosophical lyceum in Naarden, but his strong individualism did not go together well with the classical system of education, and after 1935 he devoted himself exclusively to being a writer. He remained an enthusiastic Zionist, and opted for the militant branch led by Ze'ev Jabotinsky. He wrote for Jewish and Zionist magazines, including Baderech, Hatikwah (the official publication of the NZSO), and Ha'Ischa. For the Joodsche Wachter, the official publication of the Dutch Zionist Union, he wrote political articles that warned against the coming of Nazism. He also wrote book reviews, greatly admiring Jacob Israël de Haan and Carry van Bruggen. He lectured on literature and Judaism, and published novels, novellas, essays, and poetry.

The outbreak of World War II proved lethal to a generation of Dutch writers—some were killed, some killed themselves, some died as a result of wartime accidents; Hiegentlich was one of many. On the evening of 14 May 1940 he took poison, and was taken, unconscious, to the Wilhelmina Gasthuis, where he died on 18 May, at age 33.

== Literary works ==
Hiegentlich's early work covers the period until 1930, when he was 23. It includes a collection of German poems, Die rote Nacht ("The red night", 1923), the novel Het zotte vleesch ("The foolish flesh", 1925), a play, Gaat u zitten ("Please sit down", produced in 1927), and an anthology of Louis Couperus, Werk van Louis Couperus (1929), an author he greatly admired.

His early (German) poetry is described as "typical puberty poetry of a precocious boy", reminiscent of Willem Kloos and Heinrich Heine. His best and best-known poems are "Kerstmis aan de bar" ("Christmas in the bar", published in Elsevier in 1935), a poem about people who appear to be enjoying life but are tortured by hidden grief, and "Sonnet", published in Helikon (1932), a poem inspired by Death in Venice's Tadzio.

In 1935 he published a short story collection, Het vochtige park ("The wet park", Maastricht, A.A.M. Stols, 1935). Stories of his were also published in De Nieuwe Gids, Nederland, and De Stem, but by 1949 they had not been collected and published separately. During the period 1930–1940 he wrote a number of novels touching on the threats posed by the Nazis, by antisemitism, and by Dutch nationalism. Onbewoonbare wereld ("Uninhabitable world", 1937), is a psychological novel whose main character is the son of the editor of the National Socialist Movement in the Netherlands (NSB) magazine; he plans to kill his father for spreading antisemitic ideas, but ends up killing himself—a suicide which the NSB exploits for its own purposes. The world of the novel has become "uninhabitable" for any person of sensibility. The main character of Schipbreuk te Luik ("Shipwreck in Liège", 1938), Alex Moser, resembles Hiegentlich in many ways, having been brought up a Jew in Limburg and becoming estranged from Germany because of Nazism. Met de stroom mee ("With the current") was published posthumously in 1946, and follows the life of an actor, Lode Wolff, a talented but coldhearted man who ends up as an agent for the Gestapo in Flanders. One more novel, preserved in manuscript, is Taboe ("Taboo"), whose main character, Emile Moser, is a thinly veiled version of the author.

== Legacy ==
He is remembered with a plaque at his brother's house, on Markt 27 in Roermond.

An anthology of his work with an extensive biography was edited by Dr. Catharina Ypes, and published as 1907–1940. Een joods artist tussen twee oorlogen by L.J. Veen, Amsterdam, in 1949. He makes an appearance in the novel Sunken Red by Jeroen Brouwers, who also devoted a chapter to him in his De laatste deur ("The last door"), a study of Dutch writers who committed suicide.

== See also ==
- History of the Jews in the Netherlands
