= The Masquerade Bandit =

1926 film

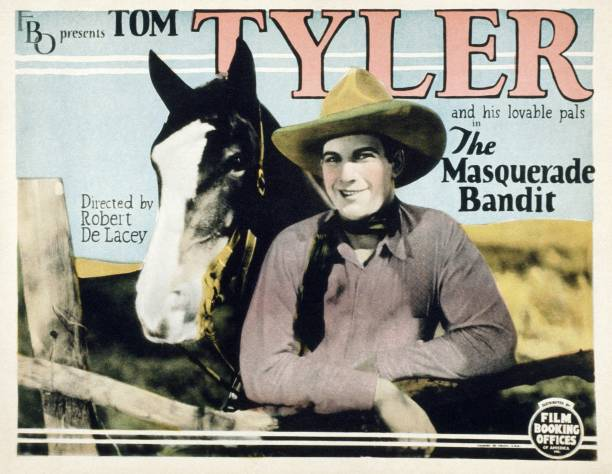
- Directed by: Robert De Lacey
- Written by: Ethel Hill; Enid Hibbard; William E. Wing
- Starring: Tom Tyler; Dorothy Dunbar; Ethan Laidlaw
- Cinematography: John W. Leezer
- Production company: Robertson-Cole Pictures Corporation
- Distributed by: Film Booking Offices of America
- Release date: May 30, 1926
- Running time: 50 minutes
- Country: United States
- Languages: Silent; English intertitles

The Masquerade Bandit is a 1926 American silent Western film directed by Robert De Lacey and starring Tom Tyler, Dorothy Dunbar and Ethan Laidlaw.

== Cast ==
- Tom Tyler as Jeff Morton
- Dorothy Dunbar as Molly Marble
- Ethan Laidlaw as Duncan
- Alfred Hewston as Pat
- Ray Childs as Spike
- Raye Hampton as Kate Mahoney
- Earl Haley as Tony
- Frankie Darro as Tim Marble

== Bibliography ==
- Munden, Kenneth White. The American Film Institute Catalog of Motion Pictures Produced in the United States, Part 1. University of California Press, 1997.
