= Jeffery Farnol =

British writer (1878–1952)

John Jeffery Farnol
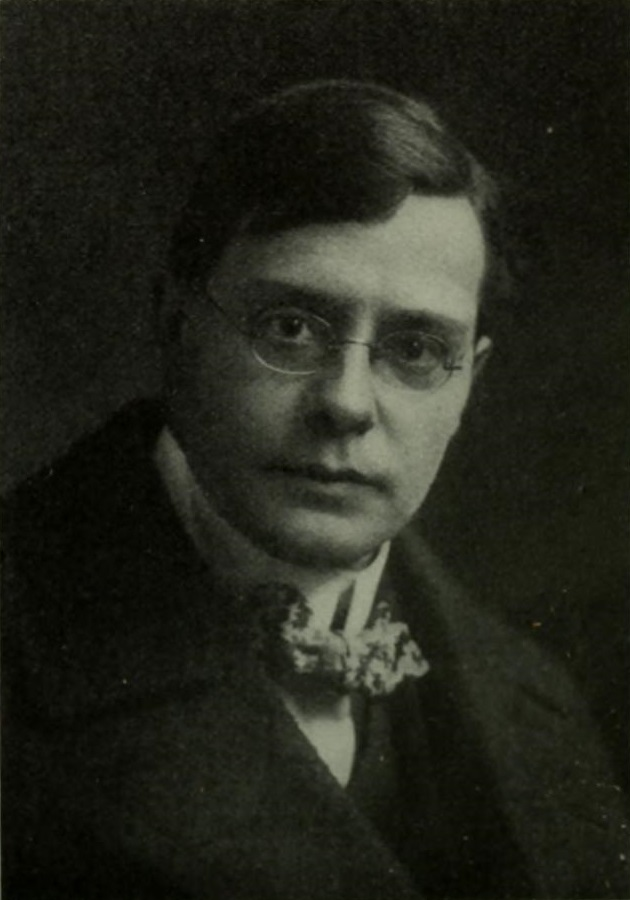
- Born: 10 February 1878; Aston, Birmingham, England
- Died: 9 August 1952 (aged 74); Eastbourne, England
- Occupation: writer
- Spouse(s): Blanche Wilhelmina Victoria Hawley (1900–1938), Phyllis Mary Clarke (1938–1952)
- Children: 2
- Writing career
- Pen name: Jeffery Farnol
- Language: English
- Period: 1907–1952
- Genre: Romance

Jeffery Farnol (10 February 1878 – 9 August 1952) was a British writer from 1907 until his death in 1952, known for writing more than 40 romance novels, often set in the Georgian Era or English Regency period, and swashbucklers. He, with Georgette Heyer, largely initiated the Regency romantic genre.

== Biography ==
=== Personal life ===
John Jeffery Farnol was born in Aston, Birmingham, UK, the son of Henry John Farnol, a factory-employed brass-founder, and Kate Jeffery. He had two brothers and a sister. His childhood was spent in London and Kent. He attended the Westminster School of Art after losing his job with a Birmingham metal-working company.

In 1900, he married Blanche Wilhelmina Victoria Hawley (1883–1955), the 16-year-old daughter of noted New York scenic artist H. Hughson Hawley. They relocated to the United States, where he found work as a scene painter. They had a daughter Gillian Hawley. He returned to England about 1910, and settled in Eastbourne, Sussex. During 1938, he divorced Blanche and married Phyllis Mary Clarke on 20 May, and adopted her daughter Charmian Jane. His nephew was Ewart Oakeshott, the British illustrator, collector, and amateur historian, who wrote on medieval arms and armour.

Farnol died on 9 August 1952 at age 74 in Eastbourne after a long struggle with cancer.

=== Writing career ===
Farnol published his first romance novel, My Lady Caprice, in 1907. The success of his early novels led Farnol to become a professional writer. He produced about 40 novels and volumes of stories, and some non-fiction and children's books. His last book was completed by his second wife Phyllis.

This moderate success was followed by The Broad Highway, a publishing sensation which became the best-selling book of 1911 in the world.

Farnol wrote a series of mysteries featuring Georgian policeman Jasper Shrig.

Two of his early books, The Amateur Gentleman and The Broad Highway, have been issued in a version edited by romance novelist Barbara Cartland. The Amateur Gentleman was adapted for British cinema in 1920 and 1936, and for American cinema in 1926.

== Bibliography ==
=== Single novels ===
- My Lady Caprice (1907) [Later issued as "Chronicles of the Imp"]
- The Broad Highway (1910)
- The Money Moon (1911)
- Fortune's Fool (1912)
- The Honourable Mr. Tawnish (1913)
- Beltane the Smith (1915)
- The Definite Object (1917)
- Our Admirable Betty (1918)
- The Geste of Duke Jocelyn (1919)
- Sir John Dering (1923)
- Gyfford of Weare (1928)
- The Shadow (1929)
- Another Day (1929)
- Over the Hills (1930)
- The Jade of Destiny (1931)
- Charmian Lady Vibart (1932)
- Voices from the Dust (1932)
- The Way Beyond (1933)
- Winds of Fortune (1934)
- John o'the Green (1935)
- Portrait of a Gentleman in Colours (1935)
- A Pageant of Victory (1936)
- A Book for Jane (1937)
- The Crooked Furrow (1937) (Trilogy with The Happy Harvest & Waif of the River)
- The Lonely Road (1938)
- A New Book for Jane (1939)
- Adam Penfeather, Buccaneer (1940)
- A Matter of Business and other stories (1940)
- The King Liveth (1943)
- The Piping Times (1945)
- Heritage Perilous (1946)
- My Lord of Wrybourne (1948) [US Title: Most Sacred of All] Sequel to Heritage Perilous
- The Fool Beloved (1949)
- The Glad Summer (1951)
- Justice by Midnight (1955)

=== Treasure and Vengeance Series ===
1. Black Bartlemy's Treasure (1920)
2. Martin Conisby's Vengeance (1921)

=== Jasper Shrig Series ===
1. The Amateur Gentleman (1913)
2. Peregrine's Progress (1922)
3. The Loring Mystery (1925)
4. High Adventure (1926)
5. The Quest of Youth (1927)
6. The Way Beyond (1933)
7. The Happy Harvest (1939)
8. Murder by Nail (1942) [US Title: Valley of the Night]
9. The Ninth Earl (1950)
10. Waif of the River (1952)

=== Omnibus collections ===
- The Shadow, and Other Stories (1929)
- Voices from the Dust (1932)
- A Matter of Business (1940)

=== Non fiction ===
- Some War Impressions (1918)
- Great Britain at War (1918)
- Famous Prize Fights or Epics of the Fancy (1928)

== Film adaptations ==
- The Amateur Gentleman, directed by Maurice Elvey (UK, 1920, based on the novel The Amateur Gentleman)
- The Definite Object, directed by Edgar J. Camiller (UK, 1920, based on the novel The Definite Object)
- The Money Moon, directed by Fred Paul (UK, 1920, based on the novel The Money Moon)
- Manhattan, directed by R. H. Burnside (1924, based on the novel The Definite Object)
- The Amateur Gentleman, directed by Sidney Olcott (1926, based on the novel The Amateur Gentleman)
- The Amateur Gentleman, directed by Thornton Freeland (UK, 1936, based on the novel The Amateur Gentleman)
