= The Amateur Gentleman (1920 film) =

1920 film by Maurice Elvey

- Directed by: Maurice Elvey
- Written by: Jeffery Farnol
- Produced by: Stoll Pictures
- Starring: Langhorn Burton, Madge Stuart and Cecil Humphreys
- Release date: March 1920
- Country: United Kingdom

The Amateur Gentleman is a 1920 British drama film directed by Maurice Elvey and starring Langhorn Burton, Madge Stuart and Cecil Humphreys. The film is adapted from the 1913 novel The Amateur Gentleman by Jeffery Farnol.

Story filmed again in 1926 as The Amateur Gentleman starring Richard Barthelmess and in 1936 as The Amateur Gentleman starring Douglas Fairbanks Jr.

== Premise ==
In Regency Britain a young man tries to establish his father's innocence of an accused crime, by travelling to London disguised as a gentleman.

== Cast ==
- Langhorn Burton as Barnabas Barty
- Madge Stuart as Lady Cleone Meredith
- Cecil Humphreys as Wilfred Chichester
- Herbert Synott as John Barty
- Pardoe Woodman as Ronald Barrymaine
- Alfred Paumier as Prince Regent
- Gerald McCarthy as Viscount Horatio Debenham
- Geoffrey Wilmer as Captain Slingsby
- Sydney Seaward as Sir Mortimer Carnaby
- E. Vivian Reynolds as Jasper Gaunt
- Dalton Somers as Natty Bell
- Teddy Arundell as Digby Smivvle
- Will Corrie as Captain Chumley
- Judd Green as Jerry the Bosun
