= The Amateur Gentleman (1936 film) =

1936 British film by Thornton Freeland

- Directed by: Thornton Freeland
- Written by: Clemence Dane; Edward Knoblock; Sergei Nolbandov
- Based on: The Amateur Gentleman by Jeffery Farnol
- Produced by: Marcel Hellman; Douglas Fairbanks Jr.
- Starring: Douglas Fairbanks Jr.; Elissa Landi; Gordon Harker; Margaret Lockwood
- Cinematography: Günther Krampf
- Edited by: Conrad von Molo
- Music by: Richard Addinsell; Walter Goehr
- Production company: Criterion Films
- Distributed by: United Artists
- Release date: 20 January 1936
- Running time: 102 minutes
- Country: United Kingdom
- Language: English

The Amateur Gentleman is a 1936 British drama film directed by Thornton Freeland and starring Douglas Fairbanks Jr., Elissa Landi, Gordon Harker and Margaret Lockwood, with music by Richard Addinsell. It was written by Clemence Dane, Edward Knoblock and Sergei Nolbandov based on the 1913 novel The Amateur Gentleman by Jeffery Farnol. In an effort to prove his father's innocence of a charge of stealing, a young man disguises himself as a gentleman and travels to Regency London.

It was made at Elstree Studios with sets designed by Edward Carrick. The story was previously filmed in the silent era in Britain The Amateur Gentleman and in Hollywood as The Amateur Gentleman 1926 with Richard Barthelmess.

== Plot ==
Innkeeper and ex-boxer John Barty is bent on making his son Barnabas a gentleman, but has his doubts after he finds out that the younger Barty is appalled when a man is hanged for stealing a mere five shillings. Then some aristocrats arrive at the inn. Barnabas is entranced by the beautiful Lady Cleone Meredith. She is engaged to Louis Chichester, who does not conceal from her the fact that he is marrying her for her wealth. Also in the party is the equally poverty-stricken Pauline Darville, the woman Chichester had romanced before Cleone.

As Cleone's grandfather, the Marquess of Comberhurst, prepares for bed, he gives John Barty a valuable string of pearls to put away for safekeeping. This is seen by Chichester. That night, the Marquess is robbed. Chichester accuses the innkeeper. Some of the stolen items are found in John Barty's possession, though not the pearls, and the unfortunate man is taken away, to be hanged in six weeks.

Barnabas and Natty Bell, a family friend, find a partially burned note in the room of Lord Ronald, Cleone's neer-do-well brother. Barnabas decides to insinuate himself into the aristocrats' social circle to uncover the real thief. The pair travel to London. There, Barnabas (or "John Beverley", as he calls himself) gets into a fight with a carter in the street; the Prince Regent bets on him and wins. This chance meeting gains Beverley an entree into society, where he is introduced to Lady Cleone and her set.

At a ball, Beverley wins 50,000 guineas from Ronald, despite Cleone's plea to stop wagering with her brother. Ronald cannot pay and has to write an IOU; when Beverley examines it, the handwriting is not the same as on the note he found. He tears up the IOU. Chichester is suspicious of the newcomer. He questions Pauline to make sure there is nothing linking them to the robbery. She recalls that she threw a stolen note into the fireplace, but does not recall if there was a lit fire.

Meanwhile, Beverley reveals to the grateful Cleone that he loves her and that he used loaded dice to make her brother lose. He takes her to see his father in prison, and there tells her who he is. He helps his father escape.

After Cleone breaks her engagement, Chichester and Pauline search Beverley's lodgings while he is away. They find the scrap, but then Pauline implores Chichester to go away with her and refuses to return the necklace he gave her unless he agrees. Beverley returns and finds Pauline alone. As he is questioning her, she is stabbed in the back through an open window.

Chichester obtains a warrant accusing Beverley of murdering Pauline and goes to a ball where he is expected. Beverley manages to get away, driving a coach bearing Cleone and the Marquess, with Chichester in hot pursuit. Beverley returns to the Barty inn, where his father and Natty are waiting. There, the Bartys are arrested, but it is all a ruse. Chichester is tricked into identifying a handkerchief as his. It was found on Pauline's body and contains the stolen pearls. Chichester, after trying to stab Beverley, is taken away. Cleone suggests she and Beverely elope; as they are leaving, they run into her brother Ronald and Georgina Huntstanton, who have had the same idea.

== Cast ==
- Douglas Fairbanks Jr. as John Beverley / Barnabas Barty
- Elissa Landi as Lady Cleone Meredith
- Gordon Harker as Natty Bell
- Basil Sydney as Louis Chichester
- Hugh Williams as Lord Ronald Meredith
- Irene Browne as Lady Huntstanton
- Athole Stewart as Marquess of Comberhurst
- Coral Browne as Pauline Darville
- Margaret Lockwood as Georgina Huntstanton
- Esmé Percy as John Townsend
- Frank Bertram as Belcher
- Gilbert Davis as Prince Regent
- Frank Pettingell as John Barty
- June Duprez as minor role

== Reception ==
The Amateur Gentleman was voted the tenth best British film of 1936 by Film Weekly.

The Monthly Film Bulletin wrote: "The acting is competent, though Douglas Fairbanks seems a trifle mannered. Elissa Landi is altogether too whimsical and coy. Gordon Harker gives a convincing performance as Natty Bell, the father's old friend, and Esme Percy makes an amusing fop. The Prince Regent is perhaps a little more sedate, and a good deal less corpulent, than the original."

Variety wrote: "It is an unexciting picturization of Jeffrey Farnol's mantic novel of the same title, only the Fairbanks name gives it a chance for moderate grosses at best. Picture bogs down in all important elements, most essential of which are the screenplay, photography and direction."
