= The Amateur Gentleman (1926 film) =

1926 film

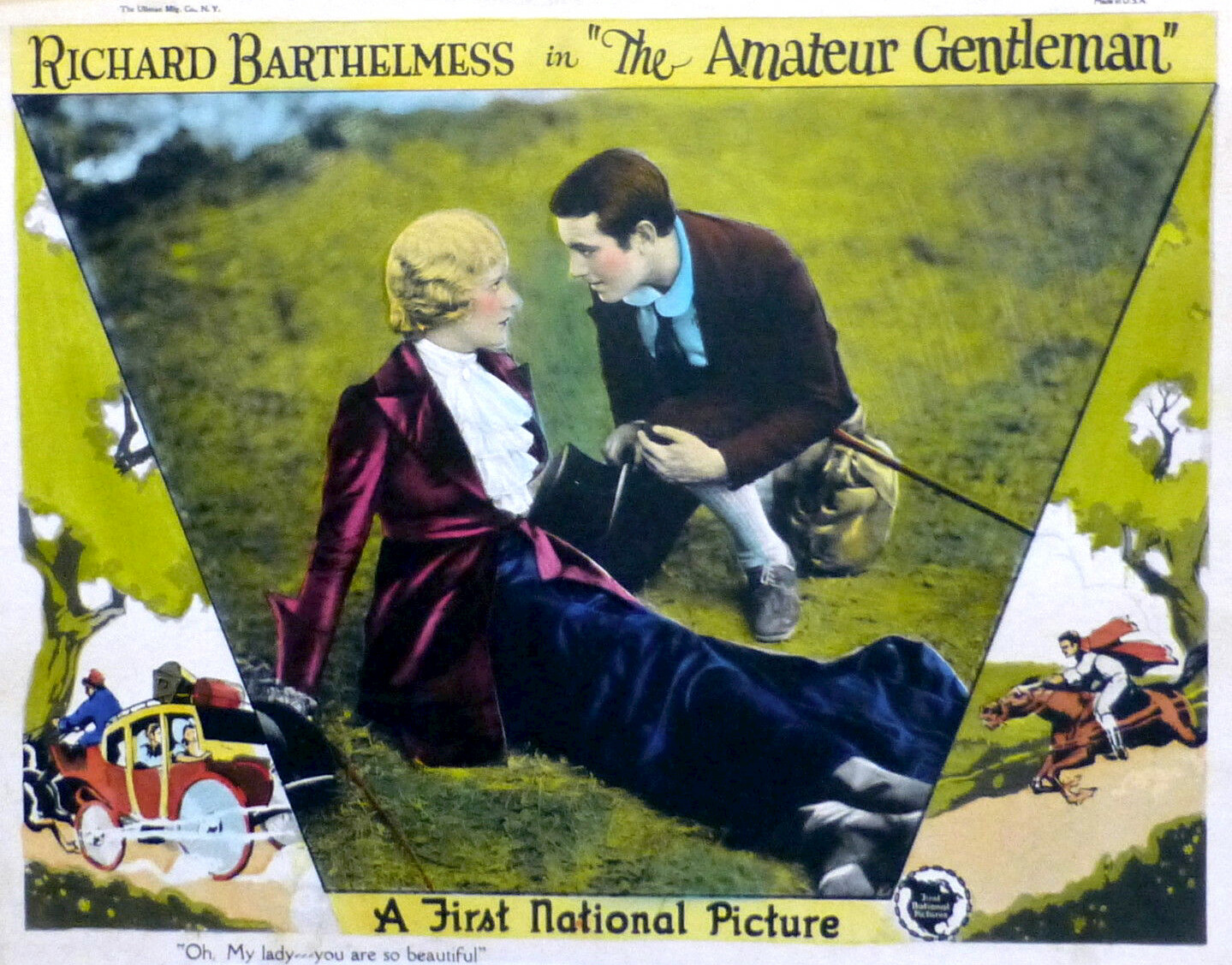
- Lobby card
- Directed by: Sidney Olcott
- Written by: Jeffrey Farnol (novel); Lillie Hayward (scenario); Tom Miranda (titles)
- Produced by: Richard Barthelmess
- Starring: Richard Barthelmess; Dorothy Dunbar
- Cinematography: David W. Gobbett
- Distributed by: First National
- Release date: August 15, 1926
- Running time: 8 reels; 7,790 feet
- Country: United States
- Language: Silent (English intertitles)

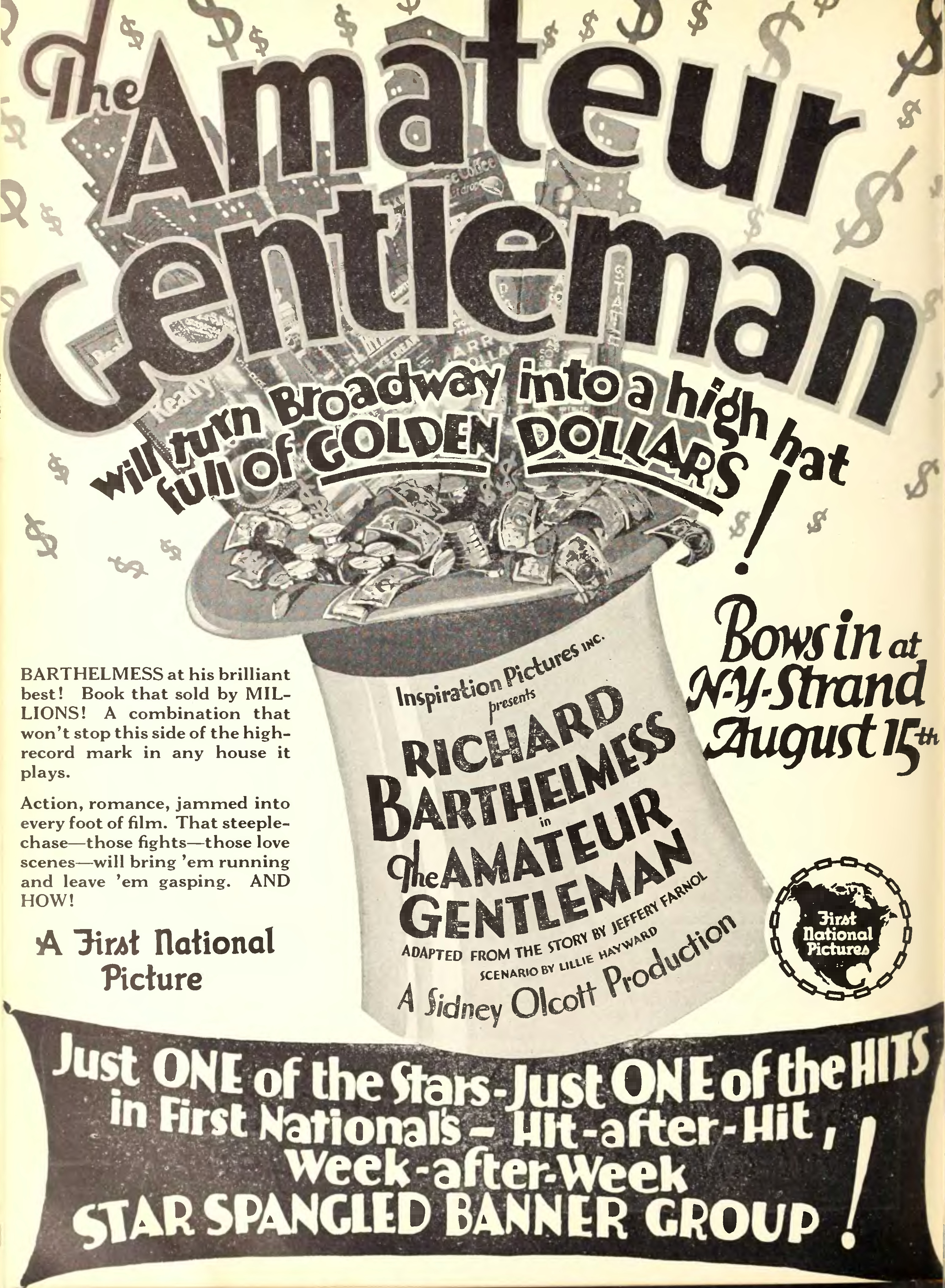
The Amateur Gentleman ad in Motion Picture News, 1926

The Amateur Gentleman is a 1926 American silent drama film produced by Inspiration Pictures and distributed through First National Pictures. Sidney Olcott directed it as a vehicle for star Richard Barthelmess.

The story was previously adapted into a 1920 British silent film, and it was filmed again in 1936 with Douglas Fairbanks, Jr.

The Amateur Gentleman is preserved in the George Eastman House Motion Picture Collection.

== Cast ==
- Richard Barthelmess as Barnabas Barty
- Dorothy Dunbar as Lady Cleone Meredith
- Gardner James as Ronald Barrymaine
- Nigel Barrie as Sir Mortimer Carnaby
- Brandon Hurst as Peterby
- John Miljan as Viscount Devenham
- Edwards Davis as John Barty
- Billie Bennett as Duchess of Camberhurst
- Herbert Grimwood as Jasper Gaunt
- Gino Corrado as Prince Regent
- Sidney De Gray as Captain Chumley
- Hans Joby as Captain Slingsby

== Production notes ==
The film was shot at Clune studios on Melrose Avenue in Hollywood, and at the Samuel S. Hinds house in Pasadena.
