= Mermaid Comedies =

Comedy short films produced in the United States

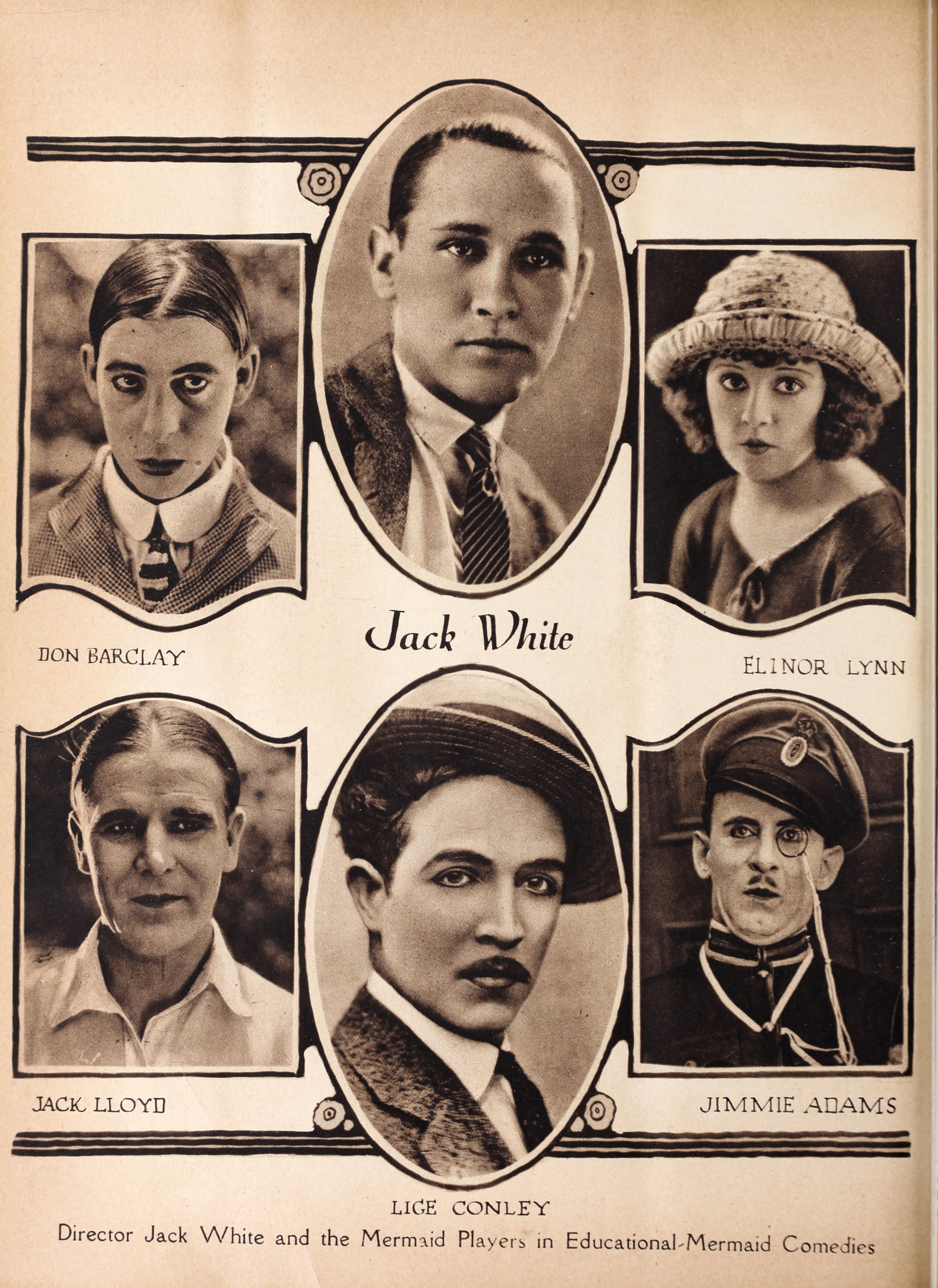
Promotion from 1922 with photos of Jack White (center) and Don Barclay, Jack Lloyd, Lige Conley, Jimmie Adams and Elinor Lynn

Mermaid Comedies are comedy short films that were produced in the United States. They were distributed by Earle W. Hammons' Educational Pictures and were at the high end of its comedy series brands.

Directors of the films included Al St. John and Arvid E. Gillstrom. They were promoted as the world's funniest 2-reelers.

== Partial filmography ==
- Duck Inn (1920)
- A Fresh Start (1920)
- The Vagrant (1921)
- What a Night (1924), extant, part of MoMA's collection
- His First Car (1924), directed by Al St. John featuring Doris Deane. Extant.
- Never Again (1924), directed by Al St. John and featuring Carmencita
- Stupid, But Brave (1924), directed by Roscoe Arbuckle, extant
- Rapid Transit (1925), directed by Al St. John. Lost.
- Red Pepper (1925), directed by Arvid E. Gillstrom and featuring Judy King. Extant in the MOMA's film collection
- Curses! (1925)
- Dynamite Doggie (1925), extant
- Going Places
- Uncle Sam

== See also ==
- List of American live-action shorts
