= The Lion's Den (1936 film) =

1936 film

- Directed by: Sam Newfield
- Written by: John T. Neville; L.V. Jefferson
- Produced by: Sigmund Neufeld; Leslie Simmonds
- Starring: Tim McCoy; Joan Woodbury; Don Barclay
- Cinematography: Jack Greenhalgh
- Edited by: John English; Holbrook N. Todd
- Music by: Lee Zahler
- Production company: Sigmund Neufeld Productions
- Distributed by: Puritan Pictures
- Release date: July 8, 1936
- Running time: 59 minutes
- Country: United States
- Language: English

The Lion's Den is a 1936 American Western film directed by Sam Newfield and starring Tim McCoy, Joan Woodbury and Don Barclay.

== Cast ==
- Tim McCoy as Tim Barton
- Joan Woodbury as Ann Mervin
- Don Barclay as Paddy Callahan
- J. Frank Glendon as Nate Welsh
- John Merton as Single-Shot Smith
- Arthur Millett as Newt Mervin
- Jack Rockwell as Texas Ranger
- Dick Curtis as Slim Burtis - Henchman

== Bibliography ==
- Pitts, Michael R. Western Movies: A Guide to 5,105 Feature Films. McFarland, 2012.
