= Jack White (film producer) =

American film producer, director and writer (1897–1984)

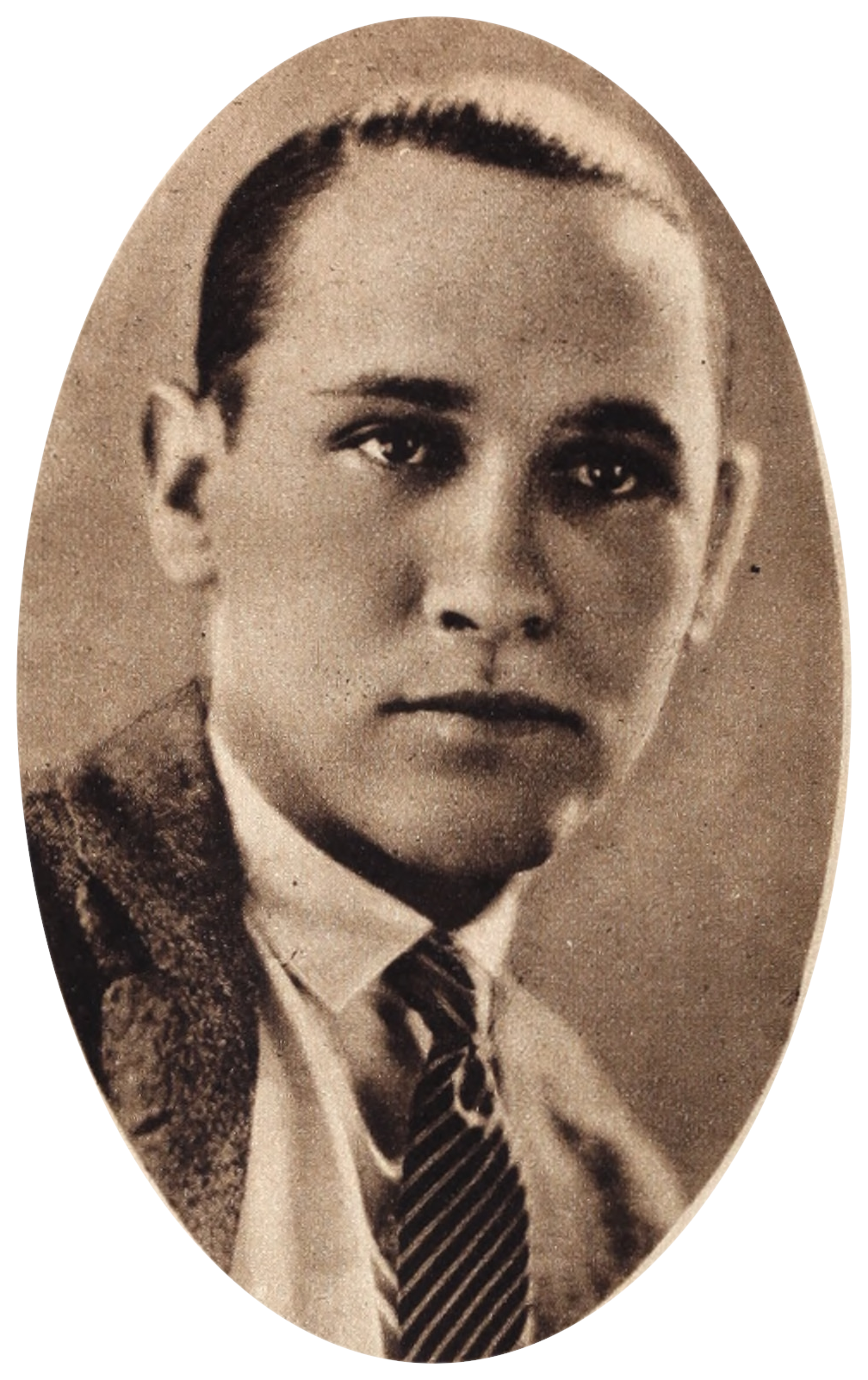
- White in 1922
- Born: Jacob Weiss; March 2, 1897; Budapest, Kingdom of Hungary, Austria Hungary
- Died: April 10, 1984 (aged 87); North Hollywood, California, United States
- Other name: Preston Black
- Years active: 1920–1959
- Spouses: Pauline Starke (m. 1927; div. 1931); Charlotte "Toni" Corsich (m. 1955)
- Relatives: Sam White (brother); Jules White (brother); Ben White (brother)

Jack White (born Jacob Weiss; March 2, 1897 – April 10, 1984) was an American film producer, director and writer. His career in the film industry began in the late 1910s and continued until the early 1960s. White produced over 300 films; directed more than 60 of these, and wrote more than 50. He directed some of his sound comedies under the pseudonym "Preston Black."

== Early life ==
Immigrating to America from Hungary in 1905, White and his family lived in Hollywood, California. A nearby stable was used to engage in the new business of motion pictures. Jack and his three brothers, Jules White, Sam White, and Ben White rode horses as extras in outdoor westerns. This was the start of the brothers' movie careers; they became directors and/or producers. The fourth brother, Ben White, became a cameraman.

== Career ==
While still a teenager, Jack White became the leading producer for Educational Pictures, making very popular comedy shorts with Lloyd Hamilton, Lupino Lane, Lige Conley, and Al St. John.

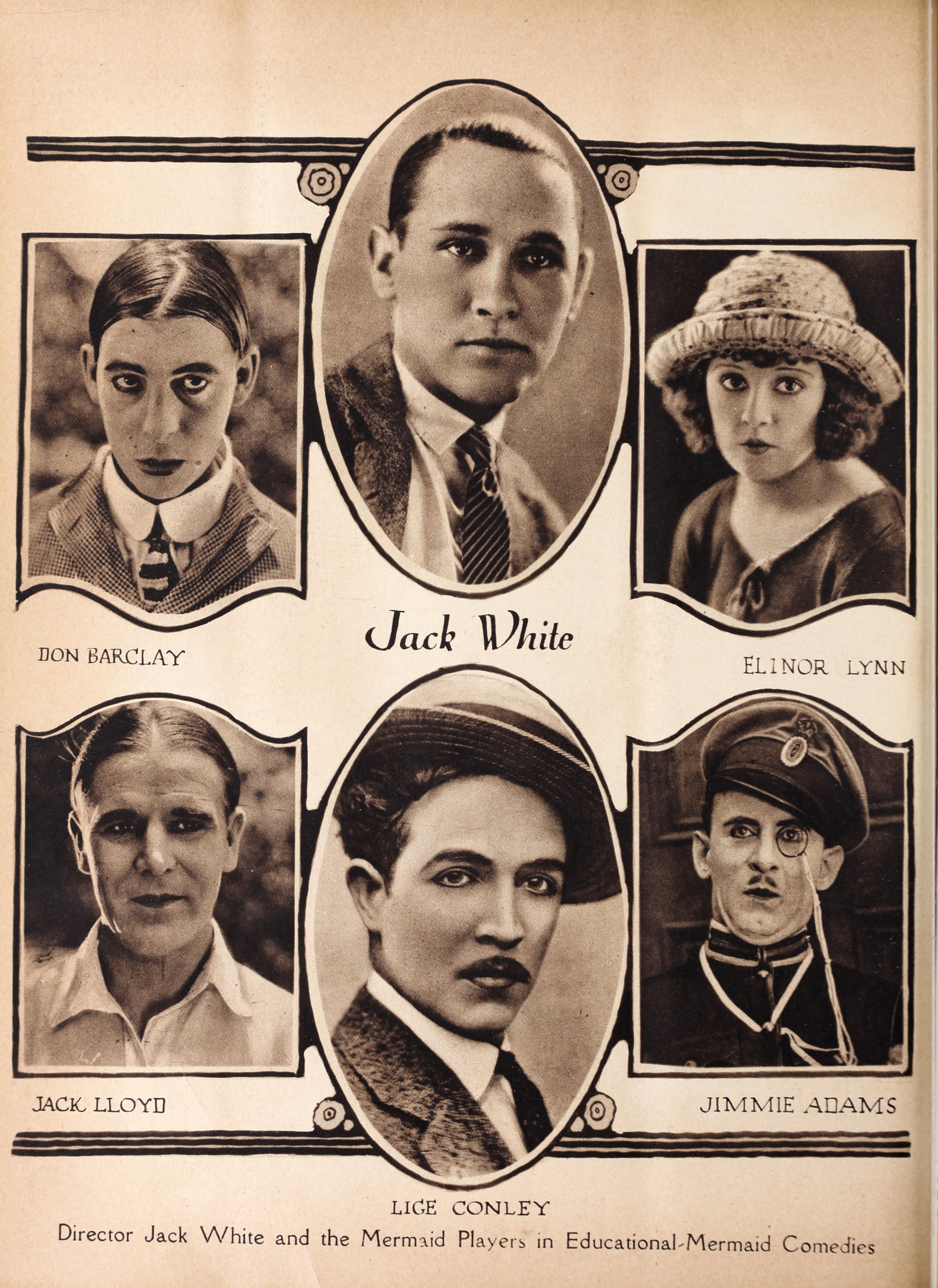
Promotion from 1922 with photos of Jack White (center) with Mermaid Comedies "Players" Don Barclay, Jack Lloyd, Lige Conley, Jimmie Adams and Elinor Lynn

In 1926, White produced a comedy short for Educational Pictures, The Radio Bug, directed by Stephen Roberts in both a silent and Phonofilm version. Also in 1926, Jack White hired one of his younger brothers, Jules White, as a film editor. By the 1930s, Jules had eclipsed Jack as a leading producer of comedy short subjects, largely with the Three Stooges. In 1935, Jules hired Jack as a writer and director. Jack's first Stooges film was Ants in the Pantry (1936); he worked in Columbia's shorts department through 1937. He rejoined the unit briefly in the early 1940s before serving in the military, then returned to Columbia for good in 1951.

During the 1950s, rising production costs forced Columbia to economize, and reuse sequences from older pictures. Jules White called upon Jack White to write new scripts that plausibly incorporated scenes from some other movie. Jack's biggest challenge was probably the Stooge short Scheming Schemers (released 1956), for which he not only had to insert old scenes from three older Stooge shorts, but he had to write around the absence of co-star Shemp Howard, who had died in 1955. Jack's creative ideas cleverly hid the patchwork; according to Columbia director Edward Bernds, neither audiences nor exhibitors ever noticed the old footage in the new comedies. White worked at Columbia until the comedy shorts unit closed on December 20, 1957.

== Personal life ==
Jack White married silent-film actress Pauline Starke on September 4, 1927; the marriage was unhappy and they divorced in 1931. Starke's lawyers pressured White, prompting White to adopt the "Preston Black" pseudonym to avoid further distress.

White died on April 10, 1984.

== Filmography ==
- The Radio Bug (1926), producer
