= Jimmie Adams =

American comedian and actor

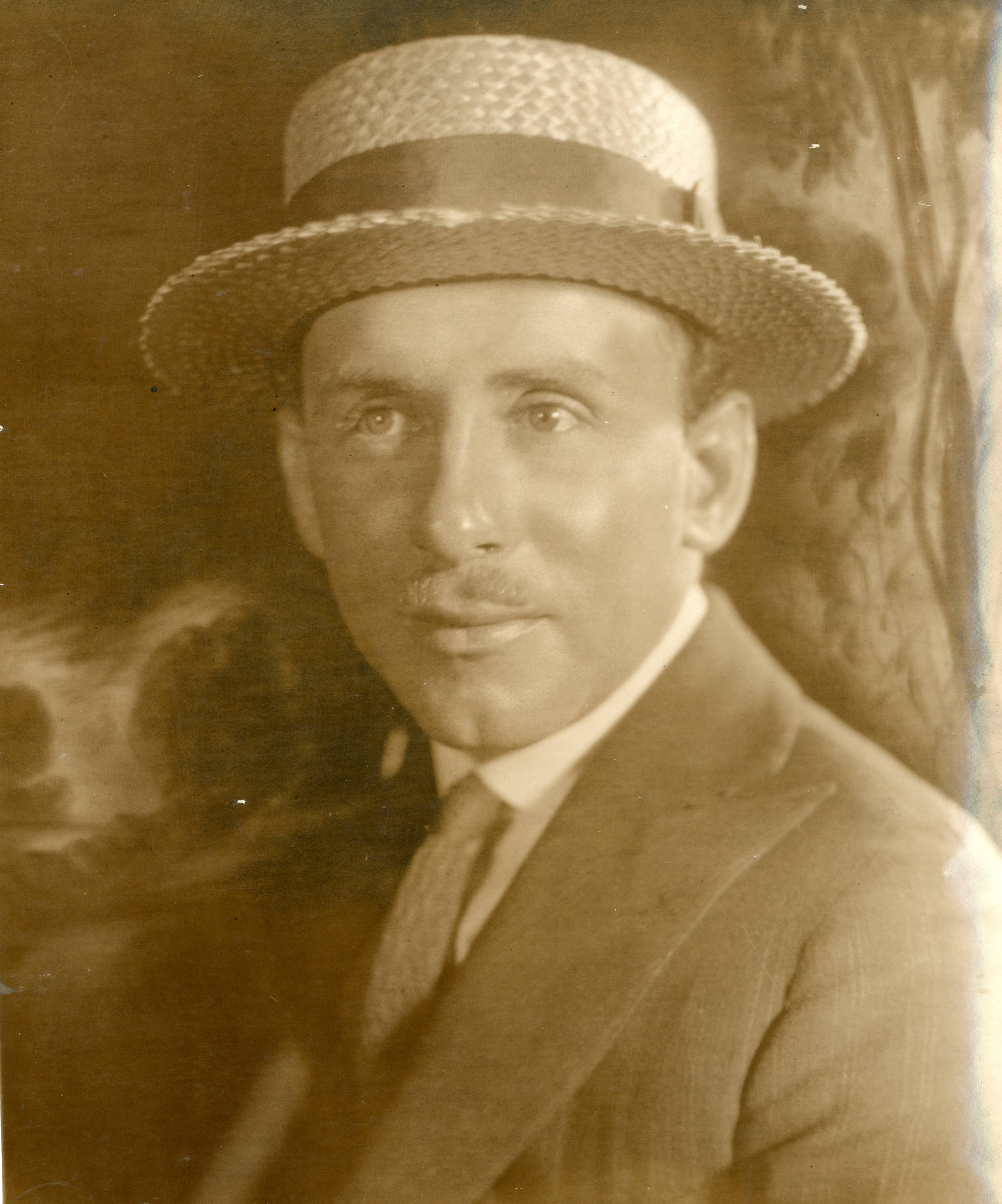
- Adams in 1922
- Born: James B. Adams; October 4, 1888; Paterson, New Jersey, U.S.
- Died: December 19, 1933 (aged 45); Glendale, California, U.S.
- Occupation: Actor
- Years active: 1917–1933
- Spouse: Virginia Warwick

James B. Adams (October 4, 1888 – December 19, 1933) was an American silent-screen comedian and actor.

== Career ==
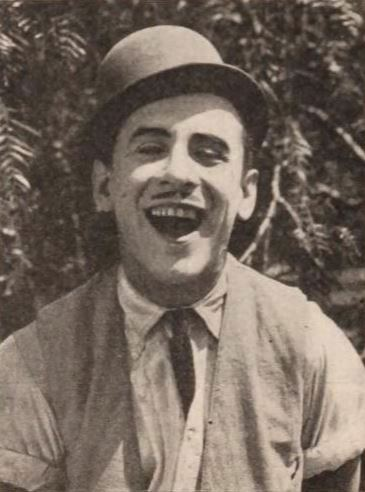
Jimmie Adams in 1921

In 1921, Adams starred in two-reel comedies for Educational Pictures and Al Christie. The slightly built, pencil-mustached Adams has been described by historian Kalton C. Lahue as "a poor man's Charley Chase." Like Chase, and unlike the other comics at Educational, Adams favored situational comedy over slapstick.

He briefly replaced Mack Sennett comic Harry McCoy in the cartoon-inspired Hall Room Boys series (produced by Harry Cohn and Jack Cohn, later of Columbia Pictures). By 1924, Adams was back with Educational.

Adams in a 1926 silent comedy

Christie hired Adams for six comedies released in 1926 and 1927. The Christie comedies were more polite and less extreme than the slam-bang comedies of other studios, but Christie's soft-pedal comedy style did find an audience. Star comedians Jimmie Adams, Bobby Vernon, Lige Conley, Neal Burns, and Billy Dooley constituted a lineup that was no threat to Hal Roach, but nevertheless entertained millions with a style than neither Roach or Mack Sennett could or would provide.

Adams was also a singer. In 1930, he co-starred with burly comic Bud Jamison as The Rolling Stones, a pair of singing vagabonds touring America. Adams also sang with The Ranch Boys, a musical group featured in Charley Chase comedies.

== Death ==
Adams died of myocardial infarction at age of 45, in Glendale, California.

== Partial filmography ==
- An Accidental Champion (1922)
- Hold Your Breath (1924)
- Triumph (1924)
- Stop Flirting (1925)
- Her Man o' War (1926)
- The Farmer's Daughter (1928)
- The Office Scandal (1929)
- The Grand Parade (1930)

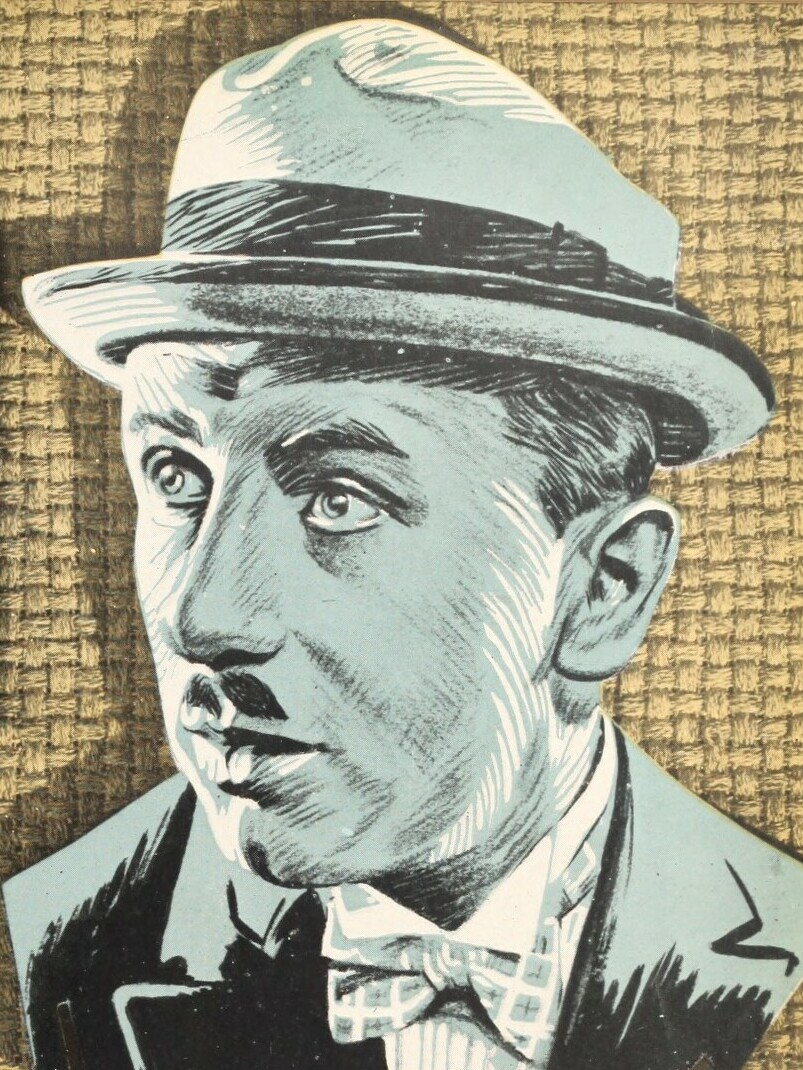
Jimmie Adams art in Educational Pictures advertisement from 1926 Motion Picture News

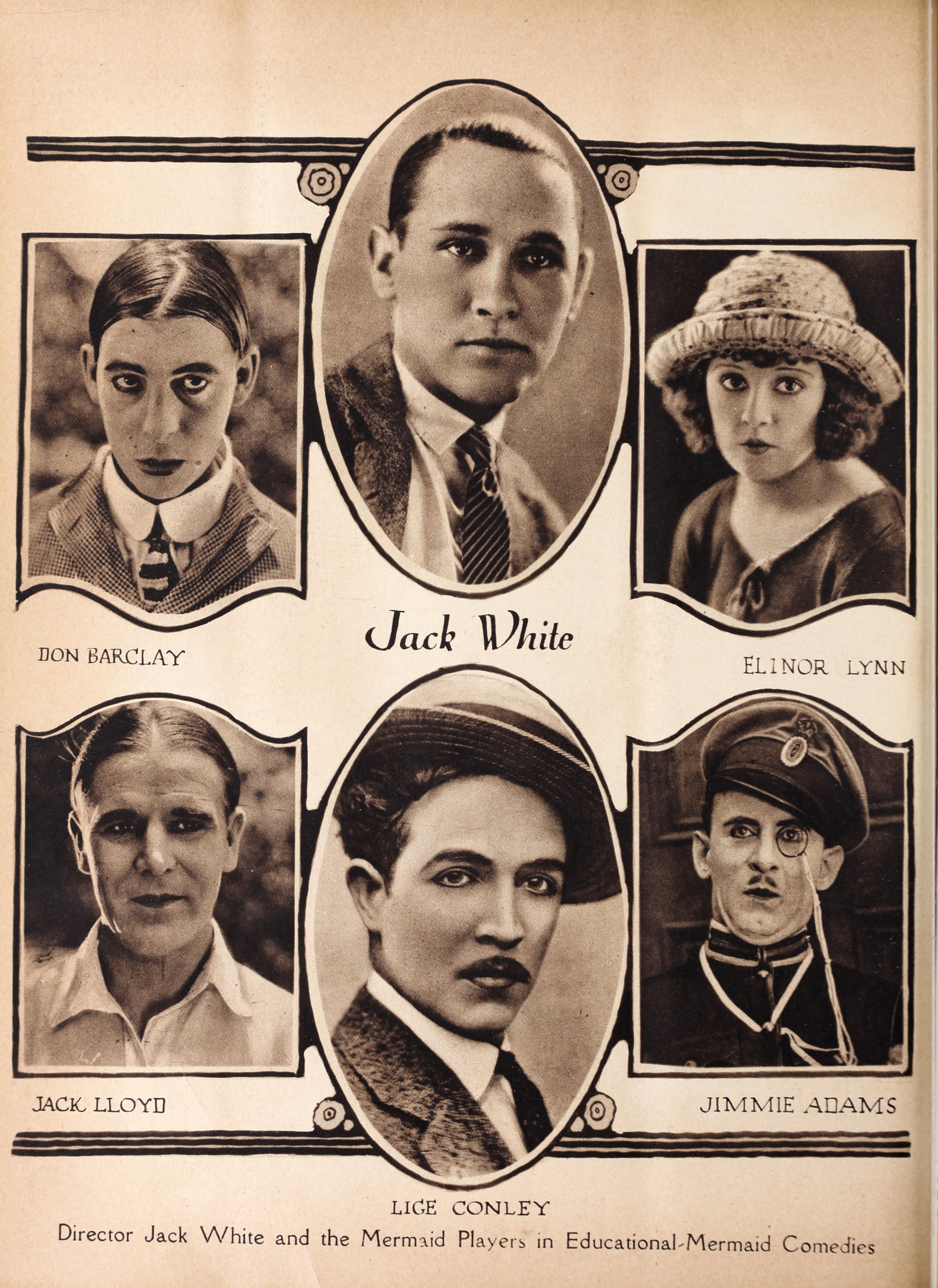
Promotion from 1922 with photos of Jack White (center) and Mermaid Comedies "Players" Don Barclay, Jack Lloyd, Lige Conley, Jimmie Adams and Elinor Lynn
