= Budd Fine =

American character actor (1894–1966)

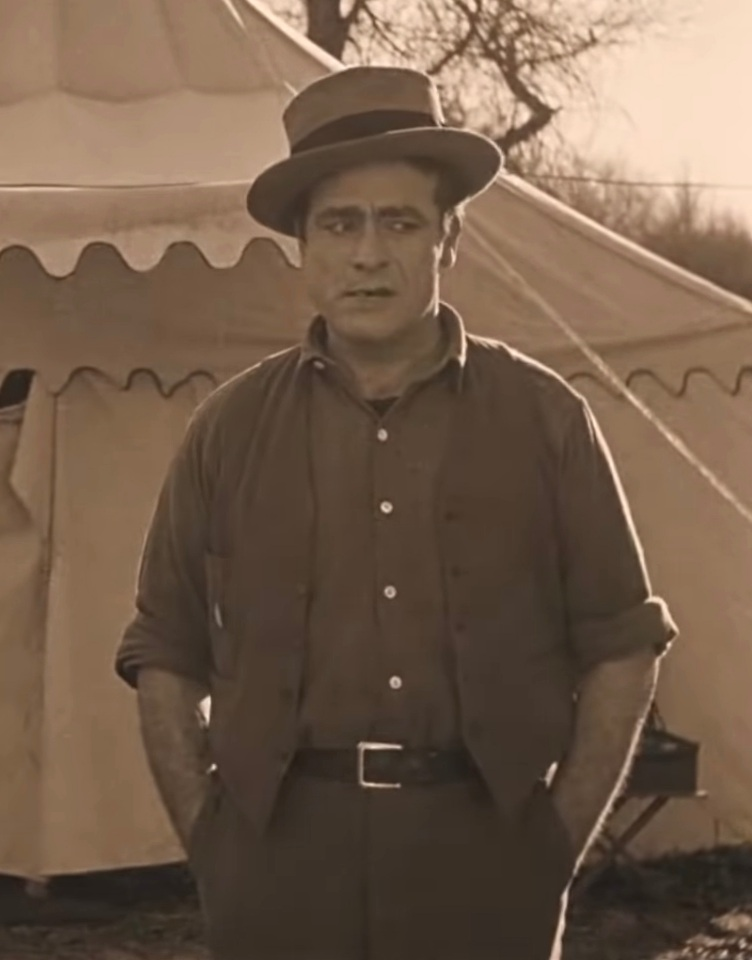
- Fine in Battling Butler (1926)
- Born: Budd Nathan Fine; September 10, 1894; Hartford, Connecticut, U.S.
- Died: February 9, 1966 (aged 71); West Los Angeles, California, U.S.
- Occupation: Actor
- Years active: 1924–1955

Budd Nathan Fine (September 10, 1894 – February 9, 1966) was an American character actor of the silent and sound film eras. Born Budd Nathan Fine on September 10, 1894, in Hartford Connecticut, Fine served in the US Army during World War I, during which he was awarded a Purple Heart.

Fine broke into the film industry in a film short in 1924, Aggravatin' Papa, and would make his feature film debut later that year with a small role in the silent film, Hold Your Breath. During the silent film era, he would make mostly shorts, with only a handful of appearances in feature films, including Buster Keaton's Battling Butler (1926), and as a soldier in the Cecil B. De Mille's 1927 epic, The King of Kings.

With the advent of the talking picture, Fine began to work steadily in feature films. He would have small roles in many notable films, such as: the first talking version of Mark Twain's A Connecticut Yankee in King Arthur's Court, 1931's A Connecticut Yankee, starring Will Rogers; Les Misérables in 1935, starring Fredric March and Charles Laughton; Anything Goes (1936), starring Bing Crosby and Ethel Merman; William Dieterle's 1939 version of The Hunchback of Notre Dame, starring Charles Laughton; the Cary Grant and Jean Arthur vehicle, Only Angels Have Wings, directed by Howard Hawks; another Grant film in 1943, also starring Laraine Day, Mr. Lucky; the classic film noir, Lady in the Lake (1947), starring Robert Montgomery; the 1947 Bob Hope comedy, also starring Dorothy Lamour, My Favorite Brunette;. The 1950s would see Fine reunite with De Mille, on his epic film, Samson and Delilah (1950), starring Victor Mature and Hedy Lamarr; he would also appear that year in the musical, Annie Get Your Gun, starring Betty Hutton and Howard Keel. He appeared in over 100 films, including over 80 feature films.

== Filmography ==
(Per AFI database)

- Hold Your Breath (1924)
- Battling Butler (1926)
- The King of Kings (1927)
- The Wreck of the Hesperus (1927)
- Oh, Yeah! (1929)
- The Racketeer (1929)
- Be Yourself! (1930)
- The Texas Ranger (1931)
- Lazy River (1934)
- Kid Millions (1934)
- We Live Again (1934)
- No More Women (1934)
- The Crime of Helen Stanley (1934)
- Good Dame (1934)
- Fugitive Lady (1934)
- The Captain Hates the Sea (1934)
- The Whole Town's Talking (1935)
- Les Misérables (1935)
- Man of Iron (1935)
- Escape from Devil's Island (1935)
- Love Me Forever (1935)
- After the Dance (1935)
- Carnival (1935)
- I'll Love You Always (1935)
- The Best Man Wins (1935)
- The Public Menace (1935)
- Unknown Woman (1935)
- The Return of Sophie Lang (1936)
- The Gay Desperado (1936)
- A Son Comes Home (1936)
- Sinner Take All (1936)
- Drift Fence (1936)
- Anything Goes (1936)
- Pennies From Heaven (1936)
- Parole! (1936)
- The Sky Parade (1936)
- The Plainsman (1937)
- Man of the People (1937)
- Parole Racket (1937)
- My Dear Miss Aldrich (1937)
- Spring Madness (1938)
- Squadron of Honor (1938)
- The Hunchback of Notre Dame (1939)
- They All Come Out (1939)
- Boy Slaves (1939)
- Thunder Afloat (1939)
- Only Angels Have Wings (1939)
- Young Tom Edison (1940)
- Girls Under 21 (1940)
- The Phantom Submarine (1940)
- Strange Cargo (1940)
- Wildcat Bus (1940)
- Meet Boston Blackie (1941)
- Mystery Ship (1941)
- Confessions of Boston Blackie (1942)
- Crossroads (1942)
- Secret Agent of Japan (1942)
- Mr. Lucky (1943)
- The Miracle of Morgan's Creek (1944)
- The Missing Juror (1944)
- Centennial Summer (1946)
- Wife Wanted (1946)
- Hollywood Bound (1946)
- Lady in the Lake (1947)
- The Beginning or the End (1947)
- My Favorite Brunette (1947)
- The Sea of Grass (1947)
- Unconquered (1948)
- The Miracle of the Bells (1948)
- Summer Holiday (1948)
- Crime on Their Hands (Three Stooges short, 1948)
- Force of Evil (1949)
- Whispering Smith (1949)
- The Window (1949)
- Samson and Delilah (1950)
- Annie Get Your Gun (1950)
- The Nevadan (1950)
- Bannerline (1951)
- Santa Fe (1951)
- The Tall Target (1951)
- On Dangerous Ground (1952)
