= The Carnival Girl =

1926 film

- Directed by: Cullen Tate
- Written by: Raymond Cannon; Robert E. Hopkins
- Produced by: Louis Lewyn
- Starring: Marion Mack; Gladys Brockwell; Frankie Darro
- Cinematography: Lee Garmes
- Edited by: W. Donn Hayes
- Production company: Louis Lewyn Productions
- Distributed by: Associated Exhibitors
- Release date: July 18, 1926
- Running time: 50 minutes
- Country: United States
- Languages: Silent; English intertitles

The Carnival Girl is a 1926 American silent drama film directed by Cullen Tate and starring Marion Mack, Gladys Brockwell and Frankie Darro.

== Cast ==
- Marion Mack as Nanette
- Gladys Brockwell as Her Mother
- Frankie Darro as Her Brother
- George Siegmann as Sigmund
- Allan Forrest as Lieutenant Allan Dale
- Jack Cooper as Gunner Sergeant Riley
- Victor Potel as Slim
- Max Asher as The Barker

== Bibliography ==
- Munden, Kenneth White. The American Film Institute Catalog of Motion Pictures Produced in the United States, Part 1. University of California Press, 1997.
