= Battling Buttler =

Musical, composed by Philip Braham, premiered in 1922

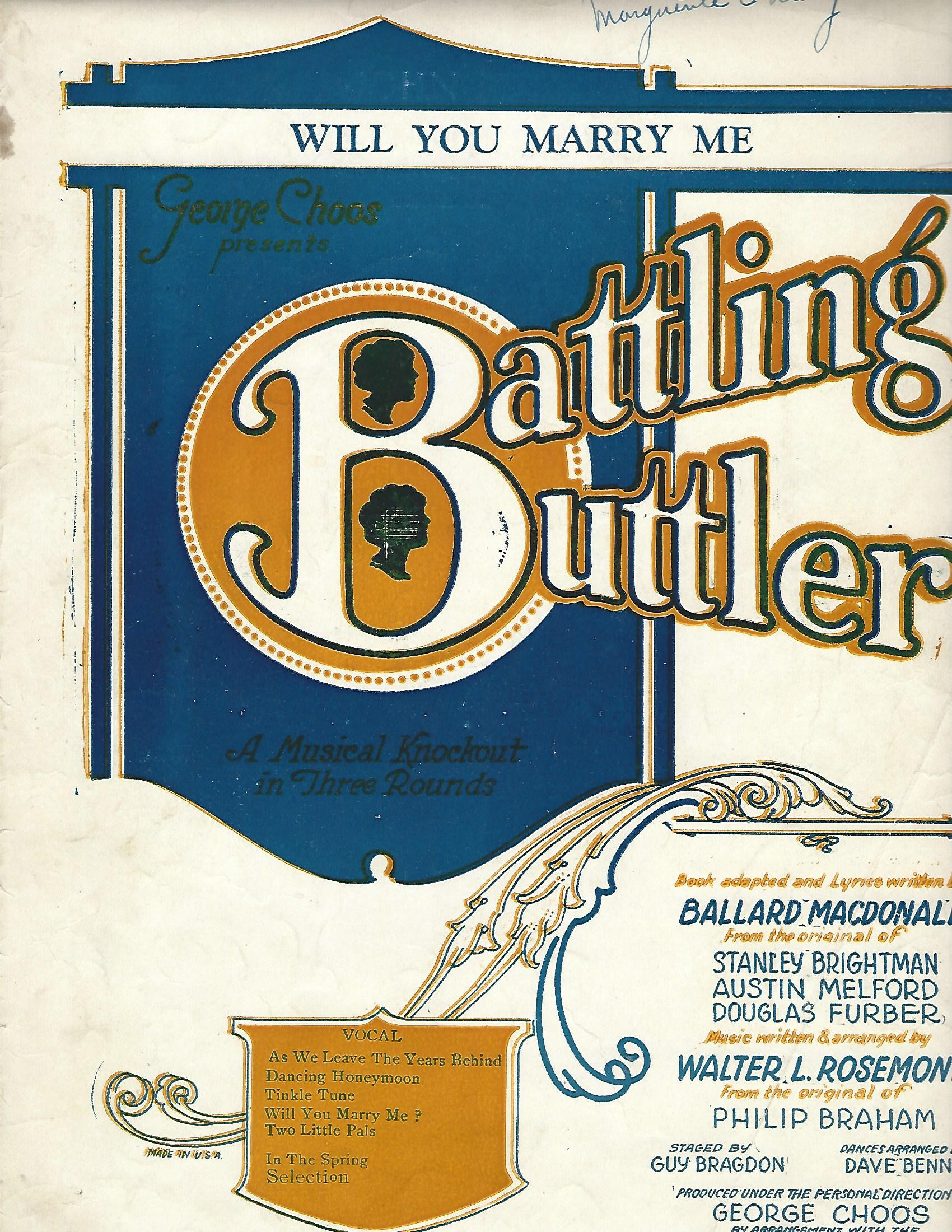
- Sheet music from the Broadway production
- Music: Philip Braham (American version by Walter L. Rosemont)
- Lyrics: Stanley Brightman; Austin Melford; Douglas Furber (American version revised by Ballard MacDonald)
- Book: Stanley Brightman; Austin Melford; Douglas Furber (American version revised by Ballard MacDonald)

Battling Buttler is a musical in three acts with music by Philip Braham and a book and lyrics by Stanley Brightman, Austin Melford and Douglas Furber, which opened in London in 1922. It was then greatly revised by Walter L. Rosemont (music) and Ballard MacDonald (book and lyrics) and produced on Broadway in 1923 after tryouts in Detroit and Chicago.

The farcical story concerns a man who pretends to be a championship boxer whom he resembles, until the two men are confused with one another, with humorous results.

== Productions ==
Battling Buttler premiered in London on December 8, 1922, at the New Oxford Theatre, where it ran for 238 performances, starring Jack Buchanan, who also produced and choreographed the musical.

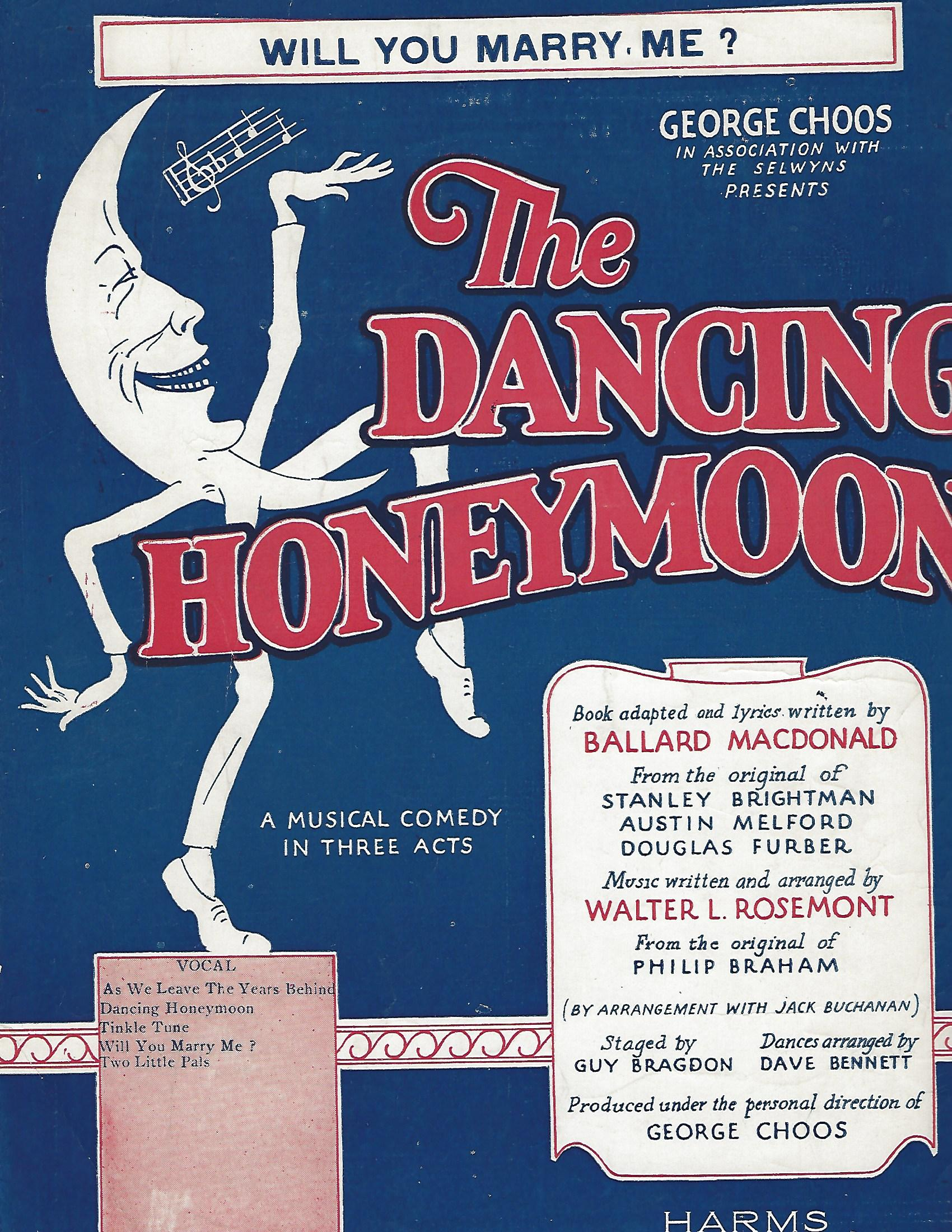
Sheet music from The Dancing Honeymoon

After a major rewrite and Americanization by Walter L. Rosemont (music) and Ballard MacDonald (book and lyrics), the musical was produced under the name The Dancing Honeymoon, opening on August 19, 1923, to rave reviews in Detroit, Michigan. It then played in Chicago under the same name before coming to New York. It was then renamed Mr. Battling Buttler and opened on Broadway at the Selwyn Theater on October 8, 1923, and closed on April 20, 1924, when it moved to the Times Square Theatre, opening the next day on April 21, 1924, and closing July 5, 1924, for a total of 313 performances. It was produced in America by George Choos by arrangement with Buchanan and The Selwyns. The musical was staged in America by Guy F. Bragdon, with dances arranged by Dave Bennett, and featured songs by Joseph Meyer, Adorjan Dorian Otvos and Louis Breau. Only two of the Braham and Furber songs were retained. A radio performance was played on radio station WOR on October 22, 1923. After Broadway, the show went on the road, including performances in Philadelphia at the Chestnut Street Opera House starting November 10, 1924, and in Wilmington, Delaware, starting December 22, 1924. The cast starred Charles Ruggles.

The musical was adapted into a 1926 silent film titled Battling Butler directed by and starring Buster Keaton. The New York Times noted the difference in the spelling of the name of the central character between the stage and film versions.

== Synopsis (American version) ==
Alfred Buttler, who leads a quiet life in a small town in New Hampshire, somewhat resembles a welterweight boxing champion by the same name. He tells his trusting wife that he is the boxing champion, although he knows nothing about boxing. This gives Alfred the opportunity to leave home for weeks at a time to attend "training". Instead, he goes to have fun in the city with his old friends. In the second act, his wife (and the chorus) follow him, and the real Battling Buttler, who likes the joke, insists that the fake Buttler take his place in the boxing ring. When Alfred's wife runs into the boxer's wife, the two women assume that they are married to the same man, and farcical complications ensue.

== Roles and American cast ==
- Alfred Buttler – Charlie Ruggles
- Ernest Hozier – William T. Kent
- Battling Buttler – Frank Sinclair
- Bertha Buttler, the boxer's wife – Frances Halliday
- Mrs. Alfred Buttler – Helen Eley
- Deacon Grafton – Eugene McGregor
- Nancy – Helen La Vonne
- Marigold – Mildred Keats
- Edith – Marie Saxon
- A Chauffeur – George Sands
- Frank Bryant – Jack Squire
- Sweeney – Guy Voyer
- Spink – Teddy McNamara
- Feature Dancers – Grant and Wing
- Eccentric Dancers – George Sands and Mack Davis
- Exceptional Dancer – George Dobbs

== Songs from the Broadway version ==
(music by Rosemont and lyrics by MacDonald, unless otherwise noted)

Act I (The Home of Alfred Buttler, Silver Lake, New Hampshire)

- “If Every Day Was Sunday” – Deacon Grafton, Ensemble and others (music by A. Dorian Otvos)
- “You’re So Sweet” – Marigold, Edith and Ensemble (music by Joseph Meyer)
- “Apples, Bananas and You” – Alfred Buttler and Mrs. Alfred Buttler (music by Philip Braham; lyrics by Douglas Furber)
- “Two Little Pals” – Frank Bryant and Ernest Hozier
- “Will You Marry Me?” – Marigold and others

Act II (“Sweeney’s” at Malba, Long Island)

- “Tinkle Tune” – Spink, Nancy, Ensemble and others (music by Louis Breau and Otvos)
- “Dancing Honeymoon” – Frank Bryant, Marigold, Ensemble and others (music by Philip Braham; lyrics by Douglas Furber)
- “All Dressed Up” – Kate and Ensemble
- “Wish” – Battling Buttler
- “Finale” – Company

Act III (The 400 Athletic Club, New York City)

- “As We leave the Years Behind” – Marigold, Frank Bryant and others (music by Meyer)
- “In the Spring” – Edith and Ernest Hozier (music by Otvos)

== Reception ==
Burns Mantle of The Daily News called it "a lively show, spotted with excellent dance numbers, decorated with a variety of showy costumes and tunefully sung." John Corbin, of The New York Times, said “there is an infectious spirit to the thing that carries it at high speed through the three acts.”

== Sources ==
- Mantle, Burns (ed.) The Best Plays of 1923–24, Small, Maynard & Company, Boston.
- Dietz, Dan. The Complete Book of 1920s Broadway Musicals, Rowman & Littlefield (2019) ISBN 1538112825
