= Cullen Tate =

American film director

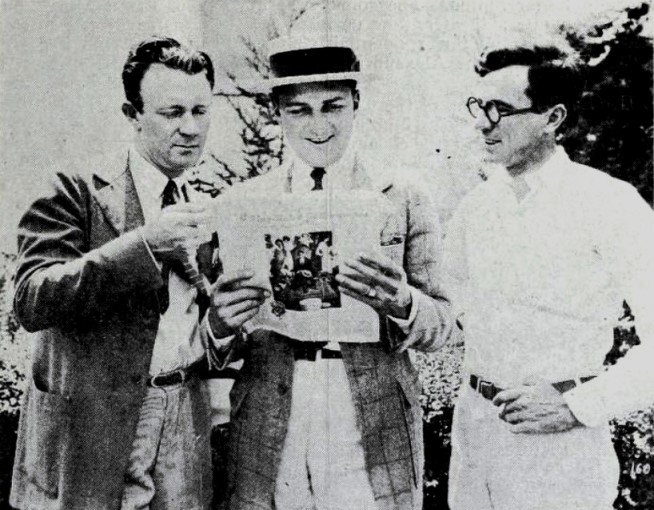
- Cullen Tate at left with Bryant Washburn and screenwriter Jules Furthman on the set of Try and Get It (1924)
- Born: Cullen Battle Tate; March 10, 1886; Paducah, Kentucky, USA
- Died: October 12, 1947 (aged 61); Hollywood, California, USA
- Occupation: assistant director
- Years active: 1917-1942
- Spouses: Bess Flowers (m. 1923; div. 1928) Frances H. Tate (m. 1930)
- Children: 1

Cullen Tate (March 10, 1886 – October 12, 1947) was an American assistant director as well as a director. He was nominated for an Oscar in the dead category of Best Assistant Director at the 1934 Academy Awards for the film Cleopatra. He was also married to actress Bess Flowers with whom he had one daughter. For several years, he often worked with Cecil B. DeMille. He worked on over 35 films from 1917 to 1942.

== Selected filmography ==
- The Ten Commandments (1923)
- Try and Get It (1924)
- The Carnival Girl (1926)
- Rose of the Golden West (1927)
- Cleopatra (1934)
- Test Pilot (1938)
- The Man in the Iron Mask (1939)
- Arise, My Love (1940)
- Take a Letter, Darling (1942)
- Road to Morocco (1942)
