= The Texas Ranger (film) =

1931 film

- Theatrical release poster
- Directed by: D. Ross Lederman
- Written by: Forrest Sheldon
- Production company: Sol Lesser Productions
- Distributed by: Columbia Pictures
- Release date: May 10, 1931
- Running time: 61 minutes
- Country: United States
- Language: English

The Texas Ranger is a 1931 American pre-Code Western film directed by D. Ross Lederman.

== Cast ==
- Buck Jones as Jim Logan, Texas Ranger
- Carmelita Geraghty as Helen Clayton
- Harry Woods as Matt Taylor
- Ed Brady as Nevady
- Nelson McDowell as 'High-Pockets' (as Nelson McDowel)
- Harry Todd as Lynn Oldring/Clayton Rider
- Billy Bletcher as Tubby
- Budd Fine as Henchman 'Breed'
- Bert Woodruff as Clayton, Helen's Father
- Silver as Silver, Jim's Horse
