= The Farmer's Daughter (1928 film) =

1928 American film

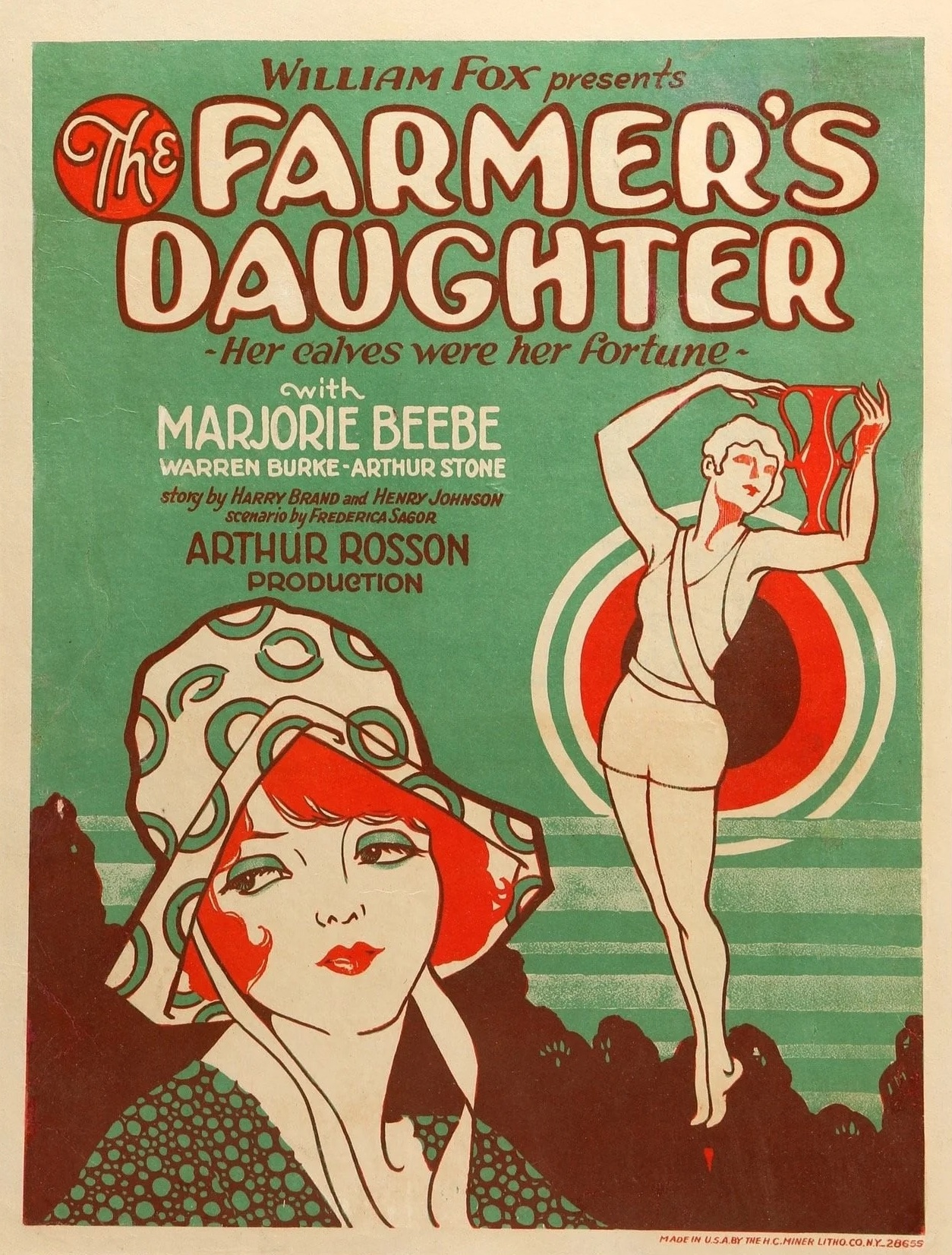
- Poster for the film
- Directed by: Arthur Rosson
- Screenplay by: Garrett Graham; Frederica Sagor Maas; Gilbert Pratt
- Story by: Harry Brand; Lou Breslow; Henry Johnson
- Starring: Marjorie Beebe; Frank Albertson; Arthur Stone; Lincoln Stedman; Jimmie Adams; Charles Middleton
- Cinematography: Joseph August
- Edited by: J. Logan Pearson
- Production company: Fox Film Corporation
- Distributed by: Fox Film Corporation
- Release date: October 14, 1928
- Running time: 60 minutes
- Country: United States
- Language: English

The Farmer's Daughter is a 1928 American silent comedy film directed by Arthur Rosson and written by Garrett Graham, Frederica Sagor Maas and Gilbert Pratt. The film stars Marjorie Beebe, Frank Albertson, Arthur Stone, Lincoln Stedman, Jimmie Adams and Charles Middleton. The film was released on October 14, 1928, by Fox Film Corporation.

== Cast ==
- Marjorie Beebe as Margerine Hopkins
- Frank Albertson as Allan Boardman Jr.
- Arthur Stone as J. Langley Smythe
- Lincoln Stedman as Noah Busby
- Jimmie Adams as Cicero Hopkins
- Charles Middleton as Hiram Flint

== Production ==
A month was spent shooting The Farmer's Daughter on location at Santa Cruz.

== Preservation ==
With no holdings located in archives, The Farmer's Daughter is considered a lost film.
