= Battling Butler =

1926 film

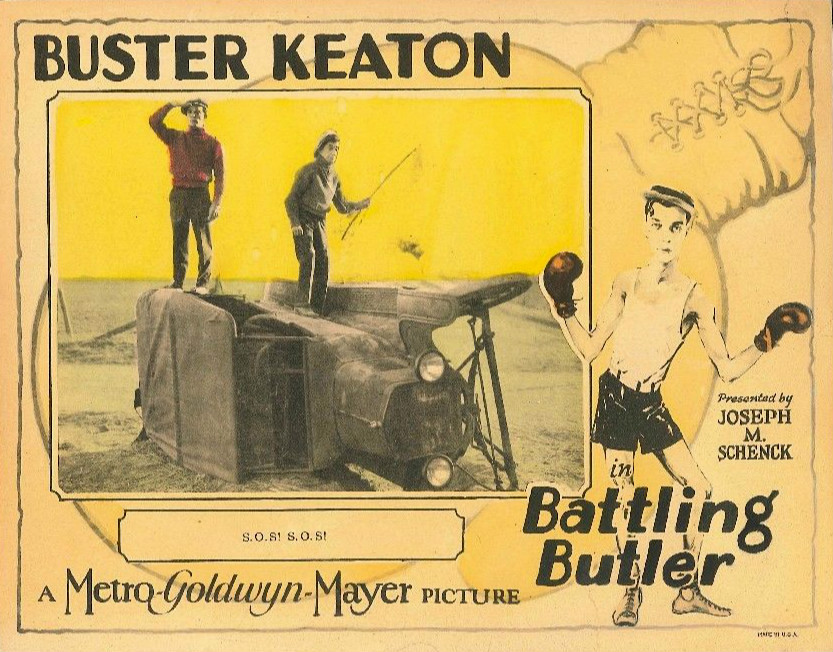
- Lobby card
- Directed by: Buster Keaton
- Written by: Al Boasberg; Lex Neal; Charles Smith; Paul Gerard Smith
- Based on: Battling Butler; 1922 play by Stanley Brightman; Austin Melford
- Produced by: Buster Keaton; Joseph M. Schenck
- Starring: Buster Keaton; Sally O'Neil; Walter James
- Cinematography: Bert Haines; Devereaux Jennings
- Production company: Buster Keaton Productions
- Distributed by: Metro-Goldwyn-Mayer
- Release date: September 18, 1926
- Running time: 77 minutes
- Country: United States
- Language: Silent (English intertitles)

Battling Butler is a 1926 American silent comedy film directed by and starring Buster Keaton. It is based on the 1922 musical Battling Buttler. The film entered the public domain in 2022.

== Plot ==
Battling Butler (1926)

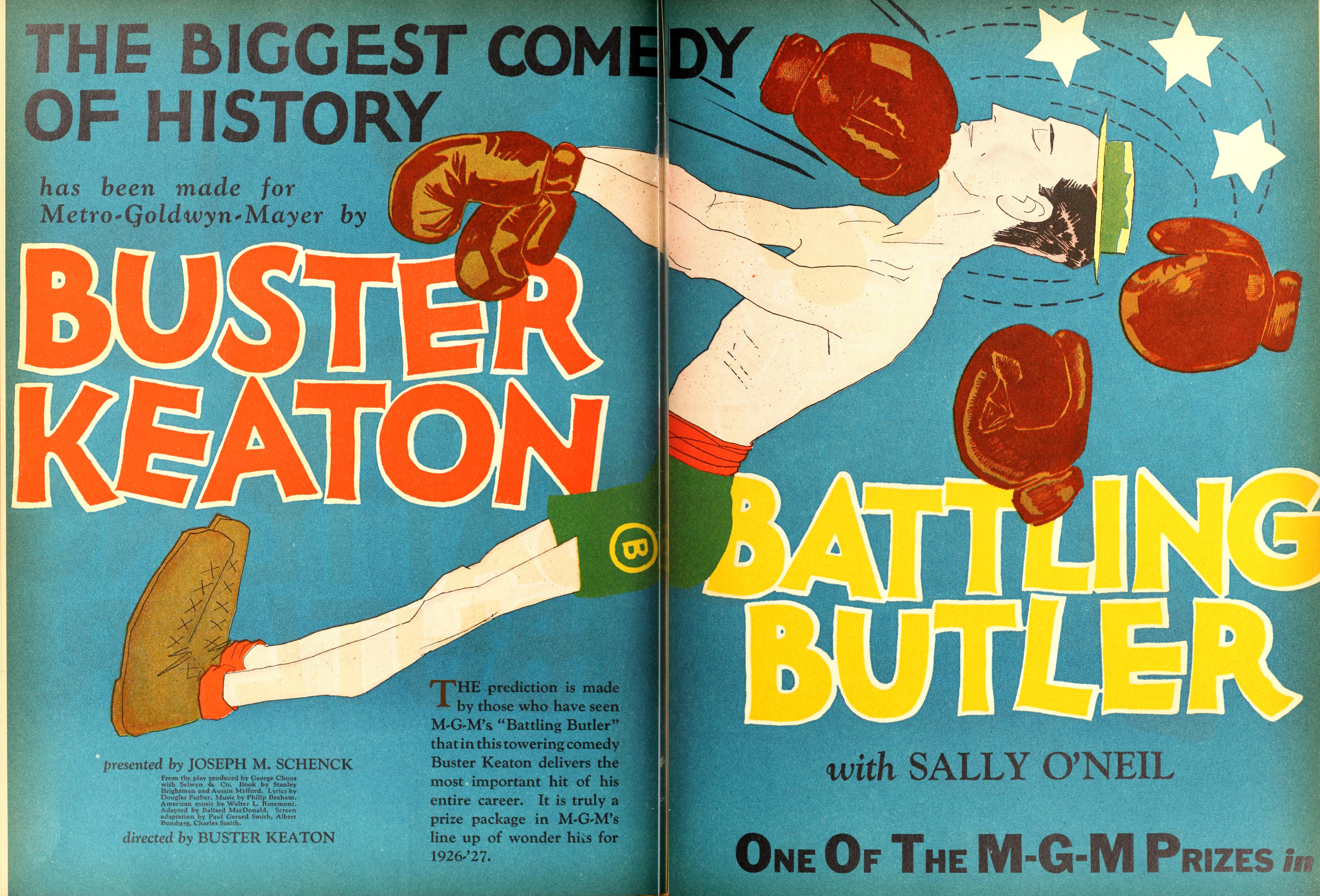
Battling Butler ad in Motion Picture News, 1926

Alfred Butler is a scion of a wealthy family, but an embarrassment to his father as Alfred is a slight, gentle young man, accustomed to ease and luxury. His father suggests a hunting and fishing trip to toughen him up. Alfred goes on the trip, accompanied by his chauffeur / personal valet. During the excursion, he falls in love at first sight with a low-class mountain girl who lives with her family in a shack. In order to impress her working–class family, the valet tells them that Alfred is the well-known professional championship fighter who happens to have the same name and fights under the professional sobriquet "Battling Butler." From there, the masquerade must be maintained, in public and in private. When he returns, Alfred is greeted by a cheering crowd of boxing enthusiasts who think that he is the fighter.

Alfred expects that he will have to actually fight one of the Battling Butler's opponents and trains as best he can. On the day of the fight, he reluctantly dons his boxing trunks and gloves, expecting to be badly beaten. To his great relief, the real Battling Butler shows up, fights, and wins.

However, the Battler resents having been impersonated by a feeble milquetoast like Alfred. In the locker room, he starts punching Alfred in the head and body. This continues until Alfred sees that the door of the locker room is open and his beloved is watching. Inspired, he begins fighting back, his confidence and fury increasing with each blow he lands. To everyone's surprise, the beating turns into a real contest, and culminates in a knockout victory for Alfred, who, in a frenzy of unaccustomed blood-lust, continues savaging the unconscious Battler until the Battler's trainer and manager rush in and restrain him. Shocked by his own prowess, he confesses his deception to his beloved. She forgives him, and they celebrate with an evening on the town, Alfred still dressed in his boxing trunks and athletic shoes, but also wearing a top hat and carrying a classy walking stick.

== Origins ==
Like Keaton's earlier Seven Chances, the film is an adaptation of a stage work. The musical was called Battling Buttler, by Walter L. Rosemont and Ballard MacDonald, and starred Charlie Ruggles on Broadway. It ran from October 8, 1923, to July 5, 1924.The New York Times noted the difference in the spelling of the name of the central character between the stage and film versions.

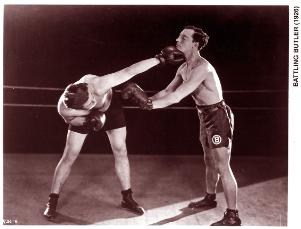

== Cast ==
- Buster Keaton as Alfred Butler
- Sally O'Neil as The mountain girl
- Walter James as her father
- Budd Fine as her brother
- Francis McDonald as Alfred "Battling" Butler
- Mary O'Brien as his wife
- Tom Wilson as his trainer
- Eddie Borden as his manager
- Snitz Edwards as Alfred's valet

== Home media ==
This film was released for home video by Kino Video in a collection with two Keaton shorts, The Frozen North and The Haunted House.

== See also ==
- Buster Keaton filmography
- List of boxing films
