= Helen Eley =

American actress and singer

Helen Eley was an American actress and singer. The Brooklyn Daily Eagle said that she was "an international vaudeville headliner and has also won fame on the formal concert stage."

== Early years ==
Eley's mother was Belle Nicholson, who formed the Nicholson Stock Company in Wilkes-Barre, Pennsylvania. Her stepfather was John S. Eley, who was a vaudeville performer before he left the stage and held several non-entertainment jobs. A "determined and wealthy aunt" wanted Eley to become a nurse, but the girl went in a different direction. When she was a teenager, she participated in amateur productions at local theaters.

Before she became an entertainer, Eley worked in several stores as a clerk and wrapping packages, and she was a manicurist. She also sang in film theaters in Pennsylvania's Wyoming Valley region. One of her regular manicure customers at the Martinique Hotel in New York City was Marie Dressler. After Dressler noticed Eley's humming while she worked, she asked her to sing, providing an impetus for the beginning of Eley's career.

== Career ==
Dressler's encouragement led to Eley's joining the touring company of Tillie's Nightmare.

Early in her career, Eley sang prima donna roles in productions under a four-year contract with the Gordon and North Amusement Company. While contracted to them, she was part of the Girls of the Gay White Way company. Albert de Courville signed her to "a prominent part" in Hello Tango, which he was producing in Europe. She replaced Ethel Levey in that cast during a six-month run in Europe and a subsequent run in Paris that ended when World War I began.

After Eley returned to the United States, she had a five-year contract (later extended to seven years) with the Shuberts. Her work for them included having leading roles in Hello, New York, Sinbad, The Blue Paradise, and The Passing Show of 1915. After that, she was in the revue Marry Me on the Keith vaudeville circuit and worked again for the Shuberts in The Midnight Rounders.

Eley and her husband, Sam Hearn, performed in major American cities and in "all the big capitals of Europe". One of their sketches, "Wanted, an Angel" (1915), had Hearn as a "type of dandified German" and Eley as a "very good looking red head". The sketch included dialog, a solo sung by Eley, Hearn playing a violin, and a duet by the pair. Their joint appearances included the Ragtime revue.

From 1919 through 1921 she was a star of Al Jolson's show at the Winter Garden Theatre in New York. On Broadway, Eley portrayed Mrs. Alfred Buttler in Battling Buttler (1923). Eley's radio debut came on Kenny Baker's program on February 21, 1947. Hearn was the featured comedian on that show. Later she was selected from a group of more than 50 people for the role of Miss Duffy in the Duffy's Tavern situation comedy.

== Personal life ==
Eley advocated the benefits of thinking as they affected a woman's appearance. "One should think, because of the outward beauty it brings to the face," she said. "It is as though the entire countenance were lighted from within."

Eley was divorced from George Leavitt on October 15, 1913. She married Hearn in late 1913 or early 1914.

== Critical response ==
The Wheeling Intelligencer called Eley "the most lovable of all prima donnas, superlatively sweet-voiced, beautiful" and added that she "possesses that magnetism that is comparable to that of an enchantress."

A review of a 1926 vaudeville performance in the trade publication Variety said that Eley, "a real big-league singing comedienne with unusually good, bright material, whammed them". The reviewer added, "She is a flaming flamboyant blonde with oceans of stuff."
