= Hold Your Breath (1924 film) =

American silent comedy film

- Directed by: Scott Sidney
- Written by: Frank Roland Conklin
- Produced by: Al Christie
- Starring: Dorothy Devore; Walter Hiers; Tully Marshall
- Cinematography: Gus Peterson; Alex Phillips
- Production company: Christie Film Company
- Distributed by: Producers Distributing Corporation
- Release date: May 25, 1924
- Running time: 60 minutes
- Country: United States
- Language: Silent (English intertitles)

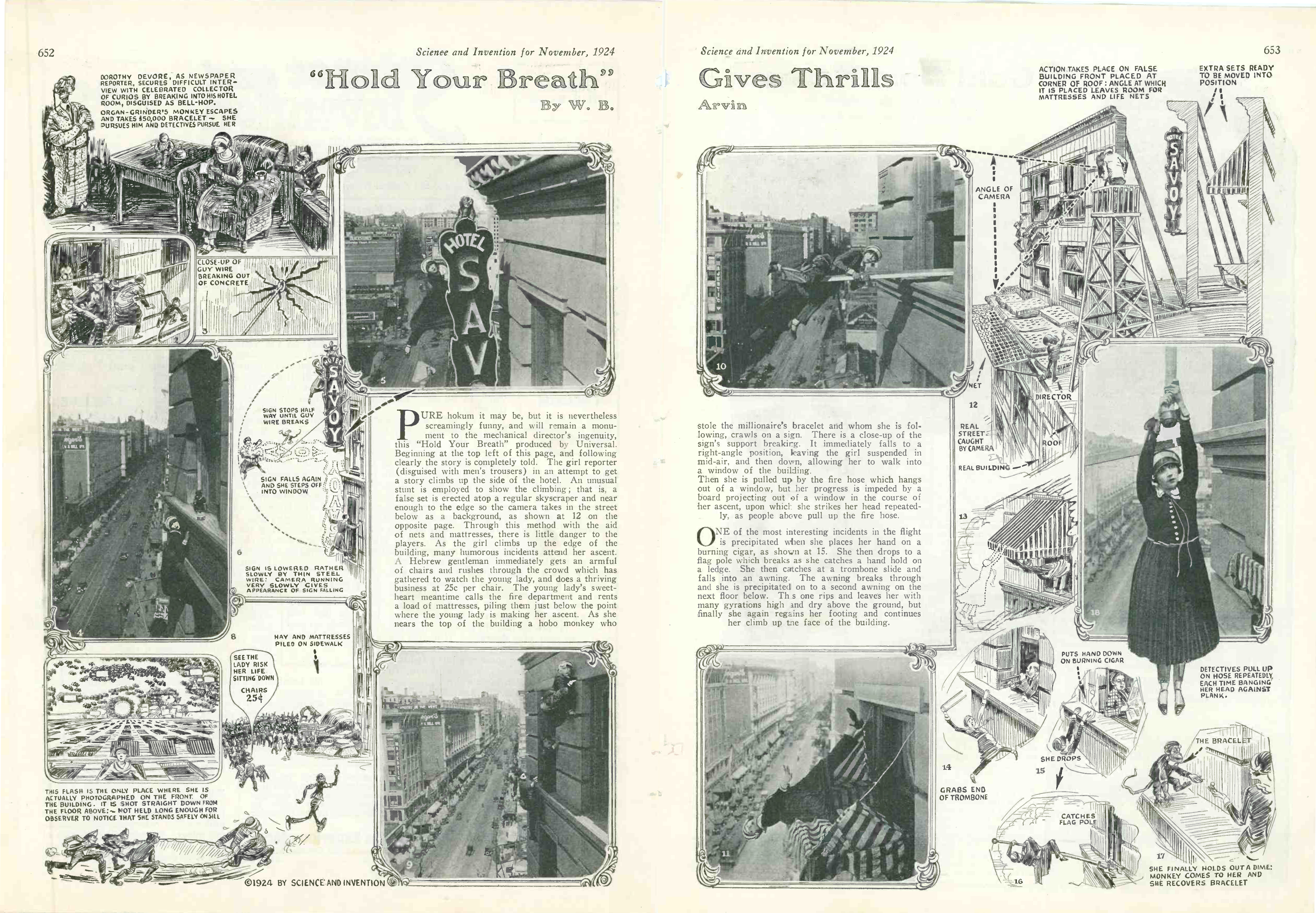
Article on the film in Science and Invention (1924).

Hold Your Breath is a 1924 American silent comedy film directed by Scott Sidney and starring Dorothy Devore, Walter Hiers, and Tully Marshall.

== Cast ==
- Dorothy Devore as Mabel
- Walter Hiers as Freddie
- Tully Marshall as Blake
- Jimmie Adams as Beauty Parlor Proprietor
- Priscilla Bonner as Mary
- James Harrison as Jack
- Lincoln Plumer as City Editor
- Patricia Palmer as Hairdresser
- Rosa Gore as Customer
- Jay Belasco as Customer
- George C. Pearce as Mayor
- Victor Rodman as Oil Salesman
- Budd Fine as Policeman
- Eddie Baker as Detective
- Max Davidson as Street Merchant

== Preservation ==
Copies of Hold Your Breath are maintained in the collections of the Library of Congress, UCLA Film & Television Archive, George Eastman Museum Motion Picture Collection, and other film archives.

== Bibliography ==
- Donald W. McCaffrey and Christopher P. Jacobs. Guide to the Silent Years of American Cinema. Greenwood Publishing, 1999. ISBN 0-313-30345-2
