= Don Barclay (actor) =

American actor and caricaturist (1892–1975)

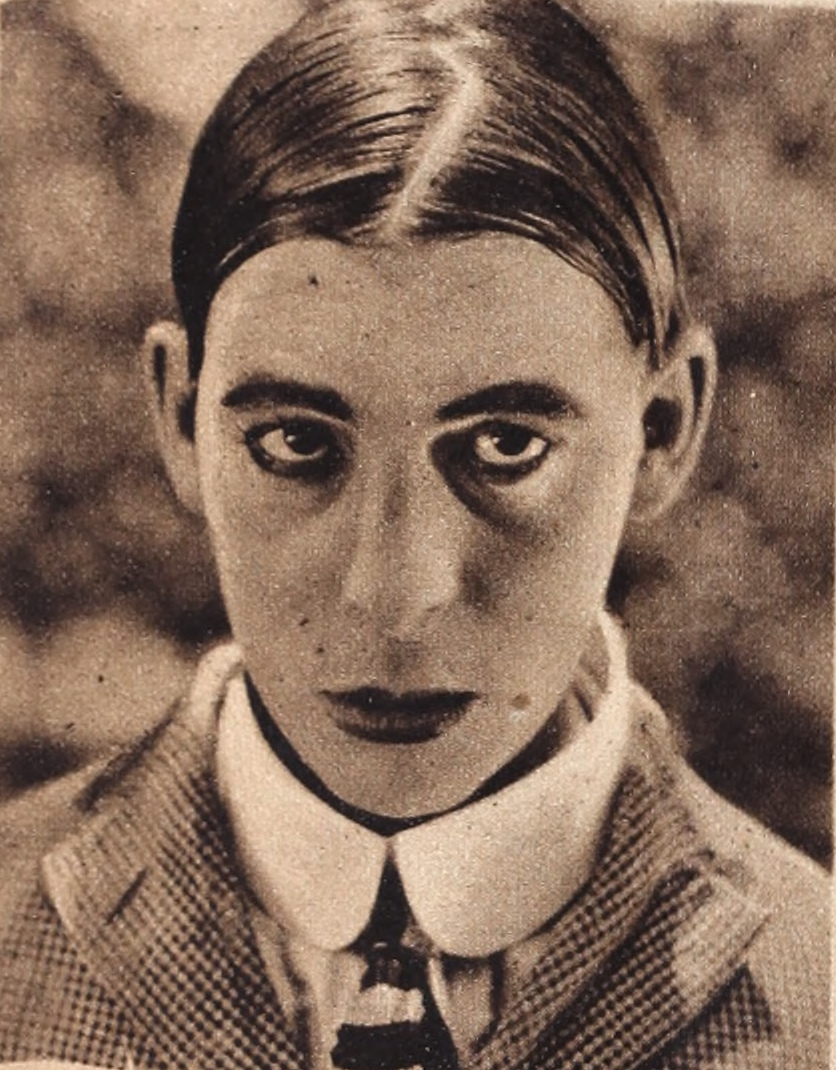
- Barclay in 1922
- Born: Donn Van Tassel Barclay; December 26, 1892; Ashland, Oregon, U.S.
- Died: October 16, 1975 (aged 82); Palm Springs, California, U.S.
- Resting place: California
- Occupations: Actor; artist; caricaturist
- Years active: 1915–1970

Don Barclay (born Donn Van Tassel Barclay, December 26, 1892 – October 16, 1975) was an American actor, artist and caricaturist whose many roles spanned the period from the Keystone Cops in 1915 to Mary Poppins in 1964 and whose many paintings and caricatures of celebrities filled establishments worldwide and are archived in the Library of Congress.

== Acting career ==
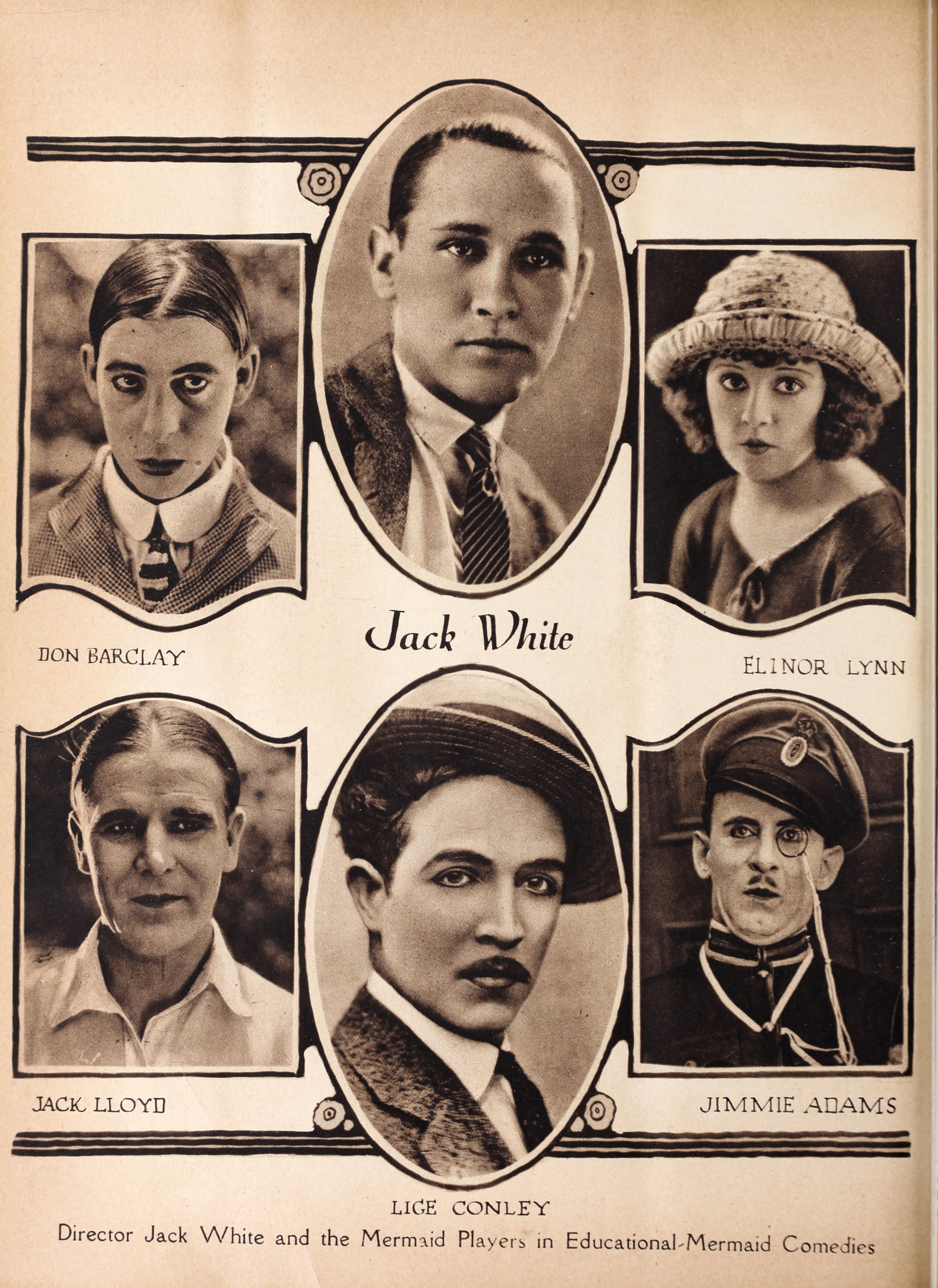
Promotion from 1922 with photos of Jack White (center) and Mermaid Comedies "Players" Don Barclay, Jack Lloyd, Lige Conley, Jimmie Adams and Elinor Lynn

He started his career with the Ziegfeld Follies. Barclay's hundreds of roles included onscreen appearances as well as voice work for Walt Disney, who considered Barclay a good luck charm.

== Artist/Painter ==
Barclay's paintings and caricatures often were painted on the movie lots themselves when he was working with the other actors.

Barclay eventually became such a successful artist caricature painter of celebrities on his movie sets that he eventually was making more money as an artist than as an actor and he left acting to become a full-time artist. He was prolific, turning out hundreds of caricatures of celebrities for saloons all over the nation as well as for servicemen in barracks. Many of his paintings were on display at the Masquers Club in Los Angeles.

Two famous and noted examples of his painted caricatures featuring Bob Hope, "Old Four Eyes" and "Bob Hope and Elf", are featured on the official Library of Congress website devoted to Bob Hope ("Old Four Eyes" is mislabeled in attribution as "Dan Barclay" – "Bob Hope and Elf" is correctly attributed at the bottom of the LOC page).

Actress/director Diane Keaton purchased a clown painting by Barclay which led to her collecting clown paintings and the publication of the book by the actress called Clown Paintings.

Barclay's large paintings are very rare and collectible as few of his larger works survive, while Christie's and other high-profile auction houses have increasingly featured his smaller works such as his painting of Stan Laurel.

Bob Hope collected a series of ceramic mugs featuring Frank Sinatra, Joan Crawford, Jimmy Durante and Lou Costello, produced by Barclay based on his caricatures.

== Friendship with Cary Grant ==
In Bristol, England, Barclay helped and later became roommates with rookie actor Archie Leach, who later gained fame as Cary Grant. Barclay and Leach developed a two-man comedy show in New York. They were often roommates in New York and Hollywood and remained lifelong best friends.

== World War II ==
During the time preceding World War II Barclay spent time with General Claire Lee Chennault's 14th AAF famous Flying Tigers unit (then known as the "China Blitzers") where he illustrated every person in the group.

From October to November 1943, Barclay did a one-man USO show No. 302 for the troops; touring every base in North Africa, Arabia, India, and China with his act and drawing caricatures of the men as he went. When he later returned to China in 1945 he estimated he had drawn over 10,000 caricatures of servicemen.

== Retirement ==
Stan Laurel, in a December 3, 1959 letter to his former secretary, Ernest Murphy, wrote “Do you remember Don Barclay the comic? He called me the other day - he now owns a couple of Motels in Scottsdale, Arizona, so he's doing alright for himself, only trouble is, he suffers a great deal with arthritis poor guy.” By 1970, Barclay had retired and bought a home in the Desert Park Estates neighborhood of Palm Springs, California, where he died.

== Selected filmography ==
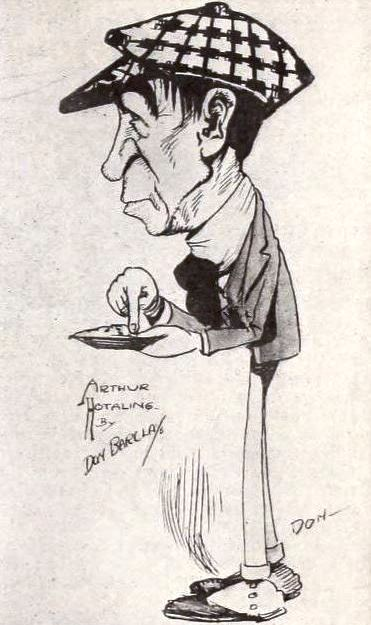
Sketch by Barclay of film director Arthur Hotaling "explaining the gentle art of throwing a custard pie."

- That Little Band of Gold (1915)
- Honky Donkey (1934) as Mr. Barclay
- Frisco Kid (1935) as Drunk (uncredited)
- The Murder of Dr. Harrigan (1935) as Jackson – the drunk
- Man Hunt (1936) as Reporter Waffles
- The Lion's Den (1936) as Paddy Callahan
- Bengal Tiger (1936) as Comic Wrestler (uncredited)
- I Cover the War (1937) as Elmer Davis
- Behind the Mike (1937) as Sparky
- The Spy Ring (1938) as Private Timothy O'Reilly
- Thunder in the Desert (1938) as Rusty
- Accidents Will Happen (1938) as Martin Dorsey – Phoney Drunk Driver
- Outlaw Express (1938) as Sergeant Andy Sharpe
- Valley of the Giants (1938) as Drunk (uncredited)
- The Law West of Tombstone (1938) as The Professor – Texas Rose's Piano Player (uncredited)
- Sweethearts (1938) as Leo's Taxi Driver (uncredited)
- The Oklahoma Kid (1939) as Drunk (uncredited)
- The Flying Irishman (1939) as Bettor (uncredited)
- Badlands of Dakota (1941) as Joe (uncredited)
- Honky Tonk (1941) as Man with Feathers (uncredited)
- South of Tahiti (1941) as Tattooer (uncredited)
- Bedtime Story (1941) as Conventioneer (uncredited)
- Sing Your Worries Away (1942) as Luke Brown (uncredited)
- Blondie's Blessed Event (1942) as Waiter (uncredited)
- Larceny, Inc. (1942) as Drunk Bumped by jug (uncredited)
- This Gun for Hire (1942) as Piano Player (uncredited)
- Mexican Spitfire Sees a Ghost (1942) as Fingers O'Toole
- The Big Street (1942) as Eating Contest Emcee (uncredited)
- Mexican Spitfire's Elephant (1942) as Mr. Smith on the Elephants (uncredited)
- My Sister Eileen (1942) as Drunk (uncredited)
- The Falcon's Brother (1942) as Lefty
- Silver Queen (1942) as Drunk (uncredited)
- Pittsburgh (1942) as Drunk (uncredited)
- Frankenstein Meets the Wolf Man (1943) as Franzec
- After Midnight with Boston Blackie (1943) as Cigar Clerk (uncredited)
- The More the Merrier (1943) as Drunk (uncredited)
- Good Morning, Judge (1943) as Biscuit Face
- Thank You Lucky Stars (1943) as Pete (uncredited)
- Shine On, Harvest Moon (1944) as Coach Driver (uncredited)
- Once Upon a Time (1944) as Photographer (uncredited)
- In Society (1944) as Drowning Drunk (uncredited)
- Practically Yours (1944) as Don Barclay (uncredited)
- Having Wonderful Crime (1945) as Bartender (uncredited)
- Thunder Town (1946) as Bartender Nick (uncredited)
- My Darling Clementine (1946) as Opera House Owner (uncredited)
- Big Town After Dark (1947) as Gambler (uncredited)
- The Sainted Sisters (1948) as Dr. Benton (uncredited)
- Whispering Smith (1948) as Dr. Sawbuck
- Father Was a Fullback (1949) as Grandstand "Coach" (uncredited)
- Cinderella (1950) as Doorman (voice)
- Alice in Wonderland (1951) as Other Cards (voice)
- Peter Pan (1953) (voice)
- Sleeping Beauty (1959) (As live action model for Disney animators to use as a guide) as King Hubert
- One Hundred and One Dalmatians (1961) (voice)
- Mary Poppins (1964) as Mr. Binnacle
- Bedknobs and Broomsticks (1971) as Portobello Road Passerby (uncredited) (final film role)
