= Try and Get It =

1924 film

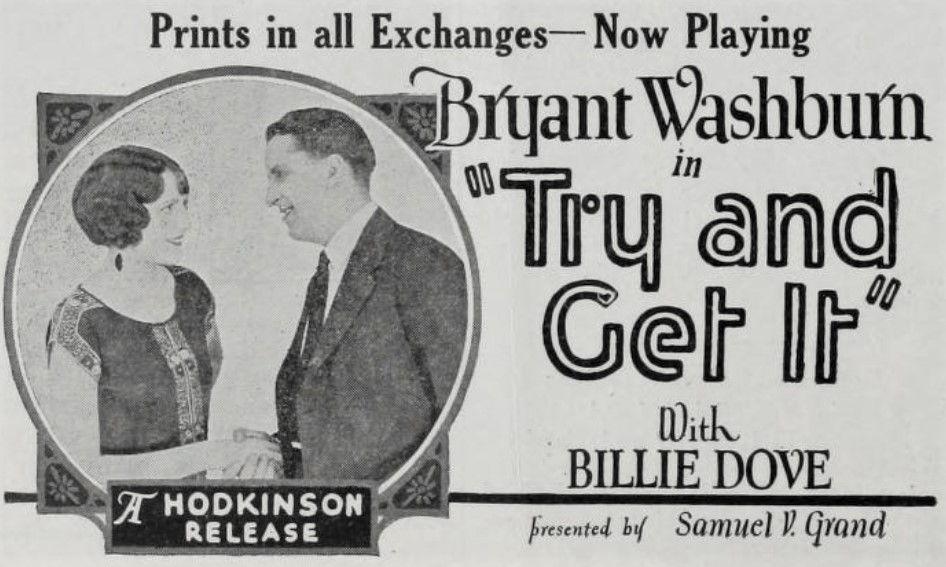
- Advertisement
- Directed by: Cullen Tate
- Written by: Jules Furthman; Eugene P. Lyle Jr.
- Produced by: Samuel Bischoff
- Starring: Bryant Washburn; Billie Dove; Edward Everett Horton
- Production company: Samuel V. Grand
- Distributed by: Producers Distributing Corporation
- Release date: March 9, 1924
- Running time: 60 minutes
- Country: United States
- Language: Silent (English intertitles)

Try and Get It is a 1924 American silent comedy film directed by Cullen Tate and starring Bryant Washburn, Billie Dove, and Edward Everett Horton.

== Plot ==
As described in a film magazine review, Larry Donovan, owner of a printing business, tells his credit manager Joe Merrill that if he cannot collect a seven-year-old bill for $25.11 against Tim Perrin in a week, he is through. Donovan also tells Glenn Collins that if he does not get Perrin's account within a week, he is through, too. Both young men are thrown out of Perrin's cement yard. Joe goes to a modiste shop owned by Perrin, ready to park there until he receives payment. He makes various attempts to see Perrin, who finally beats him up and wrecks the shop. When Merrill wins the love of Perrin's daughter and, with her connivance, finally secures the payment of the bill, Perrin capitulates and offers him a job.

== Cast ==
- Bryant Washburn as Joseph Merrill
- Billie Dove as Rhoda Perrin
- Edward Everett Horton as Glenn Collins
- Joseph Kilgour as Larry Donovan
- Lionel Belmore as Timothy Perrin
- Rose Dione as Madame Florio
- Hazel Deane as Telephone Operator
- Carl Stockdale as Bookkeeper

== Preservation ==
A print of Try and Get It is held in the Library of Congress collection.

== Bibliography ==
- Monaco, James. The Encyclopedia of Film. Perigee Books, 1991.
