= Mary of the Movies =

1923 silent film by John McDermott

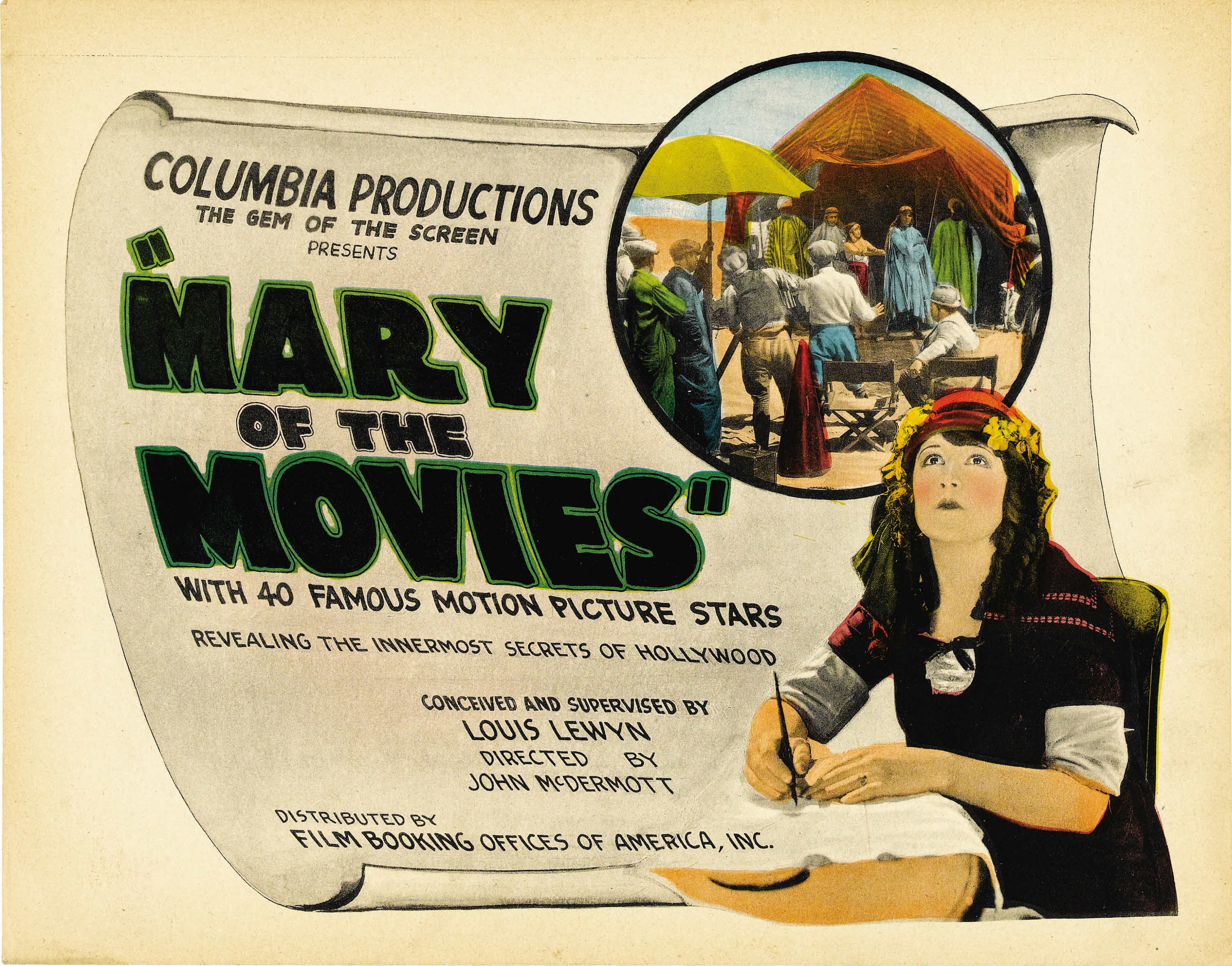
- Lobby card
- Directed by: John McDermott
- Story by: Louis Lewyn; Marion Mack
- Produced by: Louis Lewyn; Jack Cohen
- Starring: Marion Mack; Creighton Hale
- Cinematography: George Meehan; Vernon L. Walker
- Production company: CBC Film Sales Corporation
- Distributed by: Film Booking Offices
- Release date: May 22, 1923 (U.S.)
- Running time: 6 or 7 reels; 6,449 or 6,500 feet
- Language: Silent (English intertitles)

Mary of the Movies is a 1923 American silent semi-autobiographical comedy film based on the career of Marion Mack. It was written by Mack and her husband Louis Lewyn, and stars Mack and Creighton Hale. Hale and director John McDermott play fictionalized versions of themselves in the film, which was also directed by McDermott.

It was produced by the CBC Film Sales Corporation (which would later become Columbia Pictures) and distributed by Film Booking Offices. A partial print of the film exists in Ngā Taonga Sound & Vision.

== Plot ==
Mary, a country girl, moves to Hollywood to become a star, and earn money to pay for her brother's operation. She meets many famous stars, but has difficulty getting work. Finally, she gets a break when her resemblance to a star leads to her being cast in a film.

== Cast ==
Principals

- Marion Mack as Mary, the girl
- Florence Lee as her mother
- Mary Kane as her sister
- Jack Perrin as Jack, her brother
- Harry Cornelli as "Lait" Mayle, the postman
- John Geough as Reel S. Tate, the squire
- Raymond Cannon as Oswald Tate, his son
- Ray Hanford as the old man
- Rosemary Cooper as Jane, the extra girl
- Creighton Hale as himself, the boy
- Francis McDonald as James Seiler, a salesman
- Henry Burrows as the producer
- John McDermott as the director

Celebrity cameos

- David Butler
- Marjorie Daw
- Elliott Dexter
- Louise Fazenda
- Alec B. Francis
- Wanda Hawley
- Rex Ingram
- J. Warren Kerrigan
- Barbara La Marr
- Edward LeSaint
- Bessie Love
- Douglas MacLean
- Tom Moore
- Carmel Myers
- ZaSu Pitts
- Herbert Rawlinson
- Anita Stewart
- Estelle Taylor
- Rosemary Theby
- Maurice Tourneur
- Richard Travers
- Johnnie Walker
- Bryant Washburn

== Production ==
It was shot at Sunset Gower Studios.

== Reception ==
The film received good reviews, and did well at the box office. It was deemed better than a similar film released the same year, named Hollywood.

== Preservation and status ==
An incomplete copy of the film is held at the University of California, Los Angeles from a print sent from the New Zealand Film Archive.
