= Marion Mack =

American actress and scriptwriter

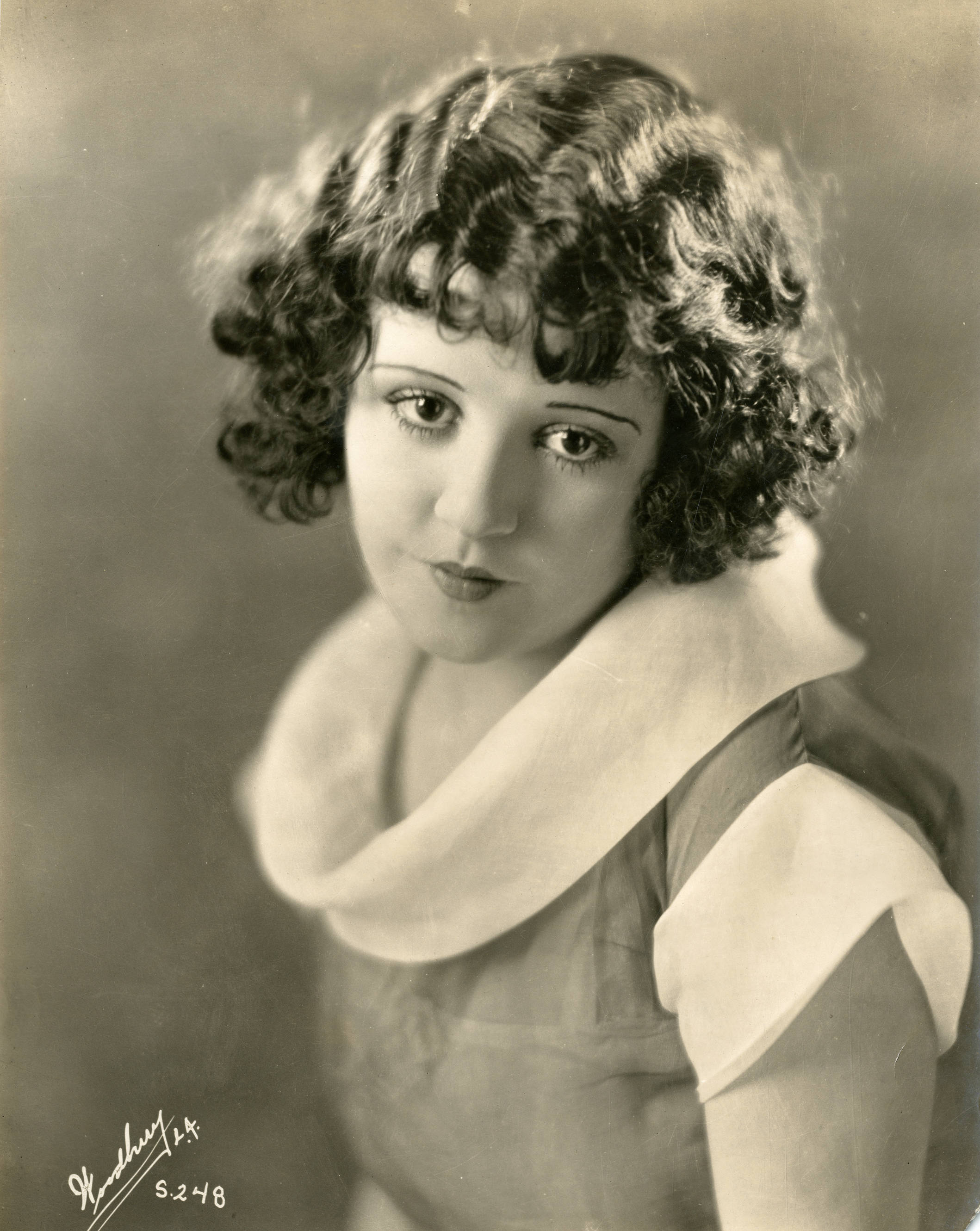
- Mack in 1922
- Born: Joey Marion McCreery; April 8, 1902; Mammoth, Utah, U.S.
- Died: May 1, 1989 (aged 87); Costa Mesa, California, U.S.
- Resting place: Pacific View Memorial Park
- Other names: Elinor Lynn
- Occupations: Actress, screenwriter, real estate broker
- Notable work: Annabelle in The General (1926)
- Spouse: Louis Lewyn (m. 1924; died 1969)
- Children: 1

Joey Marion McCreery Lewyn (April 8, 1902 – May 1, 1989), known professionally as Marion Mack, was an American film actress and screenwriter. Mack is best known for co-starring with Buster Keaton in the 1926 silent comedy film The General. After retiring from acting in 1928, she wrote several short screenplays and took up a career in real estate.

== Film career ==
Mack was born Joey Marion McCreery in Mammoth, Utah. After graduating from high school, she sent a letter and a photograph to director Mack Sennett expressing her desire to be an actress. Sennett's manager wrote back informing McCreery that they would give her an interview if she ever came to Hollywood. McCreery, her father and her stepmother traveled to Hollywood shortly thereafter and sneaked into Sennett's Keystone Studios. Much to her father's disapproval, Mack was hired by Sennett as a "bathing beauty" for $25 a week. Her film debut was in On a Summer Day (1921).

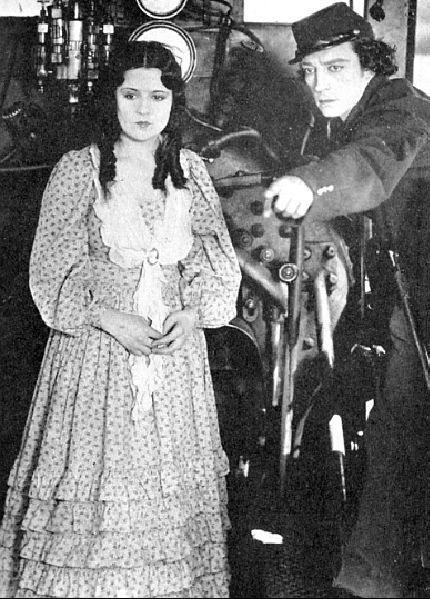
Mack and Keaton in The General

In films, McCreery initially used her own name. Between 1921 and 1922 she used the name Elinor Lynn in several short films directed by Jack White, co-starring with Lige Conley and Jimmie Adams. By 1923 she had adopted the stage name Marion Mack.

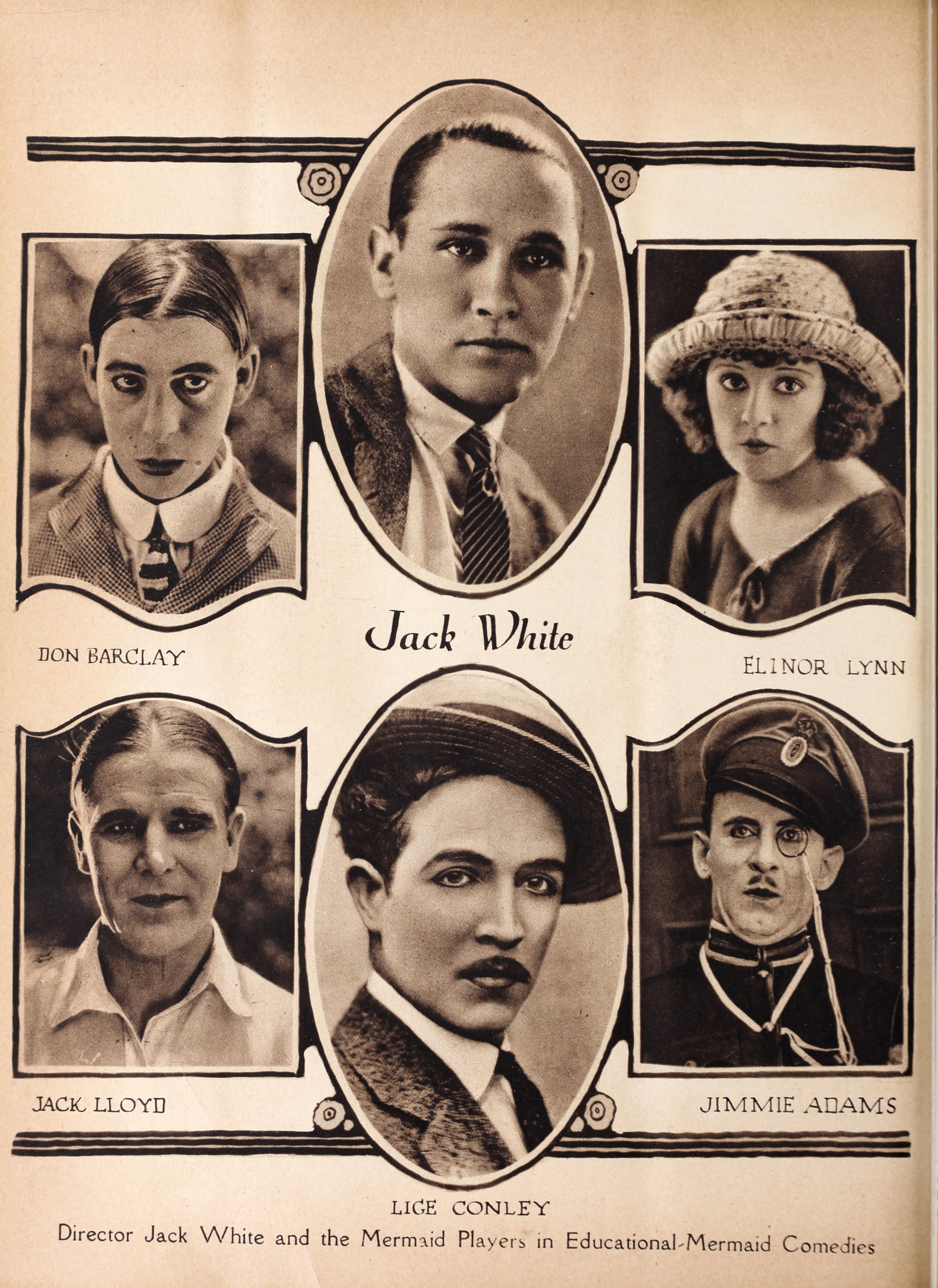
Promotion from 1922 with photos of Jack White (center) and Mermaid Comedies "Players" Don Barclay, Jack Lloyd, Lige Conley, Jimmie Adams and Elinor Lynn

After appearing in several short films for Sennett, she left Keystone and signed on to make Mermaid Comedies for $100 a week. While at Mermaid, she appeared in various comedy shorts. She also worked at Universal where she had roles in several Westerns. She returned to Mermaid after a year.

In 1923, she co-wrote and appeared in a semi-autobiographical film, Mary of the Movies. Mary of the Movies was a box office success and Mack went on to leading roles in the action/crime-drama One of the Bravest (1925) and the drama Carnival Girl (1926). In 1926 she was cast in her best known role as Annabelle Lee, the estranged girlfriend of Buster Keaton's character, Johnnie Gray, in the American Civil War comedy film The General. The film was a moderate success but failed to make a profit because the budget was high. Mack appeared in her final film Alice in Movieland, in 1928.

Mack gave up acting after appearing in Alice in Movieland because she found the strain of filming for such long periods to be too taxing (The General was shot over a six-month period in Oregon). After her retirement from acting, she began a career as a screenwriter and penned scripts for short films for Metro-Goldwyn-Mayer and Warner Bros. Mack's husband, producer Louis Lewyn, produced the films. One of the films she scripted was directed by Keaton, the 1938 short Streamlined Swing.

== Later years ==
By the 1940s, short films began to fall out of favor and Mack's husband's health was declining. In 1949, she took up yet another career as a real estate broker in Orange County, California. Mack and her husband settled in Costa Mesa, California. The couple also owned an estate in Beverly Hills and continued to socialize with people whom they met when they worked in the film industry, including Rudy Vallee and Clara Bow.

In 1970, due to renewed interest in The General, film historian Raymond Rohauer tracked Mack down at her Costa Mesa home. While the film was not a commercial or critical success when it was first released, it later found an audience and has since become cited as one of Buster Keaton's greatest films. To support the film, Mack attended screenings of The General at various film festivals until heart problems prevented her from traveling. In 1978, Mack suffered two heart attacks. She appeared in the documentary series Hollywood (1980), in which she discussed her experience filming The General.

== Personal life ==
Mack met producer Lewis Lewyn after winning a beauty contest at the Thomas H. Ince Studios. They married in 1923 and had one child, a son named Lannie. Mack and Lewyn remained married until Lewyn's death in 1969.

On May 1, 1989, Mack died of heart failure in Costa Mesa, California at the age of 87. After a private funeral, Mack was buried in Pacific View Memorial Park in Corona del Mar, Newport Beach.

== Filmography ==
Year	Title	Role	Notes
1921	On a Summer Day	Farmerette	Short subject Credited as Joey McCreery
1921	Reputation	Ingenue (stage sequence)	Credited as Joey McCreery; Lost film
1921	The Cowpuncher's Comeback	Betty Thompson	Short subject Credited as Joey McCreery
1923	Mary of the Movies	Mary	Scenario
1925	One of the Bravest	Sarah Levine	
1926	The Carnival Girl	Nannette	
1926	The General	Annabelle Lee	
1928	Alice in Movieland	Alice	
1938	Streamlined Swing	–	Short subject Screenwriter
1940	Alice in Movieland	Well-Wisher at Train Station	Uncredited
1940	Rodeo Dough	–	Short subject Screenwriter
1942	Soaring Stars	–	Short subject Screenwriter
