= Richard Emory =

American actor (1919–1994)

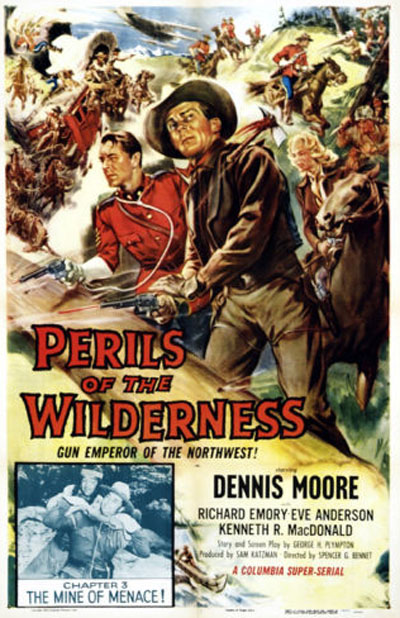
- 1953 Perils of the Wilderness movie poster
- Born: Emory Waldemar Johnson; January 27, 1919; Santa Barbara, California, US
- Died: February 15, 1994 (aged 75); Moab, Utah, US
- Other names: Dick Emory; Emory Johnson; Emory Waldman
- Occupations: Film, television actor
- Years active: 1949–1963
- Notable credits: Perils of the Wilderness; Gene Autry and the Mounties
- Television: The Cisco Kid; The Roy Rogers Show
- Spouses: Elizabeth Graham (m. 1940, divorced); Margaret L Besancon (m. 1952, divorced); Ila Ferguson (m. 1960)
- Parents: Emory Johnson (father); Ella Hall (mother)

Richard Emory (January 27, 1919 – February 15, 1994) was an American actor born in Santa Barbara, California. After serving in the military as a marine in World War II, he started a career as an actor. He achieved recognition in movies of the 1950s and 1960s and also found work as a supporting actor in various television serials. He was the oldest son of Silent Film celebrity couple - Emory Johnson and Ella Hall. After his birth, a brother and two sisters would follow. Emory retired from show business in 1963 and would spend the rest of his life working odd jobs. He died in February 1994 in Moab, Utah.

== Early years ==
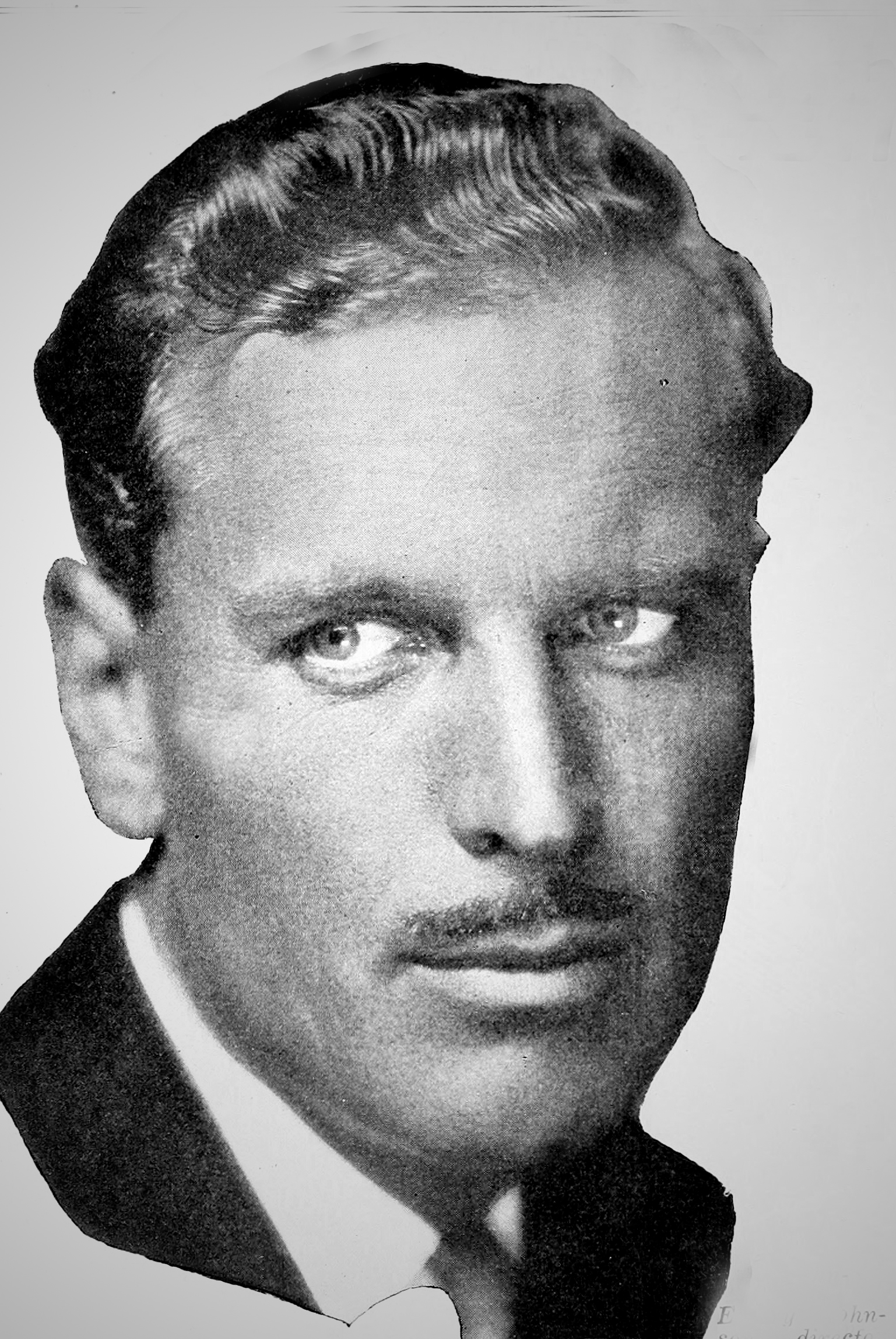
Emory Johnson

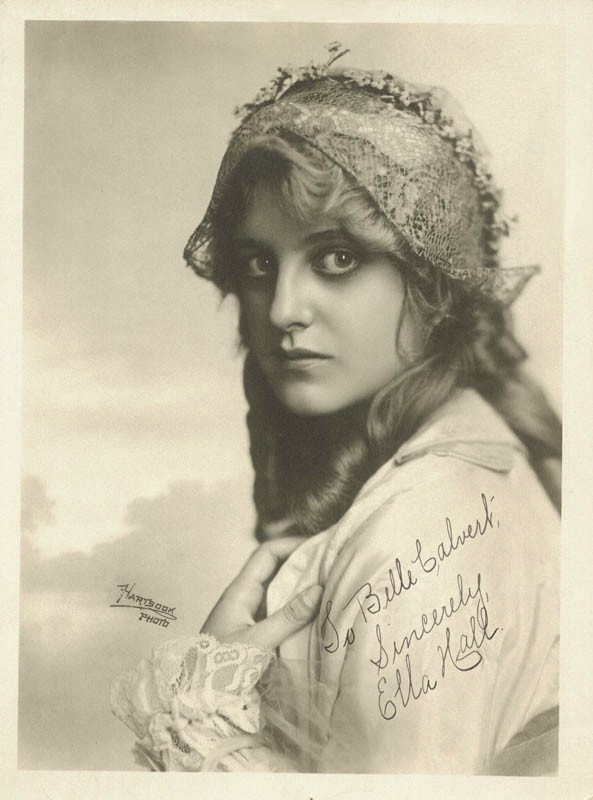
Ella Hall

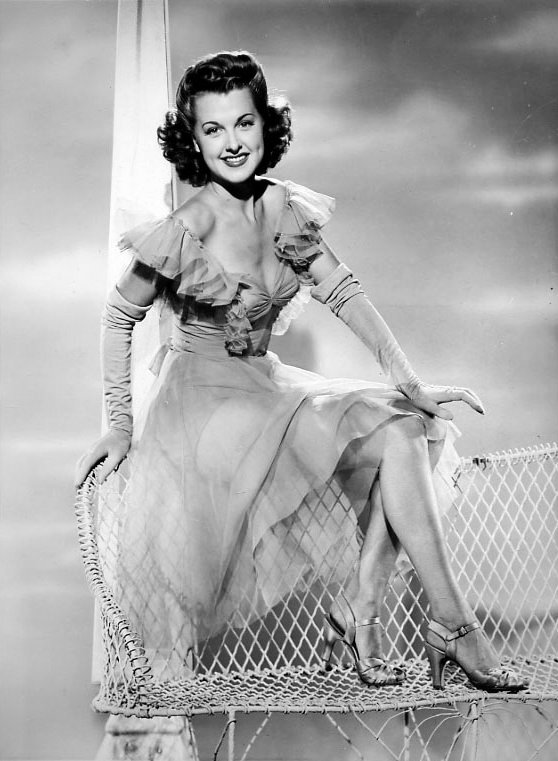
Ellen Hall

Richard Emory was born Emory Waldemar Johnson Jr. in Santa Barbara, California, on January 27, 1919.

Johnson's father was a Universal actor named Emory Johnson. His mother was Universal Pictures' ingénue Ella Hall. In 1917, while both actors were under contract with Universal, they married in a private ceremony. After their honeymoon, the couple moved into Emory Johnson's Los Angeles home along with Johnson's mother, Emilie Johnson. In 1918, Universal failed to renew Johnson and Hall's contracts. Emory Johnson continued as a free agent working on films. Hall's last movie before giving birth to Emory Waldemar was Three Mounted Men, released on October 7, 1918. Hall would not make another film until 1921.

Johnson's father, Emory Johnson, was 24 years old when Emory Waldemar was born, and his mother, Ella Hall, was 22. Emory's brother, Alfred Barnard, was born on September 26, 1920. His oldest sister, Ellen Joanna, was born on April 18, 1923. By 1924, the Johnson marriage was crumbling, and Hall filed for divorce. Emory Johnson asked Hall to give the marriage one more try.

Tragedy struck in March 1926. While Ella and the kids were crossing a busy street in Hollywood, Emory Waldemar's 5-year-old brother Alfred was struck and killed by a truck. The vehicle narrowly missed Emory. The accident fueled a reconciliation and Emory's parents decided to have one last child. Emory's sister, Diana Marie (Dinie), was born on October 27, 1929.

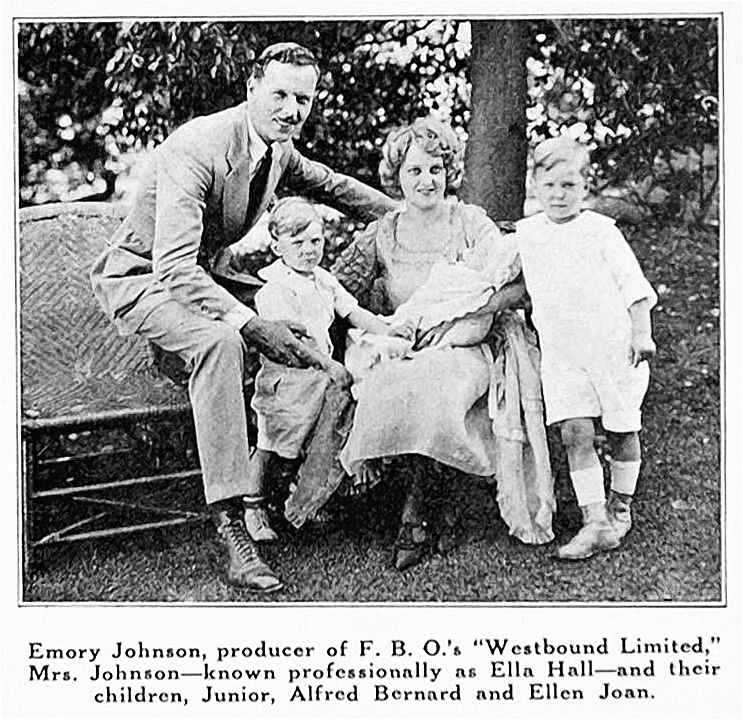

Since 1924, Emory Waldemar's parents had publicly battled over alimony payments, child support, visitation, and living conditions. The Johnson's on-again and off-again relationship finally exhausted itself, and they finalized their divorce in 1930. Ella Hall and her three children moved in with Hall's mother. Hall started a sales job at the upscale ladies' dress shop, I. Magnin, to support her three children. Hall's job paid well, and the kids had a comfortable upbringing.

Yet, Hall would continue spending time in court contesting support payments. In 1932, Emory Johnson filed for bankruptcy, allowing him to lower his payments for Hall and the kids. This bickering was a major factor in the children's estrangement from their father.

At age ten, Emory Waldemar had an uncredited role in the 1930 Universal production of All Quiet on the Western Front released on April 21, 1930. Emory's sister, Ellen Joanna, age seven, claimed she played a young girl in the same movie.

The book The Encyclopedia of Feature Players of Hollywood, Volume 1, contains an interview with Richard Emory. He recalls his small part in All Quiet on the Western Front and his mother's role, playing an uncredited nurse. He did not remember his sister ever being on the set. We should note Johnson's recollections were forty years after the experience. He would have another uncredited part in the 1941 production of I Wanted Wings.

== Military ==
The German invasion of Poland on September 1, 1939, signaled the opening of World War II. On September 3, 1939, Britain and France declared war on Germany. Although the United States did not participate in the initial declaration of war, certain visionaries thought something would ultimately drag the United States into the unfolding global hostilities.

One indisputable fact was that the United States military was unprepared to engage in any global war. National polls indicated an increasing majority of citizens were in favor of establishing a military draft. Bowing to this ever-increasing sentiment, Congress passed the Selective Training and Service Act of 1940, also known as the Burke–Wadsworth Act, Pub. L. 76–783, 54 Stat. 885, enacted September 16, 1940. It would become the first peacetime conscription in United States history. Franklin D. Roosevelt signed the bill into law on September 16, 1940.

The Selective Service Act required all men born between October 17, 1909, and October 16, 1919 (ages 21–35) living in the continental United States to register with local draft boards. The act of draft registration did not create any military enlistment. National lotteries established enlistment dates. The first national lottery occurred on October 29, 1940.

Wednesday, October 16, 1940, also known as R-Day, was the date all men between ages 21 and 35 were required to register for the draft. In North Hollywood, Emory Johnson Jr. stood in line to register at Selective Service Local Board 179. Other stars signing up at the local board included Henry Fonda, Don Ameche, Lon Chaney Jr., and Robert Taylor. Johnson registered using his full birth name of Emory Waldemar Johnson. According to his paperwork, he was a private in the Marine Corps Reserve. His draft card shows Johnson lived in North Hollywood, was twenty-one, six feet tall, weighed one hundred-sixty-two pounds, and had blue eyes and blond hair. His draft card was proof he had registered, and they advised him to keep it with him at all times.

Johnson enlisted in the Marine Corps Reserve on November 7, 1940. On December 8, 1941, the United States declares war on Japan. On December 11, 1941 the United States declares war on Germany and Italy. World War II ranged on until 1945.

Victory in Europe Day (also known as V-E Day) marked the official end of World War II in Europe and is celebrated on May 8, 1945, Victory over Japan Day (also known as V-J Day) marked the official end of World War II and is celebrated on September 2, 1945. Johnson's Military Discharge date is listed as September 12, 1945. He was discharged from Marine Corps as Private First Class Quartermaster clerk.

== Career ==
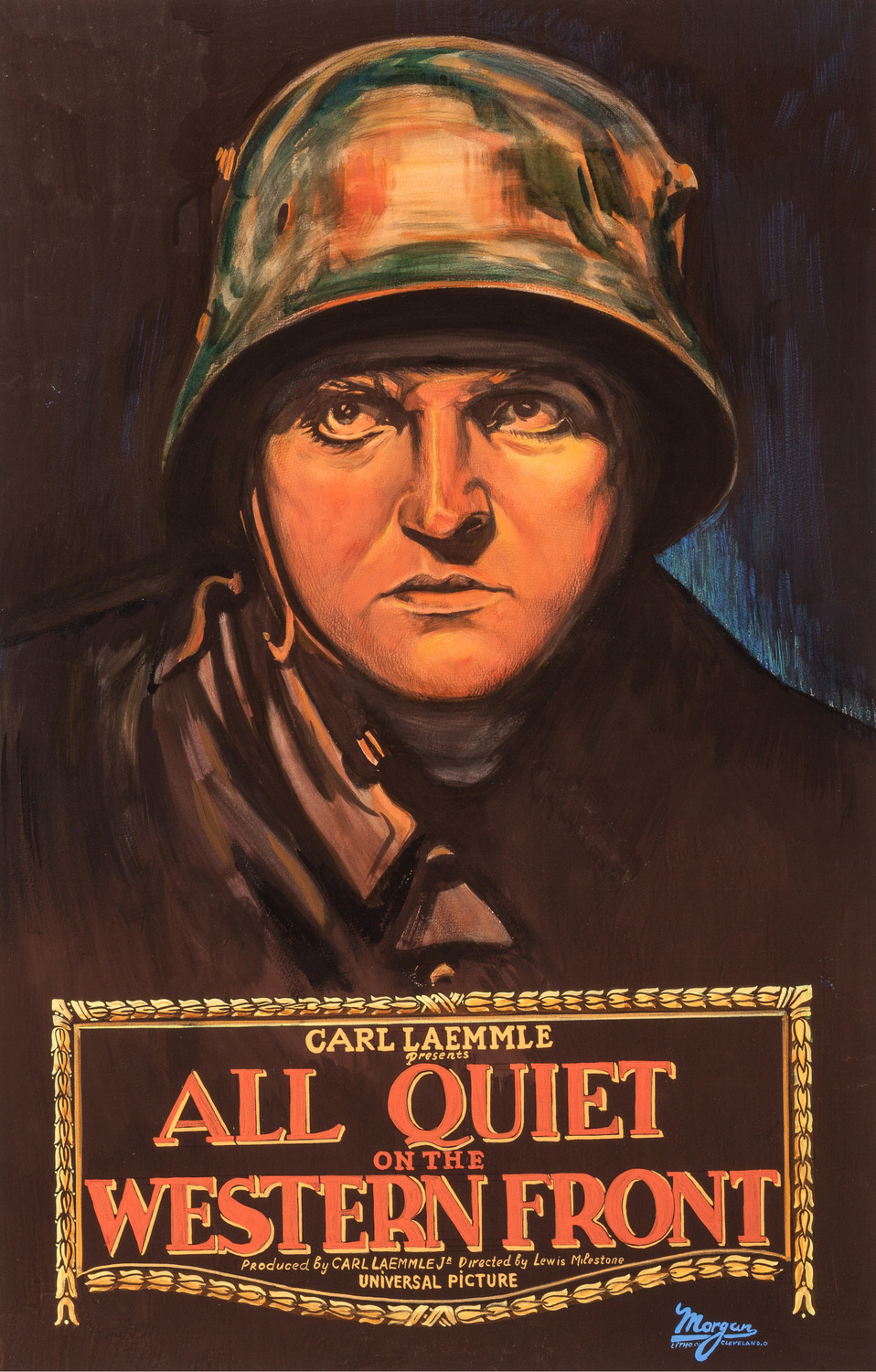
Movie Poster

Johnson's first foray into acting was the 1930 film, "All Quiet on the Western Front." In an interview published in The Encyclopedia of Feature Players of Hollywood, Volume 1, Johnson stated, "When he was about eleven years old, he accompanied his mother to the set of All Quiet on the Western Front. 'I went down to the location in Laguna,' he recalled. 'The trenches and everything was so realistic it was frightening. Mother worked on it for a few days in the hospital scene, where she played a nurse. I guess I was of age, and they had me throw a vase of flowers in a scene and hit the door; they may have cut it out.'"

Johnson claimed he started acting in 1938 when he was 18 and still attending High School. Johnson's first play was named "Judgment Day" and he played the character, Nekludov, the Lieutenant of the guards. The play was staged at a local theatre called the Santa Monica Players.

Before his enlistment on November 7, 1940, he landed a part in the film I Wanted Wings. Principal photography occurred between August 26 and December 19, 1940, and Paramount Pictures released the film on March 26, 1941. The movie featured Ray Milland, William Holden, and Veronica Lake. Johnson's part was uncredited.

Richard Emory's younger sister, Ellen Joanna Johnson (Ellen Hall), was born in 1923. Hall's first role in a movie was an uncredited young girl in "All Quiet on the Western Front." She was six years old. While Johnson served in the Marines, Ellen Hall made her cinematic debut with an uncredited part in the musical The Chocolate Soldier, released on October 31, 1941. Hall was 18 years old. Johnson's sister acted in various genres until she found her niche in B movie Westerns. In 1943, Hall got her first female lead in a Western titled Outlaws of Stampede Pass. She would continue acting throughout the 1940s and into the early 1950s. Her last role in a Western was the 1949 production of Lawless Code.

After his discharge from the marines on September 12, 1945, Johnson took a job in the wholesale florist business in San Francisco. He remained employed for a year and a half. He stated, "I decided that wasn't for me and came down to Los Angeles and studied at Gilliard's Playhouse. I was there for two years. My sister was in the business and introduced me to an agent who took me on, but it was very unfortunate because he didn't know how to build anyone."

When he left Gilliard's Playhouse, his "rugged good looks" landed him a job as a runway and media model. He used modeling to supplement his income because of the lack of receiving a steady pay check generated from movie parts. The period from the late 1940s to the 1950s has been called the "Golden Age of the Western." Johnson returned to the movie business with his first credited role in South of Death Valley, released on August 8, 1949. His next film was the Bandit King of Texas, released on August 29, 1949. He acted in both films using his new Screen moniker of Richard Emory. In 1950, he made three more movies.

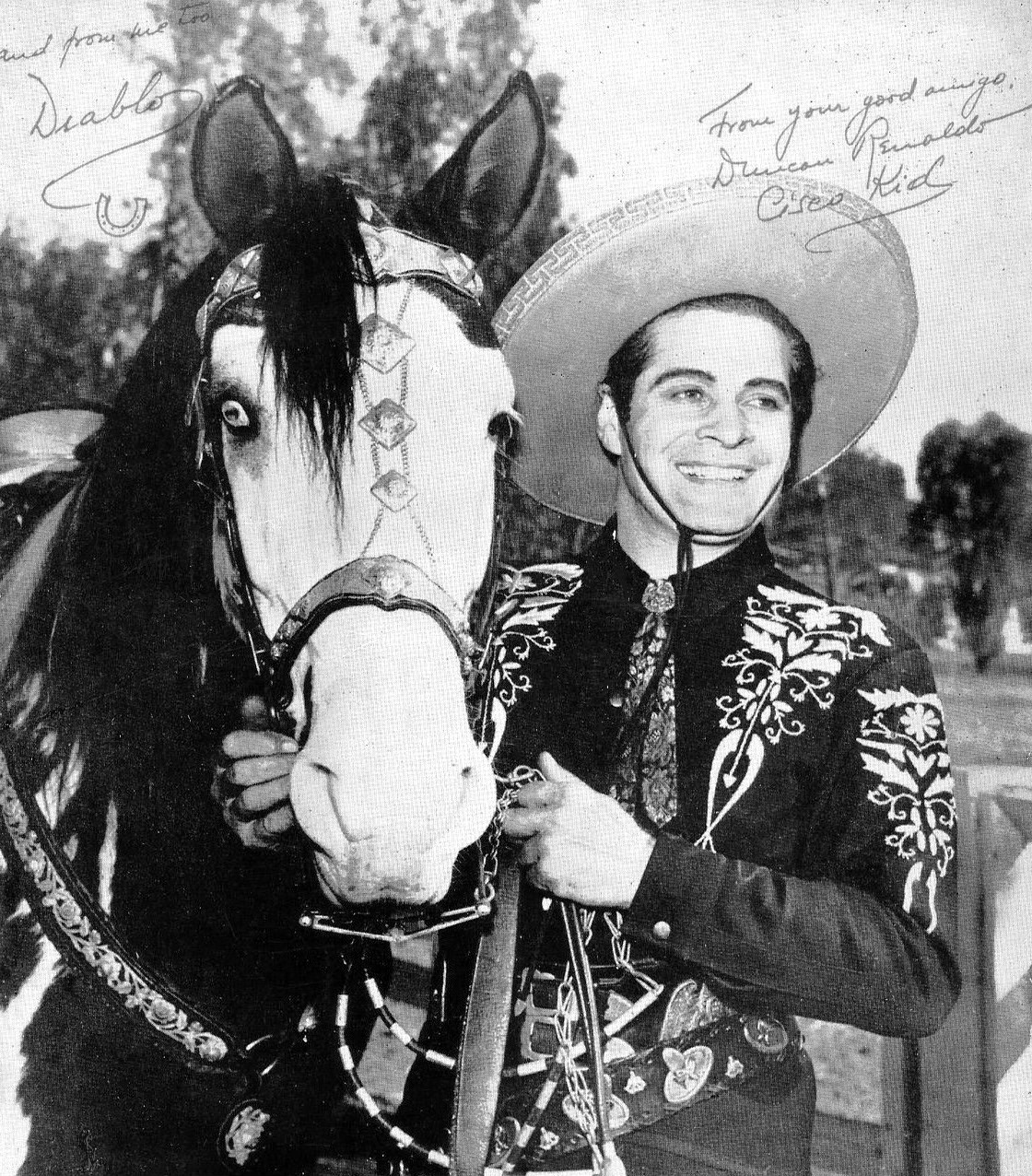
The Cisco Kid

After her marriage in 1944, Hall's movie career wound down. In 1950, she found work on the television series, The Cisco Kid. She appeared in three episodes of The Cisco Kid, airing on December 19, 1950, January 27, 1951, and September 3, 1951. While Hall was working on The Cisco Kid, her brother was in the initial stages of his budding acting career. Emory also found work in the same television series, although the two never appeared together. Emory acted in episodes aired on December 12, 1950, and January 2, 1951. In 1952, Ellen Hall retired from acting. She was 29 years old.

Emory acted in various movie genres, including adventure, comedy, science fiction, Westerns, and musicals. A full third of his artistic output was in the Western genre. These films included Code of the Silver Sage, Gene Autry and the Mounties, Little Big Horn, Hellgate and Perils of the Wilderness. On television, a third of his output was westerns, including roles in "The Cisco Kid", "The Roy Rogers Show", "Bat Masterson", "The Gene Autry Show" and "The Adventures of Rin Tin Tin".

Between 1930 and 1961, Emory acted in thirty-two movies. One-third of his movie output was Westerns. He made ten straight westerns starting in 1949 with South of Death Valley and finishing with Perils of the Wilderness released in January 1956. Richard Emory's last movie was The Sergeant Was a Lady, a comedy released in October 1961. Fourteen of his movie roles were uncredited. During his acting career, he also had thirty-eight television appearances. One-half of those roles were in westerns.

Emory was 44 years old when he retired from acting. His final role was playing an intern in the television series "Perry Mason". Episode 180 aired on May 9, 1963.

== Post career ==
His third and final Marriage in Los Angeles, California on February 7, 1960, to Ila Irene Ferguson.

In 1963, after acting in the Perry Mason episode, he walked away from his acting career at the age of 44. After Johnson retired from acting, he sold insurance and real estate. "If I thought it was a great house I could sell it," Johnson stated, but his wife added, "He was just as inclined to say 'I don't think you'd like this', so that was that."

In 1966, Johnson "went to Valley College and worked for ten years in landscape and gardening. " In 1976, Emory retired from his job at the college at the age of 57. In 1980 they moved to the small community of Jemez Springs, New Mexico. Here Emory enjoyed "working in his garden where he grew yams, various hot chilies, and just loved to garden and grow things."

In the early 1990s they moved to Moab, Utah. The move explains why Johnson is listed on the "Brief Biographies of Latter Day Saint and Utah Film Personalities" website. The listing is based on being a Film Personality living in Utah, not necessarily being a member of the LDS church. (Note: The religious affiliation is not known for many of the individuals listed in this section, but they are listed because they are Utahns or Utah residents (or were previously). Statistically, most of the people for whom no affiliation is identified are members of the Church of Jesus Christ of Latter-day Saints (Mormons), but many are not. The aim of this section is to provide a broad listing of Utah film industry professionals, as well as film industry professionals who are LDS (Mormon). Many film producers, directors, etc. use this resource to assist them in casting and "crewing up" for film productions and finding local individuals with needed specialties and skills.) Emory Waldemar Johnson died in 1994.

== Marriage ==
Johnson was married three times. In 1940, he was living with his mother and two sisters when he turned twenty-one. On October 16, 1940, Johnson registered for the draft, then enlisted in the Marine Corps reserves in November. He was home for Christmas in December 1940.

=== Marriage 1940 ===
Johnson's first marriage was to Elizabeth Catherine Graham of Beverly Hills, California. The wedding had earmarks of a rushed decision to elope. They were married in Yuma, Arizona, on December 27, 1940. Both were 21, celebrated the same birthdate, and traveled 300 miles from Los Angeles to Yuma for a quick marriage. Why get married in Yuma?

Getting a marriage license in Arizona was pretty easy compared with other states. In Arizona, there was no waiting period or blood tests. You could get married the same day you apply for your marriage license. Many anxious Californians eloped to Arizona to avoid the California three-day waiting period.

Love languished; sometime between April 12, 1949, and April 12, 1950, they divorced. In the 1950 Census, dated April 13, 1950, Johnson claims he was Never Married (Single) and was an unemployed actor. Later in the form, Emory stated he had been married previously and only divorced less than one year. There were no children. After his enlistment and marriage, he still found time to act in the movie, I Wanted Wings. Paramount released the picture on March 26, 1941.

=== Marriage 1952 ===
Emory spent countless hours doing Location shooting in the town of Pioneertown, California. The location was used extensively to stage western productions. Richard met his second wife while on location for the movie Gene Autry and the Mounties released in January 1951.

Emory Waldemar Johnson married his second wife, Margaret L. Lafontaine Besancon, in Los Angeles, California, on January 26, 1952. At the time he was 32 and she was 26. There are two entries in the California Department of Health and Welfare for the Johnson 1952 marriage. The first marriage registration was to Margaret Lois Lafontaine. This entry was the women's maiden name. The second entry was to Margaret Lois Besancon. This entry was her married name after her first marriage. In 1945, Margaret Lafontaine, age 19, married Guillaume de Besancon in Yuma, Arizona. He was 20 years old. They had two sons, Michael, born in 1946, and Stephen, born in 1948.

When Johnson's marriage to Besancon ended, they had no children of their own. She remarried in 1957.

=== Marriage 1960 ===
Emory Waldemar Johnson married his third wife Ila Irene Ferguson in Los Angeles, California, on February 7, 1960. Johnson was 41 and she was also 41. This marriage endured, and they were still married at the time of his death in 1994. She died in Moab, Utah, in 2003.

== Death ==
Emory Waldemar Johnson died of a stroke on February 15, 1994, in Moab, Utah. He was 75 years old. Unlike his parents and two siblings, he chose not to be interred with the rest of the family at Forest Lawn Memorial Park in California. Emory had a non-cemetery burial in Utah. The exact location was not disclosed.

Emory's father died in San Mateo, California on April 18, 1960 from burns suffered in a fire. He was 66 years old. Emory's mother was residing in Los Angeles, California at the time of her death on September 3, 1981. She was 84 years old.

== Filmography ==
◆ Filmography of Richard Emory (32) ◆
Year	Film	Production	Distribution	Genre	Length	Credit	Released	Notes
1930	All Quiet on the Western Front	Universal	Universal	War	Feature	Little Boy	1930-04-21	Uncredited
1941	I Wanted Wings	Paramount	Paramount	Drama	Feature	Sergeant	1941-03-26	Uncredited
1949	South of Death Valley	Columbia	Columbia	Western	Feature	Tommy Tavish	1949-08-08	
1949	Bandit King of Texas	Republic	Republic	Western	Feature	Jim Baldwin	1949-08-29	
1950	Code of the Silver Sage	Republic	Republic	Western	Feature	Lt. John Case	1950-03-25	
1950	Destination Murder	Prominent	RKO	Crime	Feature	Police Sgt. Mulcahy	1950-06-06	
1950	Brooklyn Buckaroos	RKO	RKO	Comedy	Short	Blackjack Dawson	1950	
1951	Korea Patrol	Schwarz Prod	Eagle-Lion	War	Feature	Lt. Craig	1951-01-15	
1951	Gene Autry and the Mounties	Autry Prod	Columbia	Western	Feature	Constable Terry Dillon	1951-01-15	
1951	Fingerprints Don't Lie	Neufeld	Lippert	Crime	Feature	Paul Moody	1951-02-23	
1951	Mask of the Dragon	Neufeld	Lippert	War	Feature	Lt. Daniel Oliver	1951-03-10	
1951	Little Big Horn	Lippert	Lippert	Western	Feature	Pvt. Mitch Shovels	1951-06-15	
1951	FBI Girl	Jadger	Lippert	Noir	Feature	Electron Man	1951-11-04	Uncredited
1951	Lawless Cowboys	Frontier	Monogram	Western	Feature	Henchman Jeff	1951-11-07	Uncredited
1952	Captive of Billy the Kid	Republic	Republic	Western	Feature	Henchman Sam	1952-01-21	
1952	Sailor Beware	Paramount	Paramount	Crime	Feature	Petty Officer	1952-02-09	Uncredited
1952	Singin' in the Rain	MGM	Loew's	Musical	Feature	Phil	1952-03-27	Uncredited
1952	Red Snow	All American	Columbia	Adventure	Feature	Lt. Stone	1952-07-07	
1952	Hellgate	Champion	Lippert	Western	Feature	Dan Mott	1952-08-05	
1952	Battle Zone	Wanger Prod	Allied Artists	War	Feature	Lt. Mike Orlin	1952-10-26	
1952	Flat Top	Mirisch	Monogram	War	Feature	Intelligence Officer	1952-10-26	Uncredited
1952	Wyoming Roundup	Fennelly	Monogram	Western	Feature	Jack Craven	1952-11-09	
1953	Count the Hours	Bogeaus	RKO	Noir	Feature	Reporter	1953-04-01	Uncredited
1954	The Last Time I Saw Paris	MGM	Loew's	Romance	Feature	American Officer	1954-11-18	Uncredited
1955	The Glass Slipper	MGM	Loew's	Musical	Feature	Young Man	1955-03-24	Uncredited
1955	Seven Angry Men	Allied Artists	Allied Artists	Drama	Feature	Stevens	1955-03-27	Uncredited
1955	The Crooked Web	Clover Prod	Columbia	Noir	Feature	Doc Mason	1955-11-30	
1956	Perils of the Wilderness	Katzman Prod	Columbia	Western	Feature	Sergeant Gray	1956-01-06	
1957	Beginning of the End	AB-PT Pict	Republic	Sci Fy	Feature	Lieutenant	1957-06-28	Uncredited
1957	Man of a Thousand Faces	Universal	Universal	Drama	Feature	Bullpen Asst Dir	1957-08-13	Uncredited
1957	My Man Godfrey	Universal	Universal	Comedy	Feature	Minor Role	1957-10-11	Uncredited
1961	The Sergeant Was a Lady	Twincraft	Universal	Comedy	Feature	Maj. Zilker	1961-10-04	

== Television ==
◆ Television Roles of Richard Emory (38) ◆
Year(s)	Title	Episode(s)	Genre	Role
1950–51	The Cisco Kid	Three Episodes	Western	Terry Ryan
1952	The Roy Rogers Show	Two Episodes	Western	Sloan / Deputy Cliff
1952	The Unexpected	The Numbers Game	Mystery	
1952	Racket Squad	One Episode	Crime	Dan Kelly
1953	Death Valley Days	The Death Valley Kid	Western	
1953	Death Valley Days	Which Side of the Fence	Western	Sheriff Martin Bisbee
1953	The Gene Autry Show	Two Episodes	Western	Jeff Carter
1953	The Range Rider	Outlaw Territory	Western	Lieutenant Stone
1954	I Led 3 Lives	The Kid	Drama	Blaisdall
1954-55	The Adventures of Rin Tin Tin	Three Episodes	Western	Lt. Matthew Sharp
1955	Walt Disney's Wonderful World of Color	Man and the Moon	Sci Fy	Rocket Ship Crew
1956	Private Secretary	Passing the Buck	Comedy	Young Playwright
1956	Ethel Barrymore Theatre	Justice for All	Drama	
1957	Circus Boy	Corky's Big Parade	Adventure	John Ashcroft
1957	Adventures of Superman	Money to Burn	Adventure	Fire Marshal
1957	Highway Patrol	Two Episodes	Crime	Harvey Grant / Dr. Elliott
1957	The West Point Story	Two Episodes	Drama	
1957	Sergeant Preston of the Yukon	One Episode	Drama	Constable Drake
1958	Harbor Command	Rendezvous at Sea	Crime	Lt. Jay
1958	Tombstone Territory	Fight for a Fugitive	Western	Howie Dickerson
1958	Target	Taps for the General	Drama	
1958	Rescue 8	Subterranean City	Adventure	Deputy Sheriff #1
1958	Dragnet	The Big Border	Crime	
1959	The Rough Riders	An Eye for an Eye	Western	Major Steve Johnston
1959	Bat Masterson	Marked Deck	Western	William Roberts
1959	World of Giants	Teeth of the Watchdog	Sci Fy	
1959	Laramie	The Pass	Western	Lieutenant Ives
1960	Men into Space	Moon Trap	Sci Fy	Dr. Parker
1962	King of Diamonds	A Diamond for Mister Smith	Adventure	Wally Smith
1963	Perry Mason	The Case of the Potted Planter	Drama	Intern

== Source ==
- Goldrup, Jim and Tom (2012). The Encyclopedia of Feature Players of Hollywood. Vol. 1 (1st ed.). Duncan, Oklahoma: BearManor Media. p. 557. ISBN 978-1-62933-165-2.
- Reid, John Howard (2008). Silent Films & Early Talkies on DVD: A Classic Movie Fan's Guide. Lulu.com. p. 319. ISBN 978-1-4357-1073-3.
