= South of Death Valley =

1949 film by Ray Nazarro

- Theatrical release poster
- Directed by: Ray Nazarro
- Screenplay by: Earle Snell
- Story by: James Gruen
- Produced by: Colbert Clark
- Starring: Charles Starrett; Gail Davis; Fred F. Sears; Lee Roberts; Richard Emory; Clayton Moore; Smiley Burnette; Tommy Duncan
- Cinematography: Fayte M. Browne
- Edited by: Paul Borofsky
- Production company: Columbia Pictures
- Distributed by: Columbia Pictures
- Release date: August 8, 1949
- Running time: 54 minutes
- Country: United States
- Language: English

South of Death Valley is a 1949 American Western film directed by Ray Nazarro and written by Earle Snell. The film stars Charles Starrett, Gail Davis, Fred F. Sears, Lee Roberts, Richard Emory, Clayton Moore, Smiley Burnette and Tommy Duncan. The film was released on August 8, 1949, by Columbia Pictures. This was the thirty-ninth of 65 films in the Durango Kid series.

== Cast ==
- Charles Starrett as Steve Downey / The Durango Kid
- Gail Davis as Molly Tavish
- Fred F. Sears as Sam Ashton
- Lee Roberts as Scotty Tavish
- Richard Emory as Tommy Tavish
- Clayton Moore as Brad
- Smiley Burnette as Smiley Burnette
- Tommy Duncan as Tommy
