= Range Law (1944 film) =

1944 film by Lambert Hillyer

- Directed by: Lambert Hillyer
- Written by: Frank H. Young
- Produced by: Trem Carr
- Starring: Johnny Mack Brown; Raymond Hatton; Sarah Padden
- Cinematography: Harry Neumann
- Edited by: John C. Fuller
- Music by: Edward J. Kay
- Production company: Monogram Pictures
- Distributed by: Monogram Pictures
- Release date: June 24, 1944
- Running time: 57 minutes
- Country: United States
- Language: English

Range Law is a 1944 American Western film directed by Lambert Hillyer. This is the ninth film in the "Marshal Nevada Jack McKenzie" series, and stars Johnny Mack Brown as Jack McKenzie and Raymond Hatton as his sidekick Sandy Hopkins, with Sarah Padden, Ellen Hall and Lloyd Ingraham.

== Cast ==
- Johnny Mack Brown as U. S. Marshal Nevada McKenzie
- Raymond Hatton as U. S. Marshal Sandy Hopkins
- Sarah Padden as Boots Annie
- Ellen Hall as Lucille Gray
- Lloyd Ingraham as Judge Cal Bowen
- Marshall Reed as Jim Bowen
- Jack Ingram as Phil Randall
- Art Fowler as Henchman Swede Larson
- Hugh Prosser as Sheriff Jed Hawkins
- Stanley Price as Dawson
- Steve Clark as Pop McGee

== Bibliography ==
- Monaco, James. The Encyclopedia of Film. Perigee Books, 1991.
