= Call of the Rockies (1944 film) =

1944 film by Lesley Selander

- Film poster
- Directed by: Lesley Selander
- Screenplay by: Robert Creighton Williams
- Produced by: Louis Gray
- Starring: Smiley Burnette; Sunset Carson; Harry Woods; Kirk Alyn; Ellen Hall; Frank Jaquet
- Cinematography: John MacBurnie
- Edited by: Harry Keller
- Production company: Republic Pictures
- Distributed by: Republic Pictures
- Release date: July 14, 1944
- Running time: 56 minutes
- Country: United States
- Language: English

Call of the Rockies is a 1944 American Western film directed by Lesley Selander and written by Robert Creighton Williams. The film stars Smiley Burnette, Sunset Carson, Harry Woods, Kirk Alyn, Ellen Hall and Frank Jaquet. The film was released on July 14, 1944, by Republic Pictures.

== Cast ==
- Smiley Burnette as Frog Millhouse
- Sunset Carson as Sunset Carson
- Harry Woods as J. B. Murdock
- Kirk Alyn as Ned Crane
- Ellen Hall as Marjorie Malloy
- Frank Jaquet as Doc Lee
- Charles Williams as Burton Witherspoon
- Jack Kirk as Sheriff
- Tom London as Henchman Hansen
- Bob Kortman as Henchman Watson
- Edmund Cobb as Workman

== See also ==
- List of American films of 1944
