= Tracey Roberts (actress) =

American actress and acting coach

- Born: Blanche Elinore Goldstone; December 2, 1914; Little Falls, New York, U.S.
- Died: February 8, 2002 (aged 87); Los Angeles, California, U.S.
- Occupations: Acting teacher, actress, director
- Years active: 1950–1993
- Spouse: Jerry Adelman

Tracey Roberts (born Blanche Elinore Goldstone, December 2, 1914 – February 8, 2002) was an American actress who became an acting coach. Her name was sometimes seen as Tracy Roberts.

== Early years ==
Roberts was born in Little Falls, New York. She attended Cornell University and the University of Michigan before moving to New York City to study at the Actors Studio. She also worked as a model for illustrators. Two of her siblings went on to work in entertainment, Ann Marcus as a TV writer and producer and Raymond Goldstone as a writer for TV and films.

== Career ==
Roberts had the female lead in the film Fort Defiance (1951) and acted in Anything Goes, Actors in Sin (1952) and Hollywood or Bust (1956). On stage, she appeared in It's Been Wonderful, Paradise Lost, Winter Kill, Hedda Gabler, Orpheus Descending, The Seagull, and The Women.

After Roberts's acting opportunities began to diminish, she took a friend's advice and began to teach acting. She was artistic director and coach at the Tracy Roberts Actors Studio. Her production of Shadowinds won a Drama-Logue Award. Other works that she produced and/or directed included The Wonderful Ice Cream Suit and An Evening With Clifford Odets. She also directed The Art of Dining at the Tracy Roberts Theatre in West Hollywood, with her sister as executive producer.

On television, Roberts produced "A Woman's Place" (written by her sister) on Desilu Playhouse in 1960.

== Personal life and death ==
Roberts was married to Jerry Adelman. On February 8, 2002, she died of a cerebral hemorrhage at Cedars-Sinai Medical Center in Los Angeles at age 87.

== Partial filmography ==
- Sideshow (1950)
- Fort Defiance (1951)
- On Dangerous Ground (1952)
- Murder Is My Beat (1955)
- Edge of Hell (1956)
- The Wayward Girl (1957)
- In the Line of Duty: The F. B. I. Murders (1988)
- Somebody Has to Shoot the Picture (1990)
- Off and Running (1990)
- Matinee (1993)
