= Raiders of the Border =

1944 American Western film

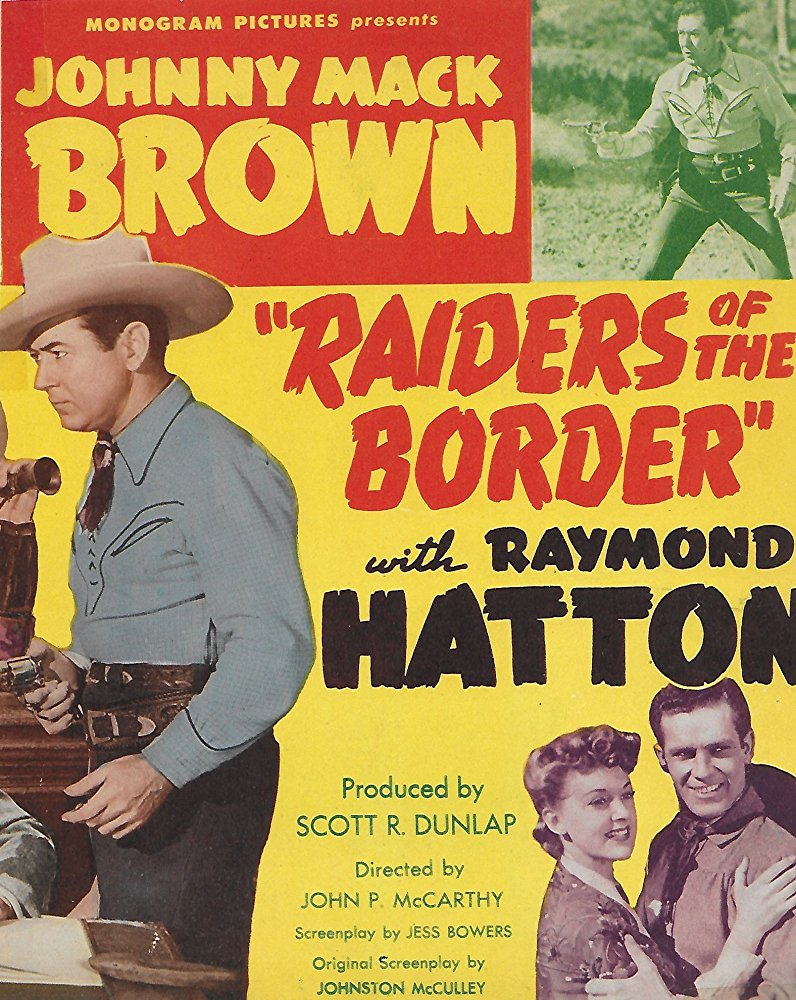
- Directed by: John P. McCarthy
- Screenplay by: Adele Buffington
- Story by: Johnston McCulley
- Produced by: Scott R. Dunlap
- Starring: Johnny Mack Brown; Raymond Hatton; Craig Woods; Ellen Hall; Ray Bennett; Edmund Cobb
- Cinematography: Harry Neumann
- Edited by: Carl Pierson
- Production company: Monogram Pictures
- Distributed by: Monogram Pictures
- Release date: January 31, 1944
- Running time: 53 minutes
- Country: United States
- Language: English

Raiders of the Border is a 1944 American Western film directed by John P. McCarthy and written by Adele Buffington. This is the sixth film in the "Marshal Nevada Jack McKenzie" series, and stars Johnny Mack Brown as Jack McKenzie and Raymond Hatton as his sidekick Sandy Hopkins, with Craig Woods, Ellen Hall, Ray Bennett and Edmund Cobb. The film was released on January 31, 1944, by Monogram Pictures.

== Plot ==
There is jewel smuggling happening at the border, and US Marshals Nevada Jack McKenzie (Johnny Mack Brown) and Sandy Hopkins (Raymond Hatton) go under cover to catch the bad guys.

== Cast ==
- Johnny Mack Brown as Nevada Jack McKenzie
- Raymond Hatton as Sandy Hopkins
- Craig Woods as Joe Roskins
- Ellen Hall as Bonita Bayne
- Ray Bennett as Tough Harsh
- Edmund Cobb as McGee
- Ernie Adams as Whiskey Wiley
- Richard Alexander as Steve Rollins
- Lynton Brent as Davis
- Stanley Price as Blackie
- Ben Corbett as Henchman
