= Lumberjack (film) =

1944 film by Lesley Selander

- Theatrical release poster
- Directed by: Lesley Selander
- Written by: Clarence E. Mulford (characters); Norman Houston (screenplay); Barry Shipman (screenplay)
- Produced by: Lewis J. Rachmil (associate producer); Harry Sherman (producer)
- Starring: See below
- Cinematography: Russell Harlan
- Music by: Paul Sawtell
- Release date: 28 April 1944
- Running time: 65 minutes
- Country: United States
- Language: English

Lumberjack is a 1944 American Western film directed by Lesley Selander.

== Plot ==
Buck Peters, the owner of the Bar-20 Ranch, tells Hoppy to stop his daughter, Julie, from eloping. Hoppy is too late to stop the wedding, but he arrives in time to see Julie's husband murdered.

The widowed bride hires Hoppy to find her husband's murderer, and save her new home from land grabbers. While protecting Julie's High Sierras' land Hoppy must climb down a rope onto a dangerous log dam.

== Cast ==
- William Boyd as Hopalong Cassidy
- Andy Clyde as 'California' Carlson
- Jimmy Rogers as Jimmy Rogers
- Douglass Dumbrille as Daniel J. Keefer
- Ellen Hall as Julie Peters Jordan
- Francis McDonald as Clyde Fenwick
- Ethel Wales as Aunt Abbey Peters
- Hal Taliaferro as Henchman Taggart
- Charles Morton as Big Joe Williams
- Herbert Rawlinson as Buck Peters
- Frances Morris as Mrs. Williams
- John Whitney as Ben Jordan
- Jack Rockwell as Sheriff Miles

== Soundtrack ==
- "The Place Your Heart Calls Home" (Written by Ozie Waters and Forrest Johnson)
