= Thunder Town =

1946 film

- Theatrical release poster
- Directed by: Harry L. Fraser
- Screenplay by: Oliver Drake
- Produced by: Arthur Alexander
- Starring: Bob Steele; Syd Saylor; Ellen Hall; Bud Geary; Charles King; Edward Howard
- Cinematography: Robert E. Cline
- Edited by: Roy Livingston
- Production company: Producers Releasing Corporation
- Distributed by: Producers Releasing Corporation
- Release date: April 12, 1946
- Running time: 57 minutes
- Country: United States
- Language: English

Thunder Town is a 1946 American Western film directed by Harry L. Fraser and written by Oliver Drake. The film stars Bob Steele, Syd Saylor, Ellen Hall, Bud Geary, Charles King and Edward Howard. The film was released on April 12, 1946, by Producers Releasing Corporation.

== Cast ==
- Bob Steele as Jim Brandon
- Syd Saylor as Utah McGirk
- Ellen Hall as Betty Morgan
- Bud Geary as Chuck Wilson
- Charles King as Bill Rankin
- Edward Howard as Dunc Rankin
- Steve Clark as Sheriff Matt Warner
- Bud Osborne as Henry Carson
- Jimmy Aubrey as Peter Collins
