= Cowboy from Lonesome River =

1944 film by Benjamin H. Kline

- Theatrical release poster
- Directed by: Benjamin H. Kline
- Screenplay by: Luci Ward
- Produced by: Jack Fier
- Starring: Charles Starrett; Vi Athens; Dub Taylor; Jimmy Wakely; Kenneth MacDonald; Ozie Waters
- Cinematography: Dave Ragin
- Edited by: Aaron Stell
- Production company: Columbia Pictures
- Distributed by: Columbia Pictures
- Release date: September 21, 1944
- Running time: 55 minutes
- Country: United States
- Language: English

Cowboy from Lonesome River is a 1944 American Western film directed by Benjamin H. Kline and written by Luci Ward. The film stars Charles Starrett, Vi Athens, Dub Taylor, Jimmy Wakely, Kenneth MacDonald and Ozie Waters. The film was released on September 21, 1944, by Columbia Pictures.

== Cast ==
- Charles Starrett as Steve Randall
- Vi Athens as Mona Grant
- Dub Taylor as Cannonball
- Jimmy Wakely as Jimmy Wakely
- Kenneth MacDonald as Senator Daniel G. Proctor / Sheppard Proctor
- Ozie Waters as Ozie Waters
- Art Wenzel as Slim
- Shelby Atchinson as Buck
- Foy Willing as Red
- Al Sloey as Al
- Craig Woods as Hawley
- Ian Keith as Matt Conway
- John Tyrrell as Pop Mason
- Bud Geary as Jones
- Steve Clark as Sheriff
- Jack Rockwell as Rancher Johnson
