= Gene Autry and the Mounties =

1951 film by John English

- Theatrical release poster
- Directed by: John English
- Written by: Norman S. Hall
- Produced by: Armand Schaefer
- Starring: Gene Autry; Elena Verdugo; Carleton Young; Richard Emory; Herbert Rawlinson; Trevor Bardette
- Cinematography: William Bradford
- Edited by: James Sweeney
- Production company: Gene Autry Productions
- Distributed by: Columbia Pictures
- Release date: January 30, 1951
- Running time: 70 minutes
- Country: United States
- Language: English

Gene Autry and the Mounties is a 1951 American Western film directed by John English, written by Norman S. Hall and starring Gene Autry, Elena Verdugo, Carleton Young, Richard Emory, Herbert Rawlinson and Trevor Bardette. The film was released on January 30, 1951 by Columbia Pictures.

== Cast ==
- Gene Autry as Gene Autry
- Elena Verdugo as Marie Duval
- Carleton Young as Pierre LaBlond
- Richard Emory as Terry Dillon
- Herbert Rawlinson as Inspector Wingate
- Trevor Bardette as Raoul Duval
- Francis McDonald as Batiste
- Jim Frasher as Jack Duval
- Pat Buttram as Scat Russell
- Champion as Champ
