= Craig Woods =

American actor (1913–1974)

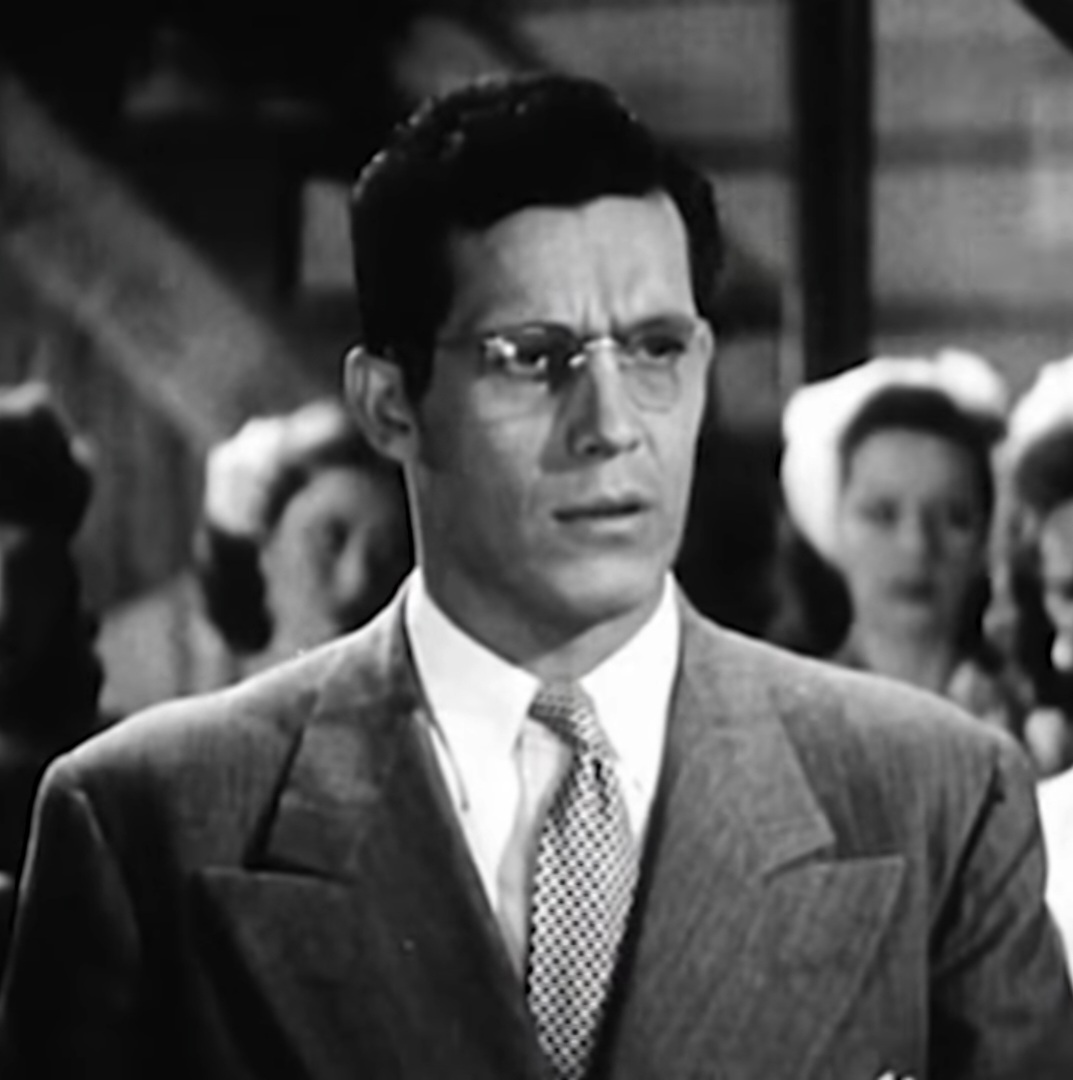
- Woods in Career Girl (1944)
- Born: Harry Lewis Woods Jr. April 14, 1918; Ohio, U.S.
- Died: September 12, 1974 (aged 56); Orange County, California, U.S.
- Occupation: Actor
- Years active: 1943–1950s
- Spouse(s): Gwen Seager (m. 1944; div. 19??); Barbara Patricia Shannon (m. 1951; ? 19??)
- Father: Harry Woods

Craig Woods (born Harry Lewis Woods Jr.; April 14, 1918 - September 12, 1974) was an actor who appeared in films during the Golden Age of Hollywood and later appeared on television. He was under contract with Columbia Pictures in the early 1940s. His father was screen actor Harry Woods, who was known for playing villains. His mother was Helen Hockenberry. In 1940, he enlisted in the US Army Air Corps.

== Filmography ==
Film
| Year | Title | Role | Notes |
|---|---|---|---|
| 1943 | Crime Doctor | Jim, a Convict | Uncredited |
| 1943 | What's Buzzin', Cousin? | Henchman | Uncredited |
| 1943 | Destroyer | Bigbee | Uncredited |
| 1943 | Dangerous Blondes | Bridegroom | Uncredited |
| 1943 | Doughboys in Ireland | U.S. Army Corporal | Uncredited |
| 1943 | My Kingdom for a Cook | Reporter | Uncredited |
| 1943 | There's Something About a Soldier | Jonesy | Uncredited |
| 1944 | Career Girl | James Blake | |
| 1944 | Raiders of the Border | Joe Roskins | |
| 1944 | Cowboy Canteen | Army Corporal | Uncredited |
| 1944 | Partners of the Trail | Joel Dixon | |
| 1944 | Cowboy from Lonesome River | Hawley | |
| 1945 | Gangs of the Waterfront | Paul Ogle | Uncredited |
| 1947 | Angel and the Badman | Ward Withers | |
| 1951 | Fort Defiance | Dave Parker | |
