= Ellen Hall =

American actress (1923–1999)

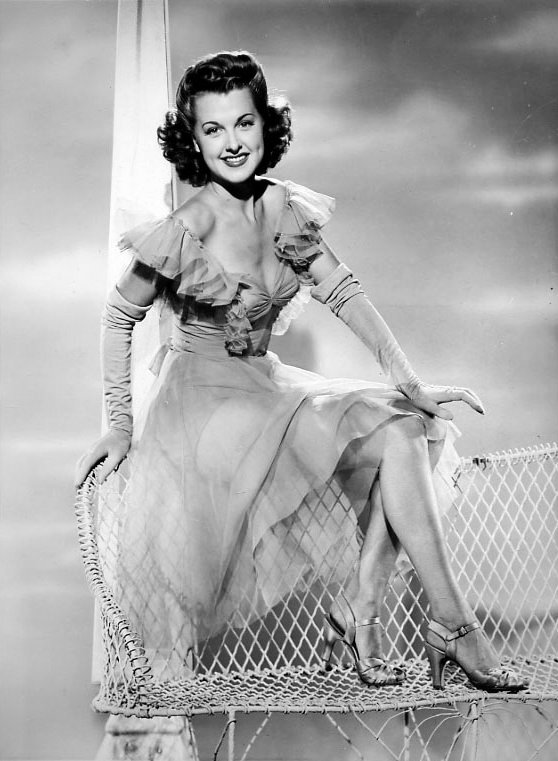
- Hall in 1943
- Born: Ellen Joanna Johnson; April 18, 1923; Los Angeles, California, U.S.
- Died: March 24, 1999 (aged 75); Bellevue, Nebraska, U.S.
- Other name: Ellen Langer
- Occupation: Actress
- Years active: 1941–1952
- Known for: Call of the Rockies 1944; Brand of the Devil 1944
- Spouse: Lee Langer (m. 1944; died 1995)
- Parents: Ella Hall; Emory Johnson
- Relatives: Richard Emory (brother)

Ellen Hall (April 18, 1923 – March 24, 1999) was an American actress and showgirl born in Los Angeles. She was introduced to the film industry when her mother, Ella Hall, got an uncredited cameo as a nurse in the 1930 Universal production All Quiet on the Western Front.

In 1943, Hall joined the Goldwyn Girls, a musical stock company of female dancers formed by Samuel Goldwyn, based on the Ziegfeld Girls. In 1944, 20th Century Fox invited her to join the newly formed Diamond Horseshoe Girls.

During her career, she acted in Westerns, a popular genre in the 1940s, as well as family comedies and musicals. In 1951, she appeared in the television series The Cisco Kid. She performed her last acting role in 1952, when she was 28.

Hall was introduced to Lee Langer, a Marine fighter pilot, in early 1944. The couple married on December 3, 1944, in North Hollywood, Los Angeles. Langer became a restaurateur and managed the upscale Encore restaurant on La Cienega Boulevard. Later in life, the couple retired in Rosarito Beach, Mexico.

Ellen Hall died on March 24, 1999, in Bellevue, Nebraska.

== Early years ==
Ellen Hall's mother was the actress Ella Hall, and her father was actor-turned-director Emory Johnson. The couple married in a private ceremony in 1917. After their honeymoon, the newlyweds moved into Johnson's Los Angeles residence, which they shared with his mother, Emilie Johnson. The oldest of Hall's siblings, Emory Waldemar Johnson Jr, was born on January 27, 1919. The Johnson's second child, Alfred Bernard Johnson, was born on September 26, 1920. Ellen Hall was born Ellen Joanna Johnson on April 19, 1923.

In 1924, Ellen's mother filed for divorce, though the couple reconciled in late 1925. In March 1926, a truck fatally struck the five-year-old Alfred while the kids were crossing a busy street in Hollywood. The Johnson couple subsequently had another child, Diana Marie, on October 27, 1929.

Hall's parents eventually divorced in 1930, and Ella and her three children found residence with Ella's mother, who lived in North Hollywood. Ella got work at the upscale department store I. Magnin. In 1932, Emory Johnson declared bankruptcy to reduce his financial obligations towards Ella and their children.

== Career ==
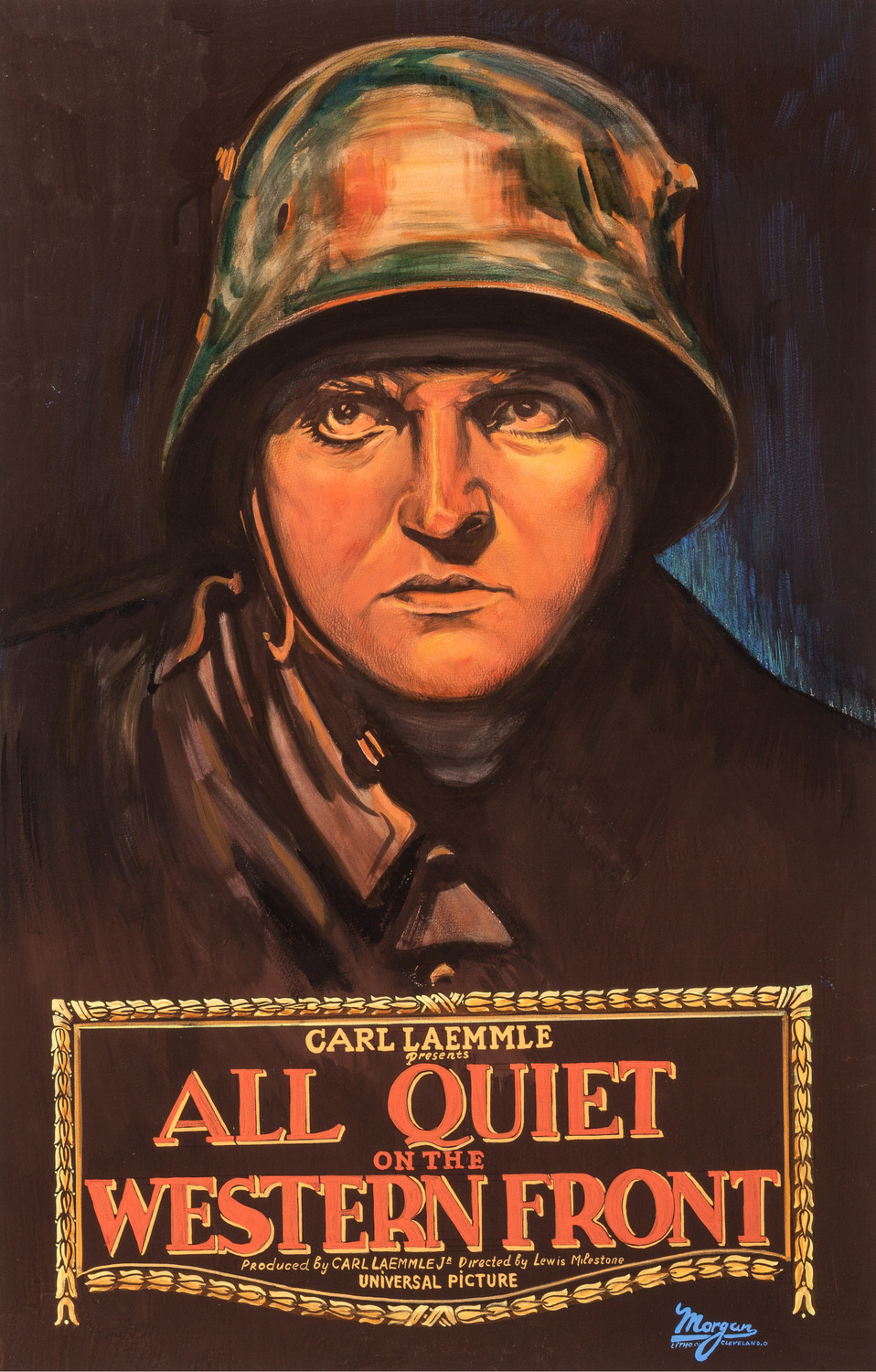
Poster for All Quiet on the Western Front

Hall appeared in her first large-scale production when she was seven. Her mother secured roles for her and her ten-year-old brother, Waldmar, in the 1930 Universal production All Quiet on the Western Front.

According to another newspaper account, Hall made her first appearance in front of the cameras at age nine, with an uncredited role in Mary Pickford's Secrets, released in 1933.

=== Comedies, glamour, and musicals ===
At the age of 18, Hall was chosen to play one of the background autograph seekers in the 1941 musical comedy The Chocolate Soldier.

At 21, in 1943, Hall became one of the thirty-four Goldwyn Girls, created by Sam Goldwyn. This led her to appear in the 1944 Samuel Goldwyn Productions musical Up in Arms. Her promotional photo from the shoot states, She is 5'6" tall, weighs 123 pounds, and has brown hair and blue eyes. In 1944, she appeared in Here Come the Waves; in 1945, Wonder Man; and in 1946, Cinderella Jones. This role would be her last in a musical. In late 1944, Hall was selected by 20th-Century Fox producer William Perlberg to join the fourteen Diamond Horseshoe Girls.

=== Westerns ===
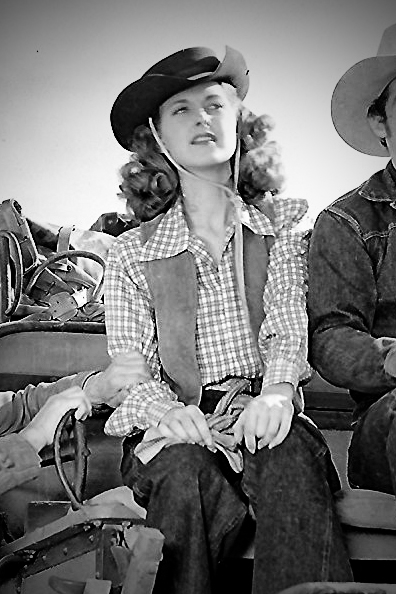
Hall in a promotional photo for Thunder Town

Although she had work in other genres, Hall found her acting niche in B movie Westerns. Out of her filmography of twenty movies, eight were Westerns. In 1943, the 20-year-old actress got her first female lead in the Monogram Pictures production Outlaws of Stampede Pass. Hall would act in five Westerns in 1944: in January, she got top female billing in Raiders of the Border; in April, she appeared in Lumberjack; in June, Range Law; and in July, Call of the Rockies and Brand of the Devil.

Following her 1944 marriage, Hall began accepting fewer film roles. In 1946, she acted in Thunder Town, and in 1949, she accepted her final role in a Hollywood Western, in Lawless Code.

=== Other genres and mediums ===
Interspersed with her 1944 Western roles, Hall also landed a role as the long-dead wife of Bela Lugosi in the 1944 film Voodoo Man. After getting married, she acted in six more movies, and in 1951, she appeared in three episodes of the Western television series The Cisco Kid. Her final Hollywood production was the 1951 film Bowery Battalion, and her last recorded film is the 1952 PFC production The Congregation. She retired from making films at the age of 28.

== Personal life ==
=== Marriage ===
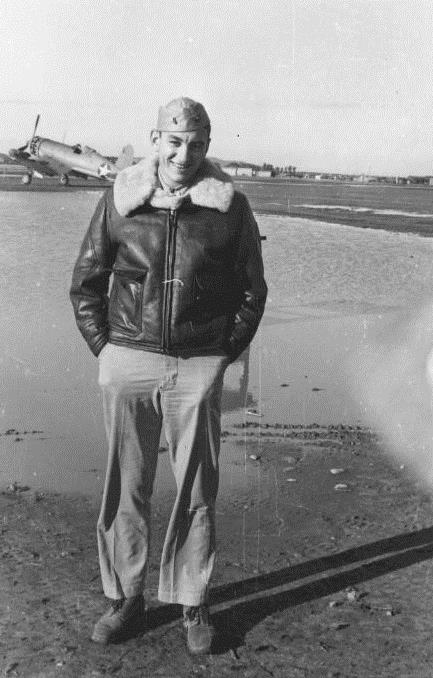
Hall's husband, Lee Langer, in 1943

In February 1944, Hall was working with actress Ann Sheridan on a scene for the Warner Bros. production Shine On, Harvest Moon. While on set, Sheridan introduced Hall to Lee Langer, a Marine fighter pilot who had seen action in the Guadalcanal campaign. (Note: Nathan Hale "Toots" Langer was born on February 3, 1919, in Chicago, Illinois. His Jewish parents immigrated to the United States from Austria in 1910. After earning his diploma from Chicago's Bowen High School, he became a student at Bradley Polytechnic Institute, in Peoria, Illinois. On September 26, 1941, Langer was 22 years old and a second-year student at Bradley when he volunteered for the United States Marine Corps; he secured his commission as a second lieutenant in June 1942. Lieutenant Langer received his assignment to the marine squadron VMA-124. It became operational on December 28, 1942, and subsequently deployed to Guadalcanal on February 12, 1943. VMA-124 remained in the Solomon Islands until September 1943.) Hall and Langer immediately connected, and two weeks later, on March 13, 1944, they announced their engagement. Hall was 20 years old, while Langer was 25.

The couple married on December 3, 1944, in North Hollywood. Rickie VanDusen was Hall's maid of honor. Hall's mother, Ella, was friends with Mary Pickford, who arranged for the wedding reception to be held at the Hollywood home of her friend Frances Marion. Along with Hall's mother, Pickford was in the receiving line. A newspaper article describing the wedding referenced Hall's father as "the late Emory Johnson"; father and daughter were estranged at the time.

After the wedding, Langer remained on active duty. The couple moved into a three-bedroom Spanish stucco-style home in Los Angeles. The military discharged Langer from active service on February 21, 1946. A son was born to the couple on March 4, 1949.

Langer became a restaurateur and managed the upscale Encore restaurant on La Cienega Boulevard. In 1951, he also became a major in the Marine Reserves.

=== Retirement ===
By 1952, Hall had retired from acting. She was a Motion Picture & Television Fund volunteer group member and served as its volunteer president from 1969 to 1970.

Although the timeframe is unknown, Lee and Ellen Langer chose to retire in Rosarito Beach, Mexico. They would remain married until Langer's death, in 1995.

=== Death ===
In 1995, Lee Langer died of natural causes in San Ysidro, San Diego, aged 76. The couple had been together for 50 years. Following Langer's death, Hall went to live with their son in Bellevue, Nebraska. On March 24, 1999, she died of complications from a stroke while residing in Bellevue's Hillcrest Care and Rehabilitation Center, aged 75.

Her ashes were transported west to Forest Lawn Memorial Park in Glendale, California, where she was interred alongside her mother, Ella Hall, and younger sister, Diana Marie Moxley.

== Filmography ==
◆ Filmography of Ellen Hall ◆
| Year | Film | Role | Production | Distribution | Genre | Credit | Released |
|---|---|---|---|---|---|---|---|
| 1930 | All Quiet on the Western Front | Young girl | Universal | Universal | War | No | Apr 21, 1930 |
| 1933 | Secrets | Young girl | Mary Pickford | United Artists | Drama | No | Mar 16, 1933 |
| 1941 | The Chocolate Soldier | Autograph seeker | MGM | Loews Inc. | Musical | No | Oct 31, 1941 |
| 1943 | Outlaws of Stampede Pass | Mary Lewis | Monogram | Monogram | Western | Yes | Oct 15, 1943 |
| 1944 | Raiders of the Border | Bonita Bayne | Monogram | Monogram | Western | Yes | Jan 31, 1944 |
| 1944 | Up in Arms | Goldwyn Girl | Samuel Goldwyn | RKO | Musical | No | Feb 17, 1944 |
| 1944 | Voodoo Man | Evelyn Marlowe | Banner Prod | Monogram | Horror | Yes | Feb 21, 1944 |
| 1944 | Lumberjack | Julie Peters Jordan | Harry Sherman | United Artists | Western | Yes | Apr 28, 1944 |
| 1944 | Range Law | Lucille Gray | Monogram | Monogram | Western | Yes | Jun 24, 1944 |
| 1944 | Call of the Rockies | Marjorie Malloy | Republic | Republic | Western | Yes | Jul 14, 1944 |
| 1944 | Brand of the Devil | Molly Dawson | Arthur Alexander | PRC | Western | Yes | Jul 30, 1944 |
| 1944 | Here Come the Waves | Johnny Cabot Fan | Mark Sandrich | Paramount | Musical | No | Dec 18, 1944 |
| 1945 | A Royal Scandal | Unknown | Ernst Lubitsch | 20th Century Fox | Drama | No | Apr 11, 1945 |
| 1945 | Having Wonderful Crime | Bathing beauty | Robert Fellows | RKO | Comedy | No | Apr 12, 1945 |
| 1945 | Wonder Man | Goldwyn Girl | Samuel Goldwyn | RKO | Musical | No | Jun 8, 1945 |
| 1946 | Cinderella Jones | Junior Leaguer | Warner Bros. | Warner Bros. | Musical | No | Mar 9, 1946 |
| 1946 | Thunder Town | Betty Morgan | PRC | PRC | Western | Yes | Apr 12, 1946 |
| 1949 | Lawless Code | Rita Caldwell | Monogram | Monogram | Western | Yes | Dec 4, 1949 |
| 1951 | Bowery Battalion | – | Jan Grippo | Monogram | Comedy | No | Jan 24, 1951 |
| 1952 | The Congregation | – | Paul F. Heard Prod | PFC | Religious | No | Jan 1, 1952 |

== Television ==
◆ Television Roles for Ellen Hall ◆
| Year | Series | Role | Season | Episode | Name | Genre | Air Date |
|---|---|---|---|---|---|---|---|
| 1950 | The Cisco Kid | Elaine Jarrett | 1 | 16 | "Newspaper Crusader" | Western | Dec 19, 1950 |
| 1951 | The Cisco Kid | Elaine | 1 | 22 | "Freight Line Feud" | Western | Jan 27, 1951 |
| 1951 | The Cisco Kid | Elaine Wilson | 2 | 1 | "Performance Bond" | Western | Sep 3, 1951 |

== Gallery ==
Ellen's Family

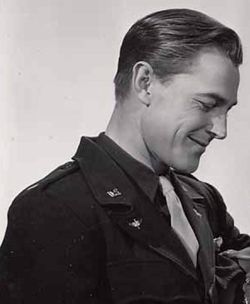
Emory Waldemar Johnson
Richard Emory
1952

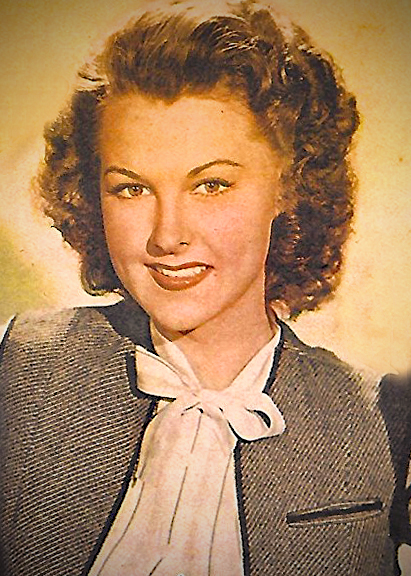
Ellen Joanna Johnson
Ellen Hall
1944
Cast member with on-screen credit

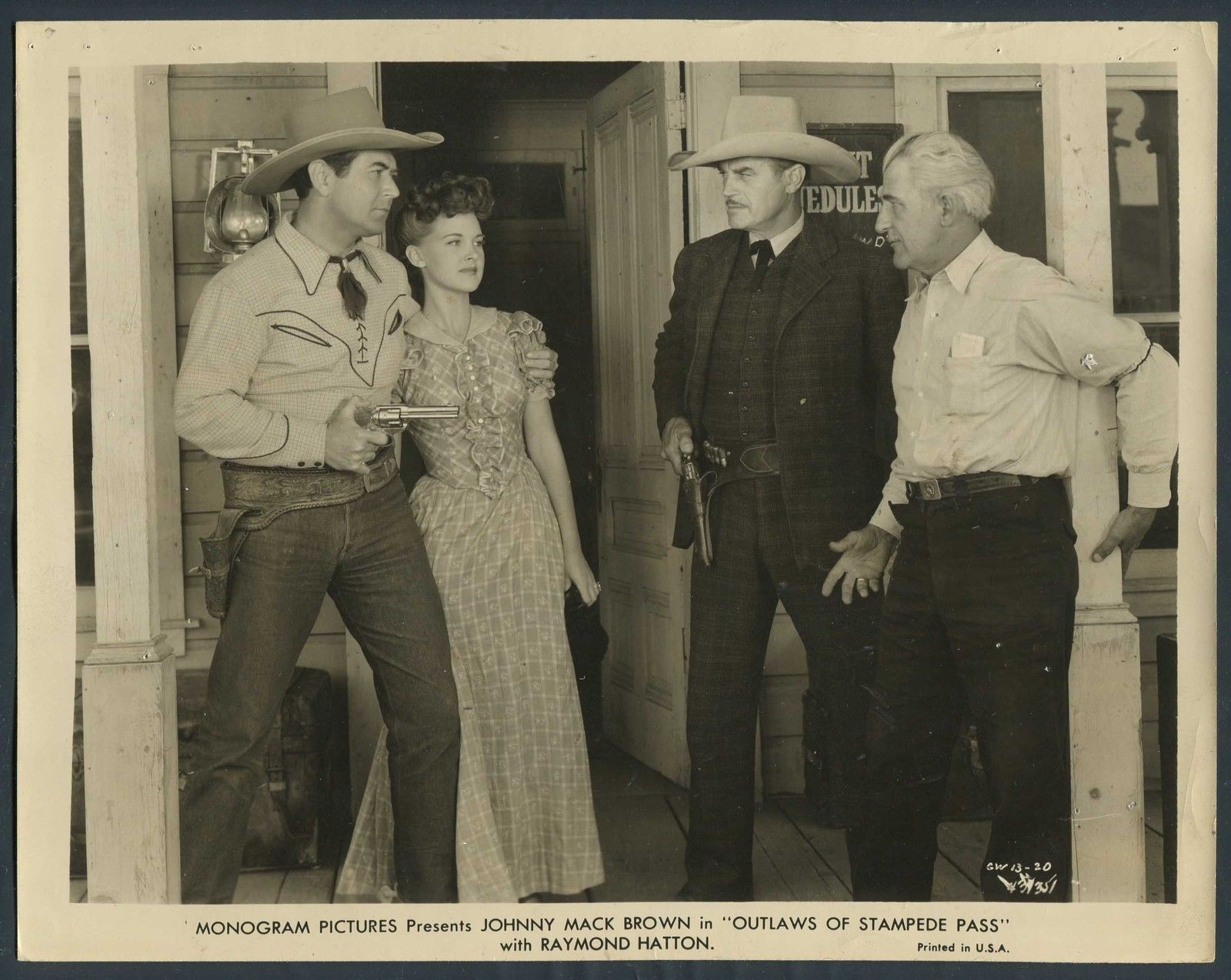
Outlaws of Stampede Pass
1943

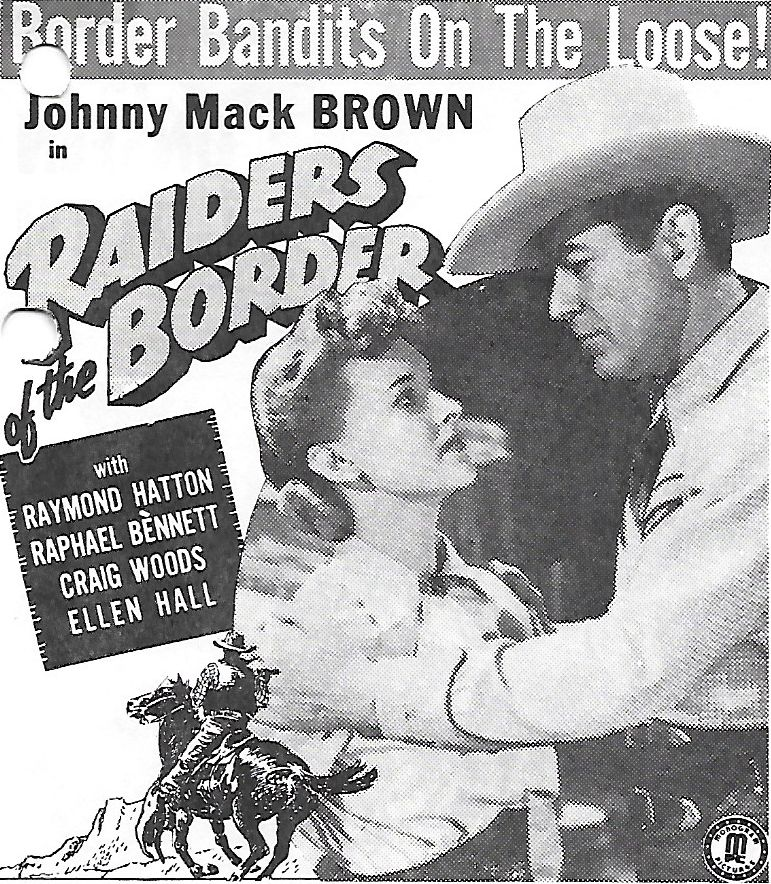
Raiders of the Border
1944

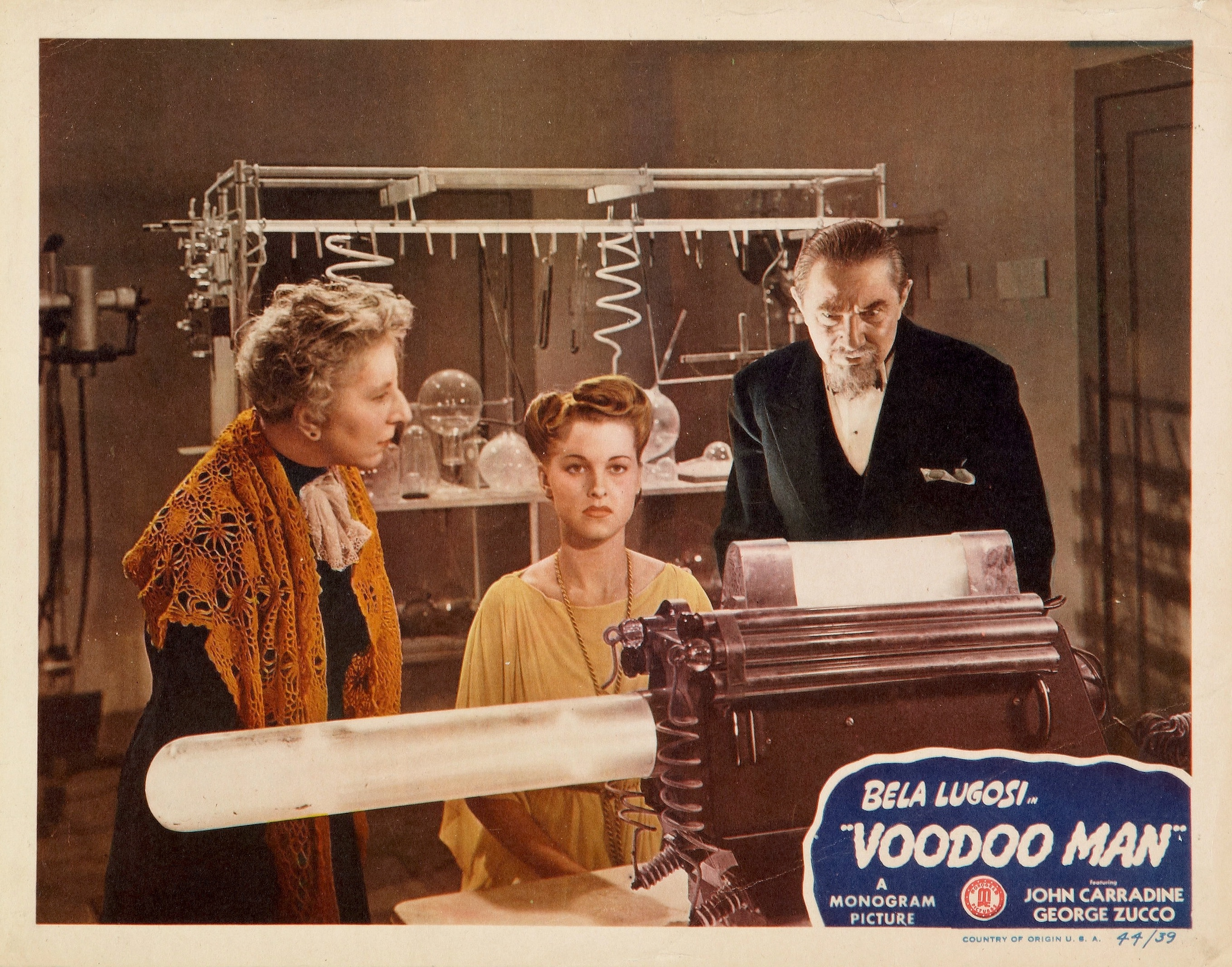
Voodoo Man
1944

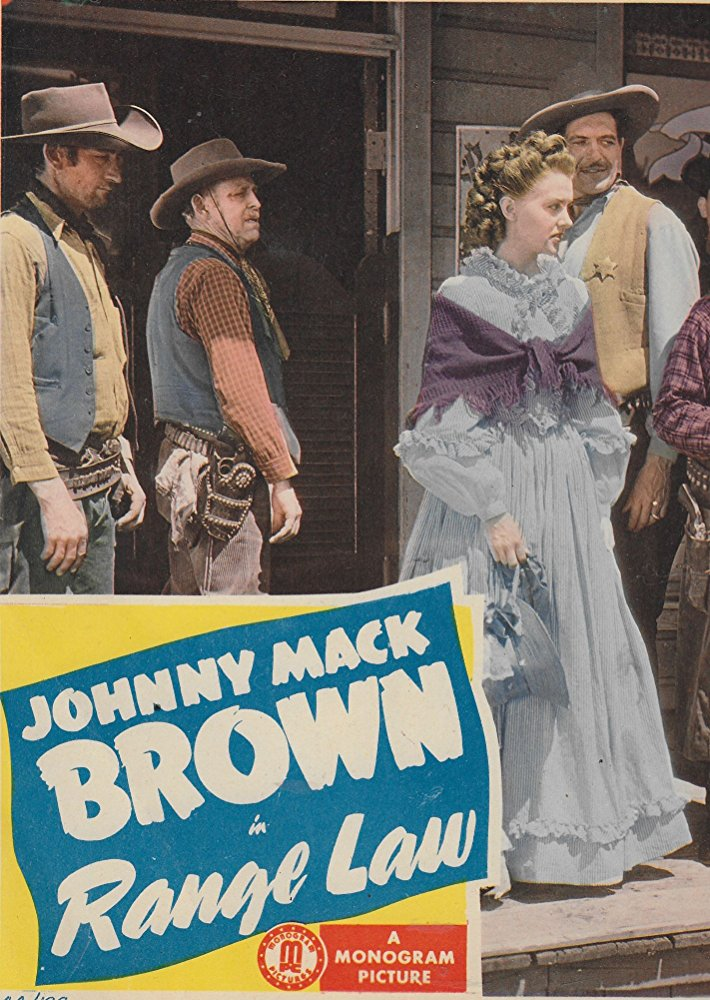
Range Law
1944

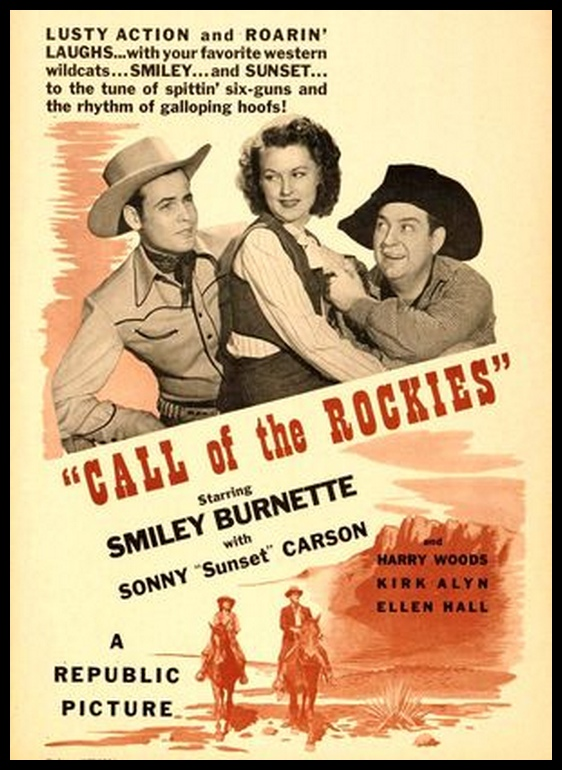
Call of the Rockies
1944

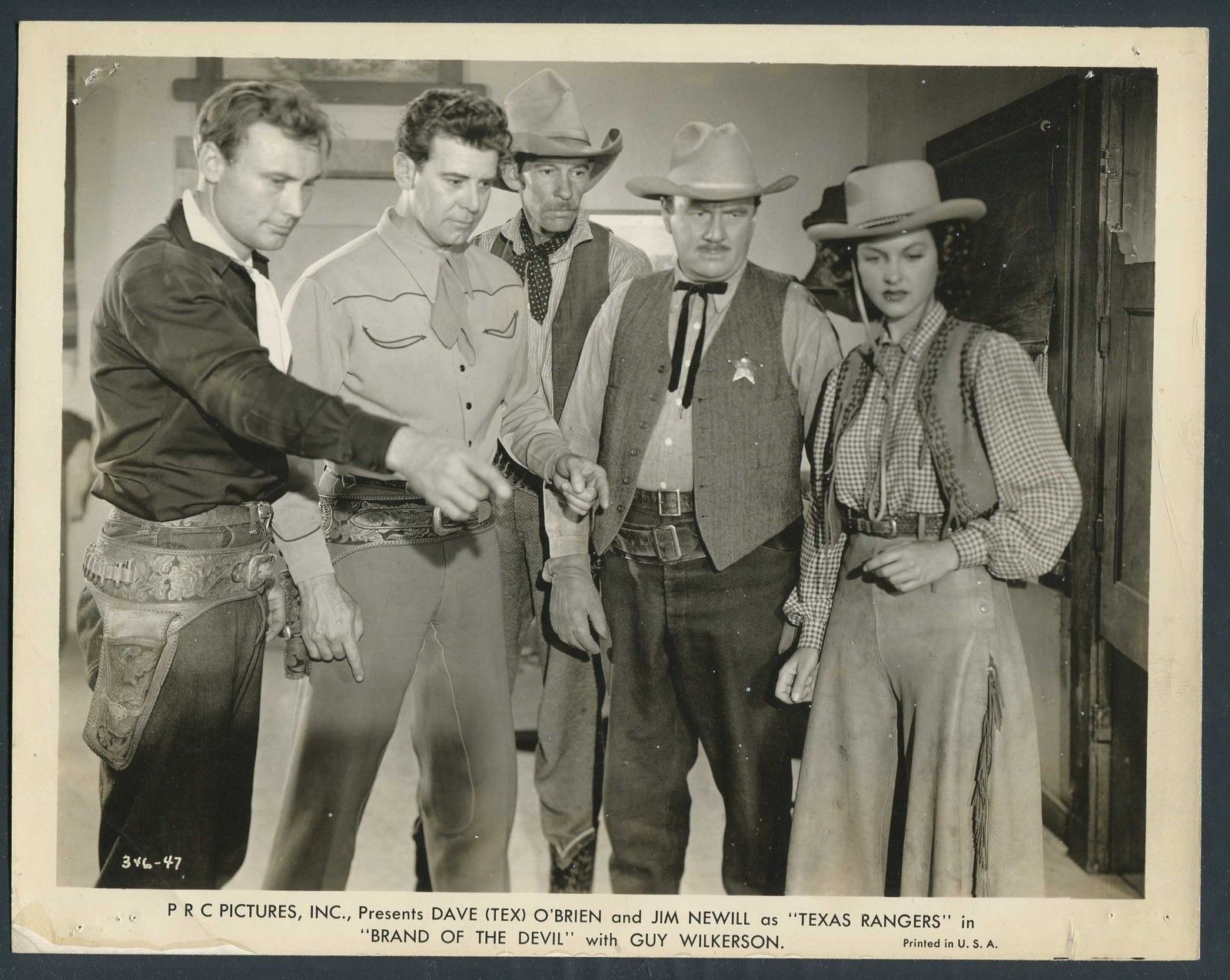
Brand of the Devil
1944

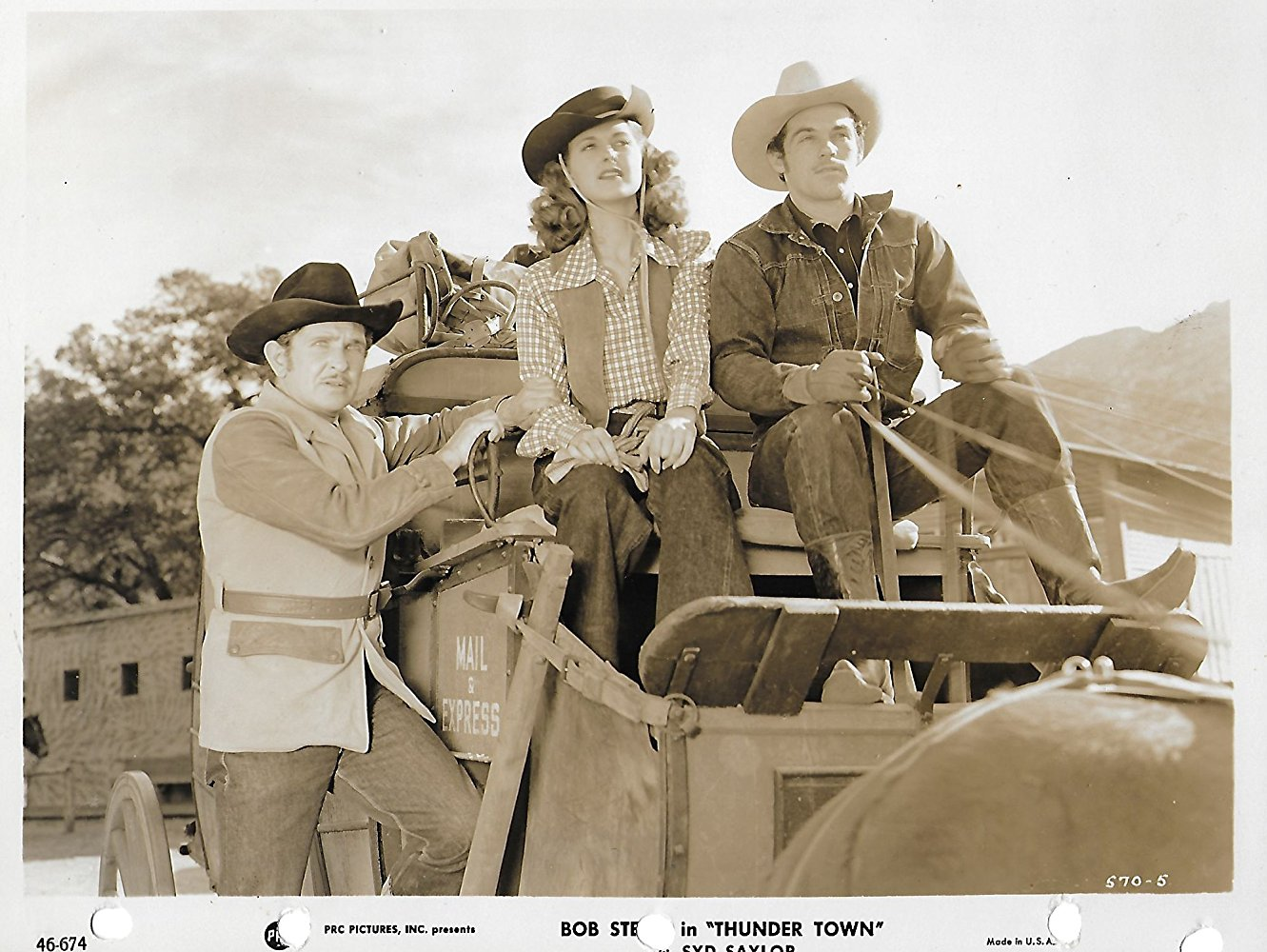
Thunder Town
1946

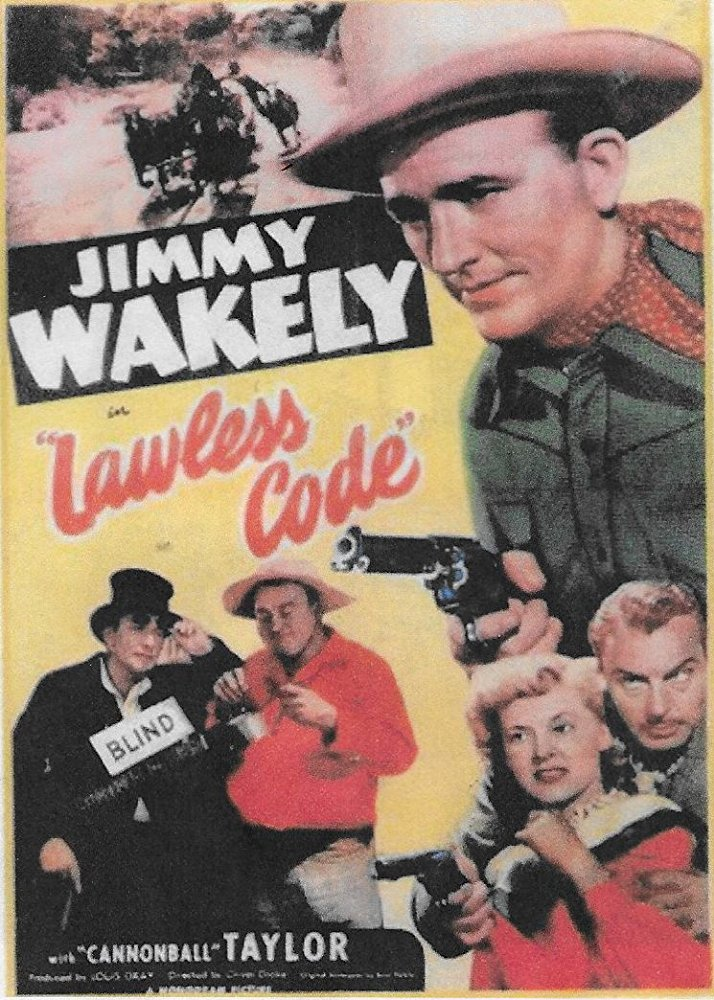
Lawless Code
1949

== Bibliography ==
- Goldrup, Tom; Goldrup, Jim (2012). The Encyclopedia of Feature Players of Hollywood, Volume 1. BearManor Media. p. 592.
