= Fort Defiance (film) =

1951 film by John Rawlins

- Theatrical release poster
- Directed by: John Rawlins
- Screenplay by: Louis Lantz
- Produced by: Frank Melford
- Starring: Dane Clark; Ben Johnson; Peter Graves; Tracey Roberts; George Cleveland; Ralph Sanford
- Cinematography: Stanley Cortez
- Music by: Paul Sawtell
- Production company: Ventura Pictures Corporation
- Distributed by: United Artists
- Release date: October 9, 1951
- Running time: 82 minutes
- Country: United States
- Language: English

Fort Defiance is a 1951 American Western film directed by John Rawlins, written by Louis Lantz and starring Dane Clark, Ben Johnson, Peter Graves and Tracey Roberts. The film was released on October 9, 1951 by United Artists.

== Plot ==
Ben Shelby visits a cattle ranch outside Fort Defiance, Arizona in search of Johnny Tallon. He meets Johnny's blind brother Ned, who believes that Ned should be home soon. Ben meets Ned's uncle Charlie and helps repel two men trying to cheat Charlie and Ned on a cattle deal. Ben offers to stay and help Ned and Charlie mind the ranch while awaiting Johnny.

Charlie learns that Johnny has been killed while robbing a bank and admits to Ned that he knew that Johnny had become a criminal after the Civil War. Ned now understands that Ben came to kill Johnny. Ben reveals that he is the only survivor from his company, which was annihilated at the Battle of Tennessee Ridge three weeks before the war ended because of Johnny's treasonous act. Ben's brother was killed in the same battle.

At a saloon, Ben writes a letter to his wife Jane, asking her to catch the next stage to Fort Defiance. Dave Parker, owner of the saloon and a large ranch, appears with a group of men. Ben's half-written letter mentioning Johnny and the Tennessee Ridge disaster has been brought to the attention of Parker, who had lost two brothers in the battle and wants to even the score by killing Ned. A gunfight ensues and Ben and Ned ride away. Charlie is killed while trying to resist Parker's men. Ned and Ben ride into the dangerous Navajo Canyon.

Johnny, accompanied by his pal Hankey, appears. He extracts information from Parker's men concerning Ned's location and how their uncle was killed. Johnny kills two of the men and tells the third one to inform Parker that Johnny is alive. Johnny and Hankey trail Ned and Ben. Ned tells Ben how Johnny had received a huge scar on his hand from fighting Parker's sons, beating him so badly that he had lost his sight. Ned is unaware that his brother is there but, as the Indians near, he recognizes Johnny by feeling his scar. He demands to know whether the story about Tennessee Ridge is true. The Indians are dispatched in a fight that kills Hankey. Johnny has money from a robbery to bring Ned to San Francisco for eye surgery, but Ned refuses.

The men spot a stagecoach that is being chased and they intervene to repel the Indians. Ben discovers that Jane may have been one of the passengers who had avoided passage because of the Indian issue. On board the coach is dancehall girl Julie, with whom Ned begins to fall in love. The next morning, the Indians attack again. The men defend themselves until the cavalry arrives. Johnny forces Ned onto the stagecoach, knocks Ben unconscious and leaves the driver with him, and Julie rides along. Inside the stagecoach office, Ned draws a gun on Johnny and begs him to not force him to go. At the saloon, he tells Parker's man that Parker has bought the Tallon ranch. Johnny demands a bill of sale and the saloon's cash. Parker's man argues and Johnny shoots him. The bartender supplies Johnny with the money and bill of sale, which Johnny gives to Ben, who has recovered and ridden to Fort Defiance, so that he and Ned can start their ranch partnership.

Parker arrives and demands to see Johnny and Ned. Johnny emerges with his guns blazing and shoots all of Parker's men before Parker shoots him dead, and Ben kills Parker. A stagecoach arrives and Jane is aboard. The four can now begin their new life.

== Cast ==
- Dane Clark as Johnny Tallon
- Ben Johnson as Ben Shelby
- Peter Graves as Ned Tallon
- Tracey Roberts as Julie Morse
- George Cleveland as Uncle Charlie Tallon
- Ralph Sanford as Jed Brown, Stagecoach Driver
- Iron Eyes Cody as Brave Bear
- Dennis Moore as Lt. Lucas
- Craig Woods as Dave Parker
- Dick Elliott as Kincaid
- Bryan 'Slim' Hightower as Hankey
- Phil Rawlins as Les
- Jerry Ambler as Cheyenne
- Kit Guard as Tracy
- Wes Hudman as Stranger
- Hugh Hooker as Ed

== Reception ==
In a contemporary review for the New York Daily News, critic Dorothy Masters wrote: "'Fort Defiance' has something relatively rare in westerns—a quality called imagination. It has, in addition, impressive scenes in Cinecolor and cast capable of more than sitting on a horse and toting a gun. This time the mechanics of the typical sagebrusher are secondary to the human interest—the maze of relationship between a blind lad, the no-'count brother he worships and a Civil War veteran who has sworn to kill the man responsible for his own brother's death during the war."
