= Lawless Code =

1949 film by Oliver Drake

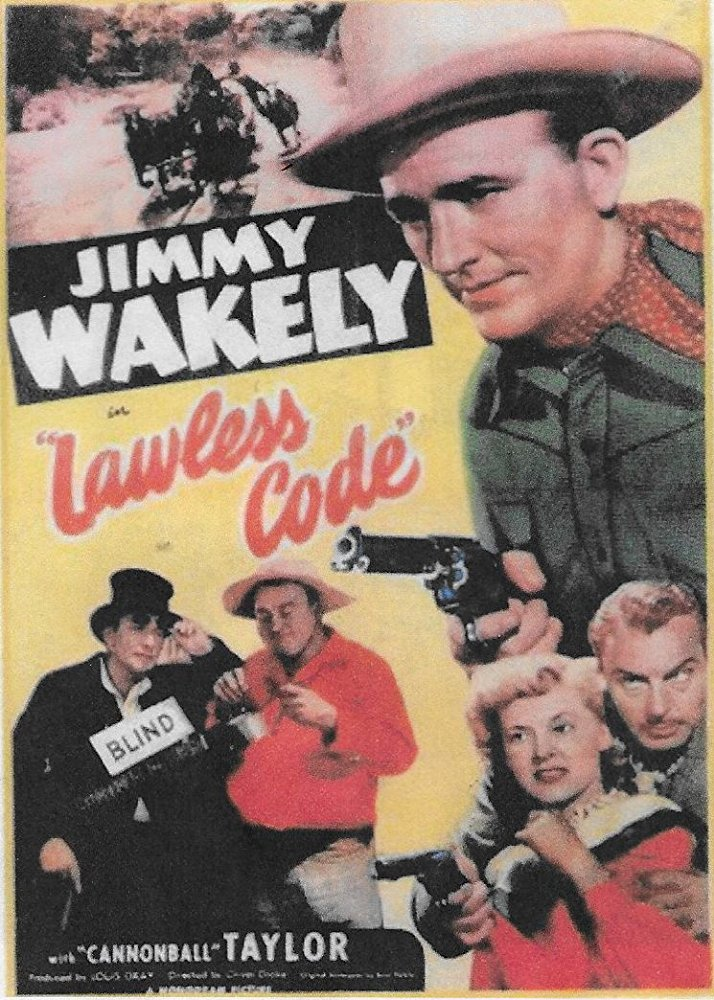
- Theatrical release poster
- Directed by: Oliver Drake
- Screenplay by: Basil Dickey
- Produced by: Louis Gray
- Starring: Jimmy Wakely; Dub Taylor; Ellen Hall; Tris Coffin; Riley Hill; Kenne Duncan
- Cinematography: Harry Neumann
- Edited by: Carl Pierson
- Production company: Monogram Pictures
- Distributed by: Monogram Pictures
- Release date: December 4, 1949
- Running time: 58 minutes
- Country: United States
- Language: English

Lawless Code is a 1949 American Western film directed by Oliver Drake and written by Basil Dickey. The film stars Jimmy Wakely, Dub Taylor, Ellen Hall, Tris Coffin, Riley Hill and Kenne Duncan. The film was released on December 4, 1949, by Monogram Pictures.

== Cast ==
- Jimmy Wakely as Jimmy Wakely
- Dub Taylor as 'Cannonball' Taylor
- Ellen Hall as Rita Caldwell
- Tris Coffin as Judge Harmon Steele
- Riley Hill as Curley Blake
- Kenne Duncan as Tom Blaine
- Myron Healey as Donald Martin
- Terry Frost as Carter
- Beatrice Maude as Mrs. Caldwell
- Steve Clark as Jed Gordon
- Bud Osborne as Sheriff
- Bob Curtis as Deputy
- Carl Moore as The 'Blind' Man
