= Outlaws of Stampede Pass =

1943 American Western film

- Theatrical release poster
- Directed by: Wallace Fox
- Screenplay by: Adele Buffington
- Story by: Johnston McCulley
- Produced by: Scott R. Dunlap
- Starring: Johnny Mack Brown; Raymond Hatton; Ellen Hall; John Dawson; Harry Woods; Charles King
- Cinematography: Marcel Le Picard
- Edited by: Carl Pierson
- Production company: Monogram Pictures
- Distributed by: Monogram Pictures
- Release date: October 15, 1943
- Running time: 58 minutes
- Country: United States
- Language: English

Outlaws of Stampede Pass is a 1943 American Western film directed by Wallace Fox and written by Adele Buffington. This is the fourth film in the "Marshal Nevada Jack McKenzie" series, and stars Johnny Mack Brown as Jack McKenzie and Raymond Hatton as his sidekick Sandy Hopkins, with Ellen Hall, John Dawson, Harry Woods and Charles King. The film was released on October 15, 1943, by Monogram Pictures.

== Plot ==
Tom Evans (Jon Dawson) has trail-driven his heard to Yucca City, where he intends to sell the heard to Ben Crowley (Harry Woods). Crowley is the town big shot who owns most everything of value in the town. The night before driving the cattle into town to make the final sale, Evans gets caught up in a crooked card game hosted by Crowley. During the game a U.S. Marshal, "Nevada Jack" McKensey (Johnny Mack Brown) who is working undercover, manages to obtain one of the fixed deck of cards. While Evans is engaged in the game Crowley takes his gang, rustles the cattle, and kills Evans' cowhands. When Evans learns his men have been shot, and his cattle stolen, he rushes out of the saloon, only to be shot in the back by one of Crowley's thugs. McKensey rescues Evans and shutters him with the local blacksmith Jeff Lewis (Sam Flint) and his daughters Mary. They send for U.S. Marshall Sandy Hopkins, Evans' uncle, and hatch a plan to make things right. Deception and gunfire ensue, and the good guys go for the win.

== Cast ==
- Johnny Mack Brown as Nevada Jack McKenzie
- Raymond Hatton as Sandy Hopkins
- Ellen Hall as Mary Lewis
- John Dawson as Tom Evans
- Harry Woods as Ben Crowley
- Charles King as Steve Carse
- Edmund Cobb as Hank
- Sam Flint as Jeff Lewis
- Mauritz Hugo as Slick
- Art Mix as Gus
- Herman Hack as Ed
- Artie Ortego as Joe
- Milburn Morante as Zeke
- Edward Burns as Red
- Dan White as Kurt
