= Pick a Peck of Plumbers =

- Directed by: Jules White
- Written by: Felix Adler
- Screenplay by: Felix Adler
- Produced by: Jules White
- Starring: El Brendel; Shemp Howard; John Tyrrell; Brian O'Hara; Al Thompson; Kathryn Keys; Heinie Conklin; Judy Malcolm; Joe Palma
- Cinematography: Glen Gano
- Edited by: Charles Hochberg
- Distributed by: Columbia Pictures
- Release date: July 23, 1944 (U.S.)
- Running time: 17:33
- Country: United States
- Language: English

Pick a Peck of Plumbers is an American comedy short produced and directed by Jules White. Released by Columbia Pictures on July 23, 1944, it stars El Brendel and Shemp Howard, both of whom receive top-billing in the short.

== Plot ==
Elmer (El Brendel) and Axel (Shemp Howard) are two vagrants who are on trial for wrecking a policeman's motorcycle. The judge (John Tyrell) fines them $100 or they go to jail for 100 days. The two men convince the judge to let them get a job to pay the fine, which he accepts. They end up getting a job as assistant plumbers, even though they know nothing about plumbing. The boys also find themselves in hot water when they unknowingly assault a customer in the shop, who turns out to be the judge. Their first assignment is to locate a ring that fell down in a sink at a mansion where a bridge club game is going on. They destroy the bathroom and the rest of the house until they finally retrieve the ring at the end.

== Production notes ==
Pick a Peck of Plumbers is a remake of 1934's Plumbing For Gold starring George Sidney and Charlie Murray. It was partially reworked with The Three Stooges as A Plumbing We Will Go (1940) and Vagabond Loafers (1949). It was remade by the Stooges again in 1956 as Scheming Schemers.

In 1944, the shorts department at Columbia paired Brendel with different comedians since they did not know what to do with him. Brendel and Howard did not really click together as a team. Brendel was paired with silent-screen comedian Harry Langdon, who had his own series of comedy shorts at Columbia since 1934, for some of the latter shorts until Langdon's death in 1945. After his death, Columbia decided not to renew Brendel's contract.
