= For Crimin' Out Loud =

1956 American short film by Jules White

- Directed by: Jules White; Edward Bernds (stock footage)
- Screenplay by: Felix Adler
- Story by: Edward Bernds
- Produced by: Jules White
- Starring: Moe Howard; Larry Fine; Shemp Howard; Barbara Bartay; Emil Sitka; Duke York; Ralph Dunn; Christine McIntyre; Charles Knight
- Cinematography: Irving Lippman
- Edited by: Harold White
- Distributed by: Columbia Pictures
- Release date: May 3, 1956 (U.S.)
- Running time: 16:02
- Country: United States
- Language: English

For Crimin' Out Loud is a 1956 short subject directed by Jules White starring American slapstick comedy team The Three Stooges (Moe Howard, Larry Fine and Shemp Howard). It is the 170th entry in the series released by Columbia Pictures starring the comedians, who released 190 shorts for the studio between 1934 and 1959.

== Plot ==
The Stooges work for Miracle Detective Agency, and are hired by a middle-aged millionaire named John Goodrich (Emil Sitka) to track down some racketeers who have threatened his life. Mr. Goodrich apprises them of the malevolent activities perpetrated by the Phantom Gang, an malevolent organization implicated in the murder of prominent socialites and affluent individuals, with Mr. Goodrich himself slated as their next victim.

Upon their arrival, the Stooges find Mr. Goodrich incapacitated and confined, with his complicit butler, who is revealed to be a member of the Phantom Gang, receiving them. Furthermore, Mr. Goodrich's niece, a member of the gang, endeavors to ensnare Shemp, culminating in an attempt to administer poison. Subsequently, the Stooges find themselves pursued by Nikko, a formidable henchman of imposing stature, throughout the premises.

Following a confrontation wherein Shemp incapacitates Nikko, the unconscious Mr. Goodrich inadvertently discloses the machinations of the Phantom Gang. A melee ensues amidst the darkness, ultimately resulting in the apprehension of the malefactors by the Stooges. Notably, Shemp concludes the encounter by inadvertently rendering himself, Moe, Mr. Goodrich, and Larry unconscious, subsequent to his successful neutralization of the Phantom Gang utilizing a fireplace shovel.

== Cast ==
=== Credited ===
- Moe Howard as Moe
- Larry Fine as Larry
- Shemp Howard as Shemp (final short released with new footage)
- Christine McIntyre as Delores (stock footage)
- Emil Sitka as Councilman John Goodrich
- Ralph Dunn as gang leader (stock footage)

=== Uncredited ===
- Barbara Bartay as newsgirl
- Charles Knight as Crandall (stock footage)
- Duke York as Nikko (stock footage)

== Production notes ==
For Crimin' Out Loud is a reworking of 1949's Who Done It? (itself a remake of the Schilling and Lane short Pardon My Terror) using ample stock footage from the original film. The first five minutes consist of new footage filmed on June 30, 1955. The remainder of the film (save one closeup of the Stooges after Shemp is poisoned) is made up of stock footage. The title is a play on the expression, "For crying out loud!"

For Crimin' Out Loud is the last film released to contain new footage of Shemp Howard. However, it was not the last one filmed. For Crimin' Out Loud was filmed on June 30, 1955: the previous release, Flagpole Jitters, was actually filmed the next day on July 1 but the first of the two films to be released. Shemp died of a sudden heart attack on November 22, 1955, before any new films were produced.

== See also ==
- List of American films of 1956
