= Dudley Dickerson =

American actor (1906–1968)

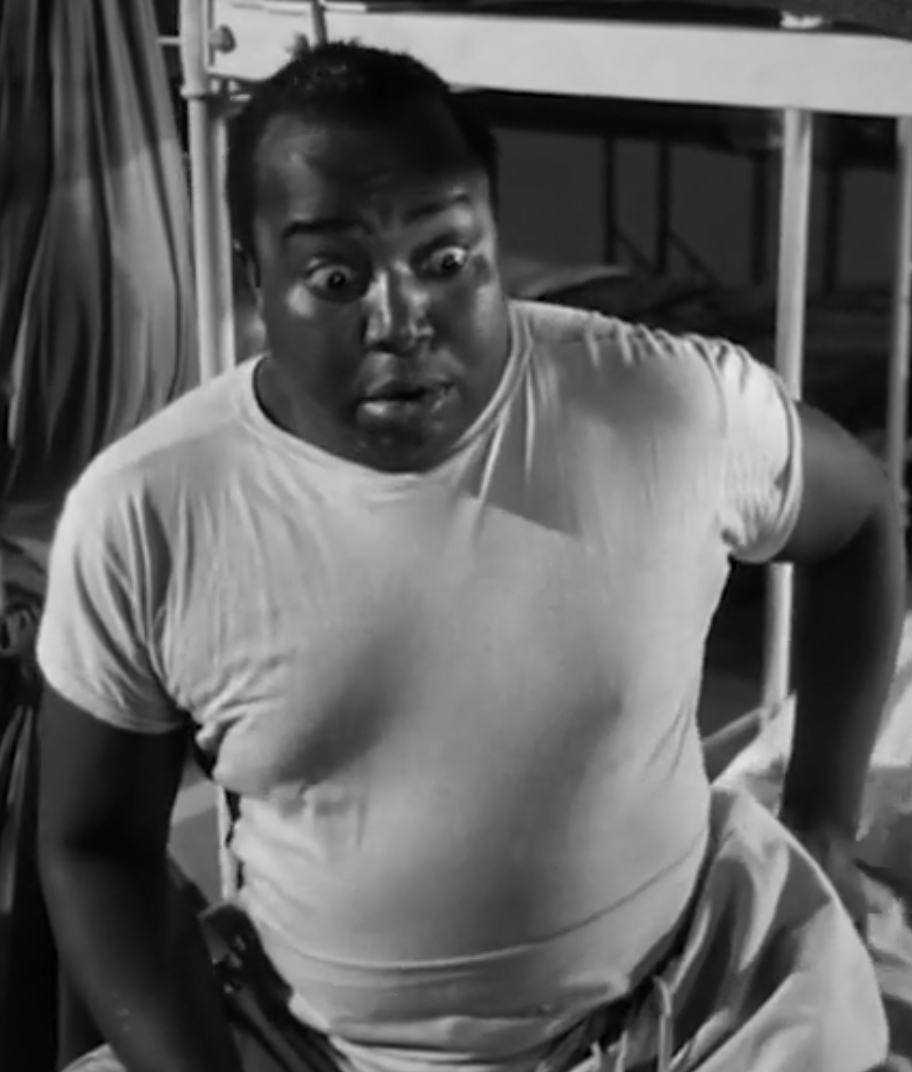
- Dickerson in Dangerous Money (1946)
- Born: Dudley Henry Dickerson Jr. November 27, 1906; Chickasha, Oklahoma, U.S.
- Died: September 23, 1968 (aged 61); Lynwood, California, U.S.
- Occupation: Actor
- Years active: 1932–1959

Dudley Henry Dickerson Jr. (November 27, 1906 – September 23, 1968) was an African-American film actor. Born in Chickasha, Oklahoma, he appeared in nearly 160 films between 1932 and 1952, and is best remembered for his roles in several Three Stooges films.

== Career ==
Considering the historical context of Dickerson's career, he was frequently assigned stereotypical roles prevalent in contemporary cinema. His inexhaustible energy is evident even within these limiting roles, and he excelled in what is now recognized as "scared reaction" comedy. One of his early screen credits was the Our Gang comedy Spooky Hooky (1936), as a bemused caretaker. Dickerson also appeared in Soundies musical films with Dorothy Dandridge and Meade Lux Lewis; Big Joe Turner had recorded three numbers for Soundies but was not present for the filming, so Dickerson stood in for him and lip-synced his vocals.

Modern viewers will remember Dudley Dickerson for his portrayals of startled cooks, quizzical orderlies, frightened porters, and apprehensive watchmen in such Three Stooges films as They Stooge to Conga, A Gem of a Jam, and Hold That Lion! In Hold that Lion, he played a lovable train conductor who bugged out his eyes and shrieked, "He'p, he'p, ah'm losin' mah mahnd!" when a lion attacked him and ripped the seat of his pants while he was shining a pair of shoes. This gag had been used by Moe in a previous short, but Dickerson's portrayal of the scene was so funny that the crew (and Dickerson himself) could hardly contain their laughter, as one can hear in the final release.

Probably Dickerson's most memorable role was that of the hapless chef in the Stooges' A Plumbing We Will Go, in which he uttered in bewilderment, "This house has sho' gone crazy!" He was also able to show the range of his acting talent in this role, able to raise a laugh from the audience by just giving a suspicious, sideways look to a kitchen appliance that had previously acted up. The footage would be recycled twice more in future Stooge comedies: 1949's Vagabond Loafers and 1956's Scheming Schemers. Both films included a newly filmed scene of a raincoat-clad Dickerson informing guests that "dinner's postponed on account of rain" (a turn of phrase usually used to describe the cancellation of a baseball game due to inclement weather).

Dickerson received featured billing in several Hugh Herbert comedies produced by Columbia Pictures, in which, as Herbert's valet, he is always in scary situations and reacts with comic terror.

In the early 1950s, Dickerson appeared in several episodes of TV's The Amos 'n' Andy Show, usually as a lodge member or Joe the Barber.

Dickerson had also appeared opposite Columbia comic Andy Clyde. When Columbia concluded its long-running Clyde series, producer Jules White called Dickerson back to appear opposite Clyde in a remake of the 1948 short Go Chase Yourself. To White's surprise, Dickerson had lost considerable weight and would no longer match the scenes filmed in 1948. White regarded Dickerson so highly that he filmed the new scenes anyway. Columbia released the film in 1956 as Pardon My Nightshirt.

Dickerson retired from acting in 1959. He died of a brain tumor in 1968 at age 61, and is buried at Lincoln Memorial Park in Los Angeles, California.

== Selected filmography ==
- Spooky Hooky (1936)
- A Day at the Races (1937)
- Shall We Dance (1937)
- Way Out West (1937)
- The Adventures of Jane Arden (1939)
- At the Circus (1939)
- You're Next! (1940)
- Knute Rockne, All American as Train Porter
- My Life with Caroline (1941)
- Criminals Within (1941)
- My Sister Eileen (1942)
- The Man Who Came to Dinner (1942)
- George Washington Slept Here (1942)
- Gung Ho! (1943)
- Kid Dynamite (1943) as Mr. Jackson
- The Adventures of Mark Twain (1944)
- Pardon My Terror (1946)
- Tall, Dark and Gruesome (1948)
- Microspook (1949)
- The Sickle or the Cross (1949)
- Between Midnight and Dawn (1950)
- The Amos 'n Andy Show (1951–1953)
- Mr. and Mrs. North (1952)
- Abbott and Costello Go to Mars (1953)
- Hook a Crook (1956)
- The Alligator People (1959)

=== With the Three Stooges, Andy Clyde, El Brendel and Hugh Herbert ===
- A Plumbing We Will Go (1940, Stooges)
- From Nurse to Worse (1940, Stooges)
- The Ring and the Belle (1940, Clyde)
- Ready, Willing but Unable (1941, Brendel)
- Host to a Ghost (1941, Clyde)
- Phoney Cronies (1942, Brendel)
- They Stooge to Conga (1943, Stooges)
- A Gem of a Jam (1943, Stooges)
- Spook to Me (1945, Clyde)
- Get Along, Little Zombie (1946, Herbert)
- Nervous Shakedown (1947, Herbert)
- Hold That Lion! (1947, Stooges)
- Should Husbands Marry? (1948, Herbert)
- Go Chase Yourself (1948, Clyde)
- Who Done It? (1949, Stooges)
- Super Wolf (1949, Herbert)
- Vagabond Loafers (1949, Stooges)
- One Shivery Night (1950, Herbert)
- Booty and the Beast (1953) (stock footage from Hold That Lion)
- Pardon My Nightshirt (1956, Clyde)
- Scheming Schemers (1956, Stooges) (stock footage from A Plumbing We Will Go and Vagabond Loafers)
