= Pardon My Terror =

1946 American short film by Edward Bernds

- Directed by: Edward Bernds
- Written by: Edward Bernds
- Produced by: Hugh McCollum
- Starring: Richard Lane; Gus Schilling; Christine McIntyre; Lynne Lyons; Philip Van Zandt; Kenneth McDonald; Dick Wessel; Vernon Dent; Emil Sitka; Dudley Dickerson
- Edited by: Paul Borofsky
- Distributed by: Columbia Pictures
- Release date: September 12, 1946 (U.S.)
- Running time: 17' 17"
- Country: United States
- Language: English

Pardon My Terror is a 1946 short film starring Richard Lane and Gus Schilling. The supporting cast also includes Christine McIntyre, Lynne Lyons, Philip Van Zandt, Kenneth McDonald, Dick Wessel, Vernon Dent, Emil Sitka and Dudley Dickerson.

== Plot ==
Private detectives Dick and Gus are asked to investigate the disappearance and possible murder of her wealthy grandfather Jonas Morton. The duo encounter houseguest Mr. Grooch and his two assistants, who are behind the goings-on, and plotting to steal the Morton fortune. Creepy butler Jarvis also seems to have an ulterior motive. Dick and Gus' presence is not appreciated, and they find themselves the targets of poison, gunfire, and an electrifying death trap.

== Production ==
Pardon My Terror was originally meant to star The Three Stooges. Director Edward Bernds had completed the script in 1946 and was ready to shoot the film after the Stooges' Half-Wits Holiday, Curly Howard's last starring film with the Stooges. Howard's untimely stroke rendered him unable to continue with the act, so Bernds jettisoned his original script and hastily rewrote it for Schilling & Lane. Schilling's part was written as a combined Curly/Larry Fine role, while Lane's was as Moe Howard.

Bernds later admitted that the rewritten script was not a good fit for Schilling & Lane and he was determined to have the Stooges film their version of Pardon My Terror. As such, he reverted to his original script, adhered Curly's previous lines for Shemp Howard (who had replaced his brother in 1946), and retitled the film Who Done It?. Who Done It? would become one of the finest comedies the team ever produced. Stooge expert Jon Solomon, author of The Complete Three Stooges: The Official Filmography and Three Stooges Companion commented that "this well-balanced mixture of physical abuse, verbal banter, and emotional surprise is particularly vibrant even for a Stooge film."

Coincidentally, Columbia Pictures actors Emil Sitka, Dudley Dickerson and Christine McIntyre appeared in both films.

Pardon My Terror is a remake of the Walter Catlett film You're Next. It was remade with Harry Langdon as To Heir as Human.
