= Listen, Judge =

1952 American short film by Edward Bernds

- Directed by: Edward Bernds
- Written by: Elwood Ullman
- Produced by: Hugh McCollum
- Starring: Moe Howard; Larry Fine; Shemp Howard; Kitty McHugh; Vernon Dent; Emil Sitka; John Hamilton
- Cinematography: Ellis W. Carter
- Edited by: Edwin H. Bryant
- Distributed by: Columbia Pictures
- Release date: March 6, 1952 (U.S.)
- Running time: 17:06
- Country: United States
- Language: English

Listen, Judge is a 1952 short subject directed by Edward Bernds starring American slapstick comedy team The Three Stooges (Moe Howard, Larry Fine and Shemp Howard). It is the 138th entry in the series released by Columbia Pictures starring the comedians, who released 190 shorts for the studio between 1934 and 1959.

== Plot ==
The Stooges are entangled in a series of mishaps stemming from their roles as repairmen. Initially accused of stealing chickens but exonerated in court, their misfortune persists when a live chicken escapes Shemp's jacket, inadvertently striking Judge Henderson. Subsequently fleeing the courtroom, they encounter a customer seeking repair for her malfunctioning doorbell.

Despite their earnest efforts, the Stooges inadvertently wreak havoc within the customer's home, culminating in a confrontation with the resident chef. Prompted by the chef's departure, the trio find themselves unexpectedly hired to cater a birthday party for George Morton, a friend of the Judge. To their dismay, they discover that the party is attended by none other than Judge Henderson himself, whose wife is their previous customer.

Under mounting pressure, the Stooges attempt to salvage the situation by preparing a dinner, facing numerous comedic obstacles along the way. A particularly calamitous moment occurs when their punctured cake is unwittingly filled with town gas, leading to a dramatic explosion during the party.

The chaotic events result in Henderson's embarrassment and jeopardize his chances of re-election. Matters escalate when George Morton's wife, Lydia, exposes the Stooges' true identities, prompting a heated confrontation that culminates in the trio being chased away by the Judge wielding a shotgun.

== Production notes ==
Filmed on November 6–8, 1951, Listen, Judge consolidates narrative components extracted from three separate Stooge films in which Curly Howard portrayed the third Stooge:

- The courtroom scene involving the accusation of chicken theft is adapted from A Plumbing We Will Go (1940).
- The segment concerning a doorbell repair originates from They Stooge to Conga (1943).
- The segments involving food preparation and the climactic exploding cake, constituting the latter portion of the film, are borrowed from An Ache in Every Stake (1941).
