= They Stooge to Conga =

1943 American short film by Del Lord

- Directed by: Del Lord
- Written by: Monte Collins; Elwood Ullman
- Produced by: Del Lord; Hugh McCollum
- Starring: Moe Howard; Larry Fine; Curly Howard; Vernon Dent; Dudley Dickerson; Stanley Brown; Lloyd Bridges; John Tyrrell
- Cinematography: George Meehan
- Edited by: Paul Borofsky
- Distributed by: Columbia Pictures
- Release date: January 1, 1943 (U.S.)
- Running time: 15:32
- Country: United States
- Language: English

They Stooge to Conga is a 1943 short subject directed by Del Lord starring American slapstick comedy team The Three Stooges (Moe Howard, Larry Fine and Curly Howard). It is the 67th entry in the series released by Columbia Pictures starring the comedians, who released 190 shorts for the studio between 1934 and 1959.

== Plot ==
The Stooges are inept repairmen who undertake the task of repairing the doorbell of a sprawling residence, unaware that it serves as the clandestine headquarters for a group of Nazi agents, led by the formidable Hans. The agents are preparing to carry out sabotage involving a remote submarine. Meanwhile, the Stooges's energetic but clueless efforts to repair the doorbell wreak havoc within the premises, causing extensive damage to the house's infrastructure and disrupting the city's telephone wire system.

When Moe and Larry enter a room that is outfitted with a swastika banner and a portrait of Adolf Hitler, they realize that they have stumbled into a nest of spies. They confront Hans and his Japanese counterpart, knocking them unconscious while impersonating Axis leaders Hitler and Hideki Tojo by assuming their attire. Curly fortuitously discovers the radio that was to be used for sabotage, and the Stooges wrest control of the hostile submarine and engineer its destruction via remote manipulation. This results in the entrapment of the enemy operatives, ultimately leading to their defeat as the Stooges prevail in overpowering their adversaries.

== Cast ==
=== Credited ===
- Moe Howard as Moe
- Larry Fine as Larry
- Curly Howard as Curly

=== Uncredited ===
- Vernon Dent as Nazi Spy Leader
- Dudley Dickerson as Chef
- Fern Emmett as Marsha
- Stanley Brown as Bomber pilot
- Frederick Giermann as U-Boat captain
- Robert Stevens as Telephone Customer
- Lloyd Bridges as Telephone Customer
- John Tyrrell as Telephone Customer / Nazi spy
- Christine McIntyre as Female Telephone Customer
- Julie Duncan as Female Telephone Customer
- Eddie Laughton as Radio announcer (voice)
- Charles Sherlock as 1st saboteur
- Dick Jensen as 2nd saboteur

== Production notes ==
They Stooge to Conga was filmed May 6–9, 1942. The film title is a parody of the 18th-century play She Stoops to Conquer.

The doorbell repair segment was reworked with Shemp Howard in 1952's Listen, Judge. The footage of the submarine jumping out of the water was recycled from Three Little Sew and Sews. A similar gag was used in the 2012 film The Three Stooges where Larry (Sean Hayes) is wearing a sandwich board.

A young Lloyd Bridges appears as "Telephone Customer #2" in one of his last uncredited roles.

This is the third Stooges short where Moe plays a parody of Adolf Hitler; the first two, with Moe portraying "Moe Hailstone" as the Hitler parody role in both, were You Nazty Spy! and its sequel I'll Never Heil Again, neither of which had any connection to this short.

This entry also marked the second time Curly says the word, "sabatoogie", a mispronouncing of "sabotage"; the first time was in 1942's Loco Boy Makes Good.

Scenes from this short were re-shot for the 2000 biopic The Three Stooges.

=== Violence ===
They Stooge to Conga is often cited as the most violent Stooge film produced during the Curly Howard era (1934–1947) DVD Talk critic Stuart Galbraith IV writes that, in its brief 15½ minutes, the film "offers several startling moments, none more gleefully sadistic as when Curly, scaling an electrical pole, within a few seconds manages to puncture the top of Moe's head, an eye, and an ear with a climbing spike, all with cringe-inducing 'ker-CHUNK' sound effects." Moe also endures physical harm, including being pulled through lath and plaster, with a real wooden pillar (not a prop) inadvertently landing on his neck. Additionally, Curly suffers various forms of abuse, including electrocution, falling from a telephone pole, severe nose twisting, and his posterior being singed via an acetylene torch.

Although Columbia short subject head/director Jules White was known for utilizing extreme violence in his films, They Stooge to Conga was in fact directed by Del Lord. White recalled the challenges of filming scenes involving physical harm to Moe. "We had trouble pulling Moe all the way through the wall. Since Moe was a full grown man, we weakened the wall and the wood inside and then replastered the wall."

==== Notable violent gags ====
- Moe and Larry attempt to enter a house simultaneously, resulting in both being thrust out by Curly wielding an anvil point.
- Curly accidentally pulls a ringing phone out of a wall, hits Moe with it, and is retaliated against when Moe throws it back.
- Moe is struck by a solid wooden plank crashing onto his neck while being pulled through a wall.
- Moe twists Curly's nose with a pipe threader and uses a grinding wheel to file it back into shape.
- Curly accidentally impales Moe on the top of his head, in his ear, and in one of his eyes with a climbing spike on his shoe while climbing a telephone pole.
- Moe burns Curly's rear end with a flame torch to motivate him to climb higher.
- Curly shocks himself while straightening a wire and again while testing the connection.
- Curly falls from a telephone pole after being zapped by wires, landing on Moe and Larry below.
- Moe places a light bulb in one of Curly's ears, which lights up, and then bursts it with a screwdriver in the other ear.
- Curly gets shocked while sliding on electrical wires, pushing him through an open window.
- The Nazi spies' cook experiences an explosion when Curly manipulates the electrical wires, leading to further mishaps with a phone and a waffle iron.
- Moe uses a hammer to hit Larry from behind, then thrusts it into Curly's mouth, resulting in Curly striking Moe 20 times with the hammer in rapid succession.
