= A Plumbing We Will Go =

1940 American short film by Del Lord

- Directed by: Del Lord
- Written by: Elwood Ullman
- Produced by: Del Lord; Hugh McCollum
- Starring: Moe Howard; Larry Fine; Curly Howard; Bess Flowers; Dudley Dickerson; John Tyrrell; Bud Jamison; Monte Collins; Eddie Laughton; Wilson Benge
- Cinematography: Benjamin H. Kline
- Edited by: Art Seid
- Distributed by: Columbia Pictures
- Release date: April 19, 1940 (U.S.)
- Running time: 17:31
- Country: United States
- Language: English

A Plumbing We Will Go is a 1940 short subject directed by Del Lord starring American slapstick comedy team The Three Stooges (Moe Howard, Larry Fine and Curly Howard). It is the 46th entry in the series released by Columbia Pictures starring the comedians, who released 190 shorts for the studio between 1934 and 1959.

== Plot ==
The Stooges are destitute vagrants, brought to trial on charges of chicken theft. Following their acquittal, the trio tries to procure a free meal by fishing in a pet shop aquarium. Officer Kelly intervenes, instigating a pursuit that compels the Stooges to adopt the guise of plumbers as a means to evade arrest.

Assuming their roles as "plumbers", the Stooges secure a position in an opulent residence. Their ineptitude unfolds dramatically, resulting in the destruction of the house's entire plumbing infrastructure. Curly, in attempting to address what he perceives as a bathroom leak, constructs a labyrinthine network of pipes, ensnaring himself. Simultaneously, Larry digs up the front lawn in an unsuccessful quest for the water shutoff valve. Moe and Curly, in their misguided efforts, connect a water pipe with another conduit containing electrical wires. This leads to water inundating every electrical appliance in the mansion, exasperating the perplexed chef. When the hostess invites her guests to view Niagara Falls on her newly acquired television set, the picture is interrupted by a deluge that bursts from the screen, soaking the entire assemblage.

The homeowner returns and expresses dismay at the havoc in his residence before falling through an unexpected hole in the floor into the basement. Moe berates him for damaging the Stooges' convoluted repair endeavors, until the trio discovers that the homeowner is none other than the judge who had previously acquitted them of charges. The Stooges hastily flee the scene, running from the aggrieved judge, his butler, law enforcement officials (notably Officer Kelly), and several police officers on motorcycles.

== Production notes ==
A Plumbing We Will Go was filmed on December 13–18, 1939, the last Stooge film produced in the 1930s. It was a remake of the Sidney and Murray short film, Plumbing for Gold (1934), and would be remade again with El Brendel and Shemp Howard as Pick a Peck of Plumbers (1944). The Stooges remade A Plumbing We Will Go as Vagabond Loafers (1949) and Scheming Schemers (1956) using stock footage. The original story in Plumbing for Gold involved searching for a lost ring which the Stooges did not use until Scheming Schemers.

Curly recreated the maze-of-pipes gag several years later in Swing Parade of 1946 (1946). Shemp Howard attempted it as well in Vagabond Loafers and Scheming Schemers, while Joe DeRita also attempted the gag in Have Rocket, Will Travel (1959). The chicken-stealing segment that opens the film was also reworked in Listen, Judge (1952).

Aside from the aforementioned reworked films, footage from A Plumbing We Will Go also reappeared in the compilation feature film Stop! Look! and Laugh! (1960).

Like A Ducking They Did Go (1939), the title is a play on the children's song, "A-Hunting We Will Go".

== Reception and legacy ==
Curly's performance in A Plumbing We Will Go is generally considered by Three Stooges fans to be one of his best. Curly himself considered A Plumbing We Will Go among his favorite Three Stooges shorts.

Director Sam Raimi paid homage to A Plumbing We Will Go—specifically the gag in which a lightbulb fills with water—in the 1981 cult horror film The Evil Dead, with a scene featuring a lightbulb filling with blood, as well as blood pouring from wall sockets.

== See also ==
- The Three Stooges filmography
