= Vagabond Loafers =

1949 American short film by Edward Bernds

- Directed by: Edward Bernds
- Written by: Elwood Ullman
- Produced by: Hugh McCollum
- Starring: Moe Howard; Larry Fine; Shemp Howard; Emil Sitka; Symona Boniface; Kenneth MacDonald; Christine McIntyre; Dudley Dickerson; Herbert Evans
- Cinematography: Vincent J. Farrar
- Edited by: Henry DeMond
- Distributed by: Columbia Pictures
- Release date: October 6, 1949 (U.S.)
- Running time: 15:51
- Country: United States
- Language: English

Vagabond Loafers is a 1949 short subject directed by Edward Bernds starring American slapstick comedy team The Three Stooges (Moe Howard, Larry Fine and Shemp Howard). It is the 118th entry in the series released by Columbia Pictures starring the comedians, who appeared in 190 shorts at the studio between 1934 and 1959.

== Plot ==
Employed as plumbers at Day and Nite Plumbers, the Stooges encounter a predicament when tasked with repairing a leaky pipe at the residence of the affluent Norfleets, who are hosting a dinner party to celebrate the acquisition of a valuable Van Brocklin painting. Moe, engrossed in studying How to Be a Plumber, grapples with the pipes in the basement, while Shemp manages to trap himself inside a maze of pipes in the bathroom. Meanwhile, Larry digs up most of the lawn in an attempt to locate the water cutoff.

Amidst their efforts, Shemp surmises that the pipes fail to work properly because they are "clogged up with wires". Subsequently, Shemp and Moe proceed to extract the electrical system from the pipes and connect a water pipe to the exposed conduit. The cook, who is in the kitchen trying to prepare an extravagant meal for the Norfleets, observes in bewilderment as the stove and chandelier gush water.

The Norfleets's television set erupts in a deluge akin to Niagara Falls as the chaos escalates, providing a backdrop for the nefarious activities of two party guests, Mr. and Mrs. Allen, who are revealed as art thieves intent on pilfering the prized Van Brocklin painting. By happenstance, the Stooges observe the thieves in action and thwart their efforts.

== Cast ==
=== Credited ===
- Moe Howard as Moe
- Larry Fine as Larry
- Shemp Howard as Shemp
- Christine McIntyre as Mrs. Allen
- Kenneth MacDonald as Mr. Allen
- Symona Boniface as Mrs. Norfleet
- Emil Sitka as Walter Norfleet
- Dudley Dickerson as The Cook
- Herbert Evans as Wilkes, the butler

=== Uncredited ===
- Judy Malcolm, Celia Travers, Cosmo Sardo, Alfred Paix as Party guests

== Production notes ==
Vagabond Loafers was filmed January 25–28, 1949; the film title parodies the romantic expression "vagabond lovers".

Vagabond Loafers is a remake of 1940's A Plumbing We Will Go, and would itself be remade in 1956 as Scheming Schemers. Shemp was teamed with comedian El Brendel for the non-Stooge film Pick a Peck of Plumbers (1944), which in itself was a remake of Sidney and Murray's Plumbing for Gold (1934).

Vagabond Loafers marked the final appearances of two prolific Stooge supporting actors: Symona Boniface and Dudley Dickerson. Dickerson reprises his role as the startled cook from A Plumbing We Will Go using a mixture of stock footage from that short and new material, something of a rarity in later patchwork Stooges shorts. However, their faces would be seen in several more Stooge films when footage featuring the actors was recycled for future productions.

This was the first Stooges short to start with a modified opening title card, which now had "Columbia Pictures Corporation Presents" at the top and a new logo for the Stooges (with one "o" on a different level from the other). This opening title card would remain in effect on all but the two 3-D films (Spooks! and Pardon My Backfire) the Stooges would make through the last short featuring footage of Shemp (Commotion on the Ocean) in 1956.
