= Who Done It? (1949 film) =

1949 American short film by Edward Bernds

- Directed by: Edward Bernds
- Written by: Edward Bernds
- Produced by: Hugh McCollum
- Starring: Moe Howard; Larry Fine; Shemp Howard; Emil Sitka; Christine McIntyre; Ralph Dunn; Duke York; Charles Knight; Dudley Dickerson
- Cinematography: Ira H. Morgan
- Edited by: Henry DeMond
- Distributed by: Columbia Pictures
- Release date: March 3, 1949 (U.S.)
- Running time: 16:44
- Country: United States
- Language: English

Who Done It? is a 1949 short subject directed by Edward Bernds starring American slapstick comedy team The Three Stooges (Moe Howard, Larry Fine and Shemp Howard). It is the 114th entry in the series released by Columbia Pictures starring the comedians, who released 190 shorts for the studio between 1934 and 1959.

== Plot ==
The Stooges are private investigators at the Alert Detective Agency, responding to a summons from the affluent Mr. Goodrich. Mr. Goodrich apprises them of the malevolent activities perpetrated by the Phantom Gang, a maleficent organization implicated in the murder of prominent socialites and opulent individuals, with Mr. Goodrich himself slated as their next victim.

Upon their arrival, the Stooges find Mr. Goodrich incapacitated and confined, with his complicit butler, who is revealed to be a member of the Phantom Gang, receiving them. Furthermore, Mr. Goodrich's niece, a member of the gang, endeavors to ensnare Shemp, culminating in an attempt to administer poison. Subsequently, the Stooges find themselves pursued by Nikko, a formidable henchman of imposing stature, throughout the premises of Mr. Goodrich.

Following a confrontation wherein Shemp incapacitates Nikko, the unconscious Mr. Goodrich unwittingly discloses the machinations of the Phantom Gang. A melee ensues amidst the darkness, resulting in the apprehension of the malefactors by the Stooges. Shemp ultimately concludes the encounter by inadvertently rendering himself, Moe, Mr. Goodrich, and Larry unconscious, subsequent to his successful neutralization of the Phantom Gang utilizing a fireplace shovel.

== Cast ==
=== Credited ===
- Moe Howard as Moe
- Larry Fine as Larry
- Shemp Howard as Shemp
- Christine McIntyre as Goodrich's Niece
- Ralph Dunn as Phantom Gang Leader
- Charles Knight as The Butler
- Emil Sitka as Mr. Goodrich
- Duke York as Nikko (The Goon)
- Dudley Dickerson as Janitor

=== Uncredited ===
- George Lloyd as Gangster in wall

== Production notes ==
Who Done It? was filmed on December 9–12, 1947, and released 15 months later on March 3, 1949. It was remade as For Crimin' Out Loud, the penultimate entry filmed featuring Shemp prior to his death in November 1955; it was released posthumously in May 1956.

Who Done It? marks the final appearance of supporting actor Duke York, who committed suicide on January 24, 1952.

=== Development ===
In 1946, Director Edward Bernds concluded the scripting process for Who Done It? with plans for its immediate production following the completion of Half-Wits Holiday, Curly Howard's final leading role alongside the Stooges ensemble. Unfortunately, Howard's incapacitation in May 1946 due to a stroke necessitated a significant alteration of plans. In response, Bernds swiftly adapted the script to accommodate Columbia Pictures comics Gus Schilling and Richard Lane, refashioning Schilling's role to encompass elements of both Curly and Larry, while assigning Lane the character of Moe. This revised rendition of Who Done It? emerged under the title Pardon My Terror, featuring a supporting cast including Emil Sitka, Dudley Dickerson, and Christine McIntyre.

Upon reflection, however, Bernds recognized the incongruity between the rewritten script and the comedic sensibilities of Schilling and Lane. Eager to restore coherence to the project, Bernds opted to revert to the original script, albeit with adjustments tailored to the comedic style of Shemp, who had rejoined the Stooges ensemble. Stooge historian Jon Solomon, author of The Complete Three Stooges: The Official Filmography and Three Stooges Companion, lauded the resulting film's adept amalgamation of physical comedy, verbal repartee, and emotional depth. Solomon particularly highlighted a scene featuring Christine McIntyre and Shemp, wherein the interplay surrounding a drugged drink and a favorite painting culminates in a comedic crescendo, deemed unprecedented within the realm of Stoogedom, characterized by Shemp's multifarious vocalizations and physical contortions.

=== Moe's injury ===
During the final day of filming, amidst the enactment of a scene portraying the Stooges' forceful entry through a door, Moe incurred an ankle sprain. Given the exigencies of production timelines, a delay was untenable; thus, Moe opted to mitigate the injury by employing tape and persevering with filming. His physical discomfort was discernible during subsequent scenes set within the hallway, characterized by a noticeable limp.
