= A Gem of a Jam =

1943 film by Del Lord

- Directed by: Del Lord
- Written by: Del Lord
- Produced by: Hugh McCollum
- Starring: Moe Howard; Larry Fine; Curly Howard; Dudley Dickerson; Al Hill; Fred Kelsey; John Tyrrell; Frank O'Connor; Al Thompson
- Cinematography: John Stumar
- Edited by: Paul Borofsky
- Distributed by: Columbia Pictures
- Release date: December 30, 1943 (U.S.)
- Running time: 16:27
- Country: United States
- Language: English

A Gem of a Jam is a 1943 short subject directed by Del Lord starring American slapstick comedy team The Three Stooges (Moe Howard, Larry Fine and Curly Howard). It is the 76th entry in the series released by Columbia Pictures starring the comedians, who released 190 shorts for the studio between 1934 and 1959.

== Plot ==
The Stooges are janitors employed at a medical facility during the nocturnal hours. The narrative unfolds through a series of comedic mishaps, commencing with Moe's inadvertent electric shock incident, resulting in an impromptu performance resembling a Cossack dance. Subsequently, Curly becomes ensnared with his head trapped inside a fishbowl, prompting a sequence wherein Moe and Larry endeavor to dislodge the vessel, eventually succeeding but inadvertently evoking sensations of internal tickling within Curly instigated by an ingested goldfish.

Following an attempted escape after a robbery, a fugitive criminal sustains a gunshot wound to his arm and seeks refuge. Mistaking the doctor's office for a functional medical facility, the criminals bring their injured comrade to the Stooges. The Stooges, assuming the roles of physicians, administer unconventional anesthesia with a rubber mallet. The Stooges, distracted with their backs turned, accidentally dislodge the criminal from the gurney, causing him to descend through a nearby window and land directly in a waiting police vehicle stationed below. Subsequently, witnessing the ensuing chaos, the remaining criminals hastily flee but are eventually apprehended by law enforcement authorities.

Seeking refuge from the ensuing pandemonium, the Stooges retreat to a foreboding storage area, encountering a jittery night watchman and an array of eerie artifacts, including a sizable jack-in-the-box. Amidst the chaos, Curly becomes encased in rapidly drying plaster, rendering him immobile and assuming a ghostly appearance. Consequently, his unintentional frightful presence ends up scaring all involved.

== Production notes ==
A Gem of a Jam was filmed on June 12–16, 1943. The Stooges released more short subjects in 1943 than any other year at Columbia Pictures, A Gem of a Jam being the tenth entry.

The gag of Curly stepping out of a trough appearing as a ghost first appeared in the 1934 Laurel and Hardy film The Live Ghost. When the night watchman (Dudley Dickerson) backs into the mannequin, he shouts, "I'm losing my mind!" This line, however, has been muted for television broadcasts and home video releases. The first Three Stooges short to feature the swing rendition of "3 Blind Mice," during the closing fade-out. The closing theme would be used again at the end of Busy Buddies.
