= Pies and Guys =

1958 film by Jules White

- Directed by: Jules White
- Written by: Jack White
- Produced by: Jules White
- Starring: Moe Howard; Larry Fine; Joe Besser; Greta Thyssen; Milton Frome; Gene Roth; Emil Sitka; Harriette Tarler; Helen Dickson
- Cinematography: Irving Lippman
- Edited by: Harold White
- Distributed by: Columbia Pictures
- Release date: June 12, 1958 (U.S.)
- Running time: 16:20
- Country: United States
- Language: English

Pies and Guys is a 1958 short subject directed by Jules White starring American slapstick comedy team The Three Stooges (Moe Howard, Larry Fine and Joe Besser). It is the 185th entry in the series released by Columbia Pictures starring the comedians, who released 190 shorts for the studio between 1934 and 1959.

== Plot ==
In the third Stooge adaptation of the 1913 play Pygmalion by George Bernard Shaw, the Stooges assume the roles of repairmen who inadvertently cause a commotion in the presence of two psychologists, Professors Quackenbush and Sedletz. A wager ensues between the two academics, with Quackenbush asserting that he can refine the Stooges into gentlemen through environmental conditioning. Despite the professor's best efforts, the process proves to be arduous and exasperating, leading to moments of frustration as he attempts to instill proper etiquette and demeanor in the Stooges.

Amidst the training, the Stooges engage in flirtatious encounters with the professor's assistant, while gradually assimilating elements of refined behavior, notably in table etiquette. The culmination of their transformation is tested at a lavish society party, where their conduct will determine the outcome of the bet.

Predictably, chaos ensues at the party. Joe's unconventional greeting of the esteemed Countess Spritzwasser by biting off the diamond from her ring sets the tone for a series of mishaps. Moe and Larry, realizing the gravity of the situation, attempt to reprimand Joe in private, only to discover that he has pilfered a trove of silverware.

Subsequently, Joe's attempt to consume an entire pie in one gulp prompts a desperate intervention from Moe, who inadvertently triggers a sequence of events culminating in the pie becoming stuck to the ceiling. The arrival of Mrs. Smythe-Smythe, an esteemed guest, further complicates matters, with Moe's attempts to evade her scrutiny resulting in a comedic misunderstanding. Ultimately, a chain reaction ensues, leading to a chaotic pie melee that ensnares all present.

== Production notes ==
Pies and Guys is a scene-for-scene remake of 1947's Half-Wits Holiday, using recurring stock footage from the original. Half-Wits Holiday in itself was a reworking of 1935's Hoi Polloi. New footage was shot in two days on May 6–7, 1957.
