= Emil Sitka =

American actor (1914–1998)

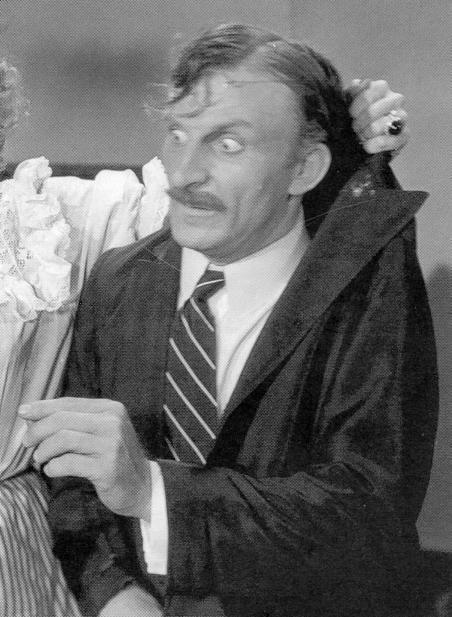
- Sitka, as he appeared in Brideless Groom (1947)
- Born: December 22, 1914; Johnstown, Pennsylvania, U.S.
- Died: January 16, 1998 (aged 83); Camarillo, California, U.S.
- Occupation: Actor
- Years active: 1930s–1992
- Spouses: Donna Driscoll (m. 1942; div. 1969) Edith Weber (m. 1971; died 1981)
- Children: 6
- Website: emilsitka.com

Emil Sitka (December 22, 1914 – January 16, 1998) was an American actor who appeared in hundreds of movies, short films, and television shows, and who is best known for his numerous appearances with The Three Stooges. He was the unofficial "last Stooge", since he was tapped to be the new middle Stooge when Larry Fine suffered a stroke in 1970. He is one of only two actors to have worked with all six Stooges (Shemp Howard, Moe Howard, Larry Fine, Curly Howard, Joe Besser, and Joe DeRita) on film in the various incarnations of the group (Harold Brauer, a recurring villain who appeared in three 1940s shorts, was the other).

Sitka served the role of a literal "stooge," or straight man, to the Three Stooges throughout nearly 40 of their short films, most of which were filmed during Shemp's run as the third stooge. In addition to one single appearance during Curly's run with the trio, and a limited number of appearances during Besser's, Sitka returned as a near-regular character when the trio returned to film and television with DeRita. His frequent appearances with the trio, and his role as stooge to the stooges, earned him the informal title of being the "fourth stooge".

After Fine had a stroke in 1970, Sitka was initially considered to replace him which would've had him perform alongside Moe and DeRita as "The Middle Stooge". However, despite being announced as a Stooge, he never performed beyond posing for a few publicity photographs in character as Moe died from a heart attack.

== Early life ==
Sitka was born in Johnstown, Pennsylvania in 1914. He was the oldest of five children, born of Slovak immigrant parents. His father, Emil Sitka Sr., a coal miner, died of black lung disease when Sitka was 12 years old, and his mother, Helena (Matula) Sitka, was hospitalized, unable to take care of the children. His siblings were placed in foster homes, but Sitka went to live in a church in Pittsburgh, Pennsylvania with a Catholic priest for the next few years.

At this time, he became an altar boy and made plans to enter the priesthood, and had his first acting opportunity in the church's annual Passion Play. At the age of 16, he and one of his brothers traveled across the United States looking for work. After a year, they returned to Pittsburgh, where Sitka found a job working in a factory. He stayed there until the great St. Patrick's Day Pittsburgh Flood of 1936, after which he departed to pursue his dream of acting in Hollywood, California.

== Acting career ==
=== Early acting experience ===
Sitka found inexpensive lodging in a small acting theater, doing handiwork to pay his rent, and gradually acting in small parts in the theater. With time and experience, the parts became larger, and eventually Sitka was directing plays as well. Since the theater did not pay, Emil always kept a job as a civil engineer to pay the bills as well as support his acting career at night. By 1946, he had played dozens, if not hundreds, of roles; this breadth of experience would help him in his later film career, playing everything from butler to lawyer to businessman to construction worker.

=== In films ===
In 1946, Sitka was leading his own acting troupe when he was spotted by a talent scout for Columbia Pictures. He was told to contact Jules White, head of Columbia Pictures' short film department, and he was cast in a short film that White was directing – Hiss and Yell, starring Barbara Jo Allen as her character "Vera Vague." Hiss and Yell was nominated for an Academy Award. Several months later, he was cast in his first Three Stooges film, Half-Wits Holiday, where he played the role of Sappington, the first footman.

At the time, this episode was also the final starring role of Curly Howard, who suffered a stroke off-screen that marked the end of his career, thus making Half-Wits Holiday one of only two shorts where Emil and Curly appeared together. The other short was Hold that Lion. Sitka went on to appear in dozens of Three Stooges short films, as well as most of their feature films, and the live action segments for The New Three Stooges 1965 cartoon series.

Sitka is best remembered for his association with the Three Stooges and with one line in particular which he repeated several times: "Hold hands, you lovebirds!" from Brideless Groom (one of the four Three Stooges shorts that lapsed into the public domain and thus was distributed freely and widely).

In January 1970, Larry Fine suffered a stroke during the filming of Kook's Tour. Plans were in the works for Sitka to replace him as the Middle Stooge in early 1970 when Moe's grandson was working on a movie that called for having the Three Stooges in it. The project was called off after financing fell through, with Sitka resuming his previous activities. When Moe got a movie offer for the Stooges in 1974, he called Sitka and Joe DeRita together for accepting the offer, and he commenced a full-fledged revival of the Three Stooges as a current act. But nothing other than a few promotional pictures were ever made. This proposed version of the group never transpired due to Moe falling ill and dying shortly after its conception.

== "Hold hands, you lovebirds" ==
In the Three Stooges short Brideless Groom (1947), Shemp Howard must be married before 6:00 p.m. in order to inherit $500,000. After striking out, Shemp finally finds a girl willing to marry him, and they rush off to a justice of the peace (Sitka). As he starts the ceremony, initially telling the couple to "hold hands, you lovebirds", the other girls that turned down Shemp's proposal burst in, having heard of the inheritance. A free-for-all then ensues, with poor Sitka being struck again and again, attempting to start the ceremony, each time more disheveled and his "hold hands, you lovebirds" rather weaker.

Because of the widespread distribution of this short (it is one of four Three Stooges shorts that slipped into the public domain and was broadcast countless times on local television stations as a result), this scene is the one that Sitka has become best known for.

Notably, a clip of this short is featured in Pulp Fiction (1994), for which Sitka's name even appears in the credits as "Hold Hands You Lovebirds." Emil also utters the phrase in his cameo as a supermarket customer in the horror film Intruder (1989).

== Later years ==
Sitka continued his acting career, more out of love for acting than the need for money, appearing in films as late as 1992. He was in demand at various Three Stooges conventions, and he had numerous requests from Three Stooges fans to appear at their wedding to say "Hold hands, you lovebirds!"

Additionally, Sitka appeared as a contestant on Let's Make a Deal in 1985, bringing along a drawing of silent film star Ben Turpin, which host Monty Hall remarked on when choosing him. After being given $500 by Hall and offered the chance to trade it for an unknown item, Sitka opted to keep the money and avoided a "zonk" prize of his-and-hers garbage cans.

== Personal life ==
Sitka and his first wife, Donna Driscoll, married in the 1940s and divorced in the 1960s. He married his long-time girlfriend Edith Weber in the 1970s; they were married until her death in 1981.

Sitka had seven children by his first marriage: two daughters (Elonka and Little-Star) and five sons (Rudigor, Storm, Tao, Darrow, and Saxon). Saxon carries on his father's legacy by appearing at Stooge conventions as often as possible.

== Death ==
While hosting several Stooge fans in his home in 1997, Sitka suffered a massive stroke and never regained consciousness (one fan was a certified EMT and was able to keep Sitka alive until paramedics arrived). He died on January 16, 1998, in Camarillo, California, less than a month after his 83rd birthday.

He is interred next to his wife Edith at Conejo Mountain Memorial Park in Camarillo. As a tribute to his tenure with the Stooges, Sitka's gravestone reads "Hold hands, you lovebirds!", as well as "He danced all the way."

== Selected filmography ==
- One Exciting Week (1946) as Councilman (uncredited)
- Half-Wits Holiday (1947, Short) as Sappington (uncredited)
- Hold That Lion! (1947, Short) as Attorney
- Brideless Groom (1947, Short) as Justice of the Peace J.M. Benton (uncredited)
- All Gummed Up (1947, Short) as Amos Flint
- Joe Palooka in Fighting Mad (1948) as Photographer
- Pardon My Clutch (1948, Short) as Professor Otto Klink (uncredited)
- Blondie's Secret (1948) as Grocery Store Clerk (uncredited)
- "Who Done It?" (1949, Short) as Mr. John Goodrich
- The Beautiful Blonde from Bashful Bend (1949) as Hoodlum (uncredited)
- Fuelin' Around (1949, Short) as Prof. Sneed
- Blondie Hits the Jackpot (1949) as Swedish Plaster Mixer (uncredited)
- Vagabond Loafers (1949, Short) as Mr. Walter Norfleet
- Jerks of All Trades (1949, TV Pilot) as Mr. Pennyfeather (uncredited)
- Feudin' Rhythm (1949) as Comic Actor (uncredited)
- And Baby Makes Three (1949) as Baseball Fan (uncredited)
- Punchy Cowpunchers (1950, Short) as Capt. Daley
- Hugs and Mugs (1950, Short) as Clerk (uncredited)
- The Good Humor Man (1950) as Street Cleaner (uncredited)
- Beware of Blondie (1950) as Trash Collector (uncredited)
- Rock Island Trail (1950) as Railroad Fireman in Bar (uncredited)
- Kill the Umpire (1950) as Irate Baseball Fan (uncredited)
- Texas Dynamo (1950) as Turkey
- Three Hams on Rye (1950, Short) as B.K. Doaks
- The Fuller Brush Girl (1950) as Man Stomping on Hair Follicle (uncredited)
- Slaphappy Sleuths (1950, Short) as Emil, a Customer
- Emergency Wedding (1950) as Man in Department Store (uncredited)
- Gasoline Alley (1951) as Martini (uncredited)
- Bowery Battalion (1951) as Albert - Officers Club Waiter (uncredited)
- Fighting Coast Guard (1951) as Chief Boatswain Mate (uncredited)
- Scrambled Brains (1951, Short) as Doctor Geseundheit
- Let's Go Navy! (1951) as Mailman (uncredited)
- A Millionaire for Christy (1951) as Moving Man (uncredited)
- Merry Mavericks (1951, Short) as Mort (uncredited)
- Corky of Gasoline Alley (1951) as House Painter / Irate Neighbor (uncredited)
- The Well (1951) as Lunch Counter Customer (uncredited)
- The Tooth Will Out (1951, Short) as Italian Chef (uncredited)
- Hula-La-La (1951, Short) as Mr. Baines
- The Sea Hornet (1951) as Waiter
- Pest Man Wins (1951, Short) as Meadows
- Harem Girl (1952) as Abdul's Servant (uncredited)
- Listen, Judge (1952, Short) as The Chef
- Gobs and Gals (1952) as Dressing Man (uncredited)
- Sound Off (1952) as Waiter (uncredited)
- Gents in a Jam (1952, Short) as Uncle Phineas Bowman
- Tropical Heat Wave (1952) as Uniformed Police Officer (uncredited)
- All Ashore (1953) as Bartender (uncredited)
- Loose Loot (1953, Short) as Atty. Poole (uncredited) (stock footage)
- A Perilous Journey (1953) as Drunk (uncredited)
- Gun Belt (1953) as Townsman (uncredited)
- Bubble Trouble (1953, Short) as Amos Flint / Gorilla
- Private Eyes (1953) as Patient in Wheelchair (uncredited)
- Geraldine (1953) as Engineer (uncredited)
- Jungle Gents (1954) as Boat Crewman (uncredited)
- Carolina Cannonball (1955) as Technician
- Timberjack (1955) as Jim (uncredited)
- Three for the Show (1955) as First Taxicab Driver (uncredited)
- Blackboard Jungle (1955) as Father (uncredited)
- Gypped in the Penthouse (1955) as Charlie
- Stone Age Romeos (1955) as B. Bopper
- Jail Busters (1955) as Mug Shot Photographer (uncredited)
- My Sister Eileen (1955) as Bit Welder (uncredited)
- The Spoilers (1955) as Miner (uncredited)
- Husbands Beware (1956) as J.M. Benton - Justice of the Peace (uncredited)
- For Crimin' Out Loud (1956) as Councilman John Goodrich (archive footage)
- Hot Stuff (1956) as Professor Sneed (archive footage)
- Crashing Las Vegas (1956) as Man in Seat 87 (uncredited)
- Thunder Over Arizona (1956) as Man Hit by Pie (uncredited)
- Scheming Schemers (1956) as Mr. Walter Norfleet
- The White Squaw (1956) as Texas Jim (uncredited)
- Commotion on the Ocean (1956) as Smitty
- Affair in Reno (1956) as Cashier (uncredited)
- The Phantom Stagecoach (1957) as Johnson (uncredited)
- The 27th Day (1957) as Newspaper Hawker (uncredited)
- Horsing Around (1957) as Circus Attendant
- Outer Space Jitters (1957) as Professor Jones
- Return to Warbow (1958) as Townsman (uncredited)
- Quiz Whizz (1958) as J.J. Figby
- Pies and Guys (1958) as Sappington
- Flying Saucer Daffy (1958) as Mr. Barton—President of 'Facts and Figures' Magazine
- Who Was That Lady? (1960) as Man with Flower Pot (uncredited)
- The Three Stooges Meet Hercules (1962) as Shepherd / Refreshment Man
- The Three Stooges in Orbit (1962) as Professor Danforth
- 13 Frightened Girls (1963) as Ludwig (uncredited)
- The Three Stooges Go Around the World in a Daze (1963) as Butler at Men's Club (uncredited)
- The Outlaws Is Coming (1965) as Mr. Abernathy / Witch doctor / Cavalry colonel
- Who's Minding the Mint? (1967) as Janitor (uncredited)
- The Mad Room (1969) as Workman (uncredited)
- Watermelon Man (1970) as Delivery Man
- Crimewave (1985) as Colonel Rodgers
- Intruder (1989) as Mr. Abernathy
- The Nutt House (1992) as Geeves (final film role)
- Pulp Fiction (1994) as 'Hold Hands You Love Birds' (archive footage)
