= Scheming Schemers =

1956 film by Jules White

- Directed by: Jules White; Edward Bernds (stock footage)
- Screenplay by: Jack White
- Story by: Elwood Ullman
- Produced by: Jules White
- Starring: Moe Howard; Larry Fine; Shemp Howard; Joe Palma; Emil Sitka; Kenneth MacDonald; Christine McIntyre; Symona Boniface; Dudley Dickerson
- Cinematography: Ray Cory
- Edited by: Harold White
- Distributed by: Columbia Pictures
- Release date: October 4, 1956 (U.S.)
- Running time: 15:54
- Country: United States
- Language: English

Scheming Schemers is a 1956 short subject directed by Jules White starring American slapstick comedy team The Three Stooges (Moe Howard, Larry Fine and Shemp Howard). It is the 173rd entry in the series released by Columbia Pictures starring the comedians, who released 190 shorts for the studio between 1934 and 1959.

== Plot ==
The Stooges are all-night plumbers, hired to retrieve a valuable ring that fell down a drain at the opulent Norfleet mansion. Mr. Norfleet is hosting an elegant party and hopes that the plumbers won't disturb his guests. Despite initial success in locating the ring, Larry inadvertently propels the jewel back down the drain. The Stooges investigate the plumbing in the basement, and make matters worse by confusing the water pipes with the electrical system. The ensuing spectacle causes water to cascade from unexpected sources. Meanwhile, Shemp goes upstairs with his tools to work in the bathtub.

The theft of the prized Van Brocklin painting by party guests Mr. and Mrs. Allen further complicates the situation, escalating Mr. Norfleet's anxiety. Moe and Larry discover Allen with the painting and detain him with the only weapon at hand -- a cream pie. A pie fight breaks out in the mansion, and Allen is finally subdued and captured. Mr. Norfleet, overjoyed by the recovery of the ring and the painting, offers the Stooges a generous reward. Moe and Larry wonder where Shemp is: he's still standing in the upstairs bathtub, ensnared in a tangle of pipes.

== Cast ==
=== Credited ===
- Moe Howard as Moe
- Larry Fine as Larry
- Shemp Howard as Shemp (stock footage, filmed in 1949)
  - Joe Palma as Shemp (body double, filmed in 1956)
- Emil Sitka as Walter Norfleet
- Kenneth MacDonald as Mr. Allen
- Christine McIntyre as Mrs. Allen (stock footage, filmed in 1949)
  - Connie Cezon as Mrs. Allen (body double, filmed in 1956)
- Dudley Dickerson as Chef (stock footage, filmed in 1940 and 1949)

=== Uncredited ===
- Symona Boniface as Mrs. Norfleet (stock footage, filmed in 1949)
- Herbert Evans as Wilkes, butler (stock footage, filmed in 1949)
- Helen Dickson as indignant party guest (stock footage, filmed in 1946)
- Victor Travers as sleeping party guest (stock footage, filmed in 1946)
- Al Thompson as party guest (stock footage, filmed in 1946)
- Judy Malcolm as party guest (stock footage, filmed in 1946)

== Production notes ==
Scheming Schemers is a remake of Vagabond Loafers, which in itself was a remake of A Plumbing We Will Go with former Stooge Curly Howard; additional pie fight footage was borrowed from Half-Wits Holiday. This makes Scheming Schemers the only Three Stooges short to include footage from three previous short subjects. This film is also the last to contain new footage with longtime Stooges supporting actor Kenneth MacDonald.

== "Fake Shemp" ==
Shemp Howard died in November 1955 after completing four Stooge comedies for that year. However, the Three Stooges were contractually obligated to deliver eight comedies to Columbia Pictures annually. To fulfill this requirement, producer Jules White devised a method to produce four additional shorts "featuring Shemp" by using existing footage of Howard and supplementing it with newly filmed scenes featuring stand-in Joe Palma. This technique, which involves using a body double to complete an unfinished film, has since been termed "Fake Shemp," a phrase popularized by producer Sam Raimi during the production of his feature film The Evil Dead.

In Scheming Schemers, screenwriter Jack White's clever scripting allows Moe and Larry to work as a two-man team for much of the short, with Shemp seen only intermittently. Moe and Larry leave for their assignment, separating from Shemp. Joe Palma, standing in for Shemp, catches up with Moe and Larry somewhat later. Palma appears with his back to the camera, honking the horn of the Stooges' Jeep. He is then shown gathering several pipes, strategically obscuring his face from view. The sole line of "new" dialogue attributed to Shemp — "Hold yer horses, will ya?" — was in fact Shemp's voice, repurposed from the soundtrack of a recent Stooge short, Creeps (originally filmed in 1949 for The Ghost Talks). This new footage with Palma was filmed on January 16, 1956, six weeks after Shemp's passing.

== See also ==
- List of American films of 1956
