= The Three Stooges =

American slapstick comedy trio (1922–1970)

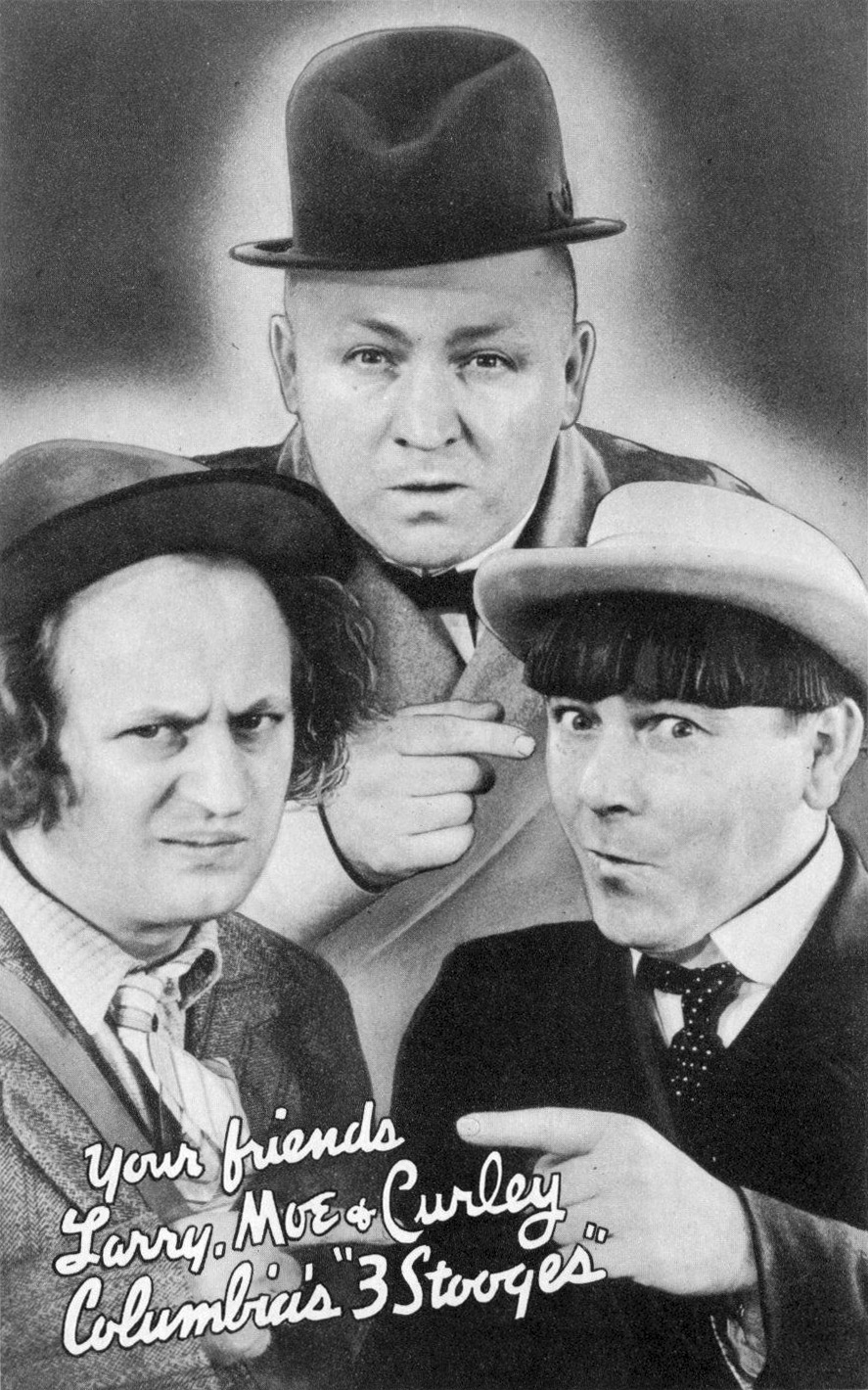
- The Three Stooges in 1937: (clockwise from left) Larry Fine, Curly Howard, and Moe Howard
- Notable work: Disorder in the Court, Punch Drunks, Men in Black, Brideless Groom, Three Little Pigskins, You Nazty Spy!, A Plumbing We Will Go, Malice in the Palace, Sing a Song of Six Pants, An Ache in Every Stake

Comedy career
- Years active: 1922–1970
- Medium: Vaudeville, film, television
- Genres: Farce, slapstick, musical comedy
- Former members: Moe Howard; Shemp Howard; Larry Fine; Curly Howard; Joe Besser; "Curly" Joe DeRita

The Three Stooges were an American vaudeville and comedy troupe active from 1922 until 1970, best remembered for their 190 short-subject films by Columbia Pictures. Their hallmark styles were physical, farce, and slapstick comedy. Six Stooges appeared over the act's run, with only three working at any time. The two constants were Moe Howard and Larry Fine. The "third stooge" was played in turn by Shemp Howard, Curly Howard, Shemp again, Joe Besser, and "Curly Joe" DeRita.

The act began in 1922 as part of a vaudeville comedy act consisting originally of Ted Healy and Moe Howard. Over time, they were joined by Moe's brother, Shemp Howard, and then Larry Fine. The troupe became known as "Ted Healy and His Stooges" ("stooges" being a show-business term for on-stage assistants). The foursome appeared in one feature film, Soup to Nuts, before Shemp left to pursue a solo career. He was replaced by his and Moe's younger brother, Jerome "Curly" Howard, in 1932. Two years later, after appearing in several movies, the trio left Healy and signed on to appear in their own short-subject comedies for Columbia Pictures, then billed as "The Three Stooges". From 1934 to 1946, Moe, Larry, and Curly starred in more than 90 short comedies for Columbia.

Curly suffered a debilitating stroke in May 1946. Shemp returned, reconstituting the original lineup, until his death of a heart attack on November 22, 1955, three years and ten months after Curly's death of a cerebral hemorrhage. Film actor Joe Palma stood in (shot from behind to obscure his face) to complete four Shemp-era shorts under contract. The procedure of disguising one actor as another outside of stunt shots became known as the "fake Shemp". Columbia contract player Joe Besser joined as the third Stooge for two years (1956–1958), departing in 1958 to nurse his ill wife after Columbia terminated its shorts division. The studio then released all the shorts via Screen Gems, Columbia's television studio and distribution unit. Screen Gems then syndicated the shorts to television, whereupon the Stooges became one of the most popular comedy acts of the early 1960s.

Comic actor Joe DeRita became "Curly Joe" in 1958, replacing Besser for a new series of full-length theatrical films. With intense television exposure in the United States, the act regained momentum throughout the 1960s as popular kids' fare, until Larry's paralyzing stroke in the midst of filming a pilot for a Three Stooges TV series in January 1970. He died in January 1975 after a further series of strokes. Attempts were made in 1970 and 1975 to revive the act with longtime supporting actor Emil Sitka in Fine's role, but they were each cut short—the first by a movie deal falling through and Moe's wife persuading him to retire, the second by Moe's death.

== History ==
=== Ted Healy and His Stooges (1922–1934) ===
The Three Stooges began in 1922 as part of a raucous vaudeville act called "Ted Healy and His Stooges". The act was also known as "Ted Healy and His Southern Gentlemen" and "Ted Healy and His Racketeers". Moe Howard joined Healy's act in 1922, and his brother Shemp Howard came aboard a few months later. After several shifts and changes in the Stooges membership, violinist-comedian Larry Fine also joined the group sometime between 1925 and 1928. In the act, lead comedian Healy would attempt to sing or tell jokes while his noisy assistants would keep interrupting him, causing Healy to retaliate with verbal and physical abuse.

In 1930, Ted Healy and His Stooges (plus comedian Fred Sanborn) appeared in Soup to Nuts, their first Hollywood feature film, released by Fox Film Corporation. The film was not a critical success, but the Stooges' performances were singled out as memorable, leading Fox to offer the trio a contract, minus Healy. This enraged Healy, who told studio executives the Stooges were his employees, whereupon the offer was withdrawn. Howard, Fine, and Howard learned of the offer and subsequent withdrawal, and left Healy to form their own act (billed as "Howard, Fine & Howard" or "Three Lost Souls"). The act quickly took off with a tour of the theater circuit. Healy attempted to stop the new act with legal action, claiming that they were using his copyrighted material. Accounts exist of Healy threatening to bomb theaters if Howard, Fine, and Howard ever performed there, which worried Shemp so much that he almost left the act; reportedly, only a pay raise kept him on board.

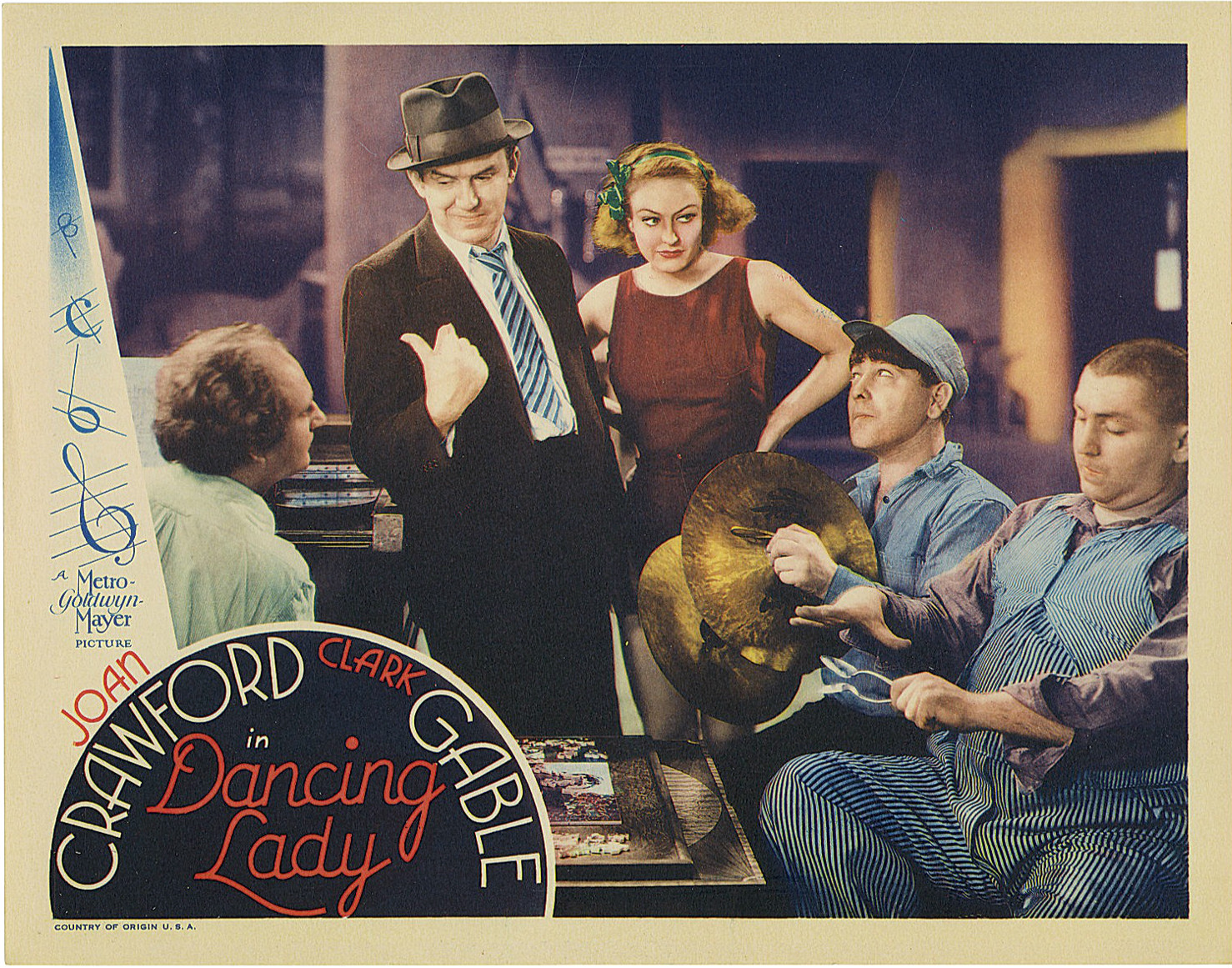
Lobby card with Ted Healy, Joan Crawford and the Stooges in MGM's Dancing Lady (1933)

Healy tried to save his act by hiring replacement stooges, but they were inexperienced and not as well-received as their predecessors. Healy reached a new agreement with his former Stooges in 1932, with Moe then acting as business manager, and they were booked in a production of Jacob J. Shubert's The Passing Show of 1932. During rehearsals, Healy received a more lucrative offer and found a loophole in his contract allowing him to leave the production. Shemp, fed up with Healy's abrasiveness, bad temper, and heavy drinking, decided to quit the act and toured in his own comedy revue for several months.

Shemp had been working for the Vitaphone studio in Brooklyn, New York since 1931. He first appeared in movie comedies playing small roles and bits in the Roscoe Arbuckle shorts, and gradually worked his way up to star comedian. Shemp stayed with Vitaphone through 1937.

With Shemp gone, Healy and the two remaining stooges (Moe and Larry) needed a replacement, so Moe suggested his younger brother Jerry Howard. Healy reportedly took one look at Jerry, who had long chestnut-red hair and a handlebar mustache, and remarked that Jerry did not look like he was funny. Jerry left the room and returned a few minutes later with his head shaved (although his mustache remained for a time), saying: "Boy, do I look girly." Healy heard "Curly", and the name stuck. Other accounts have been given for how the Curly character actually came about.

Metro-Goldwyn-Mayer (MGM) signed Healy and his stooges to a movie contract in 1933. They appeared in feature films and short subjects together, individually, or with various combinations of actors. The trio was featured in a series of musical comedy shorts, beginning with Nertsery Rhymes. It was one of a few shorts to be made with an early two-color Technicolor process. These also included one featuring Curly without Healy or the other Stooges, Roast-Beef and Movies (1934), and the recently rediscovered Technicolor short Hello Pop (1933). Jail Birds of Paradise (1934) was also shot in Technicolor, but as of 2022, no print has been found. The short films were built around recycled Technicolor film footage of production numbers cut from MGM musicals, such as Children of Pleasure, Lord Byron of Broadway, and the unfinished March of Time (all 1930). The studio concluded the series with standard, black-and-white two-reel subjects: Beer and Pretzels (1933) Plane Nuts (1933), and The Big Idea (1934).

Healy and company also appeared in several MGM feature films as comic relief, including:

- Turn Back the Clock (1933)
- Meet the Baron (1933)
- Dancing Lady (1933) (with Joan Crawford, Clark Gable, Fred Astaire and Robert Benchley)
- Fugitive Lovers (1934)
- Hollywood Party (1934).

Healy and the Stooges also appeared together in Myrt and Marge for Universal Pictures.

In 1934, the team's contract expired with MGM, and the Stooges' professional association with Healy came to an end. According to Moe Howard's autobiography, the split was precipitated by Healy's alcoholism and abrasiveness. Their final film with Healy was MGM's Hollywood Party (1934). Healy and the Stooges went on to separate successes, with Healy dying under mysterious circumstances in 1937.

=== Columbia years (1934–1958) ===
==== Moe, Larry, and Curly (1934–1946) ====
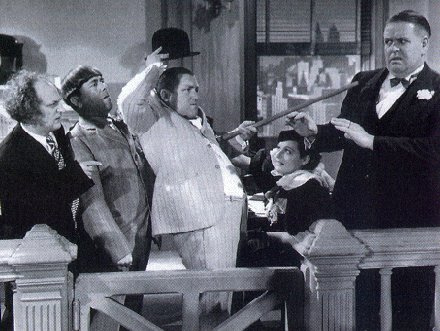

Disorder in the Court (1936), one of four frequently broadcast Stooges shorts in the public domain

In 1934, the trio—then officially named "The Three Stooges"—contracted with Columbia Pictures for a series of two-reel comedy short subjects. Moe wrote in his autobiography that they each received $600 per week (equal to $14,440 today) on a one-year contract with a renewable option; in the Ted Okuda–Edward Watz book The Columbia Comedy Shorts, the Stooges are said to have received $1,000 among them for their first Columbia effort, Woman Haters (1934), and then signed a term contract for $7,500 per film (equal to $180,504 today), to be divided among the trio.

Within their first year at Columbia, theater bookings for the Stooges films took off. Columbia Pictures president Harry Cohn was able to use the Stooges as leverage, as the demand for their films was so great that he eventually refused to supply exhibitors with the trio's shorts unless they also agreed to book some of the studio's mediocre B movies. Cohn also saw to it that the Stooges remained unaware of their popularity. During their 23 years at Columbia, the Stooges were never completely aware of their drawing power. Their contracts with the studio included an open option that had to be renewed yearly, and Cohn would tell them that the short subjects were in decline, which was not a complete fabrication (Cohn's yearly mantra was "the market for comedy shorts is dying out, fellas").

The Stooges thought that their days were numbered and would sweat it out each year, with Cohn renewing their contract at the last moment. This deception kept the insecure Stooges unaware of their true value, resulting in them having second thoughts about asking for a better contract without a yearly option. Cohn's scare tactics worked for all 23 years that the Stooges were at Columbia; the team never once asked for or received a salary increase.

After they stopped making the shorts in December 1957, Moe learned of Cohn's tactics, what a valuable commodity the Stooges had been for the studio, and how many millions more the act could have earned. Columbia offered theater owners an entire program of two-reel comedies (15–25 titles annually) featuring such stars as Buster Keaton, Andy Clyde, Charley Chase, and Hugh Herbert, but the Stooge shorts were the most popular of all.

The Stooges' release schedule was eight short subjects per year, filmed within a 40-week period; for the remaining 12 weeks, they were free to pursue other employment, time that was either spent with their families or touring the country with their live act. The Stooges appeared in 190 film shorts and five features while at Columbia, outlasting every one of their contemporaries employed in the short-film genre. Del Lord directed more than three dozen Stooge films, Jules White directed dozens more, and his brother Jack White directed several under the pseudonym "Preston Black". Silent-comedy star Charley Chase also shared directorial responsibilities with Lord and White.

The Stooge films made between 1935 and 1941 captured the team at their peak, according to film historians Ted Okuda and Edward Watz, authors of The Columbia Comedy Shorts; nearly every film produced became a classic in its own right. Hoi Polloi (1935) adapted the premise of Pygmalion, with a stuffy professor making a bet that he can transform the uncultured trio into refined gentlemen; the plotline worked so well that it was reused twice, as Half-Wits Holiday (1947) and Pies and Guys (1958). Three Little Beers (1935) featured the Stooges running amok on a golf course to win prize money. Disorder in the Court (1936) features the team as star witnesses in a murder trial. Violent Is the Word for Curly (1938) was a quality Chase-directed short that featured the musical interlude "Swingin' the Alphabet".

In A Plumbing We Will Go (1940)—one of the team's quintessential comedies—the Stooges are cast as plumbers who nearly destroy a socialite's mansion, causing water to exit every appliance in the home, including an early television set. This was remade twice, as Vagabond Loafers and Scheming Schemers. Other entries of the era are considered among the team's finest work, including Uncivil Warriors (1935), A Pain in the Pullman and False Alarms (both 1936), Grips, Grunts and Groans, The Sitter Downers, Dizzy Doctors (all 1937), Tassels in the Air (1938), We Want Our Mummy (1939), Nutty but Nice (1940), and An Ache in Every Stake and In the Sweet Pie and Pie (both 1941).

With the onset of World War II, the Stooges released several entries that poked fun at the rising Axis powers. You Nazty Spy! (1940) and its sequel I'll Never Heil Again (1941) lampooned Hitler and the Nazis at a time when America was still neutral. Moe was cast as "Moe Hailstone", an Adolf Hitler-like character, with Curly playing a Hermann Göring character, replete with medals, and Larry a Joseph Goebbels-type propaganda minister. Moe, Larry, and director Jules White considered You Nazty Spy! their best film. Yet, these efforts indulged in a deliberately formless, non-sequitur style of verbal humor that was not the Stooges' forte, according to Okuda and Watz.

Other wartime entries have their moments, such as They Stooge to Conga (considered the most violent Stooge short), Higher Than a Kite, Back from the Front (all 1943), Gents Without Cents (1944) and the anti-Japanese The Yoke's on Me (also 1944). However, taken in bulk, the wartime films are considered less funny than what preceded them. No Dough Boys (1944) is often considered the best of these farces. The team, made up as Japanese soldiers for a photo shoot, is mistaken for genuine saboteurs by a Nazi ringleader (Vernon Dent, the Stooges' primary foil). The highlight of the film features the Stooges engaging in nonsensical gymnastics for a skeptical group of enemy agents expecting renowned acrobats.

Wartime also brought on rising production costs that resulted in fewer elaborate gags and outdoor sequences, Del Lord's stock in trade; as a result, the quality of the team's films, particularly those directed by Lord, began to slip after 1942. According to Okuda and Watz, entries such as Loco Boy Makes Good, What's the Matador?, Sock-a-Bye Baby (all 1942), I Can Hardly Wait and A Gem of a Jam (both 1943) are considered to be lesser-quality works than previous films. Spook Louder (1943), a remake of Mack Sennett's The Great Pie Mystery (1931), is sometimes considered one of their weakest shorts because of its repetitious and rehashed jokes. Three Smart Saps (1942), was an improvement, reworking a routine from Harold Lloyd's The Freshman (1925), in which Curly's loosely stitched suit begins to fall apart at the seams while he is on the dance floor.

The Stooges made occasional supporting appearances in feature films. Most of the Stooges' peers had either made the transition from shorts to feature films (Laurel and Hardy, The Ritz Brothers) or starred in their own feature films from the onset (Marx Brothers, Abbott and Costello). However, Moe believed that the team's slapstick style worked better in short form. In 1935, Columbia proposed to star them in their own full-length feature, but Moe rejected the idea, saying, "It's a hard job inventing, rewriting, or stealing gags for our two-reel comedies for Columbia Pictures without having to make a seven-reeler (feature film). We can make short films out of material needed for a starring feature, and then we wouldn't know whether it would be funny enough to click."

Film critics have cited Curly as the most popular member of the team. His childlike mannerisms, natural comedic charm, and uncouth, juvenile humor made him a hit with audiences, particularly women and children. However, Curly having to shave his head for the act led him to feel unappealing to women. To mask his insecurities, he ate and drank to excess and caroused whenever the Stooges made personal appearances, which was around seven months of each year. His weight ballooned in the 1940s, and his blood pressure became dangerously high. Curly's wild lifestyle and constant drinking eventually caught up with him in 1945, and his performances suffered.

During a five-month hiatus from August 1945 through January 1946, the trio committed themselves to making a feature film at Monogram, followed by two months of live appearances in New York City, with performances seven days a week. Curly also entered a disastrous third marriage in October 1945, leading to a separation in January 1946 and divorce in July 1946, at great cost to his already fragile health. Upon the Stooges' return to Los Angeles in late November 1945, Curly was a shell of his former self. They had two months to rest before reporting back to Columbia in late January 1946, but Curly's condition was irreversible. They had only 24 days of work over the next three months, but eight weeks of time off could not help the situation. In those last six shorts, ranging from Monkey Businessmen (1946) through Half-Wits Holiday (1947), Curly was seriously ill, struggling to get through even the most basic scenes.

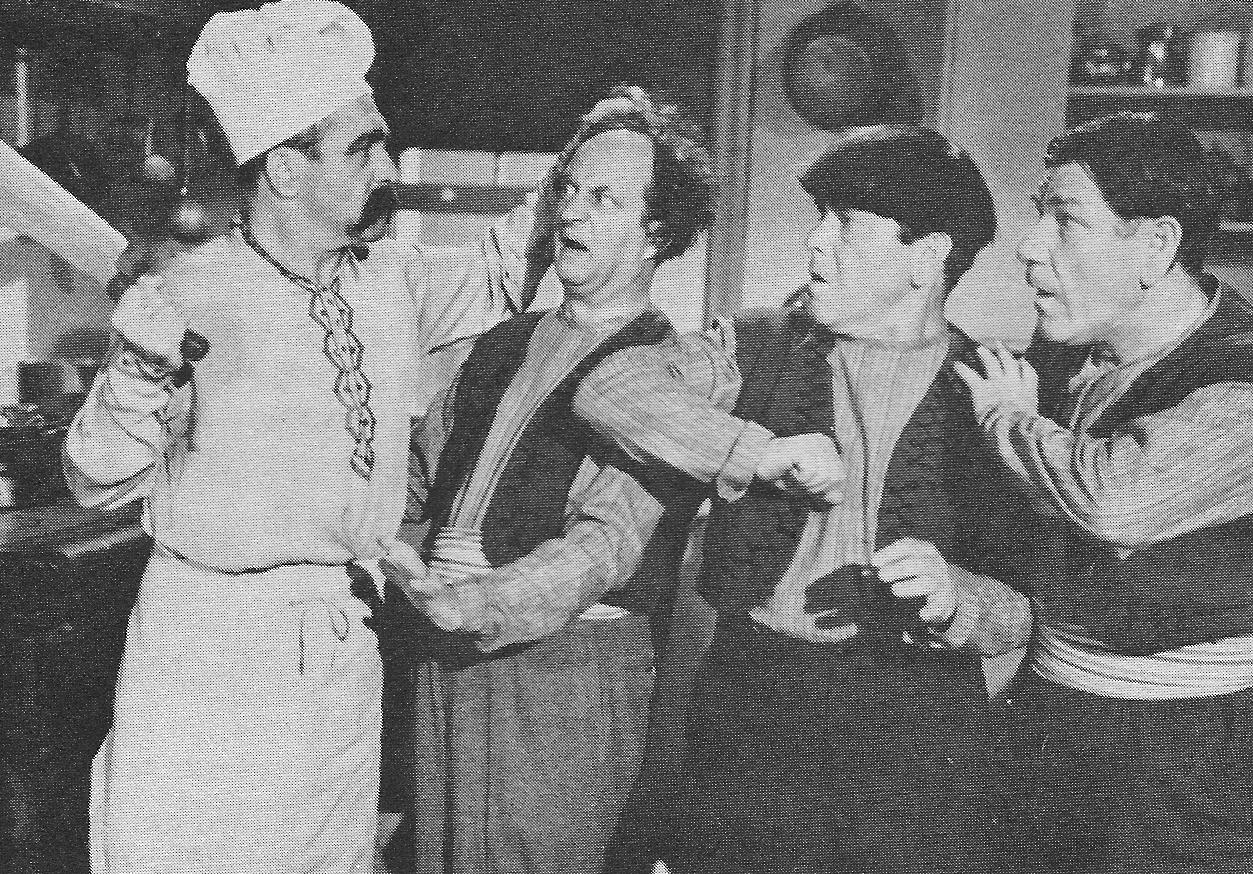
A thinner Curly (with a full head of hair and false handlebar mustache) as the cook in Malice in the Palace (1949) with Larry, Moe and Shemp: Curly's scene was deleted from the final release.

During the final day of filming Half-Wits Holiday (1947) on May 6, 1946, Curly suffered a debilitating stroke on the set, ending his 14-year career. They hoped for a full recovery, but Curly never appeared in a film again except for a single cameo appearance in the third film after Shemp returned to the trio, Hold That Lion! (1947). It was the only film that contained all four of the original Stooges (the three Howard brothers and Larry) on screen simultaneously. According to Jules White, this came about when Curly visited the set one day, and White had him do this bit for fun. Curly's cameo appearance was recycled in the remake Booty and the Beast, released in 1953.

In 1949, Curly filmed a brief scene for Malice in the Palace (1949) as the restaurant's cook, but it was not used. Jules White's copy of the script contained the dialogue for this missing scene, and a production still of Curly does exist, appearing on both the film's original one-sheet and lobby card. Larry played the role of the cook in the final print.

==== Shemp's return (1946–1955) ====
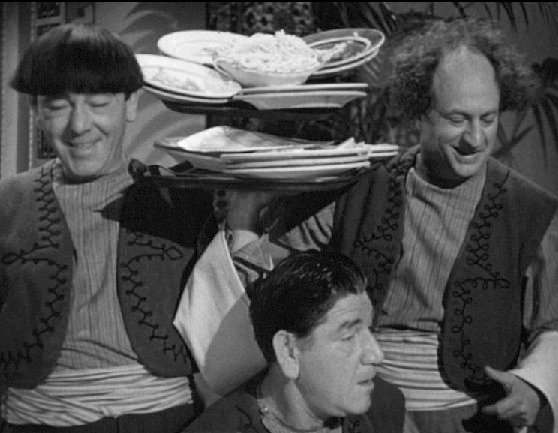
Moe and Larry with Shemp (center) from Malice in the Palace (1949)

Moe asked his older brother Shemp to take Curly's place, but Shemp was hesitant to rejoin the Stooges, as he was enjoying a successful solo career. He realized, however, that not rejoining the Stooges would mean the end of Moe and Larry's film careers. Shemp wanted assurances that rejoining them would be only temporary and that he could leave the Stooges once Curly recovered. However, Curly's health continued to deteriorate, and it became clear that he could not return. As a result, Shemp resumed being a Stooge full-time for nearly a decade. Curly remained ill until his death of a cerebral hemorrhage from additional strokes on January 18, 1952.

Shemp appeared with the Stooges in 76 shorts and a low-budget Western comedy feature titled Gold Raiders (1951) in which the screen time was evenly divided with cowboy hero George O'Brien. Shemp's return improved the quality of the films, as the previous few had been marred by Curly's sluggish performances. Entries such as Out West (1947), Squareheads of the Round Table (1948), and Punchy Cowpunchers (1950) proved that Shemp could hold his own. New director Edward Bernds, who joined the team in 1945 when Curly was failing, sensed that routines and plotlines that worked well with Curly as the comic focus did not fit Shemp's persona, and allowed the comedian to develop his own Stooge character. Jules White, however, persisted in employing the "living cartoon" style of comedy that reigned during the Curly era, forcing either Shemp or Moe to perform lackluster imitations of gags and mannerisms that originated from Curly. Most acutely, it created the "Curly vs. Shemp" debate that overshadowed the act upon Curly's departure. The Stooges lost some of their charm and inherent appeal to children after Curly retired—Curly, Larry, and Moe behaved like three cartoon characters, while Shemp, Larry, and Moe behaved like three vaudevillians—but some excellent films were produced with Shemp, an accomplished solo comedian who often performed best when allowed to improvise on his own.

The films from the Shemp era contrast sharply with those from the Curly era, largely owing to the individual directing styles of Edward Bernds and Jules White. From 1947 to 1952, Bernds hit a string of successes, including Fright Night (1947), The Hot Scots, Mummy's Dummies, Crime on Their Hands (all 1948), Three Arabian Nuts (1951), and Gents in a Jam (1952). Three of the team's finest efforts were directed by Bernds: Brideless Groom (1947), Who Done It? (1949), and Punchy Cowpunchers (Bernds's own favorite, 1950). White also contributed a few fair entries, such as Hold That Lion! (1947), Hokus Pokus (1949), Scrambled Brains (1951), A Missed Fortune, and Corny Casanovas (both 1952).

Another benefit from the Shemp era was that Larry was given more time on screen. Throughout most of the Curly era, Larry was relegated to a background role, but by the time that Shemp rejoined the Stooges, Larry was allotted equal time, even becoming the focus of several films, in particular Fuelin' Around (1949) and He Cooked His Goose (1952).

The Stooge shorts were always welcome in theaters—more specifically, those theaters that still found room for two-reel comedies in their programs. Many exhibitors singled out these slapstick comedies as their most popular short-subject attraction. In annual surveys of theater owners, the Stooge two-reelers generally placed among the top five live-action shorts series, behind the Pete Smith Specialties and the March of Time and This Is America documentaries. The Stooge series might well have placed even higher, as the trade journal Showmen's Trade Review commented in 1948: "The Three Stooges series fails to appear higher than it does simply because the double-feature policy precludes the wide exhibition this series might otherwise get. Perhaps the greatest tribute to the Stooges comedies is the fact that they have appeared among the Leading Short Subjects for 10 years. Some may come, some may go, but the Three Stooges seem to go on forever making people laugh and forget their troubles."

The Three Stooges made their first appearance on television (in person, not their old films) in 1948. They were guest stars on Milton Berle's popular Texaco Star Theater and Morey Amsterdam's The Morey Amsterdam Show. By 1949, the team filmed a pilot for ABC-TV for their own weekly television series, titled Jerks of All Trades. Columbia Pictures blocked the series from going into production, but allowed the Stooges to make television guest appearances. The team went on to appear on Camel Comedy Caravan (also known as The Ed Wynn Show), The Kate Smith Hour, The Colgate Comedy Hour, The Frank Sinatra Show, and The Eddie Cantor Comedy Theatre, among others.

In 1952, the Stooges lost some key players at Columbia Pictures. The studio decided to downsize its short-subject division, resulting in producer Hugh McCollum being discharged and director Edward Bernds resigning out of loyalty to McCollum, and having had creative differences with Jules White. Screenwriter Elwood Ullman, who had worked closely with Bernds, also resigned. Bernds's departure left only White to direct the Stooges' remaining Columbia comedies. Not long after, the quality of the team's output markedly declined, with producer-director White then assuming complete control over production. DVD Talk critic Stuart Galbraith IV commented that "the Stooges' shorts became increasingly mechanical...and frequently substituted violent sight gags for story and characterization." Production was also significantly faster, with the former four-day filming schedules then tightened to two or three days. In another cost-cutting measure, White created a "new" Stooge short by borrowing footage from old ones, setting it in a slightly different storyline and filming a few new scenes, often with the same actors in the same costumes. White was initially very subtle when recycling older footage; he would reuse only a single sequence of old film, re-edited so cleverly that it was not easy to detect. The later shorts were cheaper and the recycling more obvious, with as much as 75% of the running time consisting of old footage. White came to rely so much on older material that he could film the "new" shorts in a single day. New footage filmed to link older material suffered from White's heavy-handed directing style and penchant for telling his actors how to act. Shemp, in particular, disliked working with White after 1952, when White was the Stooges' only director.

In 1956, after other studios had abandoned short-subject production, Jules White and Columbia had the field to themselves. However, by this time most theaters and drive-ins were using a double-feature or even triple-feature policy, leaving no room for two-reel comedies. White acknowledged the trend by winding down his activities. He made only 14 new comedies for the 1955–56 season: eight with the Three Stooges, two with Andy Clyde, two with Wally Vernon and Eddie Quillan, and two with Joe Besser, all low-budget remakes of older comedies. White explained to historian David Bruskin, "I saw what was happening around me and realized what we were doing was repeating ourselves and, for the most part, using big chunks of previous films." White planned to shut down the entire department after the 1956 quota had been completed.

Hastening White's decision was the sudden death of Shemp Howard. On November 22, 1955, Shemp went out with friends to a boxing match at the Hollywood Legion Stadium. While returning home in a taxi that evening, Shemp died of a massive cerebral hemorrhage (as confirmed by Shemp's daughter-in-law; not a heart attack, as has been reported) at the age of 60. Moe was stunned and contemplated disbanding the Stooges, but Columbia had promised exhibitors eight Stooge shorts for the year and only four had been completed, forcing producer Jules White to manufacture four more shorts "with Shemp". Old footage of Shemp was combined with new footage of Columbia supporting player Joe Palma doubling for him (see Fake Shemp). These last four films were Rumpus in the Harem, Hot Stuff, Scheming Schemers, and Commotion on the Ocean (all released in 1956).

White saw little point in carrying the series any further. The Stooges and Andy Clyde had been with White since 1934, but White saw the writing on the wall. "I used to get the sales news on how the films were doing. I was watching this and so was Columbia. It was time to go to the office and say, 'Look, fellows, we've done well up to here. Why don't we leave them laughing?'" White canceled all of his comedy-shorts series in 1956, but Harry Cohn insisted on keeping the Stooge comedies coming. In his own way, Cohn was sentimental about the team; Larry Fine recalled that Cohn once told the Stooges, "As long as I'm president, you've got a job at Columbia."

Moe Howard and Larry Fine had been carrying the short-subject series as a two-man team, with Shemp Howard seen entirely in older footage. Larry suggested that he and Moe could continue working as "The Two Stooges." Columbia flatly refused, having promoted the team as "The Three Stooges" for decades, and Moe was forced to recruit a third Stooge. Several comedians were considered, including burlesque comic and former Ted Healy stooge Paul "Mousie" Garner, and noted African-American comedian Mantan Moreland, but Columbia insisted on a comedian already under contract to the studio. They agreed on Joe Besser.

==== Joe Besser replaces Shemp (1956–1958) ====
Joe Besser appeared in the final 16 Stooge shorts. He had been starring in his own short-subject comedies for the studio since 1949 and appeared in supporting roles in feature films. Despite Besser's prolific film and stage career, the Stooge entries featuring him have often been considered the team's weakest. Besser was a talented comic, and was quite popular as "Stinky" on The Abbott and Costello Show, but his whining mannerisms and resistance to slapstick punishment did not fit the Stooges' established format of continuous physical comedy. His presence, though, did create verbal friction between Moe and Larry, improving their mutually insulting banter.

Besser had observed how one side of Larry Fine's face appeared "calloused", so he had a clause in his contract specifically prohibiting him from being hit beyond an infrequent tap, though this restriction was later lifted. "I usually played the kind of character who would hit others back," Besser recalled.

The Besser Stooge shorts were of inconsistent quality, alternating between fresh, original material and tired rehashes. Fully half of these shorts contained all-new scripts, experimenting with science-fiction, fantasy, and musical-comedy formats. The other eight scripts were remakes, based on earlier Stooge comedies. Budgets were lower than ever, and Moe and Larry's advanced ages prohibited them from performing much of their trademark physical comedy. Besser had suggested that Moe and Larry comb their hair back to give them a more gentlemanly appearance; while both Moe and Jules White approved of the idea, they used it sparingly. Their other films—remakes of older comedies—required the familiar Stooge haircuts to match the older footage.

In general, the remakes among the Besser shorts had the traditional Stooges knockabout, such as 1958's Pies and Guys (a scene-for-scene remake of Half-Wits Holiday, which itself was a reworking of the earlier Hoi Polloi), Guns a Poppin (1957), Rusty Romeos (1957), and Triple Crossed (1959). In contrast, Hoofs and Goofs and Horsing Around, both featuring a trained horse, and Muscle Up a Little Closer (all 1957) mostly resembled the sitcoms of the era. A Merry Mix Up (1957) cast the Stooges as three sets of triplets, and Oil's Well That Ends Well (1958) had no supporting cast at all, with the Stooges working entirely by themselves for the only time in their Columbia career. The musical Sweet and Hot (1958) deserves some credit for straying from the norm. The American science-fiction craze also led to three entries focusing on space travel: Space Ship Sappy, Outer Space Jitters (both 1957), and Flying Saucer Daffy (1958).

Jules White finally closed the comedy-shorts unit on December 20, 1957. His final Stooge comedy was Flying Saucer Daffy, filmed December 19–20, 1957. By the year's end, the Three Stooges were fired from Columbia Pictures after 24 years of employment.

No formal goodbyes or congratulatory celebrations occurred in recognition of their work and of the money that their comedies had earned for the studio. Moe visited Columbia several weeks after the dismissal to say goodbye to several executives, but was refused entry without the current year's studio pass. He later stated that it was a crushing blow to his pride.

The studio had enough completed Stooge films to be released over the next 18 months, though not in the order in which they were produced. The final Stooge release, Sappy Bull Fighters, did not reach theaters until June 4, 1959. With no active contract in place, Moe and Larry discussed plans for a personal-appearance tour. In the meantime, Besser's wife suffered a minor heart attack and he preferred to stay local, leading him to withdraw from the act.

=== Renewed popularity with Joe DeRita (1958–1970) ===
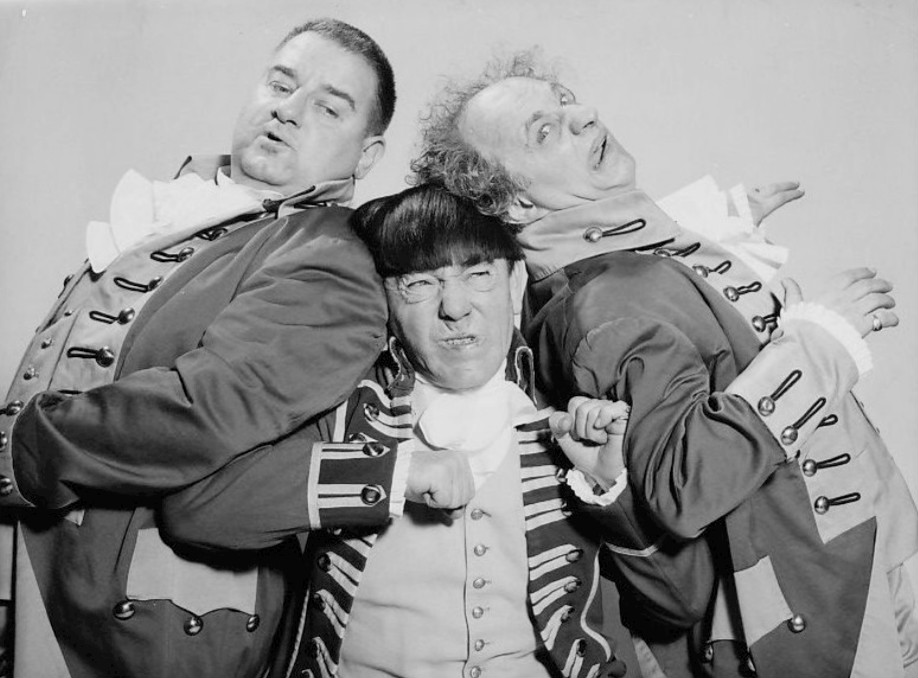
Larry, Moe, and Curly Joe: The Stooges with Curly Joe DeRita (left) in 1959

After Besser's departure, Moe and Larry began looking for potential replacements. Larry suggested former Ted Healy stooge Paul "Mousie" Garner, but based on his tryout performance, Moe later remarked that he was "completely unacceptable." Weeks later, Larry came across burlesque performer Joe DeRita, who had starred in his own series of shorts at Columbia back in the 1940s, and thought he would be a good fit.

The early days of television provided movie studios a place to unload a backlog of short films that they thought no longer marketable, and the Stooge films seemed perfect for the burgeoning genre. ABC had even expressed interest as far back as 1949, purchasing exclusive rights to 30 of the trio's shorts and commissioning a pilot for a potential series, Jerks of All Trades. However, the success of television revivals for such names as Laurel and Hardy, Woody Woodpecker, Popeye, Tom and Jerry, and the Our Gang series in the late 1950s led Columbia to cash in again on the Stooges. In September 1958, Columbia's television subsidiary Screen Gems offered a package consisting of 78 Stooge shorts (primarily from the Curly era), which were well received.

An additional 40 shorts hit the market in April 1959. By September 1959, all 190 Stooge shorts were airing regularly. With so many films available for broadcast, daily television airings provided heavy exposure aimed squarely at children. Parents who had grown up seeing the same films in the theaters began to watch alongside their children.

After the Curly-era shorts were found to be the most popular, Moe suggested that DeRita shave his head to accentuate his slight resemblance to Curly Howard. He adopted first a crew cut and later a completely shaven head, thus becoming "Curly Joe". Howard, Fine, and DeRita found themselves in great demand for personal appearances and guest shots on television. DeRita made his first nationwide appearance with the Stooges on Sunday, January 11, 1959, on the Steve Allen variety show on NBC; the Stooges re-created their "Stand-In" sketch, with Moe and Larry making a western movie and Curly Joe (who did not speak) as the hapless double who takes all the punishment.

Columbia, which was still releasing Stooge shorts to theaters, cashed in on the Stooges' spectacular show-business comeback by signing the team for new feature-length films. The first, Have Rocket, Will Travel (1959), was produced by the Stooges' agent, Harry Romm. The second got off the ground when Columbia's New York office asked Jules White to prepare a new Three Stooges feature film for theaters. The result was Stop! Look! and Laugh!, released in 1960. "The Original Three Stooges" were seen entirely in old short-subject extracts with Curly Howard, and new footage was filmed with ventriloquist Paul Winchell and animal act The Marquis Chimps. White shrugged it off as a quickie patchwork: "I got a free trip to New York out of it. Stop! Look! and Laugh! took an awful lot of know-how and care to put together. I worked on the thing for over a month. We used to run four or five Stooges films in the evening at my house for I don't know how many months."

The Stooges were hired by Twentieth Century-Fox to co-star in a Technicolor feature with Olympic skater Carol Heiss; Snow White and the Three Stooges (1961), co-written by Noel Langley of The Wizard of Oz, fell short of box office expectations, ultimately losing $2,300,000 when the domestic and international returns were tallied. The Stooges resumed making their new kiddie-matinée features, which were then produced independently by Moe's son-in-law Norman Maurer and released through Columbia: The Three Stooges Meet Hercules (1962), The Three Stooges in Orbit (1962), The Three Stooges Go Around the World in a Daze (1963), and The Outlaws is Coming! (1965).

The team had an extremely brief cameo in the film It's a Mad, Mad, Mad, Mad World (1963), appearing as firemen. They appeared in a larger capacity in 1963 in 4 for Texas starring Frank Sinatra and Dean Martin. Throughout the early 1960s, the Stooges were one of the most popular and highest-paid live acts in America. They played theaters, summer festivals, fairgrounds, and other venues, and twice performed as the featured act at the Canadian National Exhibition. In 1968, they toured Hawaii where they starred in the International 3-Ring Circus at the Honolulu International Center.

The Stooges also tried their hand at another weekly television series in 1960 titled The Three Stooges Scrapbook, filmed in color and with a laugh track. The first episode, "Home Cooking", featured the boys rehearsing for a new television show. Like Jerks of All Trades in 1949, the pilot did not sell, though Norman Maurer was able to reuse the footage (reprocessed in black and white) for the first 10 minutes of The Three Stooges in Orbit.

The trio also filmed 41 short comedy skits for The New 3 Stooges in 1965, which features a series of 156 animated cartoons produced for television. The Stooges appeared in live-action color footage, which preceded and followed each animated adventure in which they voiced their respective characters.

During this period, the Stooges appeared on numerous television shows, including The Steve Allen Show, Here's Hollywood, Masquerade Party, The Ed Sullivan Show, Danny Thomas Meets the Comics, The Joey Bishop Show, Off to See the Wizard, and Truth or Consequences.

=== Final years (1970–1975) ===
In late 1969, Howard, Fine, and DeRita began production on another half-hour pilot, this time for a syndicated 39-episode TV series titled Kook's Tour, a combination travelogue-sitcom that had the "retired" Stooges traveling to various parts of the world with the episodes filmed on location. On January 9, 1970, during production of the pilot, Larry suffered a paralyzing stroke, ending his acting career along with plans for the television series. The pilot was unfinished and several key shots were missing, but producer Norman Maurer edited the available footage and made the pilot a 52-minute special that was released to the home-movie and Cartrivision videocassette home-video markets in 1973. It is the last film in which the Stooges appeared and the last known performance of the team.

Following Larry Fine's stroke, plans were made for Emil Sitka (a longtime "straight man" in the Stooges films) to replace him in a new feature film, written by Moe Howard's grandson, Jeffrey Scott [Maurer], titled Make Love, Not War. Moe Howard, Joe DeRita, and Emil Sitka were cast as POWs in a World War II Japanese prison camp, plotting an escape with fellow prisoners. The film would have been a departure from typical Stooge fare, with dark-edged humor and scenes of war violence, but insufficient funding prevented production from advancing beyond the script stage.

Also in 1970, Joe DeRita recruited vaudeville veterans Frank Mitchell and Mousie Garner to tour as The New Three Stooges. Garner had worked with Ted Healy as one of his "replacement stooges" decades earlier and was briefly considered as Joe Besser's replacement in 1958. Mitchell had appeared in two of the Stooges' short subjects in 1953, and had been part of the knockabout team of Mitchell and Durant. The act fared poorly, with minimal bookings. In 1973, DeRita performed as the comic in a burlesque revival show in Las Vegas. By this time, Moe's wife had prevailed on him to retire from performing slapstick due to his age. For the next several years, Moe appeared regularly on talk shows and did speaking engagements at colleges and universities, while DeRita quietly retired.

Larry suffered another stroke in mid-December 1974, and another one in January 1975, even more severe. After slipping into a coma, he died a week later from a cerebral hemorrhage on January 24, 1975.

Shortly after Larry's death, the Stooges were scheduled to co-star in the R-rated comedy Blazing Stewardesses, featuring Moe and Curly Joe with Emil Sitka in the middle spot as Harry, Larry's brother. The team was signed and publicity shots were taken, but one week prior to March's filming date, Moe was diagnosed with lung cancer and the Stooges had to back out; he died on May 4, 1975. Producer Sam Sherman briefly considered having former Stooge Joe Besser appear in his place, but ultimately decided against it. Another veteran comedy team, The Ritz Brothers, Harry and Jimmy, replaced the Stooges and performed much of their own schtick, including the precision dance routine first seen in Sing, Baby, Sing (1936), co-starring original Stooge leader Ted Healy.

As for the remaining original replacement stooges, Joe Besser died of heart failure on March 1, 1988, followed by Joe DeRita's death of pneumonia on July 3, 1993. Emil Sitka was announced as a Stooge, but never performed as such beyond posing for a few publicity photographs in character; he died on January 16, 1998, six months after being disabled by a stroke. As for the new three stooges, Frank Mitchell died of cardiac arrest on January 24, 1991, followed by Mousie Garner's death of a heart attack on August 8, 2004.

== Legacy and perspective ==
Over 60 years since their last short film was released, the Three Stooges remain popular. Their films have never left American television since first appearing in 1958. Authors Ted Okuda and Edward Watz assess the Stooges as hard-working comedians who were never critics' favorites, a durable act that endured several personnel changes in careers that would have permanently sidelined a less persistent act. They would not have lasted as long as they did as a unit without Moe Howard's guiding hand.

Okuda and Watz's book The Columbia Comedy Shorts puts the Stooges' act in critical perspective:

Many scholarly studies of motion-picture comedy have overlooked the Three Stooges entirely – and not without valid reasoning. Aesthetically, the Stooges violated every rule that constitutes "good" comedic style. Their characters lacked the emotional depth of Charlie Chaplin and Harry Langdon; they were never as witty or subtle as Buster Keaton. They were not disciplined enough to sustain lengthy comic sequences; far too often, they were willing to suspend what little narrative structure their pictures possessed in order to insert a number of gratuitous jokes. Nearly every premise they have employed (spoofs of Westerns, horror films, costume melodramas) has been done to better effect by other comedians. And yet, in spite of the overwhelming artistic odds against them, they were responsible for some of the finest comedies ever made. Their humor was the most undistilled form of low comedy; they were not great innovators, but as quick-laugh practitioners, they place second to none. If public taste is any criterion, the Stooges have been the reigning kings of comedy for over 50 years.

Beginning in the 1980s, the Stooges finally began to receive critical recognition. The release of nearly all their films on DVD by 2010 allowed critics of Joe Besser and Joe DeRita—often the recipients of significant fan backlash—to appreciate both men's unique styles of comedy. The DVD market has also allowed fans to view the entire Stooge film corpus as distinct periods in their long career, rather than unfairly comparing one Stooge to another (the Curly vs. Shemp debate continues to this day, with Joe Besser not even mentioned in the same breath).

The team appeared in 220 films, but authors Okuda and Watz agree that their series of 190 two-reel comedies for Columbia is their enduring legacy. In 1984, American television personality Steve Allen said, "Although they never achieved widespread critical acclaim, they did succeed in accomplishing what they had always intended to do: They made people laugh."

== Social commentary, satire, and use of language ==
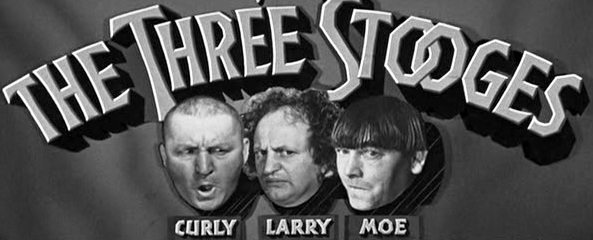
The Stooges in 1936

Although the Three Stooges' slapstick comedy was primarily arranged around basic plots dealing with mundane issues of daily life, a number of their shorts featured social commentary or satire. They were often antiheroical commentators on class divisions and economic hardships of the Great Depression in the United States. They were usually under- or unemployed and sometimes homeless or living in shanty towns.

The language used by the Three Stooges was more slang-laden than that of typical feature films of the period and deliberately affected a lower-class status with use of crude terms, ethnic mannerisms, and inside jokes.

An example is the use of the initials A.K. for big shots and pretentious people. A.K. was an inside joke which stood for Alte Kocker (an elderly person who is defecating), a Yiddish idiom that means an old man or woman of diminished capacity who can no longer do things they used to do.

Much of the seeming "gibberish" that the Stooges sometimes spoke was actually the Yiddish language of their Jewish ancestry. The most famous example occurs 15 minutes into the 1938 short Mutts to You. Moe and Larry were impersonating Chinese laundrymen in an attempt to fool the local cop. While being questioned, Larry says "Ech bin a China Boychic from Slobatkya-Gebernya hak mir nisht Ken Tshaynik and I don't mean Efsher". This translates as "I'm a China boy from Slobatkya Gebernya [a made-up area in eastern Russia], so stop annoying me and I don't mean maybe."

A third "in-Yiddish" joke is in the episode Pardon My Scotch, when the liquor supplier prepares to consume the Stooges' volatile concoction, and they wish him well in a triad pattern saying "Over the river," "Skip the gutter," and concluding with "Ver geharget," a Yiddish expression meaning "get killed" or "drop dead".

One important area of political commentary was in the area of the rise of totalitarianism in Europe, notably in the directly satirical You Nazty Spy! and I'll Never Heil Again, both released before United States' entry into World War II, despite an industry Production Code that advocated avoiding social and political issues and the negative portrayal of foreign countries.

== Lineups on film ==
Years	Moe	Larry	Shemp	Curly	Joe	Curly Joe
1930–1932	✓	✓	✓			
1932–1946	✓	✓		✓		
1946–1955	✓	✓	✓			
1956–1958	✓	✓			✓	
1958–1970	✓	✓				✓

== Filmography ==
The Three Stooges appeared in 220 films through their career. Of those, 190 short films were made for Columbia Pictures, for which the trio are best known today. Their first Columbia film, Woman Haters, premiered on May 5, 1934. Their contract was extended each year until the final one expired on December 31, 1957. Columbia continued to release the Stooge shorts filmed in 1957 until the final release, Sappy Bull Fighters, premiered on June 4, 1959, with reissues being released theatrically on a regular basis afterwards at least until the late 1980s.

Three feature-length Columbia releases were actually packages of older Columbia shorts. Columbia Laff Hour (introduced in 1956) was a random assortment that included the Stooges among other Columbia comedians like Andy Clyde, Hugh Herbert, and Vera Vague; the content and length varied from one theater to the next. Three Stooges Fun-O-Rama (introduced in 1959) was an all-Stooges show capitalizing on their TV fame, again with shorts chosen at random for individual theaters. The Three Stooges Follies (1974) was similar to Laff Hour, with a trio of Stooge comedies augmented by Buster Keaton and Vera Vague shorts, a Batman serial chapter, and a Kate Smith musical.

== C3 Entertainment, Inc. ==
In 1959, Comedy III Productions (later, C3 Entertainment) was formed by Moe, Larry, and Joe DeRita to manage all business and merchandise transactions. Then controlled by DeRita's heirs, it has diversified into a brand-management company licensing personality rights to various nostalgia acts, including the Stooges.

== Television ==
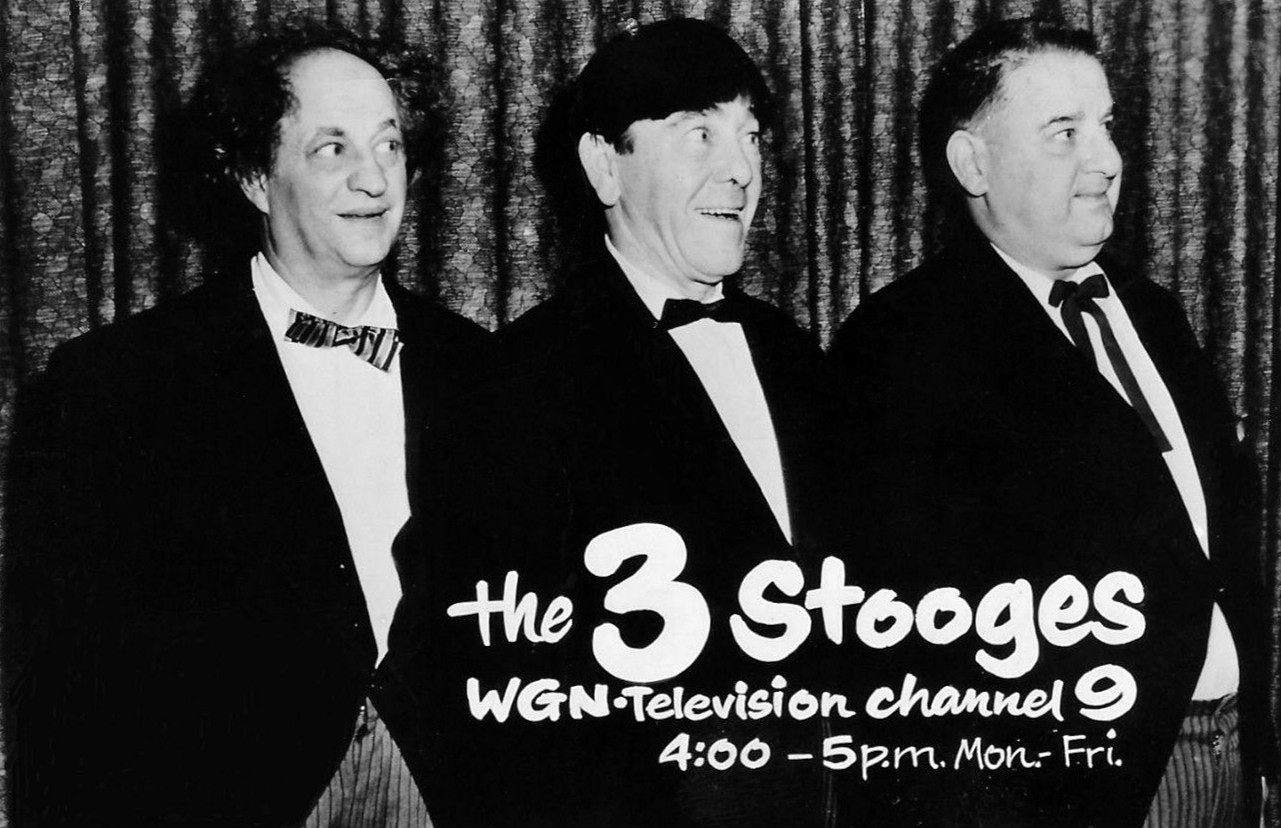
Larry, Moe, and Curly Joe appeared in a 1962 TV ad promoting their earlier short subjects, though DeRita never appeared in any.

A handful of Three Stooges shorts first aired on television in 1949, on the ABC network. By 1958, Screen Gems packaged 78 shorts for national syndication; the package was gradually enlarged to encompass the entire library of 190 shorts. In 1959, KTTV in Los Angeles purchased the Three Stooges films for air, but by the early 1970s, rival station KTLA began airing the Stooges films, keeping them in the schedule until early 1994. The Family Channel ran the shorts as part of their Stooge TV block from February 19, 1996, to January 2, 1998. In the late 1990s, AMC had held the rights to the Three Stooges shorts, originally airing them under a programming block called "Stooges Playhouse". In 1999, it was replaced with a program called N.Y.UK (New Yuk University of Knuckleheads), which starred actor/comedian Leslie Nielsen. The program would show three random Stooge shorts. Nielsen hosts the program as a college instructor, known as the Professor of Stoogelogy, who teaches to the students lectures on the Three Stooges before the Stooges' shorts air. The block aired several shorts often grouped by a theme, such as similar schtick used in different films. Although the block was discontinued after AMC revamped their format in 2002, the network still ran Stooges shorts occasionally. The AMC run ended when Spike TV (today the Paramount Network) picked them up in 2004, airing them in their Stooges Slap-Happy Hour every Saturday and Sunday mornings. On June 6, 2005, the network began running the Stooges Slap-Happy as a one-hour summer comedy block, which ended on September 2, 2005. By 2007, the network had discontinued the block. Although Spike did air Stooges shorts for a brief time after the block was canceled, as of late April 2008, the Stooges had disappeared from the network's schedule entirely. The Three Stooges returned on December 31, 2009, on AMC, starting with the "Countdown with the Stooges" New Year's Eve marathon. AMC planned to put several episodes on their website in 2010. As of 2009 AMC still airs The Three Stooges every weekday midnights and mornings. Also as of 2022 AMC's other sister channel BBC America also airs The Three Stooges on midnights each weekday. The "Stooges" shorts were best known in Chicago as a part of a half-hour, late-afternoon show on WGN-TV hosted by Bob Bell as "Andy Starr" in the 1960s. In the 1990s, Stooges films were aired as part of The Koz Zone movie segment on Chicago television.

Since the 2000s, Columbia and its television division's successor, Sony Pictures Television, has preferred to license the Stooges shorts to cable networks, which left the films off local broadcast TV for several years until they were licensed to nationally broadcast classic TV networks. The last time the Stooges were offered in traditional broadcast syndication was in 1999, when Columbia TriStar Television Distribution put together a new package of 130 half-hour episodes compiling the shorts into themed installments, with new interstitial material created by Evolution Media and voiced by Jeff Bennett (in a similar fashion to the Screen Gems Network, a syndicated block of classic television series also offered around the same time by CTTD with Evolution's involvement).

Two stations in Chicago and Boston, however, signed long-term syndication contracts with Columbia years ago and had declined to terminate them. WMEU-CD in Chicago aired all 190 Three Stooges shorts on Saturday afternoons and Sunday evenings until 2014. WSBK-TV in Boston aired Stooges shorts and feature films, including an annual New Year's Eve marathon until their contract expired in September 2022; WSBK wanted to renew the contract, but Sony was unwilling to do so. KTLA in Los Angeles dropped the shorts in 1994, but brought them back in 2007 as part of a special retro-marathon commemorating the station's 60th anniversary. Since that time, the station's original 16 mm Stooges film prints have aired occasionally as part of minimarathons on holidays. Antenna TV, a network broadcasting on the digital subchannels of local broadcast stations (owned by Tribune Broadcasting, which also owns KTLA), began airing the Stooges shorts upon the network's January 1, 2011, launch, which ran in multi-hour blocks on weekends through December 29, 2012; most of the Three Stooges feature films are also broadcast on the network, through Antenna TV's distribution agreement with Sony Pictures Entertainment (whose Columbia Pictures subsidiary released most of the films). While the network stopped airing Stooges shorts regularly from 2013 to 2015, they were occasionally shown as filler if a movie ran short, as well as in holiday marathons. The shorts returned to Antenna TV's regular lineup on January 10, 2015. In 2019, the Three Stooges were picked up by MeTV as part of their lineup.

Columbia's library of 190 Stooge shorts has been modified for television distribution. Sony no longer offers the shorts on motion-picture film, and today includes only 100 titles in the television package. All 190 shorts, however, have been released to home video.

Some films have been colorized by two separate companies. The first colorized DVD releases, distributed by Sony Pictures Home Entertainment, were prepared by West Wing Studios in 2004, using actual costumes and props for reference. The following year, Legend Films colorized the public-domain shorts Malice in the Palace, Sing a Song of Six Pants, Disorder in the Court, and Brideless Groom. Disorder in the Court and Brideless Groom also appear on two of West Wing's colorized releases. In any event, the Columbia-produced shorts (aside from the public domain films) are handled by Sony Pictures Entertainment, while the MGM Stooges shorts are owned by Warner Bros. via their Turner Entertainment division. Sony previously offered 21 of the shorts on their streaming platform Crackle, along with 11 minisodes. Meanwhile, the rights to the Stooges' feature films rest with the studios that originally produced them (Columbia/Sony for the Columbia films, and The Walt Disney Company for the Fox Film/20th Century Fox films). In January 2024, C3 Entertainment announced that it licensed all 190 Columbia shorts from Sony Pictures Television to establish a new streaming channel, the Three Stooges+ Channel, which would also offer other Three Stooges content.

AMC at one time would air what became known as mini-episodes: five-minute chunks from the Columbia shorts, broadcast with their original theatrical titles.

== Home media ==
Between 1980 and 1985, Columbia Pictures Home Entertainment and RCA/Columbia Pictures Home Video released 13 Three Stooges volumes in various formats. The original 13 volume titles were later reissued on VHS by its successor, Columbia TriStar Home Video, between 1993 and 1996, with a DVD reissue between 2000 and 2004.

=== The Three Stooges Collection ===
On October 30, 2007, Sony Pictures Home Entertainment released a two-disc DVD set titled The Three Stooges Collection, Volume One: 1934–1936. The set contains shorts from the first three years the Stooges worked at Columbia Pictures, marking the first time that all 19 shorts were released in their original theatrical order to DVD. Additionally, every short was remastered in high definition, a first for the Stooge films. Previous DVD releases were based on themes (wartime, history, work, etc.), and sold poorly.

The chronological series proved successful, and Sony wasted little time preparing the next set for release. Volume Two: 1937–1939 was released on May 27, 2008, followed by Volume Three: 1940–1942 three months later on August 26, 2008. Demand exceeded supply, proving to Sony that they had a hit on their hands. In response, Volume Four: 1943–1945 was released on October 7, 2008, a mere two months after its predecessor. Volume Four, and Volume Five: 1946–1948 was belatedly released on March 17, 2009, after delays during the Great Recession. Volume Five is the first in the series to feature Shemp Howard with the Stooges and the final volume to feature Curly Howard. Volume Six: 1949–1951 was released June 16, 2009, and Volume Seven: 1952–1954 was released on November 10, 2009. Volume Seven included 3-D glasses for the two shorts: Spooks! and Pardon My Backfire. As of 2013, the three-dimensional versions of the two shorts in this volume have been removed. Volume Eight: 1955–1959 was released on June 1, 2010. This was the final volume of the Stooges collection, bringing the series to a close. Volume Eight comprised three discs, and was the only volume to feature Joe Besser and the final volume to feature Shemp Howard. With the release of the eighth volume, for the first time in history, all 190 Three Stooges short subjects had become available to the public, uncut and unedited.

Two years later, on June 5, 2012, these discs were reissued in a DVD boxed set entitled The Three Stooges: The Ultimate Collection— today with a ninth volume (three discs) entitled Rare Treasures from the Columbia Picture Vault. This volume is not available separately, and comprises two feature films and three cartoons featuring all three Stooges, and also some of their solo work (14 shorts featuring Shemp Howard, 10 shorts featuring Joe Besser, and four shorts featuring Joe DeRita). The 2012 Ultimate Collection consists of all 8 individual original boxsets as they sold before, plus the 3 bonus discs, housed in a thin cardboard box with embossed artwork. On October 18, 2016, The Three Stooges: The Complete DVD Collection was released. It had all the DVDs from volumes 1 through 8 but it did not include the "Rare Treasures from the Columbia Picture Vault" discs. The packaging is much smaller as all 17 of the original discs are stacked on a spindle. All eight volumes are also available on iTunes. On June 15, 2020, iTunes released The Three Stooges: The Complete Series, which features all 190 shorts in an entire collection.

On July 23, 2024, 100 of the shorts were released on Blu-ray for the 100th anniversary (this boxset omits 90 shorts which are still only available on DVD at present time).

== Music ==
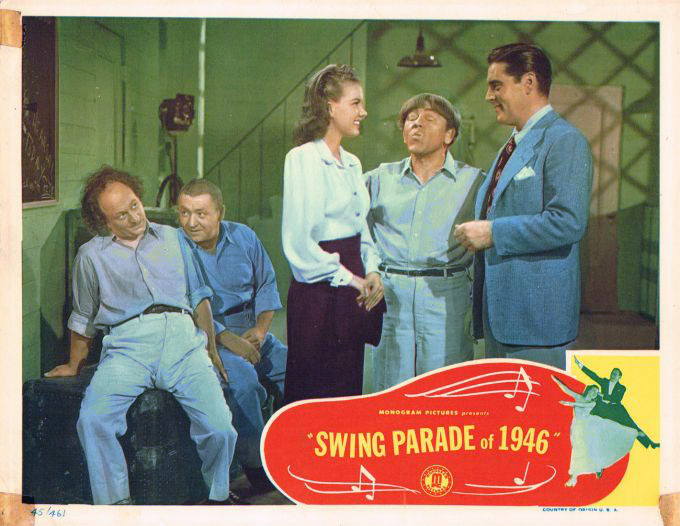
Lobby card for full-length film Swing Parade of 1946 with Gale Storm and Phil Regan

- Several instrumental tunes were played over the opening credits of the short features. The most commonly used were:
  - The verse portion of the Civil War–era song "Listen to the Mockingbird", played in a comical way, complete with sounds of birds and such. It was first used in Pardon My Scotch, their ninth short film, in 1935. (Prior to this, the opening theme varied and was typically connected to the storyline in some way.)
  - "Three Blind Mice", beginning in 1939, was a slow but straightforward presentation (dubbed the "sliding strings" version), often breaking into a "jazzy" style before ending. In mid-1942, a faster version was used, featuring accordion.
- The Columbia short Woman Haters was done completely in rhyme, mostly recited (not sung), in rhythm with a Jazz-age underscore running throughout the film, but with some key lines sung. It was sixth in a Musical Novelties short-subject series, and appropriated its musical score from the first five films. The memorable "My Life, My Love, My All", was originally "At Last!" from the film Um-Pa.
- "Swinging the Alphabet" from Violent Is the Word for Curly is perhaps the best-known song performed by the Stooges on film.
- The Stooges broke into a three-part harmonized version of "Tears" ("You'll Never Know Just What Tears Are") in Horses' Collars, A Ducking They Did Go (where the melody was sung by Bud Jamison), and Half Shot Shooters. The song, written by Moe, Larry, Shemp, and one-time Ted Healy Stooge Fred Sanborn, first appeared in the 1930 feature film Soup to Nuts.
- The "Lucia Sextet" (Chi mi frena in tal momento?), from the opera Lucia di Lammermoor by Gaetano Donizetti (announced by Larry as "the Sextet from Lucy") is played on a record player and lip-synched by the Stooges in Micro-Phonies. The same melody reappears in Squareheads of the Round Table as the tune of "Oh, Elaine, Can You Come Out Tonight?". Micro-Phonies also includes the Johann Strauss II waltz "Voices of Spring" ("Frühlingsstimmen") Op. 410. Another Strauss waltz, "The Blue Danube", is featured in Ants in the Pantry and Punch Drunks.
- The original song "Frederick March" (named for actor Fredric March, but misspelled) was composed by staff musicians at the insistence of studio chief Harry Cohn. Weary of paying royalties for existing marches, Cohn wanted an original march that Columbia could own outright. "Frederick March" became a favorite of director Jules White; it appears in at least seven different Columbia shorts:
  - Termites of 1938 – The Stooges "play" this song on a violin, flute, and string bass at a dinner party in an attempt to attract mice.
  - Dutiful But Dumb – Curly is hidden inside a floor-standing radio, and plays the song on a modified harmonica.
  - Three Little Twirps – Heard as background music at the circus while Moe and Curly sell tickets.
  - Idle Roomers – Curly plays the song on a trombone to calm a wolf man—who goes berserk when he hears music.
  - Gents Without Cents – Three girls perform acrobatics on stage while this song is playing.
  - Gents in a Jam – Shemp and Moe have a problem with a radio that will not stop playing this song.
  - Pardon My Backfire – The song plays on a car radio.
- The Moe/Larry/Curly Joe lineup of the Stooges recorded several musical record albums in the early 1960s. Most of their songs were adaptations of nursery rhymes. Among their more popular recordings were "Making a Record" (a surreal trip to a recording studio built around the song "Go Tell Aunt Mary"), "Three Little Fishes", "All I Want for Christmas Is My Two Front Teeth", "Wreck the Halls with Boughs of Holly", "Mairzy Doats" and "I Want a Hippopotamus for Christmas".
- In 1983, a group called the Jump 'n the Saddle Band recorded a track called "The Curly Shuffle", which featured the narrator singing about his love of the Stooges mixed with a chorus of many of Curly's catchphrases and sound effects. In the mid-1980s, the song became a popular mid-game hit for New York Mets fans in the Shea Stadium bleachers, who danced in small groups when the song was played between innings. The music video, which featured clips of the classic Stooges shorts, was also included as a bonus feature on one of the RCA/Columbia VHS releases.

== Museum ==
Gary Lassin, grandnephew-in-law of Larry Fine, opened the Stoogeum in 2004 in Spring House, Pennsylvania, 25 miles (40 km) north of Philadelphia. It features three floors of exhibits and an 85-seat theater. Peter Seely, editor of the book Stoogeology: Essays on the Three Stooges, said that the Stoogeum has "more stuff than I even imagined existed." Some 2,500 people visit it yearly, many during the annual Three Stooges Fan Club gathering in April.

== In other media ==
=== Comic books ===
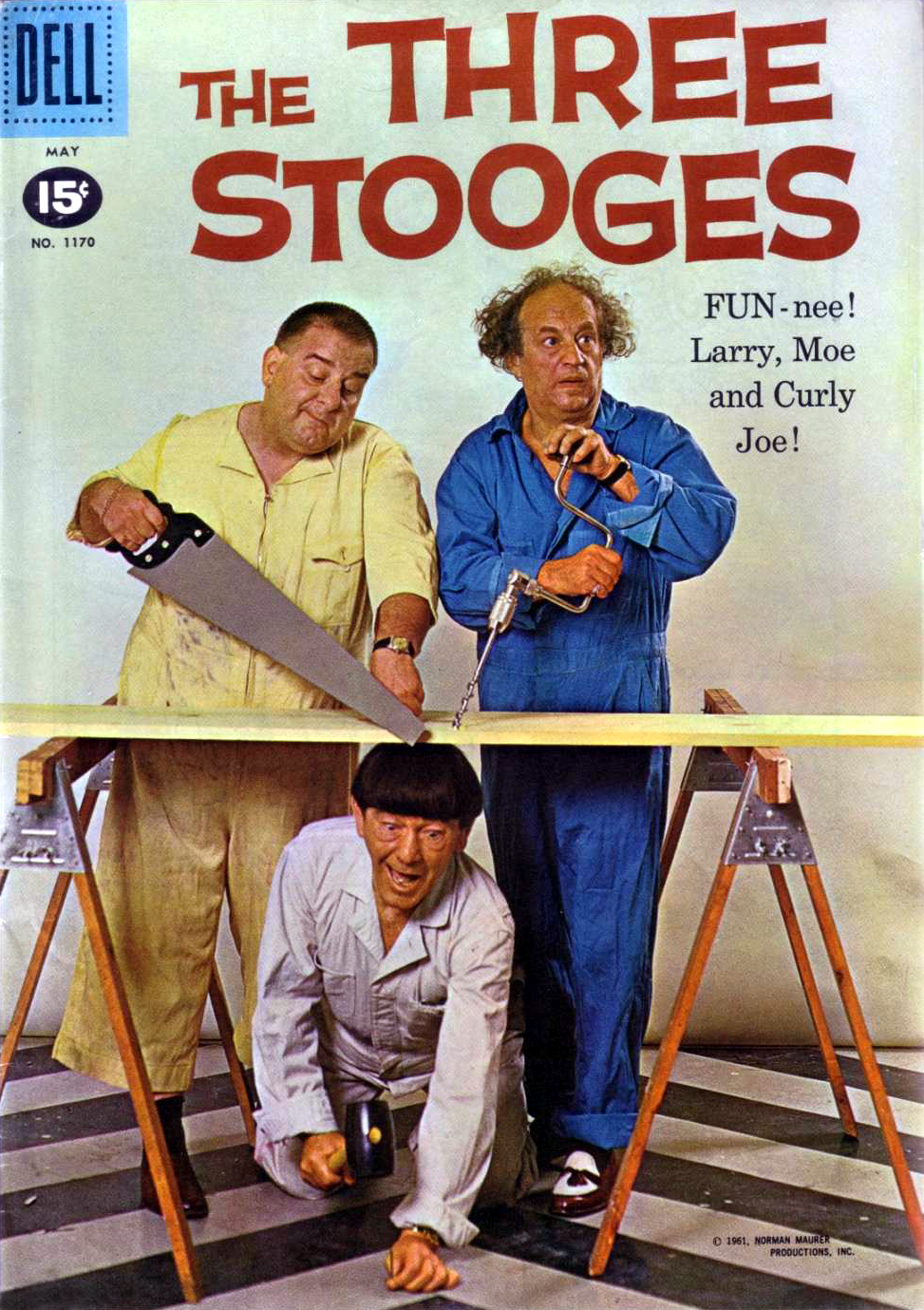
Larry and Curly Joe put Moe through his paces on the cover of The Three Stooges (Dell Comics, May 1961).

Over the years, several Three Stooges comics were produced.

- St. John Publications published the first Three Stooges comics in 1949 with two issues, then again in 1953–54 with seven issues. Shemp Howard is the Third Stooge in these issues.
- Dell Comics published a Three Stooges series first as one-shots in their Four Color Comics line for five issues, then gave them a numbered series for four more issues (#6–9). With #10, the title would be published by Gold Key Comics. Under Gold Key, the series lasted through issue #55 in 1972.
- Gold Key Comics then published a series called The Little Stooges (seven issues, 1972–74) with story and art by Norman Maurer, Moe's son-in-law. This series featured the adventures of three fictional sons of the Three Stooges, as sort of modern-day teen-age versions of the characters.
- Eclipse Comics published the Three-D Three Stooges series (three issues, 1986–1987), which reprinted stories from the St. John Publications series.
- Malibu Comics did two one-shot comics, reprinting stories from the Gold Key Comics in 1989 and 1991.
- Eternity Comics published a one-shot comic book called The Three Stooges in 3-D in 1991, reprinting four stories from the Gold Key series.
- Bluewater Comics issued a biographical comic in 2011, which followed the lives and careers of the group.
- American Mythology Production publishes comics in 2017 which shows the Three Stooges in the modern times. In 2021, American Mythology announced it was launching two new books: The Three Stooges Thru The Ages and The Robonic Stooges. Both new series are written by S.A. Check and Jordan Gershowitz.

=== Phonograph records ===
Beginning in 1959, the Three Stooges began appearing in a series of novelty records. Their first recording was a 45 rpm single of the title song from Have Rocket, Will Travel. The trio released additional singles and LPs on the Golden, Peter Pan, and Coral labels, mixing comedy adventure albums and off-beat renditions of children's songs and stories. Their final recording was the 1966 Yogi Bear and the Three Stooges Meet the Mad, Mad, Mad Dr. No-No, which incorporated the Three Stooges into the cast of the Yogi Bear cartoons.

=== Radio ===
Sirius XM Radio aired a special about the Stooges hosted by Tom Bergeron on Friday, July 31, 2009, at 2:00 pm on the Sirius Howard 101 channel. Bergeron had conducted the interviews at the age of 16 when he was still in high school in 1971. The television host had the tapes in storage for many years and was convinced on air during an interview with Howard Stern to bring them in and turn them into a special.

After finding "the lost tapes", Bergeron brought them into Stern's production studio. He stated that the tapes were so old that the tapes with the Larry Fine interviews began to shred as Stern's radio engineers ran them on their tape players. They really had only one shot, but the tapes were saved.

"The Lost Stooges Tapes" was hosted by Tom Bergeron, with modern commentary on the almost 40-year-old interviews that he had conducted with Larry Fine and Moe Howard. At the times of these interviews, Moe was still living at home, while Larry had suffered a stroke and was living in a senior citizen's home.

=== Television ===
==== The New Three Stooges (1965–66) ====
In addition to the unsuccessful television series pilots Jerks of All Trades, The Three Stooges Scrapbook, and the incomplete Kook's Tour, the Stooges appeared in an animated series, The New Three Stooges, which ran from 1965 to 1966. This series featured a mix of 41 live-action segments that were used as wraparounds to 156 animated Stooges shorts. The New Three Stooges became the only regularly scheduled television show for the Stooges. Unlike other films shorts that aired on television, like the Looney Tunes, Tom and Jerry, and Popeye, the film shorts of the Stooges never had a regularly scheduled national television program in which to air. When Columbia/Screen Gems licensed the film library to television, the shorts aired in any fashion the local stations chose (examples: late-night "filler" material between the end of the late movie and the channel's sign-off time; in "marathon" sessions running shorts back-to-back for one, one-and-a-half, or two hours; etc.) By the 1970s, some local stations showed a Columbia short and a New Three Stooges cartoon in the same broadcast.

==== The Robonic Stooges (1977–78) ====
Another animated series also produced by Hanna-Barbera, titled The Robonic Stooges, originally seen as a featured segment on The Skatebirds (CBS, 1977–1978), featuring Moe, Larry, and Curly (voiced by Paul Winchell, Joe Baker, and Frank Welker, respectively) as bionic cartoon superheroes with extendable limbs, similar to the later Inspector Gadget. The Robonic Stooges later aired as a separate half-hour series, retitled The Three Robonic Stooges (each half-hour featured two segments of The Three Robonic Stooges and one segment of Woofer & Whimper, Dog Detectives, the latter re-edited from episodes of Clue Club, an earlier Hanna-Barbera cartoon series).

==== The Three Stooges (TBA) ====
On June 9, 2015, C3 Entertainment announced it is partnering with London-based production company Cake Entertainment and animation house Titmouse, Inc. to produce a new animated Three Stooges series, consisting of 52 11-minute episodes. Christy Karacas (co-creator of Superjail!) directed the pilot episode, with Earl and Robert Benjamin, Chris Prynoski, Tom van Waveren, and Edward Galton executive producing. The series was to be launched to potential buyers at the market of the Annecy International Animated Film Festival.

==== Other appearances ====
In the October 13, 1967, "Who's Afraid of Mother Goose?" episode of ABC's World-of-Disney-like anthology series Off to See the Wizard, the Three Stooges made a short appearance as "the three men in a tub".

Two episodes of Hanna-Barbera's The New Scooby-Doo Movies aired on CBS featuring animated Stooges as guest stars: the premiere, "Ghastly Ghost Town" (September 9, 1972) and "The Ghost of the Red Baron" (November 18, 1972).

In a 1980 episode of M*A*S*H, Charles Winchester shows disrespect for three Korean doctors by calling them "Moe, Larry, and Curly", and says that they are "highly respected individuals in the States". After Winchester throws out his back and is unable to relieve the pain through conventional methods, Colonel Potter has the Korean doctors try acupuncture (much to Winchester's dismay), which cures Winchester. After the treatment, one of the doctors tells Winchester "Not bad for Three Stooges, huh?", having caught on to his mistreatment of them.

In the episode "Beware the Creeper" of The New Batman Adventures, the Joker retreats to his hideout after a quick fight with Batman. He yells out for his three henchmen "Moe? Larr? Cur?", only to find that they are not there. Shortly after that, Batman comes across these three goons in a pool hall; they have distinctive accents and hairstyles similar to those of Moe, Larry, and Curly. These henchmen are briefly seen throughout the rest of the season.

==== Television film (2000) ====
In 2000, long-time Stooge fan Mel Gibson executive-produced a TV film (The Three Stooges) about the lives and careers of the comedians. Playing Moe was Paul Ben-Victor, Evan Handler was Larry, John Kassir was Shemp, and Michael Chiklis was Curly. It was filmed in Australia and was produced for and broadcast on ABC. It was based on Michael Fleming's authorized biography of the Stooges, The Three Stooges: From Amalgamated Morons to American Icons. Its unflattering portrayal of Ted Healy led Healy's son to give media interviews calling the film inaccurate. Additional errors of fact included the portrayal that Moe Howard was down on his luck after Columbia canceled their contract and worked as a gofer at the studio, where his brothers, Larry, and he had formerly worked as actors. In reality, Moe was the most careful with his money, which he invested well. His wife Helen and he owned a comfortable house in Toluca Lake, in which they raised their children.

=== Film ===
==== It's a Mad, Mad, Mad, Mad World (1963) ====
The Three Stooges (in their Curly Joe period) made a brief cameo appearance as airport firemen in the 1963 film It's a Mad, Mad, Mad, Mad World. An epic comedy with an all-star cast, this film contains many cameo appearances by famous comedians.

==== The Three Stooges (2012) ====
A film featuring the Three Stooges, titled The Three Stooges, started production on March 14, 2011, with 20th Century Fox and was directed by the Farrelly brothers. The film had been in what one critic has dubbed "development hell". The Farrellys, who wanted to make the film since 1996, said that they were not going to do a biopic or remake, but instead new Three Stooges episodes set in the present day. The film is broken up into three continuous episodes that revolves around the Stooges characters.

Casting the title characters proved difficult for the studio. Originally slated were Sean Penn to play Larry, Benicio del Toro to play Moe, and Jim Carrey to play Curly. Both Penn and del Toro left the project, but returned while no official confirmation had been made about Jim Carrey. When del Toro was interviewed on MTV News for The Wolfman, he spoke about playing Moe. He was later asked who was going to play Larry and Curly in the film and commented that he still thought that Sean Penn and Jim Carrey were going to play them, though he added, "Nothing is for sure yet." A story in The Hollywood Reporter stated that Will Sasso would play Curly in the upcoming comedy and that Hank Azaria was the frontrunner to play Moe. Sasso was ultimately cast as Curly; Sean Hayes of Will & Grace was cast as Larry Fine, while Chris Diamantopoulos was cast as Moe. Jane Lynch later joined the cast, playing a nun. The film was released on April 13, 2012, and grossed over $54 million worldwide. The film received mixed reviews, but Diamantopoulos, Hayes, and Sasso were praised for their performances as Moe, Larry, and Curly.

==== Sequel ====
On May 7, 2015, a sequel was announced, with Sean Hayes, Chris Diamantopoulos, and Will Sasso all reprising their roles. Cameron Fay has been hired to write the script. Production was scheduled to begin in 2018.

==== The Three Little Stooges ====
On February 3, 2016, C3 announced a new comedy/adventure film titled The Three Little Stooges. It was to star Gordy De StJeor, Liam Dow, and Luke Clark as 12-year-old versions of Moe, Larry, and Curly. The first film, which set the foundation for future films and television spin-offs, was set to begin production in November 2017, and was expected to be released in 2018. The screenplay was written by Harris Goldberg, with Sean McNamara set to direct. The film's budget is $5.8 million. On July 19, 2017, C3 began seeking crowdfunding to pay for a portion of the budget. In August 2017, they exceeded their minimum goal of $50,000.

=== Video games ===
In 1984, Gottlieb released an arcade game featuring the Stooges trying to find three kidnapped brides.

Later in 1987, game developer Cinemaware released a successful Three Stooges computer game, available for Apple IIGS, Amiga, Commodore 64, MS-DOS, and Nintendo Entertainment System. Based on the Stooges earning money by doing odd jobs to prevent the foreclosure of an orphanage, it incorporated audio from the original films and was popular enough to be reissued for the Game Boy Advance in 2002, and for PlayStation in 2004.

The Three Stooges also have a slot-game adaptation created by Realtime Gaming.

=== VCR game ===
A VCR game was released by Pressman Toy Corporation in 1986, which used a number of classic Stooges clips.

== In foreign languages ==
In most other languages, the Three Stooges are known by some corresponding variant of their English name. In Chinese, however, the trio is known idiomatically as Sānge Chòu Píjiàng (三個臭皮匠) or Huóbǎo Sānrénzǔ (活寶三人組). Sānge Chòu Píjiàng, literally "Three Smelly Shoemakers", which derives from a saying in the Romance of the Three Kingdoms: Sāngè chòu píjiàng shèngguò yīgè Zhūgě Liàng (三個臭皮匠, 勝過一個諸葛亮) or "Three smelly shoemakers (are enough to) overcome one Zhuge Liang [a hero of the story]", i.e. three inferior people can overpower a superior person when they combine their strength. Huóbǎo Sānrénzǔ translates as "Trio of Buffoons". Likewise in Japanese they are known as San Baka Taishō (三ばか大将) meaning "Three Idiot Generals" or "Three Baka Generals".

In Spanish, they are known as Los tres chiflados or, roughly, "The Three Crackpots". In French and German usage, the name of the trio is partially translated as Les Trois Stooges (though the French version of the movie adaptation used a fully translated name, "Les Trois Corniauds") and Die drei Stooges respectively. In Italy they are known as I tre marmittoni. In Thai, the trio is known as 3 สมุนจอมป่วน (RTGS: Sam Samun Chom Puan, pronounced [sǎːm sāmǔn t͡ɕɔ̄ːm pùa̯n]) or 3 พี่น้องจอมยุ่ง (RTGS: Sam Phi Nong Chom Yung, pronounced [sǎːm pʰîː nɔ́ːŋ t͡ɕɔ̄ːm jûŋ]). In Portuguese, they are known as Os Três Patetas in Brazil, and Os Três Estarolas in Portugal, estarola being a direct translation of "stooge", while pateta being more related to "goofy". In Persian the trio are dubbed as "سه کله پوک". In Turkish, they are dubbed as Üç Ahbap Çavuş ("The Three Cronies").

== Awards and nominations ==
Their Men in Black (1934 film) received the comedy nomination Academy Award for Best Live Action Short Film.

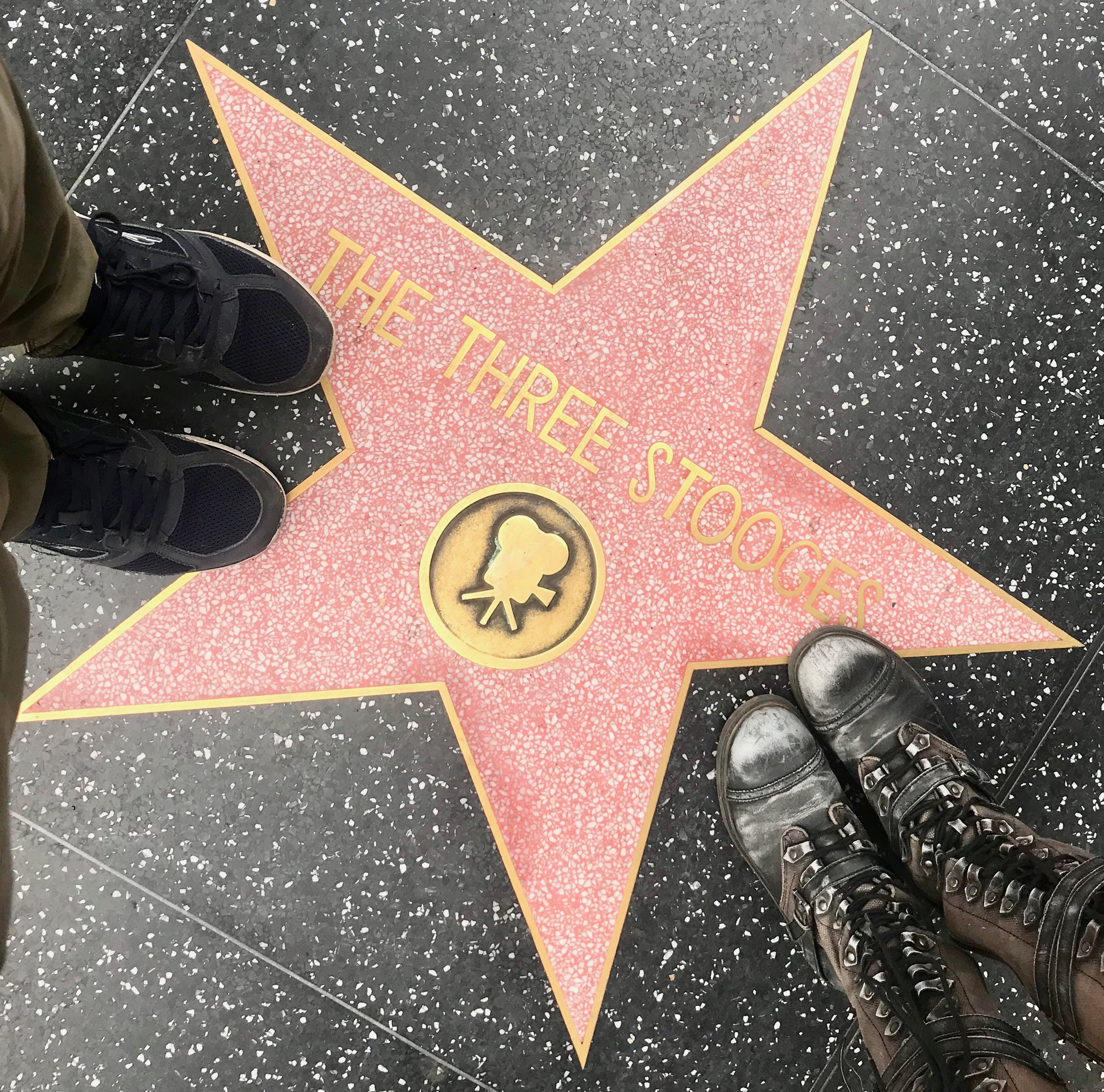
The Three Stooges star on the Hollywood Walk of Fame.

In 1993, the Three Stooges won the MTV Lifetime Achievement Award.

They received a star on the Hollywood Walk of Fame at 1560 Vine Street on August 30, 1983.

== See also ==
- List of slapstick comedy topics
- The Three Stooges filmography
