= Spooks (1953 film) =

1953 film by Jules White

Spooks!
- Directed by: Jules White
- Written by: Felix Adler
- Produced by: Jules White
- Starring: Moe Howard; Larry Fine; Shemp Howard; Philip Van Zandt; Tom Kennedy; Norma Randall; Frank Mitchell
- Distributed by: Columbia Pictures
- Release date: June 15, 1953 (U.S.)
- Running time: 15:44
- Country: United States
- Language: English

Spooks! is a 1953 short subject directed by Jules White starring American slapstick comedy team The Three Stooges (Moe Howard, Larry Fine and Shemp Howard). It is the 148th entry in the series released by Columbia Pictures starring the comedians, who released 190 shorts for the studio between 1934 and 1959.

== Plot ==
The Stooges, functioning as private investigators, are enlisted to pursue the case of a kidnapped individual, Mary Bopper, daughter of George B. Bopper. Adopting a methodical approach, they opt to retrace Bopper's steps to the location where she was last observed, ultimately directing their investigation to the domain of the enigmatic Dr. Jeckyll and his aide, Mr. Hyde.

Within this milieu, a gorilla is detained, evidently subjected to experimental inquiries. Employing subterfuge, the Stooges undertake the guise of itinerant purveyors of pies as they infiltrate the premises with the intent of effecting the rescue of the abducted girl.

== Cast ==
- Moe Howard as Moe
- Larry Fine as Larry
- Shemp Howard as Shemp and Bat
- Phil Van Zandt as Dr. Jekyll
- Tom Kennedy as Mr. Hyde
- Norma Randall as Mary B. Bopper
- Steve Calvert as Gorilla (uncredited)
- Frank Mitchell as George B. Bopper (uncredited)

== Production notes ==
Spooks! was the first of two Stooge shorts (the other being Pardon My Backfire) made by Columbia Pictures in 3D, after the 3D craze of 1953 began with Bwana Devil. It originally premiered on May 20, 1953 with the Columbia western Fort Ti (also in 3D). Hence, the lines in the opening scene (addressed to client George B. Bopper, who's awakened the snoozing Stooges):

Moe: We'll be with you before you can say "Fort Ticonderoga."
Larry: If you can say "Fort Ticonderoga."

Both the Columbia 3D Edmond O'Brien thriller Man in the Dark and Spooks! were originally sepia toned in order to allow for more light to pass through the Polaroid filters necessary for the dual-strip 3D projection method of that time. The process did not work as expected and the idea was dropped after these two productions.

This is also the first short in the series filmed for flat wide-screen. Although some films of this period were composed for the Academy aspect ratio and released in wide-screen during the confusion, Spooks! and future releases were composed at 1.85:1, Columbia's house ratio.

Spooks! was filmed on May 11–15, 1953, and released just 31 days after production due to Columbia Pictures' desire to cash in on the 3D craze. Conversely, it took five full days to complete filming, due to the complexity of shots and angle required for 3D viewing. New Stooge films produced at the time generally took no more than three days to complete, with remakes usually being completed in a single day.

== In popular culture ==
Spooks! was one of five Stooge films included in the TBS 1995 Halloween special The Three Stooges Fright Night along with If a Body Meets a Body (1945), We Want Our Mummy (1939), The Hot Scots (1948), and Malice in the Palace (1949).
