= Bedlam in Paradise =

1955 American short film by Jules White

Bedlam In Paradise
- Directed by: Jules White
- Screenplay by: Felix Adler
- Story by: Zion Myers
- Produced by: Jules White
- Starring: Moe Howard; Larry Fine; Shemp Howard; Philip Van Zandt; Sylvia Lewis; Vernon Dent; Victor Travers; Symona Boniface
- Cinematography: Ray Cory; Allen Siegler
- Distributed by: Columbia Pictures
- Release date: April 14, 1955 (U.S.)
- Running time: 15:55
- Country: United States
- Language: English

Bedlam in Paradise is a 1955 short subject directed by Jules White starring American slapstick comedy team The Three Stooges (Moe Howard, Larry Fine and Shemp Howard). It is the 162nd entry in the series released by Columbia Pictures starring the comedians, who released 190 shorts for the studio between 1934 and 1959.

== Plot ==
Shemp grapples with the liminality between life and death while under the care of Moe and Larry in his final moments. Confronted with mortality, Shemp articulates a warning to his companions, hinting at the possibility of his posthumous presence as a harbinger of consequence should they deviate from moral rectitude. Upon Shemp's transition to the afterlife, his Uncle Mortimer deliberates over the disposition of his soul, pondering whether Shemp's deeds warrant celestial ascension or infernal descent.

The arrival of the Devil, represented by the enigmatic figure of Mr. Helle, introduces a moral dilemma, as he seeks to entice Shemp with hedonistic temptations personified by the seductive allure of Helen Blazes. Amidst this existential quandary, Uncle Mortimer intervenes, offering Shemp a chance at redemption and eternal bliss in Heaven contingent upon his covert return to Earth to influence the moral rectitude of Moe and Larry.

Meanwhile, Mr. Helle, in his diabolical guise, incites Moe and Larry towards acts of moral turpitude, suggesting fraudulent schemes such as soliciting financing from a wealthy couple for the production of novelty fountain pens. Shemp's intervention thwarts their machinations, albeit inadvertently instigating a calamitous fire. The narrative then transitions back to the setting of Shemp's bedroom, revealing the preceding events to be an allegorical dream sequence. However, the dream's symbolic implications manifest in reality as Shemp finds himself in imminent peril due to his negligent behavior of falling asleep while smoking. Following the extinguishment of the conflagration, Shemp recounts his dreamlike experience to Moe and Larry, prompting a comically anticlimactic response from his cousins in the form of a cream pie assault and a sardonic offering of writing implements.

== Cast ==
=== Credited ===
- Moe Howard as Moe, Uncle Mortimer and Heavenly Train announcer (voice)
- Larry Fine as Larry
- Shemp Howard as Shemp
- Vernon Dent as I. Fleecem (stock footage)
- Philip Van Zandt as The Devil / Mr. Heller
- Sylvia Lewis as Helen Blazes

=== Uncredited ===
- Marti Shelton as Miss Jones (stock footage)
- Judy Malcolm as Heavenly switchboard operator (stock footage)
- Victor Travers as Mr. DePeyster (stock footage)
- Symona Boniface as Mrs. DePeyster (stock footage)
- Brian O'Hara as Gunslinger (stock footage. was cameo)

== Production notes ==
Bedlam in Paradise is a remake of Heavenly Daze, using ample stock footage. The new footage was filmed on July 9, 1954. Coincidentally, as the musical Carousel was a hit in Broadway at the time of the making of Heavenly Daze, the film version of Carousel was in production when Bedlam in Paradise was made.

A sequence in the film's script required a fountain pen to be propelled into the center of Larry's forehead. This was to be achieved by affixing the pen to a wire and aiming it at a small aperture in a tin plate secured to Larry's head. However, an error by the special effects team resulted in the pen's sharp point penetrating Larry's skin, causing a significant laceration and substantial bleeding. Subsequently, Moe pursued director Jules White around the set, as White had assured that the gag would be without risk.

While in the original short Heavenly Daze Shemp ends the episode with the phrase (while writing the letter), "Dear Ma", in Bedlam in Paradise there was a re-dubbing of Shemp's voice and the line is changed to "Dear Uncle Mortimer"

== See also ==
- List of American films of 1955
