= Husbands Beware =

1956 film by Jules White

- Directed by: Jules White; Edward Bernds (stock footage)
- Screenplay by: Felix Adler
- Story by: Clyde Bruckman
- Produced by: Jules White
- Starring: Moe Howard; Larry Fine; Shemp Howard; Lou Leonard; Maxine Gates; Christine McIntyre; Dee Green; Emil Sitka; Doris Houck; Nancy Saunders
- Cinematography: Henry Freulich
- Edited by: Anthony DiMarco
- Distributed by: Columbia Pictures
- Release date: January 5, 1956 (U.S.)
- Running time: 15:53
- Country: United States
- Language: English

Husbands Beware is a 1956 short subject directed by Jules White starring American slapstick comedy team The Three Stooges (Moe Howard, Larry Fine and Shemp Howard). It is the 167th entry in the series released by Columbia Pictures starring the comedians, who released 190 shorts for the studio between 1934 and 1959.

== Plot ==
Moe and Larry, precipitated by familial ties, find themselves wedded to Shemp's corpulent sisters, only to realize post-nuptials the unenviable nature of their matrimonial alliances. Tasked with the onerous responsibility of orchestrating a wedding feast, their culinary endeavors culminate in culinary calamities, including indigestible muffins, tainted coffee, and a turkey imbued with flammable turpentine. Their dismal matrimonial predicaments precipitate their expulsion from the familial abode, instigating a vow of retribution against Shemp, the unwitting matchmaker.

Meanwhile, Shemp, a music instructor, finds himself entangled in an opportunity, wherein matrimony within a tight temporal constraint promises a substantial inheritance from his ostensibly deceased uncle Calib's estate. The ensuing scramble for a suitable spouse ensnares Shemp in a labyrinthine web of chaos, as erstwhile paramours and opportunists converge upon the matrimonial prospect.

Ultimately, Shemp's precipitous union with Fanny Dinkelmeyer, orchestrated within the stipulated time frame, unravels the machinations of his purported inheritance. Discovering the ruse orchestrated by Moe and Larry as retribution for their matrimonial misadventures, Shemp's ire culminates in a vengeful act of violence against his erstwhile compatriots.

== Cast ==
=== Credited ===
- Moe Howard as Moe
- Larry Fine as Larry
- Shemp Howard as Shemp
- Lou Leonard as Dora
- Maxine Gates as Flora
- Christine McIntyre as Lulu Hopkins (stock footage)
- Dee Green as Fanny Dinkelmeyer (stock footage)

=== Uncredited ===
- Emil Sitka as Justice of the Peace Benton
- Doris Houck as Aggressive former girlfriend (stock footage)
- Nancy Saunders, Judy Malcolm, Virginia Hunter, and Alyn Lockwood as Shemp's former Girlfriends (all stock footage)
- Johnny Kascier as Bellboy (stock footage)
- Sally Cleaves as Fanny Dinkelmeyer (new footage)

== Production notes ==
The second half of Husbands Beware is stock footage from 1947's Brideless Groom. In the new footage of the wedding sequence, a double stands in for Dee Green (Fanny Dinkelmeyer). New scenes were filmed on May 17, 1955.

Husbands Beware was the first posthumous Stooge release featuring Shemp Howard, who died on November 22, 1955.

This was the last film written by Clyde Bruckman before his suicide in 1955, borrowing silent film comedian Buster Keaton's gun to kill himself inside a Hollywood restaurant bathroom.

== See also ==
- List of American films of 1956
