= Florence Lake =

American actress (1904–1980)

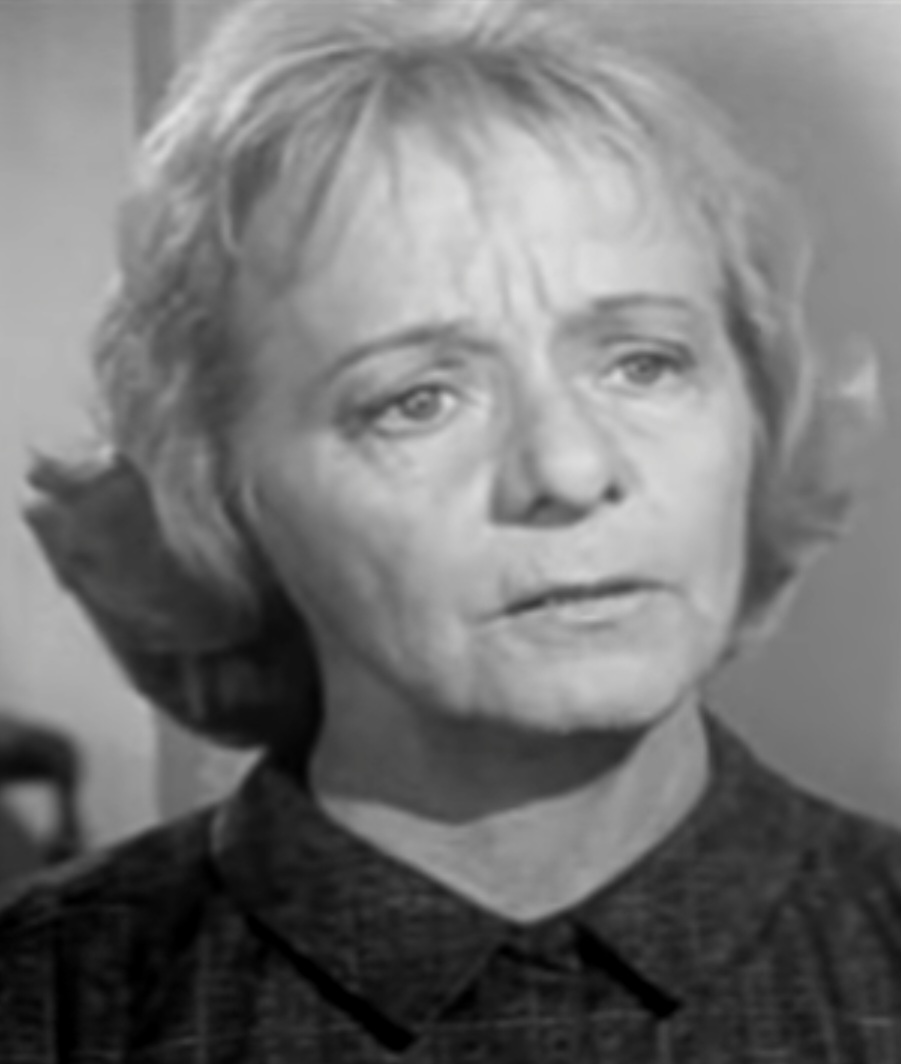
- Lake in an episode of Lock-Up (1961)
- Born: Florence Silverlake; November 27, 1904; Charleston, South Carolina, U.S.
- Died: April 11, 1980 (aged 75); Los Angeles, California, U.S.
- Resting place: Woodlawn Memorial Cemetery, Santa Monica, California
- Occupation: Actress
- Years active: 1929–1976
- Known for: Playing Mrs. Kennedy in the Edgar Kennedy comedy shorts and Jenny, the Calverton telephone operator in Lassie
- Spouse: John Graham Owens (m. 1950)
- Children: 1
- Relatives: Arthur Lake (brother)

Florence Lake Owens (born Florence Silverlake; November 27, 1904 – April 11, 1980) was an American actress best known as the leading lady in most of the Edgar Kennedy comedy shorts.

== Early life ==
Florence Lake (née Silverlake) was born on November 27, 1904, in Charleston, South Carolina. In the early 1900s, her father Arthur Silverlake and uncle Archie Silverlake toured with a circus in an aerial act known as The Flying Silverlakes. Her mother, Edith Goodwin, was an actress. Her parents later appeared in vaudeville in a skit "Family Affair", traveling throughout the South and Southwest United States. Florence and her younger brother Arthur Silverlake, Jr. became part of the act in 1910. Their mother brought the children to Hollywood to get into the burgeoning film industry. Arthur changed his professional name to Arthur Lake and later achieved great success as Dagwood Bumstead in the movie series Blondie.

== Early career ==
Before acting in films, Lake was the leading lady for the Raynor Lehr stock theater company. Her film debut came in New Year's Eve (1929).

== Comic acting persona ==
Lake was petite, with a high-pitched speaking voice. She perfected a comical, sing-song delivery that established her in "dumb" roles. She personified flightiness in the Kennedy shorts as the scatterbrained Mrs. Kennedy. After the series ended with Kennedy's death in 1948, she continued to play character roles in films and television. Her best-known TV role was Jenny, the Calverton telephone operator in Lassie. Lake played the role for the entire 10-year "farm seasons" of the show (1954–1964), thus becoming the Lassie player with the longest run on the series. She played the role of Mama Angel in "The Angel and the Outlaw", and "Mission for Tonto" two 1957 episodes of the TV series The Lone Ranger. She also appeared in the first color episode of the TV series The Adventures of Superman in 1957 as a cave woman.

On old-time radio, Lake portrayed Jessie in Charlie and Jessie, Tess Terwilliger in David Harum, Mrs. Featherstone's daughter in The Gay Mrs. Featherstone, and Miss Smith in Phone Again Finnegan.

In her later years, Lake appeared as Elvira Norton on an episode of Dragnet titled "Frauds". She appeared in an episode of the 1973 sitcom A Touch of Grace, and later that year played a blind date for the character Lou Grant on The Mary Tyler Moore Show episode "Lou's First Date". Her last roles were in the TV series Emergency!, Baretta in 1976, and Most Wanted in 1977.

== Death ==
She died in 1980 and was interred in Woodlawn Memorial Cemetery, Santa Monica, California.

== Selected filmography ==
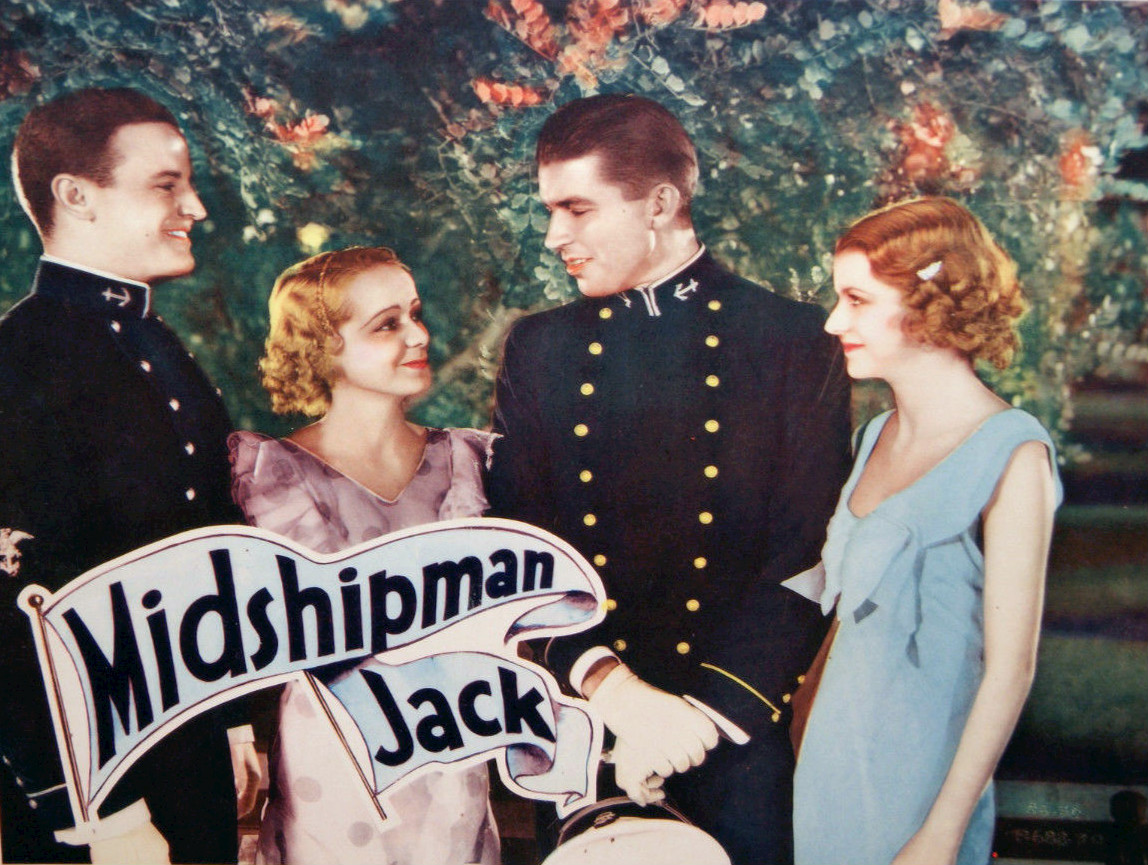
Lobby card for Midshipman Jack (1933)

- New Year's Eve (1929) - Pearl
- Thru Different Eyes (1929) - Myrtle
- The Rogue Song (1930) - Nadja
- Romance (1930) - Susan Van Tuyl
- The Drums of Jeopardy (1931) - Anya Karlov
- The Spirit of Notre Dame (1931) - Trixie Hayes (uncredited)
- Secret Service (1931) - Miss Caroline Mitford
- Ladies of the Jury (1932) - Mrs. Dace (uncredited)
- Night World (1932) - Ms. Smith (uncredited)
- Westward Passage (1932) - Elmer's Wife
- Frisco Jenny (1932) - Ticklish Girl (uncredited)
- Midshipman Jack (1933) - Sally Withers
- The Sweetheart of Sigma Chi (1933) - Dizzy
- Only Yesterday (1933) - One of Jim's Friends (uncredited)
- Jimmy and Sally (1933) - Marlowe Employee (uncredited)
- Two-Fisted (1935) - Doris Pritchard (uncredited)
- Muss 'Em Up (1936) - Tony's Girlfriend (uncredited)
- The Singing Kid (1936) - Young Woman (scenes deleted)
- Women Are Trouble (1936) - Clara (uncredited)
- To Mary – with Love (1936) - Salesgirl
- Quality Street (1937) - Henrietta Turnbull (uncredited)
- Love in a Bungalow (1937) - The 'Ga-Ga' Prospect
- I Met My Love Again (1938) - Carol Towner
- Condemned Women (1938) - Prisoner
- Law of the Underworld (1938) - Mrs. Billy Winters (uncredited)
- Rebellious Daughters (1938) - Dizzy
- Having Wonderful Time (1938) - Camp Guest (uncredited)
- Next Time I Marry (1938) - Justice of the Peace's Wife (uncredited)
- Dramatic School (1938) - Factory Worker (uncredited)
- Convicts at Large (1938) - Hattie
- Pacific Liner (1939) - Miss Smith - Dancing with Crusher (uncredited)
- Stagecoach (1939) - Mrs. Nancy Whitney (uncredited)
- Union Pacific (1939) - Woman (uncredited)
- Bachelor Mother (1939) - Oliver's Wife (uncredited)
- When Tomorrow Comes (1939) - Waitress (uncredited)
- 5th Ave Girl (1939) - Slavey - the Cook's Helper (uncredited)
- Four Jacks and a Jill (1942) - Counter Girl (uncredited)
- Scattergood Survives a Murder (1942) - Phoebe Quentin
- Crash Dive (1943) - Doris - Jean's Roommate (uncredited)
- Hi'ya, Sailor (1943) - Secretary
- Her Primitive Man (1944) - Miss Crims (uncredited)
- Casanova Brown (1944) - Nurse Phillips (uncredited)
- San Diego, I Love You (1944) - Miss Lake
- Goin' to Town (1944) - Abigail
- Hi, Beautiful (1944) - Mrs. Bisbee
- George White's Scandals (1945) - Mother (scenes deleted)
- Riverboat Rhythm (1946) - Penelope Beeler Witherspoon
- Little Giant (1946) - (uncredited)
- The Time, the Place and the Girl (1946) - Kathy (uncredited)
- All Gummed Up (1947, Short) - Aged Serena (uncredited)
- My Wild Irish Rose (1947) - Diner at White Horse Tavern (uncredited)
- The Stratton Story (1949) - Mrs. Appling (uncredited)
- Ambush (1950) - Mrs. Wolverson (uncredited)
- Man from the Black Hills (1952) - Martha
- Fargo (1952) - Maggie
- The Maverick (1952) - Grandma Watson
- Bubble Trouble (1953, Short) - Old Serena Flint
- She Couldn't Say No (1953) - Mrs. Gruman (uncredited)
- The Flaming Urge (1953) - Mrs. Binger
- Bitter Creek (1954) - Mrs. Hammond
- The Desperado (1954) - Mrs. Cameron
- The Lone Ranger (1955) - Season 5 Episode 34 - Emmy Corkle
- The Adventures of Superman (1955) - Season 3 Episode 1, "Through the Time Barrier" - Cavewoman
- The Boss (1956) - Waitress (uncredited)
- Petticoat Junction (1966 - S3Ep30) as Mrs. Latimer
- The Ghost and Mr. Chicken (1966) - Occult Clubwoman (uncredited)
- The Big Mouth (1967) - Assaulted Lady (uncredited)
- Savage Intruder (1970) - Mildred
- Adam-12 - "The Grandmothers" (1971) as Mrs. Frieda Pine
- Time to Run (1973)
- Frasier, the Sensuous Lion (1973) - Old Woman on Porch
- Mary Tyler Moore (1973), Series 4, episode 8, “Lou’s First Date” - Martha Dudley
- Welcome to Arrow Beach (1974) - Landlady
- The Day of the Locust

(1974) - Old Woman

- ‘’Rockford Files’’, Season 1, episode 5

(1975) - Lee Sisters #2

- Emergency! (1976-S5Ep18) - as Maggie
