= Phyllis Crane =

Canadian-American actress (1914–82)

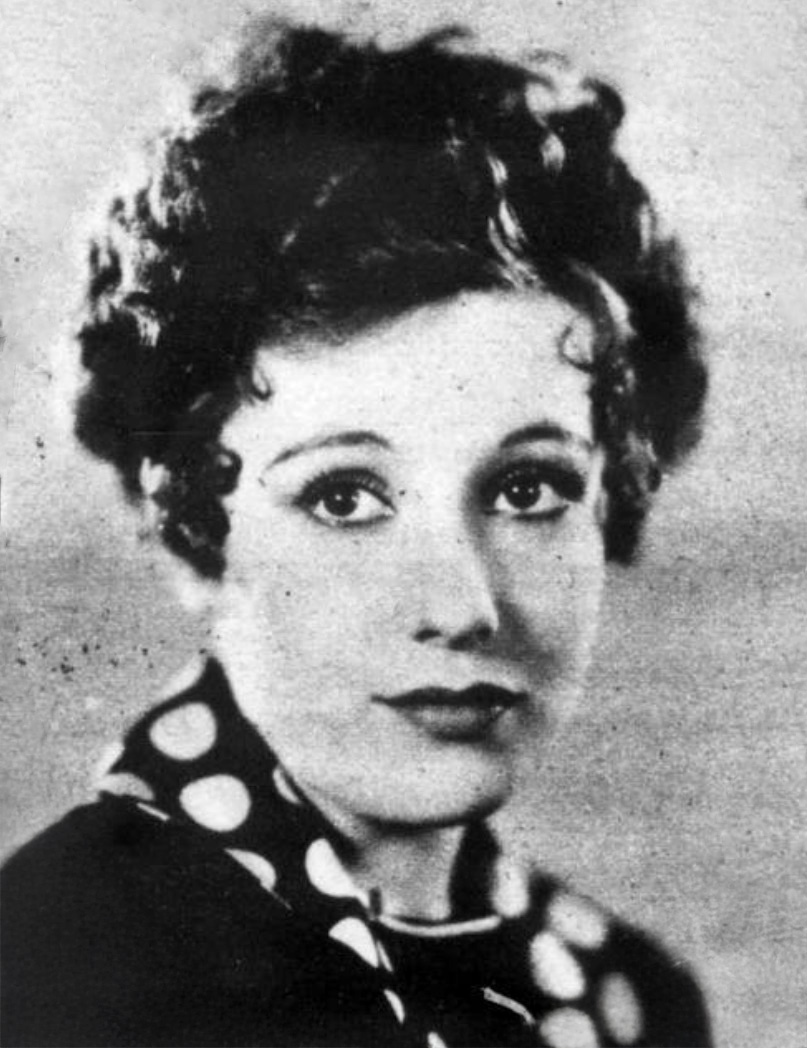
- Crane pictured around 1930
- Born: Phyllis Francis; August 7, 1914; Calgary, Alberta, Canada
- Died: October 12, 1982 (aged 68); New York City, New York, U.S.
- Occupation: Actress
- Years active: 1928–1937

Phyllis Crane (August 7, 1914 – October 12, 1982) was a Canadian-born American film actress. She appeared in more than 45 films between 1928 and 1937.

== Career ==
Crane signed with Columbia Pictures in 1934. Modern viewers will recognize Crane from her appearances in several early Three Stooges films, such as Three Little Pigskins, Uncivil Warriors, and Pop Goes the Easel.

Perhaps her most famous role was as Professor Nichols' daughter in Hoi Polloi whom Moe Howard tries to romance. While talking to him, she coos that he will find the "eternal spring" (the season).

== Death ==
Crane died at age 68 of esophageal cancer in New York City on October 12, 1982.

== Selected filmography ==
- So This Is College (1929)
- The Girl Said No (1930)
- College Lovers (1930)
- Ten Cents a Dance (1931)
- Possessed (1931) (uncredited)
- Hollywood Party (1934)
- Men in Black (1934) (uncredited)
- Three Little Pigskins (1934)
- Pop Goes the Easel (1935) (uncredited)
- Uncivil Warriors (1935)
- Hoi Polloi (1935) (uncredited)
- Ants in the Pantry (1936) (uncredited)
- Below the Deadline (1936) (uncredited)
- A Pain in the Pullman (1936) (uncredited)
- My Man Godfrey (1936) (uncredited)
