= Brideless Groom =

1947 film by Edward Bernds

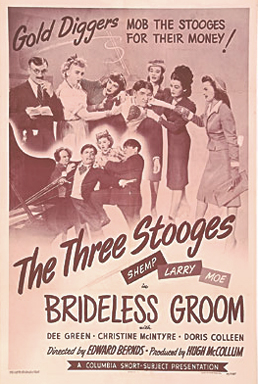
- Directed by: Edward Bernds
- Written by: Clyde Bruckman
- Produced by: Hugh McCollum
- Starring: Shemp Howard; Larry Fine; Moe Howard; Dee Green; Christine McIntyre; Doris Houck; Emil Sitka
- Cinematography: Vincent J. Farrar
- Edited by: Henry DeMond
- Distributed by: Columbia Pictures
- Release date: September 11, 1947 (U.S.)
- Running time: 16:51
- Country: United States
- Language: English

Brideless Groom is a 1947 short subject directed by Edward Bernds starring American slapstick comedy team The Three Stooges (Moe Howard, Larry Fine and Shemp Howard). It is the 101st entry in the series released by Columbia Pictures starring the comedians, who released 190 shorts for the studio between 1934 and 1959.

== Plot ==
Watch Brideless Groom

Shemp is a music teacher navigating the affections of his musically challenged student, Miss Dinkelmeyer, while Larry serves as his musical accompanist.

Moe interrupts Shemp's classroom session with news of his uncle Caleb's demise. Shemp initially disparages his late relative, but his demeanor changes quickly upon learning of his unexpected inheritance of US$500,000 (equivalent to $7.2 million in 2025), prompting a sudden change in his disposition towards his deceased uncle. Shemp's windfall comes with a caveat, however; he must marry within a mere 48-hour window to claim his newfound wealth. To make matters worse, 41 hours have already passed, meaning he has just 7 hours left to complete his task.

Faced with the urgent need for a bride, Shemp frantically reaches out to various acquaintances in his address book, proposing to multiple women in a desperate bid to meet the stipulated deadline. His attempts prove futile, however, leading to a series of calamitous misadventures orchestrated by Moe and Larry, including an inadvertent engagement to Miss Dinkelmeyer and encounters with aggressive ex-girlfriends eager to capitalize on Shemp's newfound fortune.

As the wedding ceremony ensues, chaos erupts as the multitude of prospective brides converge upon the justice's office, igniting a frenzied melee of physical altercations. Moe and Larry find themselves ensnared in the escalating turmoil, enduring blows and comedic mishaps amidst the tumultuous pursuit of matrimony. Despite the pandemonium, Shemp ultimately seals his union with Miss Dinkelmeyer, securing his inheritance just in time.

== Cast ==
=== Credited ===
- Moe Howard as Moe
- Larry Fine as Larry
- Shemp Howard as Professor Shemp Howard
- Dee Green as Miss Dinkelmeyer
- Christine McIntyre as Miss Hopkins
- Doris Houck as Aggressive former girlfriend

=== Uncredited ===
- Emil Sitka as Justice of the Peace J.M. Benton
- Johnny Kascier as Bellboy
- Virginia Hunter as Shemp's former girlfriend
- Judy Malcolm as Shemp's former girlfriend
- Alyn Lockwood as Shemp's former girlfriend
- Bertha Priestley as Fat Woman in Hallway
- Nancy Saunders as Shemp's former girlfriend

== Production notes ==
Brideless Groom was filmed on March 11–14, 1947. The plot theme of Brideless Groom is not unique, having been used in (among others) the Buster Keaton comedy Seven Chances (1925), which would be remade more than seven decades later as The Bachelor (1999). Writer Clyde Bruckman was also partially responsible for Seven Chances. Brideless Groom would be recycled in the second half of the Stooge short Husbands Beware (1956).

The film features longtime Stooges supporting player Emil Sitka's best-remembered line "Hold hands, you lovebirds!" (the line is actually engraved on Sitka's headstone). The shot where Sitka has a birdcage smashed on his head was worked into the film Pulp Fiction (1994) when Eric Stoltz is watching television.

The version of "Voices of Spring" during Shemp and Miss Dinkelmeyer's singing lesson was sung by frequent Stooge co-star Christine McIntyre, who appears in this short as Miss Hopkins. This version of "Voices of Spring", along with McIntyre herself, were previously used in the Stooges' Micro-Phonies (1945).

=== Shemp's injury ===
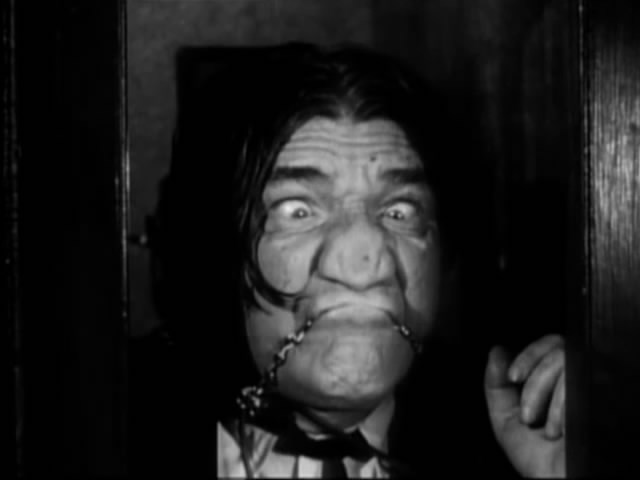
Shemp Howard in the phone booth.

Brideless Groom features a sequence with Christine McIntyre who portrays Miss Hopkins, a woman whom Shemp actively pursues for his wife. Unfortunately, she mistakes him for her cousin Basil. After learning her mistake, she takes it out on poor Shemp by slapping him silly, then finally punching him through her door. During the filming of the scene, when McIntyre threw her punch, she leaned too far into it and hit Shemp for real, ultimately breaking his nose. This mistake was left in the film, and when watched in slow motion, Shemp can be seen falling down and opening his mouth like he was yelling in pain after the punch. Director Edward Bernds remembered getting McIntyre to give Shemp the blows:

In the story, Shemp had a few hours in which to get married if he wanted to inherit his uncle's fortune. He called on Christine McIntyre, who mistook him for her cousin (Basil), took him to her apartment and greeted him with hugs and kisses. Then the real cousin phoned and she accused Shemp of kissing her, as it were, under false pretenses. At this point, she was supposed to slap Shemp around. Lady that she was, McIntyre couldn't do it right; she dabbed at him daintily, afraid of hurting him. After a couple of bad takes Shemp pleaded with her. "Honey," he said, "if you want to do me a favor, cut loose and do it right. A lot of half-hearted slaps hurt more than one good one. Give it to me, Chris, and let's get it over with". She got up her courage and, on the next take, let Shemp have it. It wound up as a whole series of slaps — the timing was beautiful; they rang out like pistol shots. Shemp was knocked into a chair, bounced up, met another ringing slap, fell down again, scrambled up, trying to explain, only to get another stinging slap. Then Chris delivered a haymaker — a right that knocked Shemp through the door. When the take was over, Shemp was groggy, really groggy. His nose was broken. After Bernds called out, "cut!", Chris put her arms around Shemp and apologized tearfully. "It's alright, honey," Shemp said painfully. "I said you should cut loose and you did. You sure as hell did!"

== Copyright status ==
Brideless Groom is one of four Columbia Stooge shorts that fell into the public domain after their copyright expired in 1964, the other three being Disorder in the Court (1936), Sing a Song of Six Pants (1947), and Malice in the Palace (1949). As such, these four shorts frequently appear on budget VHS and DVD compilations. The remastered print of the short film (alongside Disorder in the Court and Sing a Song of Six Pants) was officially released on Blu-ray on August 13, 2024 as part of The Three Stooges Collection by Sony Pictures Home Entertainment.

== See also ==
- List of American films of 1947
- List of films in the public domain in the United States
- Public domain film
