= The Hot Scots =

1948 American short film by Edward Bernds

- Directed by: Edward Bernds
- Written by: Elwood Ullman
- Produced by: Hugh McCollum
- Starring: Moe Howard; Larry Fine; Shemp Howard; Christine McIntyre; Herbert Evans; Charles Knight; Ted Lorch; Clive Morgan; James Logan
- Cinematography: Allen G. Siegler
- Edited by: Henry DeMond
- Distributed by: Columbia Pictures
- Release date: July 8, 1948 (U.S.)
- Running time: 17:26
- Country: United States
- Language: English

The Hot Scots is a 1948 short subject directed by Edward Bernds starring American slapstick comedy team The Three Stooges (Moe Howard, Larry Fine and Shemp Howard). It is the 108th entry in the series released by Columbia Pictures starring the comedians, who released 190 shorts for the studio between 1934 and 1959.

== Plot ==
Upon their arrival in London, the Stooges endeavor to secure employment with Scotland Yard subsequent to their completion of studies at a correspondence detective school. However, their aspirations are curtailed as they find themselves relegated to menial tasks as "Yard Men," tasked with the sanitation of the premises and tending to the gardens. It is amidst the task of yard maintenance that an opportunity for case resolution emerges.

Disguised in kilts and adopting contrived Scottish accents, the Stooges, adopting the aliases McMoe, McLarry, and McShemp, journey to Scotland, assuming the responsibility of safeguarding the esteemed possessions housed within the precincts of Glenheather Castle, under the auspices of The Earl. Unbeknownst to them, the castle's staff are complicit in a scheme to pilfer its treasures, taking advantage of the Stooges' presence as they slumber within its walls.

However, the Stooges ultimately apprehend the perpetrators, led by the nefarious Lorna Doone, who, under the guise of the Earl's secretary, orchestrates the clandestine operation. Their triumph is ephemeral as, amidst their jubilation, they encounter a bagpipe-playing skeletal apparition, prompting their hasty departure from the castle premises.

== Cast ==
- Shemp Howard as Shemp
- Larry Fine as Larry
- Moe Howard as Moe
- Herbert Evans as The Earl of Glenheather
- Christine McIntyre as Lorna Doone
- Charles Knight as Angus
- Ted Lorch as MacPherson
- Clive Morgan as Inspector McCormick (uncredited)
- James Logan as Constable Dawson (uncredited)

== Production notes ==
The Hot Scots was the 11th Stooge film released but only the fourth one filmed after Shemp rejoined the comedy team. Filming took place on December 16–19, 1946, but was withheld from release until July 1948, 19 months later. It was remade in 1954 as Scotched in Scotland, using ample stock footage. In addition, the Scotland Yard scenes were reused in 1955's Hot Ice.

Like Squareheads of the Round Table and Fiddlers Three, The Hot Scots was filmed on the existing set of the feature film The Bandit of Sherwood Forest.

Christine McIntyre's character's name of Lorna Doone is taken from the title character of a romance/historical novel set in 17th century England. There is also a reference to the Nabisco shortbread cookies of the same name (Lorna offering cookies to Moe). The Hot Scots was the last film featuring new footage of longtime Stooge supporting actor Theodore Lorch, who died in November 1947. This film was released posthumously.

== In popular culture ==
The Hot Scots was one of five Stooge shorts included in a 1995 airing of the TBS Halloween special The Three Stooges Fright Night along with Spooks (1953), If a Body Meets a Body (1945), We Want Our Mummy (1939), and Malice in the Palace (1949).
