= Uncivil Warriors =

1935 American short film by Del Lord

- The Stooges were not professionally known as "The Three Stooges" when this film was released as they were billed by their individual names
- Directed by: Del Lord
- Written by: Felix Adler
- Produced by: Jules White
- Starring: Moe Howard; Larry Fine; Curly Howard; Bud Jamison; Ted Lorch; James C. Morton; Phyllis Crane
- Cinematography: John Stumar
- Edited by: Charles Hochberg
- Music by: R.H. Bassett
- Distributed by: Columbia Pictures
- Release date: April 26, 1935 (U.S.)
- Running time: 19:33
- Language: English

Uncivil Warriors is a 1935 short subject directed by Del Lord starring American slapstick comedy team The Three Stooges (Moe Howard, Larry Fine and Jerry Howard). It is the eighth entry in the series released by Columbia Pictures starring the comedians, who released 190 shorts for the studio between 1934 and 1959.

== Plot ==
Set during the American Civil War, the short begins with a Northern General assigning Larry, Moe, and Curly — designated as Operators 12, 14, and 15, respectively — to undertake a clandestine mission behind enemy lines. Tasked with securing vital intelligence, the trio assumes the guise of Southern officers, adopting the aliases Lieutenant Duck, Captain Dodge, and Major Hyde, respectively. Their infiltration of the mansion belonging to Confederate officer Colonel Buttz marks the commencement of a series of misadventures.

During preparations for a dinner party, Curly assists the Colonel's daughter, Judith, in preparing a cake, but inadvertently incorporates a quilted potholder between the cake's layers. When they are served the dessert, the Stooges struggle to conceal the strenuous effort required to chew and swallow the indigestible cake, and afterwards expel copious feathers in spasms of coughing. The short concludes with an episode in which Major "Bloodhound" Filbert visits the Buttz mansion to investigate a rumor that Northern spies are present. Filbert's inquiries prompt Larry and Curly to disguise themselves as Captain Dodge's father and wife. When Filbert asks the spurious Mrs. Dodge what has happened to her baby, Moe rushes off find a baby to satisfy the skeptical Major. He returns carrying a swaddled infant whose unexpected racial identity unveils the Stooges' subterfuge.

Their ruse exposed, the trio's desperate bid for escape culminates in their refuge within a hollow "log" – which turns out to be a camouflaged cannon. The Stooges become airborne when the cannon is fired by the Confederates. As the Union General wonders aloud where the three spies are, the trio promptly fall from the sky and onto the General.

== Cast ==
=== Credited ===
- Moe Howard as Operator 14/Captain Dodge
- Larry Fine as Operator 12/Lieutenant Duck
- Curly Howard as Operator 15/Major Hyde

=== Uncredited ===
- Bud Jamison as Colonel Buttz
- Ted Lorch as Major "Bloodhound" Filbert
- James C. Morton as Union Army General
- Phyllis Crane as Judith Buttz
- Celeste Edwards as Clementine Buttz
- Jenifer Gray as Judith Buttz's friend
- Marvin Loback as Colonel
- Ford West as Lieutenant Colonel
- Si Jenks as Major
- Billy Engle as Captain
- Charles Dorety as Bugler
- Lew Davis as Orderly
- Heinie Conklin as 1st Confederate sentry
- John Rand as 2nd Confederate sentry
- Lou Archer as Charlie
- Charlie Phillips as General Buttz's aide
- George Gray as Pursuing soldier
- Hubert Diltz as Confederate cannoneer
- Harry Keatan as Confederate cannoneer
- Charles Cross as Soldier
- Wes Warner as stuntman

== Production notes ==
Uncivil Warriors was filmed on March 13–18, 1935. It is the first short in which the Stooges mention "Good Time Charlie". When the Stooges meet a guard, they often reference Charlie. The guard asks who Charlie is, and a Stooge replies that "everybody knows Charlie. He walks like this." The Stooges then demonstrate a silly walk until they get clear of the guard, at which point they take off running. This is a recurring joke in the Stooge shorts. In Uncivil Warriors, they actually meet a soldier named Charlie, who asks the Stooges, "Are you all looking for me?"

The potholder gag would later appear in the Shemp-era short Three Hams on Rye during a live theatrical production. A similar sequence also appears in the 1947 short All Gummed Up, also featuring Shemp. The scene is nearly identical, with bubblegum being used in the place of a potholder, the stooges coughing up bubbles rather than feathers as a result.

When Moe brings the black baby into the Colonel's office he attempts to explain how the baby got his dark complexion ("We had him down the beach all summer...he got quite sunburned!"); this is sometimes deleted for U.S. television broadcasts.

The introductory music over the titles is a medley of "Battle Hymn of the Republic" (most popular marching song of the Union Army) and "Dixie" (which had the same status in the Confederate Army).
