= Lu Leonard =

American actress (1926–2004)

- Leonard in 1965
- Born: Mary Lou Price; June 5, 1926; Long Beach, New York, U.S.
- Died: May 14, 2004 (aged 77); Los Angeles, California, U.S.
- Other name: Lou Leonard
- Occupations: Actress, voice actress
- Years active: 1954–1995

Lu Leonard (born Mary Lou Price; June 5, 1926 – May 14, 2004) credited also as Lou Leonard, was an American character actress who appeared in numerous television series, theatre and, briefly, film. She was the daughter of actor Hal Price. She was best known for her role as Mrs. Pugh in Annie.

== Biography ==
=== Early life ===
Leonard was born Mary Lou Price in Long Beach, New York to stage and screen actor Hal Price, notable for his film with Republic Pictures and Amy Goodrich. She appeared on stage at 1 month with her vaudevillian parents, whom she would later write a play about entitled "Goodrick and Price”.

== Career ==
=== Television and film ===
She began acting in TV roles from the early 1950s onwards including as Theodosia in the Life of Riley television sitcom. Her first major appearance was as the wife of Three Stooges member Larry Fine in the film Husbands Beware. Throughout the 1970s and 1980s, Leonard made television appearances on such shows as Laverne & Shirley, Mork & Mindy, The Facts of Life, Knight Rider and Married... with Children. Leonard also played Aunt Grace in Roseanne Barr's 1987 HBO comedy special The Roseanne Barr Show. Her most memorable was in a recurring role as William Conrad's wise-cracking secretary in Jake and the Fatman. She had small but memorable roles in Starman and Micki + Maude. One of Leonard's visible credits was playing the singing Angel Scribe II in the late 1960s Hallmark television musical special, The Littlest Angel.

=== Theatre ===
She appeared in theatre productions including national tours of Plain and Fancy, Oliver! and Man of La Mancha. Broadway roles included The Happiest Girl in the World, The Gay Life, Drat! The Cat!, Bravo Giovanni and The Pajama Game.

During the 1970s and 1980s she became a regional celebrity in the Los Angeles Theatre circuit for her outrageous portrayal as a lesbian head matron in the play Women Behind Bars.

=== Film and voice ===
In 1982, she appeared as Oliver Warbucks' maid Mrs. Pugh in the film Annie. She also performed voices in the Hanna-Barbera version of the 1990 animated TV series Bill & Ted's Excellent Adventures (1990 TV series), and played Mrs. Chang in the 1990 live-action Aladdin television film.

== Personal life and death ==
Leonard never married or had children. Health problems (including diabetes) eventually set in and she left Hollywood in 1995, living primarily in Oregon. She moved into the Motion Picture Country Home in Woodland Hills, California, where she spent her remaining years. She died of a heart attack on May 14, 2004, at age 77. A bench in the Roddy McDowall garden at the Motion Picture Home has been dedicated in her memory.

== Filmography ==
=== Film and television ===
Year	Title	Role	Notes
1954	My Little Margie	—N/a	Episode: "Health Farm"
1954	The Life of Riley	Thedosia	Episode: "Riley and the Boss' Niece"
1954	The Red Skelton Show	Sister of Mexican Man / Plump Lady in Soda Shop	2 episodes
1954	December Bride	Slim	Episode: "Lily Is Bored"
1955	Husbands Beware	Dora - Larry's Wife	Short film
1955	The Kettles in the Ozarks	Heavy Woman	Uncredited
1962	Route 66	Madame Thornton	Episode: "Only by Cunning Glimpses"
1962; 1963	Car 54, Where Are You?	Mrs. Dobernack / Shopper	2 episodes
1963	The Patty Duke Show	Nurse	Episode: "Double Date"
1969	The Littlest Angel	The Scribe II	Television film
1977	The San Pedro Beach Bums	Nurse Gomez	Episode: "Angels and the Bums"
1978	Last of the Good Guys	Heavy Woman	Television film
1974; 1978	Police Woman	Messenger Lady / The Rich Lady	2 episodes
1979	Mork & Mindy	Lady #1	Episode: "Dr. Morkenstein"
1980	Laverne & Shirley	Dotty	Episode: "Not Quite South of the Border"
1980	Make Me an Offer	Mrs. Gordon	Television film
1982	Annie	Mrs. Pugh	
1983	Buffalo Bill	Joan Seegar	
1983	The Fall Guy	Masseuse	Episode: "TKO"
1984	Knight Rider	Mable	Episode: "Diamonds Aren't a Girl's Best Friend"
1984	We Got It Made	Corky	Episode: "The Break-Up: Part 2"
1984	Legmen	Uncle George	Episode: "Poseidon Indenture"
1984	Cagney & Lacey	The Desk Clerk	Episode: "Matinee"
1984	Faerie Tale Theatre	Mother Toad	Episode: "Thumbelina"
1984	Night Court	Mother Frances	Episode: "The Nun"
1984	Starman	Roadhouse Waitress	
1984	Breakin' 2: Electric Boogaloo	Head Nurse	
1984	Micki & Maude	Nurse Mary Verbeck	
1985	Stand Alone	Mrs. Whitehead	
1985	Tall Tales & Legends	Queen Victoria	
1985	Fraud Squad	—N/a	Television film
1986	Riptide	Bella	Episode: "Dead Men Don't Floss"
1986	The Facts of Life		Episode: "The Apartment"
1986	Pros and Cons	Dolly	Television film
1986	The Jay Leno Show	Herself	Television special
1987	Who's the Boss?	Mrs. Hiller	Episode: "The Way We Was"
1987	The Princess Academy	Fraulein Stinkenschmidt	
1987	She's the Sheriff	Princess Babushka	Episode: "The Golden Streak"
1988	You Can't Hurry Love	Miss Friggit	
1988	My Two Dads	Ethel Baumgartner	
1988	Married... with Children	DeGroot	Episode: "He Thought He Could"
1988	Hooperman	Nurse Jordan	Episode: "Who Do You Truss?"
1987; 1989	Jake and the Fatman	Gertrude Reilly	10 episodes
1990	Shadowzone	Mrs. Cutter	
1990	Growing Pains	Guard	Episode: "Carol in Jail"
1990	Without You I'm Nothing	Ingrid Horn - Sandra's Manager	
1990	Circuitry Man	Juice	
1990	Amen	Heather Fetlock	Episode: "Judge Deacon Frye"
1990	Aladdin	Mrs. Chang	Television film
1991	A Climate for Killing	Winnie	
1991	Dexeil's Class	—N/a	Episode: "The Best Thanksgiving Ever"
1990; 1991	Uncle Buck	Ms. Crappier	3 episodes
1992	Kuffs	Harriet	
1993	Made in America	Sperm Bank Nurse	
1993	Daddy Dearest	Aggie	Episode: "Jaws, Too"
1994	The Nanny	Nanny #2	Episode: "The Nanny-in-Law"
1994	Blank Check	Udowitz	
1995	Get Smart	Nurse Scrum	Episode: "Liver Let Die"
1995	Man of the Year	Dee Dee Sweatman	Final film role
