= Maxine Gates =

American actress (1917–90)

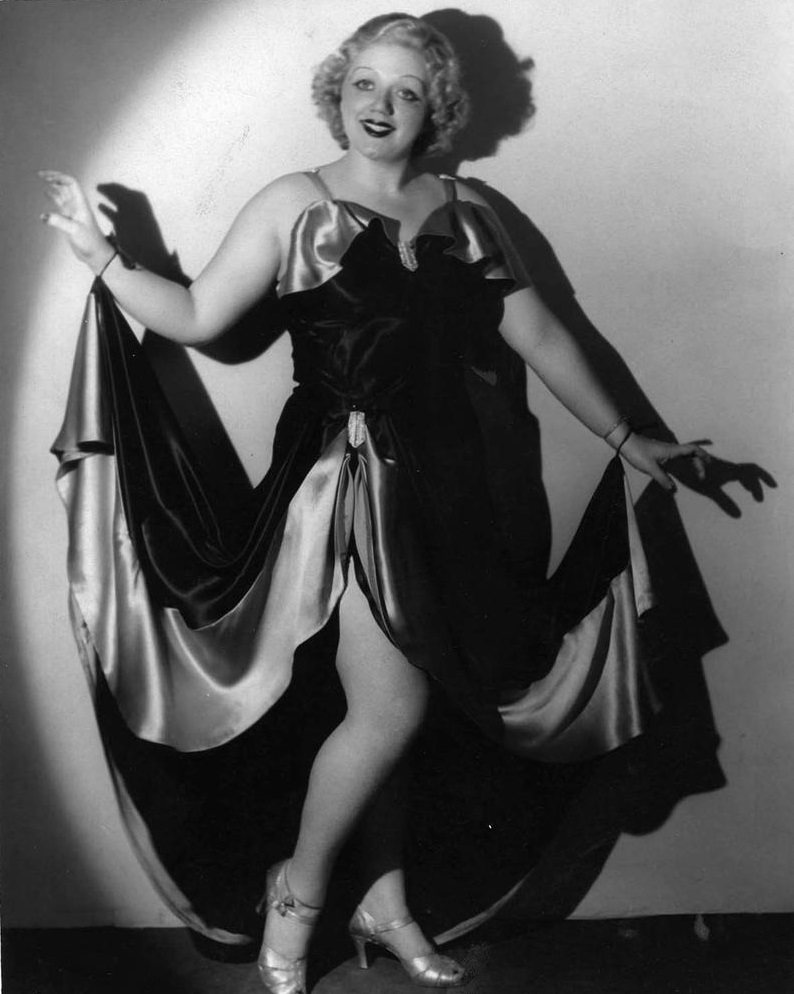
- Born: March 3, 1917; Hebron, Nebraska, U.S.
- Died: July 27, 1990 (aged 73); Los Angeles, California, U.S.
- Other name: Maxine Gates Unland
- Occupation: Actress
- Years active: 1945–1972

Maxine Gates, born on March 3, 1917, and died on July 27, 1990, in Hebron, Nebraska, is an American actress who appeared in over 35 films between 1945 and 1972. She is best known for her appearances in several 1950s-era Three Stooges films such as Goof on the Roof, Husbands Beware and Muscle Up a Little Closer. Due to her rotund figure (reportedly, Gates weighed 250 pounds), she was often cast as a love interest who often intimidated her husband or boyfriend.

During World War II, Gates performed in night clubs and stage shows and was acclaimed for her singing and dancing. In the course of these performances, Gates kissed male audience members on the cheek, and kissed 7,000 men in seven months.

After retiring from acting in 1972, Gates ran a self storage business in the Los Angeles neighborhood of Van Nuys. She died of complications from respiratory disease in the Panorama City neighborhood on July 27, 1990, at the age of 73.

== Filmography ==
Year	Title	Role	Notes
1945	Here Come the Co-Eds	Woman	Uncredited
1946	The Dark Horse	Fat Lady	Uncredited
1947	The Shocking Miss Pilgrim		Uncredited
1947	Living in a Big Way	Babe, Sailor's Wife	Uncredited
1948	My Girl Tisa	Mrs. O'Hoolihan	Uncredited
1948	The Babe Ruth Story	Female Wrestler	Uncredited
1949	Alias Nick Beal	Josie - Fat Floozie in Bar	Uncredited
1949	Red, Hot and Blue	Waitress	Uncredited
1949	Feudin' Rhythm	Fat Actress	Uncredited
1950	A Woman of Distinction	Goldie - Beautician	Uncredited
1950	The Good Humor Man	Fat Customer	Uncredited
1950	Where Danger Lives	Girl in Act	Uncredited
1950	Copper Canyon	Blonde dancer	Uncredited
1951	Bargain Madness	Mrs. Broadbeam	Short, Uncredited
1952	Oklahoma Annie	Tillie	
1952	Blue Canadian Rockies	Chubby Blonde	Uncredited
1953	Houdini	Heavy blonde woman	Uncredited
1954	Red Garters	Townswoman	Uncredited
1955	The Gene Autry Show	Marabelle Carroll	Episode: "Ghost Ranch"
1956	Giant	Waitress at Sarge's	Uncredited
1956	Emergency Hospital	Sylvia Tetlow	Uncredited
1957	Portland Exposé	Slot Machine Jackpot Winner	Uncredited
1957	The Unholy Wife	Nightclub Blues Singer	Uncredited
1961	Rawhide	Fat Lady	S4:E8, "The Prairie Elephant"
1962	National Velvet	Samantha Wells	Episode: "Martha's Beau"
1965	Cat Ballou	Big Woman	Uncredited
1966	Lost in Space	Fat Princess	Episode: "The Thief from Outer Space"
1972	Unholy Rollers	Angie Striker	Alternative title: Leader of the Pack, (final film role)
