= Goof on the Roof =

1953 American short film by Jules White

- Directed by: Jules White
- Written by: Clyde Bruckman
- Produced by: Jules White
- Starring: Moe Howard; Larry Fine; Shemp Howard; Frank Mitchell; Maxine Gates
- Cinematography: Sam Leavitt
- Edited by: Edwin Bryant
- Distributed by: Columbia Pictures
- Release date: December 3, 1953 (U.S.)
- Running time: 16:23
- Country: United States
- Language: English

Goof on the Roof is a 1953 short subject directed by Jules White starring American slapstick comedy team The Three Stooges (Moe Howard, Larry Fine and Shemp Howard). It is the 152nd entry in the series released by Columbia Pictures starring the comedians, who released 190 shorts for the studio between 1934 and 1959.

== Plot ==
The Stooges are informed of their roommate Bill's recent marriage, necessitating their relocation to accommodate his new wife. As a gesture of appreciation, they undertake the installation of Bill's newly acquired television antenna. However, their efforts quickly devolve into chaos, resulting in the destruction of both the television set and the household itself.

The trio's ineptitude extends to basic household maintenance tasks, exemplified by recurring incidents such as Shemp repeatedly plunging headfirst into a bucket of water, prompting humorous confusion among the group members. The kitchen's swinging door proves to be another source of mishap, leading to frequent injuries.

Upon the arrival of the television set, Larry inadvertently misplaces a crucial component down a wall cavity, exacerbating the situation by inadvertently igniting a fire while searching for it. Their attempts to extinguish the flames only worsen the situation, culminating in a series of mishaps involving buckets of water.

Efforts to affix the television antenna to the roof result in Shemp plummeting through the ceiling and landing atop the television set, destroying it beyond repair. When Bill's newlywed wife returns home to discover the chaos, she reacts furiously, prompting Bill to swiftly revert to his single status. In a fit of anger, Bill directs his frustration towards his roommates and kicks them out.

== Cast ==
- Moe Howard as Moe
- Larry Fine as Larry
- Shemp Howard as Shemp
- Frank Mitchell as Bill
- Maxine Gates as Rosebud

== Production notes ==
Goof on the Roof was filmed over the span of November 17–19, 1952. Serving as a remake, it draws inspiration from the films Hog Wild (1930) starring Laurel and Hardy, and Let Down Your Aerial (1949) starring Wally Vernon and Eddie Quillan.

This marked the final original Stooge short authored by Clyde Bruckman; he was hired by The Abbott and Costello Show. However, Bruckman's name continued to be associated with subsequent productions, particularly in instances where reworked films integrated narratives he had contributed to.

Following the conclusion of filming for Goof on the Roof, Shemp Howard experienced a stroke within a fortnight. Despite this setback, he underwent a swift recovery, allowing him to actively participate in the production of the Stooges' subsequent film, Income Tax Sappy which commenced in April 1953.
