= Theodore Lorch =

American actor (1873–1947)

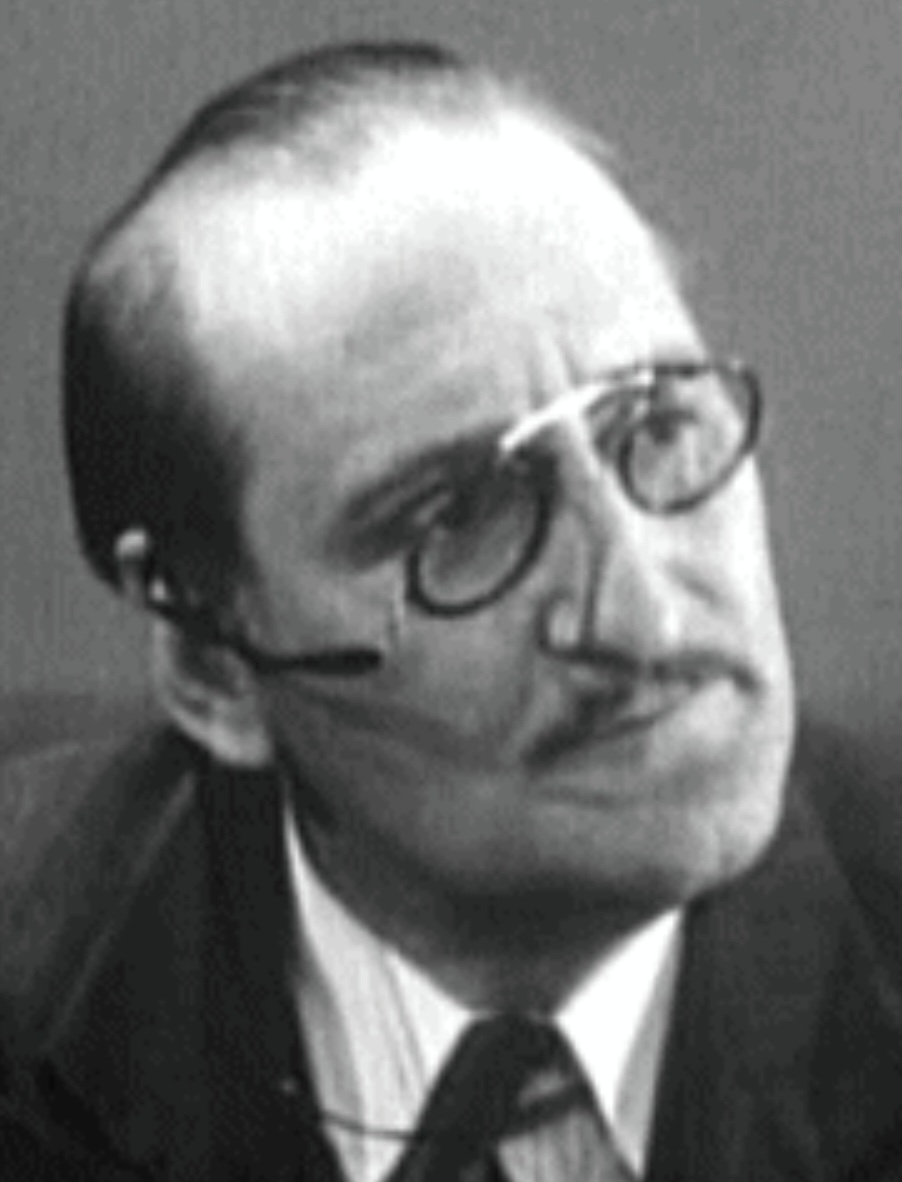
- Lorch in The Sphinx (1933)
- Born: Theodore Lorch; September 29, 1873; Springfield, Illinois, U.S.
- Died: November 12, 1947 (aged 74); Camarillo, California, U.S.
- Resting place: Forest Lawn Memorial Park, Glendale, California
- Occupation: Actor
- Years active: 1908–1947
- Spouse: Cecil Fay (m. 1900; div. 1929)

Theodore Lorch (September 29, 1873 – November 12, 1947) was an American film actor. He appeared in more than 140 films between 1908 and 1947.

== Early years ==
Lorch was born in Springfield, Illinois, in 1873. His father worked for the Illinois Watch Company. When he was a young child he moved with his family to Russia, and he attended school there. After 11 years they returned to Springfield, where he was educated at the McClernand School and Chicken's Business College.

== Career ==
Lorch worked in the office of Illinois's secretary of state. When the Spanish–American War began, he enlsited in Company C Fifth Illinois.

Lorch began the entertainment portion of his career with the Harry Holden Comedy Company. He went on to perform with several stock theater companies and in vaudeville. He organized the Lorch Stock Company that performed in Passaic, New Jersey, from 1910 to 1913. A new theater, the Playhouse, was built for the group's performances. When his company went bankrupt, Lorch sought work in films. By the fall of 1921 Lorch had a stock company based at the Louisiana Theater in New Orleans.

Lorch appeared in several Three Stooges comedies. He was the suspicious Major "Bloodhound" Filbert in Uncivil Warriors, the snooty psychologist Professor Sedlitz in Half-Wits Holiday, and General Muster in Goofs and Saddles. He also performed tiny bit roles, such as the butler in If a Body Meets a Body and Micro-Phonies.

== Personal life and death ==
In October 1921 Lorch announced his intention to settle in New Orleans. He said that after having lived in several cities, "I've quite roaming and it's Theodore Lorch of New Orleans hereafter."

Lorch married actress Cecil Fay in 1900. They separated in 1928, and she was granted a divorce on January 16, 1929. He died on November 12, 1947. His final Stooge film, The Hot Scots, was released posthumously in 1948. He was interred at Forest Lawn Memorial Park, Glendale, California.

== Selected filmography ==
- The Last of the Mohicans (1920) - Chingachgook
- Gasoline Gus (1921) - Dry Check Charlie
- Shell Shocked Sammy (1923)
- Westbound (1924)
- The Sea Hawk (1924) - Turkish Merchant (uncredited)
- Dangerous Pleasure (1924) - Rex Darrow
- Folly of Youth (1925)
- Heir-Loons (1925)
- Manhattan Madness (1925) - Count Von Eckmann
- The Man on the Box (1925) - Mr. Lampton
- Once in a Lifetime (1925) - Tommy
- Where the Worst Begins (1925)
- You're Fired (1925) - Frank LaRue
- Sweet Adeline (1926)
- Unknown Dangers (1926)
- Across the Pacific (1926) - Aguinaldo's Agent
- The Better 'Ole (1926) - Gaspard (uncredited)
- The King of Kings (1927) - (uncredited)
- Tracked by the Police (1927) - 'Bull' Storm
- The Missing Link (1927) - Hunter (uncredited)
- Black Jack (1927) - Sam Vonner
- Sailor Izzy Murphy (1927) - First Mate
- Ginsberg the Great (1927) - Charles Wheeler
- Wild Blood (1928) - Luke Conner
- The Canyon of Adventure (1928) - Don Alfredo Villegas
- The Royal Rider (1929) - Prime Minister
- Show Boat (1929) - Frank (uncredited)
- Spite Marriage (1929) - Actor as 'Union Officer' (uncredited)
- Free and Easy (1930) - Himself - Dynamite Scene Director (uncredited)
- The Runaway Bride (1930) - Dr. C. Kent (uncredited)
- Whoopee! (1930) - Indian (uncredited)
- A Lady's Morals (1930) - Audience Member Socked by Paul (uncredited)
- Son of India (1931) - Tour Guide (uncredited)
- The Montana Kid (1931) - Larson's Bartender (uncredited)
- The Galloping Ghost (1931, Serial) - The Crippled Stranger
- Grief Street (1931) - 'Pop', Newspaper City Editor (uncredited)
- The Sin of Madelon Claudet (1931) - Felix - the Headwaiter (uncredited)
- The Lightning Warrior (1931, Serial) - Pierre La Farge
- Single-Handed Sanders (1932) - Sheriff Murray (uncredited)
- Arsène Lupin (1932) - Lupin's Butler (uncredited)
- The Tenderfoot (1932) - An Actor (uncredited)
- Honor of the Mounted (1932) - Henchman
- The Texas Bad Man (1932) - Jim - Henchman (uncredited)
- Broadway to Cheyenne (1932) - New York Doctor (uncredited)
- The King Murder (1932) - Dr. Stern, Coroner (uncredited)
- Cowboy Counsellor (1932) - State's Attorney - Replaced Gordon DeMain (uncredited)
- The Man from Arizona (1932) - Bartender
- Man of Action (1933) - Bartender (uncredited)
- Gabriel Over the White House (1933) - Delegate to the Debt Conference (uncredited)
- Black Beauty (1933) - Bledsoe, the Veterinary
- The Whirlwind (1933) - Red - Bartender (uncredited)
- The Girl in 419 (1933) - Examination Doctor (uncredited)
- The Return of Casey Jones (1933) - Dr. Wallace (uncredited)
- The Gallant Fool (1933) - Rainey
- The Sphinx (1933) - Dr. Augustus Kelton (uncredited)
- Gambling Ship (1933) - Gambler (uncredited)
- The Fugitive (1933) - Parker
- The Road to Ruin (1934) - Abortion Doctor (uncredited)
- A Modern Hero (1934) - Ringmaster (uncredited)
- Blue Steel (1934) - Townsman (uncredited)
- Monte Carlo Nights (1934) - Gambler (uncredited)
- Friends of Mr. Sweeney (1934) - Gambler (uncredited)
- The Count of Monte Cristo (1934) - Citizen (uncredited)
- The Tonto Kid (1934) - Sam Creech - Lawyer
- The Affairs of Cellini (1934) - Executioner (uncredited)
- Two Heads on a Pillow (1934) - Member of the Jury (uncredited)
- We Live Again (1934) - Guard in Courtyard (uncredited)
- Jealousy (1934) - Minor Role (uncredited)
- Gunfire (1934) - Ross McGregor
- The Mysterious Mr. Wong (1934) - Wong Henchman Thrown Into Pit (uncredited)
- The Mighty Barnum (1934) - Bartender (uncredited)
- The Drunkard (1935) - Lawyer Squire Gribbs
- Reckless (1935) - Member of Coroner's Jury (uncredited)
- The Desert Trail (1935) - Robbed Stage Passenger (uncredited)
- Uncivil Warriors (1935, Short) - Maj. 'Bloodhound' Filbert (uncredited)
- Hold 'Em Yale (1935) - Pullman Conductor (uncredited)
- Rustler's Paradise (1935) - Rance Kimball, alias El Diablo
- Vagabond Lady (1935) - Dock Official (uncredited)
- Mad Love (1935) - Actor at Party (uncredited)
- Call of the Wild (1935) - Dawson Townsman (uncredited)
- His Fighting Blood (1935) - A. Leslie, the Jeweler
- Barbary Coast (1935) - Helmsman (uncredited)
- The Last Days of Pompeii (1935) - Slaver (uncredited)
- The New Frontier (1935) - Joe
- Annie Oakley (1935) - Wild West Show Announcer (uncredited)
- The Shadow of Silk Lennox (1935) - Kennedy - Ward-Heeler
- Black Gold (1936) - Wooden Derrick Bartender (uncredited)
- Flash Gordon (1936, Serial) - High Priest #2 [Chs. 8-11, 13]
- The Fugitive Sheriff (1936) - Rally Speaker (uncredited)
- Romance Rides the Range (1936) - Jonas Allen
- The President's Mystery (1936) - Townsman (uncredited)
- Aces Wild (1936) - Kelton
- Rebellion (1936) - General Vallejo
- Rip Roarin' Buckaroo (1936) - Trainer Todd Knapp (uncredited)
- Two Minutes to Play (1936) - Tim - Bartender
- Come and Get It (1936) - Lumberjack (uncredited)
- Cheyenne Rides Again (1937) - Rollins
- Blake of Scotland Yard (1937) - Daggett - the Butler
- Dick Tracy (1937, Serial) - Patorno [Chs. 1, 12]
- Marked Woman (1937) - 2nd Juror #2 (uncredited)
- The Cherokee Strip (1937) - Jury Member (uncredited)
- Orphan of the Pecos (1937) - Prof. Jeremiah Mathews
- Goofs and Saddles (1937, Short) - Gen. Muster (uncredited)
- Lost Ranch (1937) - Henchman Merkle
- The Toast of New York (1937) - Man at Opera (uncredited)
- Confession (1937) - Man in Court (uncredited)
- Idol of the Crowds (1937) - Man with Irwin at Bar (uncredited)
- Madame X (1937) - Pawnbroker (uncredited)
- Alcatraz Island (1937) - First Trial Fixed Juror (uncredited)
- Maid's Night Out (1938) - Headwaiter (uncredited)
- Kentucky Moonshine (1938) - First Buckboard Driver (uncredited)
- The Fighting Devil Dogs (1938, Serial) - 'Wing' Henchman (uncredited)
- Professor Beware (1938) - Railroad Worker (uncredited)
- I Am the Law (1938) - Clerk (uncredited)
- Red River Range (1938) - Rancher (uncredited)
- Stand Up and Fight (1939) - Henchman (uncredited)
- Stagecoach (1939) - Lordsburg Express Agent (uncredited)
- We Want Our Mummy (1939, Short) - Thug in Mummy Outfit (uncredited)
- Buck Rogers (1939, Serial) - Kane's Council Member (uncredited)
- Zorro's Fighting Legion (1939, Serial) - Councilman Carlos (uncredited)
- The Hunchback of Notre Dame (1939) - Minor Role (uncredited)
- The Lady in Question (1940) - Juror (uncredited)
- Bad Man of Deadwood (1941) - Businessman (uncredited)
- Nine Lives Are Not Enough (1941) - City Room Worker (uncredited)
- Jesse James at Bay (1941) - Townsman (uncredited)
- The Remarkable Andrew (1942) - Jurist (uncredited)
- Butch Minds the Baby (1942) - Susie's Neighbour (uncredited)
- The Pride of the Yankees (1942) - Neighbor Leaning Through Window (uncredited)
- The Glass Key (1942) - Dinner Guest (uncredited)
- Bowery at Midnight (1942) - Tramp Playing Checkers at Friendly Mission (uncredited)
- Hello, Frisco, Hello (1943) - Barfly at Sharkey's (uncredited)
- Spook Louder (1943, Short) - Mr. Graves (uncredited)
- This Land Is Mine (1943) - Juror (uncredited)
- If a Body Meets a Body (1945, Short) - Jerkington, the Butler
- The Hoodlum Saint (1946) - Minor Role (uncredited)
- Badman's Territory (1946) - Citizen's Committee Member (uncredited)
- Deception (1946) - Well-wisher at Concert (uncredited)
- Half-Wits Holiday (1947, Short) - Prof. Sedletz
- My Brother Talks to Horses (1947) - Spectator at Racetrack (uncredited)
- Body and Soul (1947) - Man at Weigh-in (uncredited)
- Here Comes Trouble (1948) - Extra (uncredited)
- The Hot Scots (1948, Short) - MacPherson, the Butler (final film role)
- Scotched in Scotland (1954, Short) - McPherson (archive footage)
