= Phony Express =

1943 film by Del Lord

- Directed by: Del Lord
- Written by: Monte Collins; Elwood Ullman
- Produced by: Del Lord; Hugh McCollum
- Starring: Moe Howard; Larry Fine; Curly Howard; Bud Jamison; Ernie Adams; Sally Cleaves; Joel Friedkin; Snub Pollard; Chester Conklin; Victor Travers; Gwen Seager; Shirley Patterson
- Cinematography: John Stumar
- Edited by: Paul Borofsky
- Distributed by: Columbia Pictures
- Release date: November 18, 1943 (U.S.)
- Running time: 17:09
- Country: United States
- Language: English

Phony Express is a 1943 short subject directed by Del Lord starring American slapstick comedy team The Three Stooges (Moe Howard, Larry Fine and Curly Howard). It is the 75th entry in the series released by Columbia Pictures starring the comedians, who released 190 shorts for the studio between 1934 and 1959.

== Plot ==
The town of Peaceful Gulch is under attack by bandits and thugs. The mayor devises a plan to scare them out of town by creating a false report of the arrival of three dedicated marshals, using a picture from a wanted poster for three vagrants (the Stooges, whose bounties are set at .50 cents apiece or 3 for $1.00). Despite this, the boys are almost chased out of the town themselves after nearly poisoning the town's sheriff, who is suffering from lumbago, by concocting a miracle medicine. The Stooges enter a saloon where they confront the leader of the thugs, who tries to placate them with drink and dance, but is soon informed of the ruse. Testing Curly's marksmanship, the trio successfully outwit them and escape.

The sheriff finally puts them in charge of guarding the bank, which gets robbed while their backs are turned. To avoid being hanged, the Stooges search the area, with Curly as the bloodhound. After momentarily getting sidetracked by hunting a skunk, Curly taking the hide for a hat, the Stooges eventually discover the stolen money, just as the gang returns to the cabin they stashed it in. Through a series of mishaps, Curly ends up in a stove with the money, however, as Red lights a fire inside it accidentally, the flames igniting Curly's bandolier, sending bullets flying and scattering the outlaws.

== Production notes ==
Phony Express was filmed on March 27–31, 1943. The film title is a parody of the "Pony Express," a fast mail service that crossed the North American continent from Saint Joseph, Missouri to Sacramento, California from April 1860 to October 1861. Some of the plot and minimal stock footage would be recycled in Merry Mavericks.

This was the last Three Stooges short co-written by Monte Collins, who died on June 1, 1951.

== Cast ==
- Moe Howard as Moe
- Larry Fine as Larry
- Curly Howard as Curly
- Shirley Patterson as Lola
- Bud Jamison as Red Morgan
- Ernie Adams as the Banker
- Sally Cleaves as Dancing Partner
- Chester Conklin as Mr. Higgins
- Thomas Judge "Tex" Cooper as Barfly
- Joel Friedkin as Dr. Abdul
- Joe Garcio as a Henchman
- George Gray as a Messenger
- Herman Hack as a Dancer
- Ray Jones as Red's Henchman
- John Merton as Red's Henchman
- George Morrell as a Townsman
- Snub Pollard as Sheriff Hogwaller
