= Herbert Evans (actor) =

British actor (1882–1952)

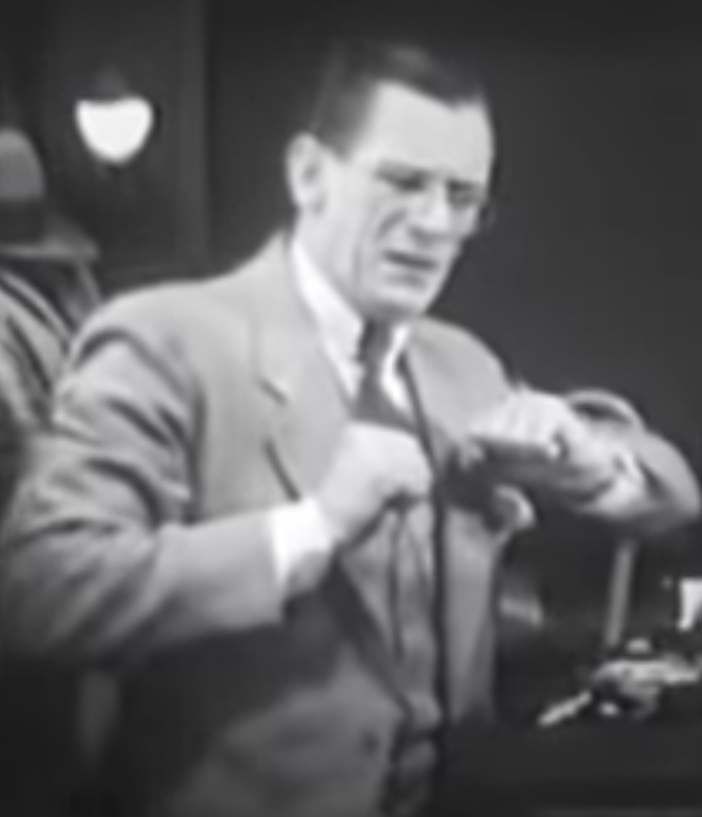
- Evans in One Year Later (1933)
- Born: 16 April 1882; Devonshire, England
- Died: 10 February 1952 (aged 69); San Gabriel, California, U.S.
- Resting place: Chapel of the Pines Crematory
- Occupation: Actor
- Years active: 1908–1952
- Spouse: Etta Maud Bignell (m. 1903)
- Children: 2

Herbert Evans (16 April 1882 – 10 February 1952) was an English film actor. He appeared in over 180 films between 1916 and 1952.

== Biography ==
A native of Devonshire, Evans started his screen acting career in 1914 at the World Film Company in Fort Lee, New Jersey.

His performances include the Earl of Glenheather Castle in The Three Stooges comedy The Hot Scots and its remake Scotched in Scotland, the well-meaning but clueless butler Wilkes in Vagabond Loafers and in the Our Gang short Shrimps for a Day.

In addition to his work in short subjects, Evans appeared—often uncredited—in such films as Casablanca, Strangers on a Train, Annie Get Your Gun and Song of the Thin Man. He also had bit roles in the Shirley Temple vehicles Curly Top and Wee Willie Winkie.

One notable departure from his professional pursuit of acting consisted of time spent as "amusement manager" of Coney Island's Luna Park—specifically, 1920 through at least 1924, and again in 1928 and 1929. It was during the latter stint that Evans engaged fellow British ex-pat Cary Grant—two years prior to acquiring that soon-to-be iconic stage name–to become, in the words of the former Mr. Leach, circa fall 1969, "a barker for an incubator sideshow." Even before his hiring had been announced, Evans made headlines in March 1920 with a $50,000 payment to the United States government in exchange for the newly decommissioned USS Recruit, which was promptly moved from Manhattan's Union Square to Luna Park, where it served as an ad hoc ballroom/bandstand for opening-day patrons and the U.S. Naval Recruiting Band.

Evans died on 10 February 1952 in the San Gabriel Sanitarium. He was survived by his wife Etta and two children.

== Selected filmography ==
- Where Love Leads (1916)
- The Heart of a Hero (1916)
- The Wild Girl (1917)
- Who Loved Him Best? (1918)
- The Third Degree (1919)
- The Place of Honeymoons (1920)
- The Devil Dancer (1927)
- Beyond London Lights (1928)
- The Naughty Duchess (1928)
- The Woman Who Dared (1933)
- Ship of Wanted Men (1933)
- Service with a Smile (1934)
- The Widow from Monte Carlo (1935)
- And Sudden Death (1936)
- High Flyers (1937)
- Saleslady (1938)
- Everybody's Doing It (1938)
- The Dawn Patrol (1938)
- The Rains Came (1939)
- Sherlock Holmes and the Voice of Terror (1942)
- Appointment in Berlin (1943)
- The Gang's All Here (1943)
- Ladies of Washington (1944)
- A Fig Leaf for Eve (1944)
- The Fabulous Suzanne (1946)
- Jiggs and Maggie in Society (1947)
