= Feudin' Rhythm =

1949 film by Edward Bernds

- Theatrical release poster
- Directed by: Edward Bernds
- Written by: Barry Shipman
- Produced by: Colbert Clark
- Starring: Eddy Arnold; Gloria Henry; Kirby Grant; Isabel Randolph; Tommy Ivo; Fuzzy Knight; Carolina Cotton
- Cinematography: Fayte M. Browne
- Edited by: Paul Borofsky
- Production company: Columbia Pictures
- Distributed by: Columbia Pictures
- Release date: November 3, 1949
- Running time: 65 minutes
- Country: United States
- Language: English

Feudin' Rhythm is a 1949 American Western film directed by Edward Bernds and written by Barry Shipman. The film stars Eddy Arnold, Gloria Henry, Kirby Grant, Isabel Randolph, Tommy Ivo, Fuzzy Knight and Carolina Cotton. The film was released on November 3, 1949, by Columbia Pictures.

== Cast ==
- Eddy Arnold as Eddy Arnold
- Gloria Henry as Valerie Kay
- Kirby Grant as Ace Lucky
- Isabel Randolph as Lucille Upperworth
- Tommy Ivo as Bobby Upperworth
- Fuzzy Knight as Horseshoe
- Carolina Cotton as Carolina Cotton
- Dick Elliott as Charles Chester Upperworth
- Maxine Gates as Madam Kerphew
- John Dehner as Gregory Biddleton
- Emil Sitka as Viele Smielie
- Jason Robards Sr. as Mr. Rushman
- George Lloyd as Sheriff Hogan
- Gene Roth as Policeman
- John Cason as Pete
