= All Gummed Up =

1947 American short film by Jules White

- Directed by: Jules White
- Written by: Felix Adler
- Produced by: Jules White
- Starring: Moe Howard; Larry Fine; Shemp Howard; Christine McIntyre; Emil Sitka; Cy Schindell; Victor Travers; Symona Boniface; Al Thompson
- Cinematography: Allen G. Siegler
- Edited by: Edwin H. Bryant
- Distributed by: Columbia Pictures
- Release date: December 18, 1947 (U.S.)
- Running time: 18:17
- Country: United States
- Language: English

All Gummed Up is a 1947 short subject directed by Jules White starring American slapstick comedy team The Three Stooges (Moe Howard, Larry Fine and Shemp Howard). It is the 103rd entry in the series released by Columbia Pictures starring the comedians, who released 190 shorts for the studio between 1934 and 1959.

== Plot ==
The Stooges operate a local drugstore whose cantankerous landlord, the elderly Amos Flint, informs them their lease is about to expire. Larry protests that the trio have had their establishment for a decade and do not want to leave. However, their bickering takes a poignant turn when they encounter Flint's long-suffering wife, Cerina, who is subjected to his harsh treatment.

Moved by Cerina's plight, the Stooges offer her shelter in their store's spare room, igniting a chain of events driven by Shemp's inventive idea to create a "Fountain of Youth" serum. The trio fervently concoct the serum in their lab, aiming to restore Cerina's youthfulness. Despite initial setbacks, their efforts eventually yield success as Cerina undergoes a remarkable transformation.

With Cerina rejuvenated, the Stooges navigate a comedic exchange with Amos, who is astounded by his wife's newfound beauty. In a surprising turn, Amos rescinds his eviction threat and even transfers the store's deed to the Stooges in exchange for a dose of the serum. However, the serum's effect on Amos is dire: he regresses into infancy.

Amidst the chaos, Cerina celebrates her youthfulness by preparing a Marshmallow Jumbo layer cake. Through a mishap, bubble gum is substituted for marshmallows in making the cake, and the ensuing festivities culminate in involuntary bubble-blowing by the Stooges and Cerina.

== Cast ==
=== Credited ===
- Moe Howard as Moe
- Larry Fine as Larry
- Shemp Howard as Shemp
- Emil Sitka as Amos Flint
  - Norman Ollestad as Baby Amos
- Christine McIntyre as Cerina Flint
  - Florence Lake as elderly Cerina Flint

=== Uncredited ===
- Cy Schindell as Man with prescription
- Victor Travers as Bubblegum customer
- Symona Boniface as Woman who loses her dress
- Al Thompson as Fountain pen customer
- Judy Malcolm as Light bulb customer
- Michael Towne as Fishing rod customer
- Dian Fauntelle as Unnamed woman (deleted scene)

== Production notes ==
All Gummed Up was filmed from April 23–24, 1947. It was remade in 1953 as Bubble Trouble, using ample recycled footage from the original. Although Stooge critic Jon Solomon contends that the remake has a better story flow than the original, that sentiment is not shared by fans.

This entry is one of the few to present the trio as competent and respectable professionals, as opposed to inadequate blue-collar laborers.
