= She Learned About Sailors =

1934 film by George Marshall

- Directed by: George Marshall
- Written by: William M. Conselman; Henry Johnson; Clyde Bruckman (contributing writer, uncredited)
- Produced by: John Stone
- Starring: Alice Faye; Lew Ayres; Frank Mitchell
- Cinematography: Harry Jackson
- Edited by: Fred Allen
- Music by: David Buttolph
- Production company: Fox Film Corporation
- Distributed by: Fox Film Corporation
- Release date: June 29, 1934
- Running time: 78 minutes
- Country: United States
- Language: English

She Learned About Sailors is a 1934 American musical comedy film directed by George Marshall and starring Alice Faye, Lew Ayres and Frank Mitchell. It was produced and distributed by Fox Film. Songs for the film were written by Richard A. Whiting and Sidney Clare.

== Plot ==
A nightclub singer in Shanghai falls in love with an American sailor.

== Cast ==
- Lew Ayres as Larry Wilson
- Alice Faye as Jean Legoi
- Harry Green as Jose Pedro Alesandro Lopez Rubinstein
- Frank Mitchell as Peanuts
- Jack Durant as Eddie
- Russ Clark as Jack - Marine
- Edward LeSaint as Justice of the Peace
- Jimmy Conlin as Irate Neighbor
- Al Hill as Departing Sailor
- Susan Fleming as Departing Sailor's Girlfriend
- June Lang as Girl at Dance Hall
- Eddie Lee as Rickshaw Driver
- Allen Jung as Rickshaw Driver
- Charles Sullivan as Sailor
- Gay Seabrook as Stenographer

== Bibliography ==
- Bradley, Edwin M. Hollywood Musicals You Missed: Seventy Noteworthy Films from the 1930s. McFarland, 2020.
- Fetrow, Alan G. Sound films, 1927-1939: a United States Filmography. McFarland, 1992.
- Solomon, Aubrey. The Fox Film Corporation, 1915-1935: A History and Filmography. McFarland, 2011.
