= Sam McDaniel =

American actor (1886–1962)

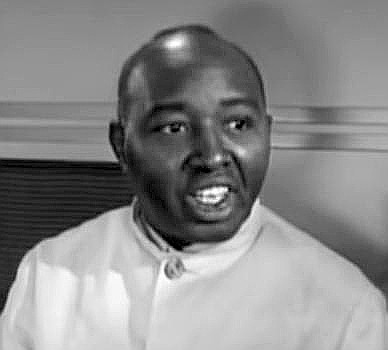
- McDaniel in Broadway Limited (1941)
- Born: Samuel Rufus McDaniel; January 28, 1886; Wichita, Kansas, U.S.
- Died: September 24, 1962 (aged 76); Los Angeles, California, U.S.
- Other names: Sam Deacon McDaniel; Deacon McDaniels; Sam McDaniels
- Years active: 1929–1960
- Relatives: Hattie McDaniel (sister); Etta McDaniel (sister)

Samuel Rufus McDaniel (January 28, 1886 – September 24, 1962) was an American actor who appeared in over 210 television shows and films between 1929 and 1950. He was the older brother of actresses Etta McDaniel and Hattie McDaniel.

== Early life ==
Born in Wichita, Kansas, to former slaves, McDaniel was one of 13 children. His father Henry McDaniel fought in the Civil War with the 122nd USCT and his mother, Susan Holbert, was a singer of gospel music. In 1900, the family moved to Colorado, living first in Fort Collins and then in Denver where he grew up and graduated from Denver East High School. The children of the McDaniel family had a traveling minstrel show. After the death of brother Otis in 1916, the troupe began to lose money. In 1931, McDaniel found work in Los Angeles with sisters Hattie, Etta and Orlena. Sam was working on KNX radio program called The Optimistic Doughnut Hour, and he was able to get his sister a spot.

== Career ==
McDaniel almost exclusively played butler, doormen, valet, porter and servant roles in films.

He played Doc, the competent ship's cook, in the Oscar-winning 1937 film Captains Courageous. He played Deacon in "All Through the Night" A Humphrey Bogart film from 1942. He also played Spiffingham the Butler in the Three Stooges film Heavenly Daze (1948). He is the only African-American to ever appear on I Love Lucy, playing "Sam the Porter" in the 1955 episode "The Great Train Robbery". He appeared uncredited as a waiter on a train in both the 1947 film The Egg and I (with Fred MacMurray and Claudette Colbert) and its first followup Ma and Pa Kettle (1949). He also played various supporting roles on TV's The Amos 'n' Andy Show (1951–53).

== Death ==
McDaniel died of throat cancer on September 24, 1962, in Woodland Hills, Los Angeles, California
