= Frank Mitchell (actor) =

Actor

- Frank Mitchell in She Learned About Sailors 1934
- Born: May 13, 1905; New York City, U.S.
- Died: January 21, 1991 (aged 85); North Hollywood, California, U.S.
- Occupation: Actor
- Years active: 1920–1980
- Spouse: Jane Fields (Gilbert) (m. 1926; died 1979)
- Children: 2

Frank Mitchell (May 13, 1905 – January 21, 1991) was an American film actor. He appeared in over 70 films between 1920 and 1980.

== Career ==
Frank Mitchell was a short, stocky, mischievous-looking comic and acrobat who got his start in entertainment by entering contests imitating Charles Chaplin. From there he broke into Vaudeville with a comedy acrobatic troupe and later toured with the International Seven in Europe. Aside from the stage, Mitchell also worked circuses performing stunts on horses as a trick rider. It was in the Vaudeville circuit that he met comic Jack Durant. The two formed the comedy duo "Mitchell & Durant," which appeared in The Earl Carroll Vanities of 1931. Their success also led them in to films, most notably providing comic relief in several Alice Faye musicals such as She Learned About Sailors, 365 Nights in Hollywood and Music Is Magic.

After Mitchell and Durant split, Mitchell found minor comedy roles throughout the 1940s and 1950s films. Because of his experience as a trick-rider, Mitchell found himself working in several westerns. One of his more famous characters was in a series of Westerns for Columbia Pictures playing the role of "Cannonball" (originally played by Dub Taylor). As television became more prevalent, Mitchell transitioned to smaller and often uncredited parts on television shows such as The Lucy-Desi Comedy Hour and The Red Skelton Hour. During this time in his career he was usually playing gangsters and straight-man roles. His last picture was a television movie titled Miracle of the Heart: A Boys Town Story in which he played a police officer.

== The Three Stooges ==
In 1943, Mitchell appeared in an unofficial team alongside Three Stooges alumni Fred Sanborn and Shemp Howard in the Universal feature Crazy House.

In 1953, he appeared with the Three Stooges in the Columbia short Spooks! and Goof on the Roof (both 1953), this time not as a member of the Stooges but rather as a foil for the trio's antics.

In 1970, The Three Stooges were side-lined due to Larry Fine suffering a debilitating stroke. When a movie commitment with long time stooge supporting player Emil Sitka as a replacement fell through due to lack of financing, Moe's wife convinced him to retire due to his age. With Moe's permission, Curly-Joe DeRita lined up Mitchell and Mousie Garner to appear in an act known as "The New Three Stooges". They fared very poorly in attracting a crowd, and quickly disappeared.

== Personal life and death ==
Mitchell was born in New York City. He was married to Jane Fields from 1926 until her death in 1979. They had two children. Mitchell retired from films in 1980, and died of cardiac arrest on January 21, 1991, at age 85.
