= Midshipman Jack =

1933 film by Christy Cabanne

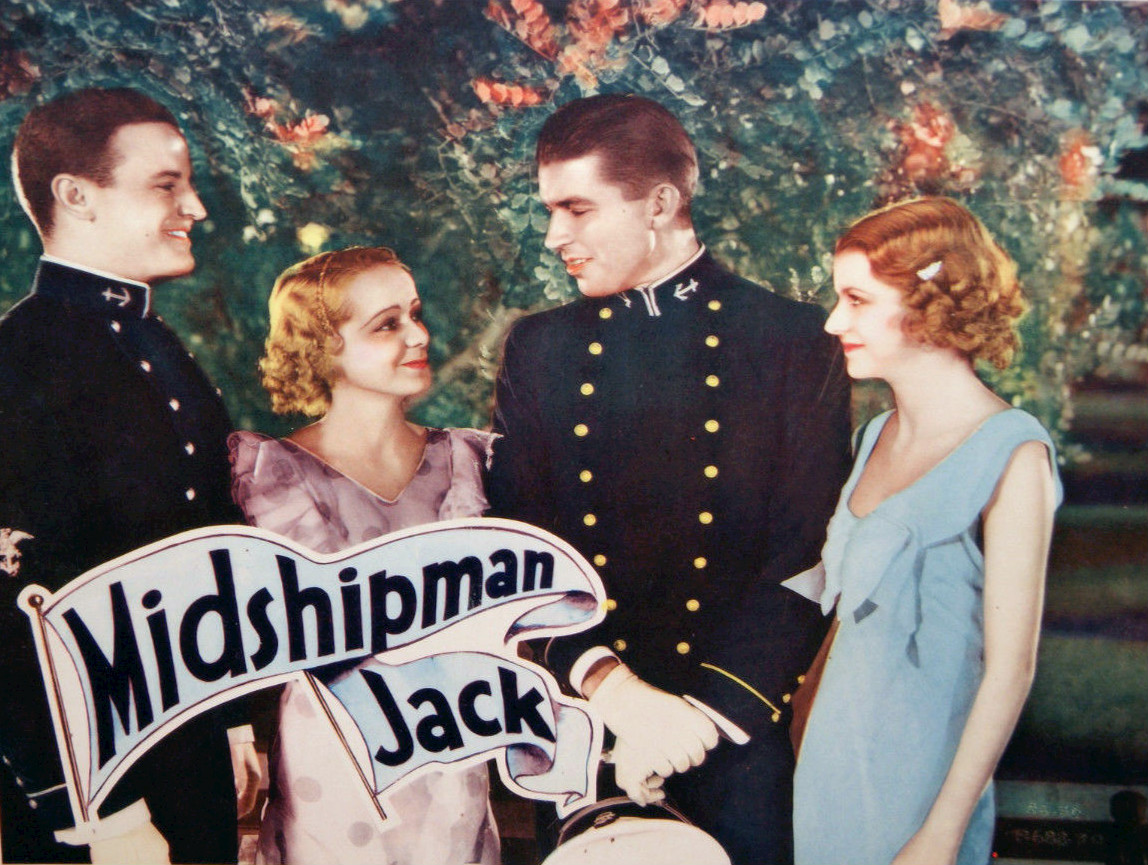
- Lobby card
- Directed by: Christy Cabanne; Tommy Atkins (assistant)
- Screenplay by: Frank Wead; F. McGrew Willis
- Produced by: Merian C. Cooper
- Starring: Bruce Cabot; Betty Furness; Frank Albertson; Arthur Lake; Florence Lake
- Cinematography: Alfred Gilks; Nicholas Musuraca
- Edited by: Basil Wrangell
- Music by: Max Steiner
- Production company: RKO Pictures
- Distributed by: RKO Pictures
- Release date: September 22, 1933
- Running time: 71 minutes
- Country: United States
- Language: English

Midshipman Jack is a 1933 American pre-Code action film directed by Christy Cabanne and written by Frank Wead and F. McGrew Willis. The film stars Bruce Cabot, Betty Furness, Frank Albertson, Arthur Lake, and Florence Lake. The film was released on September 22, 1933, by RKO Pictures.

== Cast ==
- Bruce Cabot as Jack Austin
- Betty Furness as Ruth Rogers
- Frank Albertson as Russell H. Burns
- Arthur Lake as Allen S. Williams
- Florence Lake as Sally Withers
- John Darrow as Clark Simpson
- Purnell Pratt as Captain Rogers
- Margaret Seddon as Mrs. Burns
