= Scotched in Scotland =

1954 American short film by Jules White

- Directed by: Jules White; Edward Bernds (stock footage)
- Written by: Jack White; Elwood Ullman (stock footage)
- Produced by: Jules White
- Starring: Moe Howard; Larry Fine; Shemp Howard; Philip Van Zandt; Christine McIntyre; Herbert Evans; Charles Knight; Ted Lorch
- Cinematography: Ray Cory
- Edited by: Jules White
- Distributed by: Columbia Pictures
- Release date: November 4, 1954 (U.S.)
- Running time: 15:35
- Country: United States
- Language: English

Scotched in Scotland is a 1954 short subject directed by Jules White starring American slapstick comedy team The Three Stooges (Moe Howard, Larry Fine and Shemp Howard). It is the 158th entry in the series released by Columbia Pictures starring the comedians, who released 190 shorts for the studio between 1934 and 1959.

== Plot ==
The Stooges are detective school graduates who are shipped off to Scotland. Adorned in kilts and adopting contrived Scottish accents, the Stooges, adopting the aliases McMoe, McLarry, and McShemp, assuming the responsibility of safeguarding the esteemed possessions housed within the precincts of Glenheather Castle, under the auspices of The Earl. Unbeknownst to them, the castle's staff are complicit in a scheme to pilfer its treasures, taking advantage of the Stooges' presence as they slumber within its walls.

However, the Stooges ultimately apprehend the perpetrators, led by the nefarious Lorna Doone, who, under the guise of the Earl's secretary, orchestrates the clandestine operation. Their triumph is ephemeral as, amidst their jubilation, they encounter a bagpipe-playing skeletal apparition, prompting their hasty departure from the castle premises.

== Cast ==
=== Credited ===
- Moe Howard as Moe
- Larry Fine as Larry
- Shemp Howard as Shemp
- Christine McIntyre as Lorna Doone
- Phil Van Zandt as Dean O. U. Gonga
- Charles Knight as Angus

=== Uncredited ===
- Herbert Evans as The Earl of Glenheather (stock footage)
- Ted Lorch as McPherson (stock footage)
  - George Pembroke as McPherson (new footage)
- Jules White as Skeleton

== Production notes ==
Scotched in Scotland is a remake of 1948's The Hot Scots (1948), employing extensive recycled footage from its predecessor. In an effort to enhance the film's eerie atmosphere, a whistling, howling wind-like sound was incorporated into the soundtrack, a departure from the original rendition.

George Pembroke doubles for the late Ted Lorch in new scenes; Lorch died in November 1947. New footage was filmed on January 19–20, 1954.

References to a Gillette advertising slogan are also featured several times using a parrot and a skeleton. The slogan, "How are you fixed for blades?", began in 1952 using the Gillette mascot, Sharpie the Parrot.
