= Bubble Trouble (film) =

1953 film by Jules White

- Directed by: Jules White
- Screenplay by: Jack White
- Story by: Felix Adler
- Produced by: Jules White
- Starring: Moe Howard; Larry Fine; Shemp Howard; Emil Sitka; Christine McIntyre
- Cinematography: Ray Cory
- Edited by: Edwin H. Bryant
- Distributed by: Columbia Pictures
- Release date: October 8, 1953 (U.S.)
- Running time: 16:30
- Country: United States
- Language: English

Bubble Trouble is a 1953 short subject directed by Jules White starring American slapstick comedy team The Three Stooges (Moe Howard, Larry Fine and Shemp Howard). It is the 151st entry in the series released by Columbia Pictures starring the comedians, who released 190 shorts for the studio between 1934 and 1959.

== Plot ==
The Stooges, proprietors of a local drug store facing lease expiration due to the obstinate landlord Amos Flint, witness his maltreatment of his elderly wife Cerina. Moved by Cerina's plight, the Stooges offer her refuge in their shop's rear quarters. Inspired by Cerina's desire to regain her lost youth, Shemp concocts a "Fountain of Youth" elixir, leading to Cerina's transformation into a stunning beauty. However, a mishap involving bubble gum instead of marshmallows adds a comedic twist to their celebration.

When Amos encounters Cerina's rejuvenated state, he reconsiders his eviction threat but inadvertently transforms into a gorilla after overdosing on the elixir. Subdued by the Stooges, Amos is confined, prompting the trio to entertain the idea of exhibiting him as a talking gorilla. Moe's suggestion to amplify their profits by transforming Shemp leads to a humorous finale with Moe mimicking gorilla behavior.

== Cast ==
=== Credited ===
- Shemp Howard as Shemp
- Larry Fine as Larry
- Moe Howard as Moe
- Emil Sitka as Amos Flint
- Christine McIntyre as Cerina Flint

=== Uncredited ===
- Victor Travers as Bubble Gum Customer

== Production notes ==
Bubble Trouble serves as a remake of All Gummed Up (1947), incorporating extensive stock footage. Filming for the new footage took place on October 13, 1952, nearly a year prior to the film's release.

Stooge critic Jon Solomon highlights a more cohesive plot structure in this rendition compared to the original All Gummed Up. However, diverging opinions exist among film historians observing that several new scenes feel contrived and unnatural, typical of director Jules White's rapid adaptation of existing footage. Unlike the original, where the climax occurs approximately four minutes before the film's conclusion, Bubble Trouble presents the bubblegum cake scene preceding the climax. Notably, both the original and the remake were helmed by director Jules White.
