= The Canyon of Adventure =

1928 film directed by Albert S. Rogell

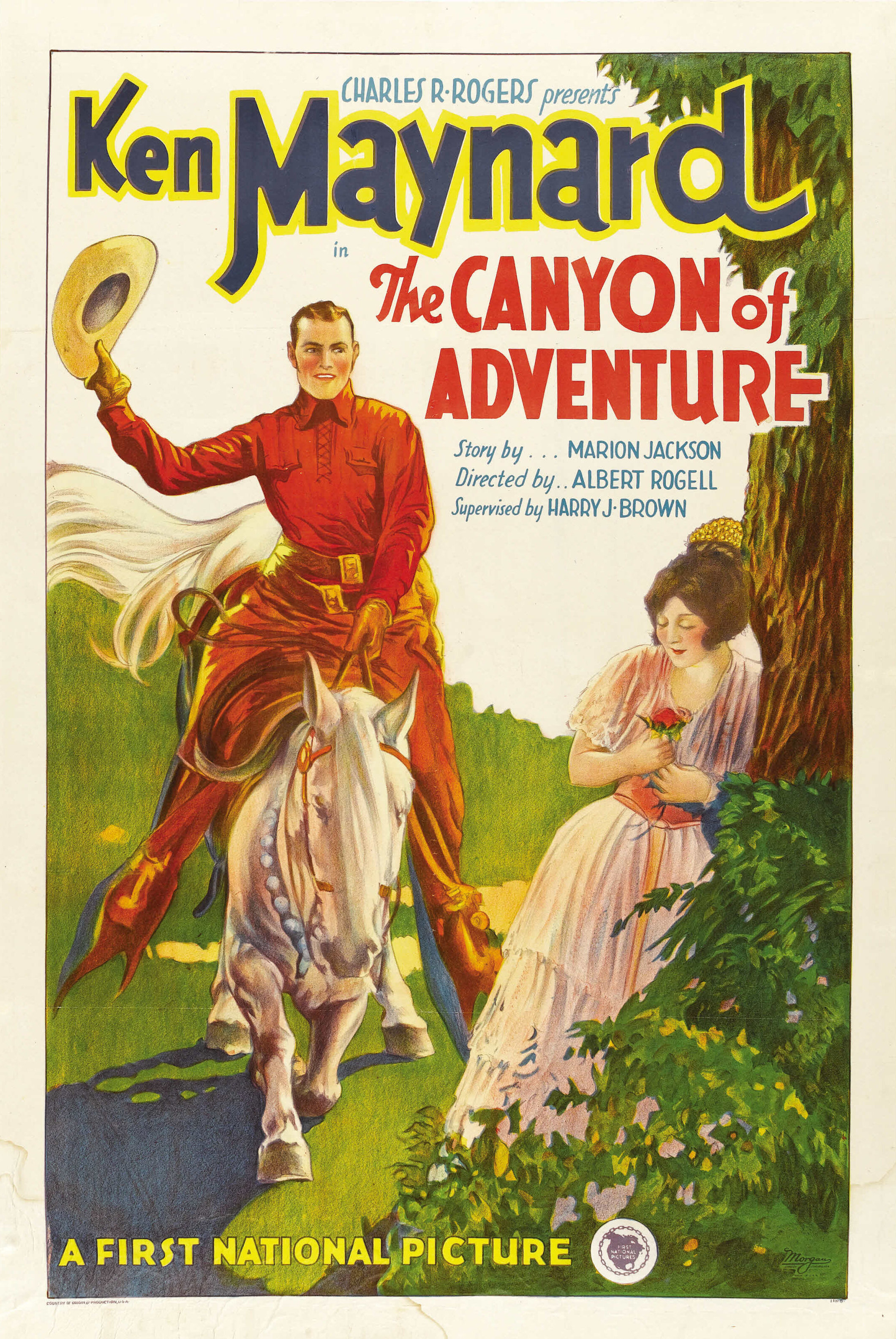
- Theatrical release poster
- Directed by: Albert S. Rogell
- Screenplay by: Marion Jackson; Ford Beebe
- Story by: Marion Jackson
- Starring: Ken Maynard; Virginia Brown Faire; Eric Mayne; Theodore Lorch; Tyrone Brereton; Hal Salter
- Cinematography: Ted McCord
- Edited by: Fred Allen
- Production company: Charles R. Rogers Productions
- Distributed by: First National Pictures
- Release date: April 22, 1928
- Running time: 60 minutes
- Country: United States
- Languages: Silent; English intertitles

The Canyon of Adventure is a 1928 American silent Western film directed by Albert S. Rogell and written by Marion Jackson and Ford Beebe. The film stars Ken Maynard, Virginia Brown Faire, Eric Mayne, Theodore Lorch, Tyrone Brereton and Hal Salter. The film was released on April 22, 1928, by First National Pictures.

== Cast ==
- Ken Maynard as Steven Bancroft
- Virginia Brown Faire as Dolores Castanares
- Eric Mayne as Don Miguel Castanares
- Theodore Lorch as Don Alfredo Villegas
- Tyrone Brereton as Luis Villegas
- Hal Salter as Jake Leach
- Billy Franey as Buzzard Koke
- Slim Whitaker as Slim Burke
- Tarzan as Tarzan

== Preservation ==
With no holdings located in archives, The Canyon of Adventure is considered a lost film.
