= Crash Goes the Hash =

1944 film by Jules White

- Directed by: Jules White
- Written by: Felix Adler
- Produced by: Jules White
- Starring: Moe Howard; Larry Fine; Curly Howard; Bud Jamison; Dick Curtis; Symona Boniface; Vernon Dent; Victor Travers
- Cinematography: George Meehan
- Edited by: Charles Hochberg
- Distributed by: Columbia Pictures
- Release date: February 4, 1944 (U.S.)
- Running time: 17:36
- Country: United States
- Language: English

Crash Goes the Hash is a 1944 short subject directed by Jules White starring American slapstick comedy team The Three Stooges (Moe Howard, Larry Fine and Curly Howard). It is the 77th entry in the series released by Columbia Pictures starring the comedians, who appeared in 190 shorts at the studio between 1934 and 1959.

== Plot ==
Fuller Bull, the beleaguered chief of the failing Daily News, chides his hired reporters for failing to secure a story to rival that of their competitor, the Daily Star Press. Mistakenly identifying three tradesmen as journalists from the rival publication, Bull promptly recruits them to procure a photograph of visiting dignitary Prince Shaam of Ubeedarn, who is rumored to be planning nuptials with local socialite Mrs. Van Bustle. Disguised as servants, the trio infiltrates a party at Mrs. Van Bustle's residence held in honor of the prince.

The Stooges unintentionally disturb the event by presenting hors d'œuvres that are deemed unappetizing, featuring dog biscuits accompanied by canned peas (erroneously perceived as canapés), and a turkey housing a live parrot within its cavity. Outraged, the prince departs, trailed by the majordomo, Lord Flint. Undeterred, the Stooges uncover the true identities of both the prince and his aide as criminals plotting a robbery.

Subsequently, the Stooges report to Bull that the purported Prince Shaam is an imposter, leading to the arrest of him and Flint. Delighted by this revelation, Bull halts production to include an extra edition of the paper, rewarding the trio handsomely for their efforts. Grateful for their intervention, Mrs. Van Bustle decides to marry Curly as a gesture of appreciation for foiling Shaam's robbery scheme.

== Cast ==
=== Credited ===
- Moe Howard as Moe
- Larry Fine as Larry
- Curly Howard as Curly
- Dick Curtis as Prince Shaam of Ubeedarn
- Bud Jamison as Lord Flint the majordomo
- Vernon Dent as Fuller Bull

=== Uncredited ===
- Symona Boniface as Mrs. Van Bustle
- Judy Malcolm as Fuller Bull's secretary/party guest in white dress
- Victor Travers as Party guest with mashed potatoes
- Beatrice Blinn as Party guest with spilled lemonade
- Ida Mae Johnson, Elise Grover, Jay Eaton, Harold Miller, Robert Brister as Additional party guests
- Johnny Kascier, Charlie Phillips, John Tyrrell, Wally Rose as Bruised newshawks

== Production notes ==
Crash Goes the Hash was filmed October 11–13, 1943. It would be supporting actor Bud Jamison's final appearance in a Stooge film. A Type 2 diabetic in his later years, Jamison appeared in 16 more films before his untimely death in September 1944. A devout Christian Scientist, he died on September 30, 1944, at age 50 after refusing treatment for kidney cancer.

At one point, Jamison gently breaks the fourth wall by comparing the boys to "The Three Stooges," to which they naturally take offense.

The parrot's "Jeepers creepers! What a night!" exclamation combines the 1930s slang euphemism from "Jesus Christ" (made into the Johnny Mercer 1938 song "Jeepers Creepers, Where'd You Get Those Peepers?") and the parrot's "What a night!' from the Stooges' 1936 entry Disorder in the Court.

Even though the story and screenplay is credited to Felix Adler, this film borrows considerable dialogue, situations, and even shot set-ups from the 1937 Columbia Short New News, starring Monte Collins and Tom Kennedy, which was written by Al Giebler, Elwood Ullman and Searle Kramer.

=== Curly Howard fades ===
The Stooges made many public appearances during the height of World War II in support of the war effort. The demands of the heavy touring took their toll on Curly, whose timing and energy began to deteriorate. In Crash Goes the Hash, Curly's speech is slightly slower and his falsetto had begun to lose its crisp high pitch. The dialogue spoken at the lemonade table where he covertly tells Larry to take a picture of Prince Shaam features Curly talking in his normal speaking voice, which is noticeably deeper than Moe's or Larry's.

== See also ==
- List of American films of 1944
