= G.I. Wanna Home =

1946 film by Jules White

- Columbia Pictures tagged Moe and Larry's names incorrectly on this one-sheet for G.I. Wanna Home.
- Directed by: Jules White
- Written by: Felix Adler
- Produced by: Jules White
- Starring: Moe Howard; Larry Fine; Curly Howard; Judy Malcolm; Ethelreda Leopold; Doris Houck; Symona Boniface; Al Thompson
- Cinematography: George F. Kelley
- Edited by: Edwin H. Bryant
- Distributed by: Columbia Pictures
- Release date: September 5, 1946 (U.S.)
- Running time: 15:54
- Country: United States
- Language: English

G.I. Wanna Home is a 1946 short subject directed by Jules White starring American slapstick comedy team The Three Stooges (Moe Howard, Larry Fine and Curly Howard). It is the 94th entry in the series released by Columbia Pictures starring the comedians, who released 190 shorts for the studio between 1934 and 1959.

== Plot ==
Following their discharge from military service at the conclusion of World War II, the Stooges return home with aspirations of marrying their respective fiancées. However, their plans are thwarted as they find themselves without accommodation or financial resources.

The trio embarks on a futile search for lodging, encountering numerous setbacks before reluctantly settling for makeshift quarters in an open lot. Their attempts at domesticity are marred by a series of comedic mishaps, including Curly's misguided use of a vacuum cleaner as a lawnmower, resulting in a chaotic explosion of debris.

Further complications arise when the Stooges' endeavors to retrieve eggs from a bird's nest lead to inadvertent destruction, and a hapless struggle with a rifle culminates in the accidental procurement of bird meat. Their culinary efforts are worsened by the intrusion of a mischievous parrot, which adds to their woes. The Stooges are driven out by a farmer, riding a tractor, who demolishes the furnishings without warning.

Subsequently, the trio endeavors to construct a rudimentary dwelling with their limited resources, culminating in the creation of a diminutive apartment comprising cramped living quarters, a compact kitchen, and a modest sleeping area furnished with bunk beds. Despite their ineptitude, the Stooges persevere in their attempts to establish a semblance of domesticity amidst the chaos.

== Cast ==
=== Credited ===
- Moe Howard as Moe
- Larry Fine as Larry
- Curly Howard as Curly
- Judy Malcolm as Tessie
- Ethelreda Leopold as Jessie
- Doris Houck as Bessie

=== Uncredited ===
- Symona Boniface as Landlady
- Al Thompson as Hobo
- Richard Kening as Landlord
- William Gordon as Man on tractor
- Jerry Kingstone as Cop (deleted scenes)
- Dee Smith as Housewife (deleted scenes)

== Production notes ==
G.I. Wanna Home is often inadvertently referred to as 'G.I. Wanna Go Home.' In the scene where the eggs fall from the tree on Moe's face, faint laughter can be heard apparently from a production member.

=== Curly's illness ===
G.I. Wanna Home was filmed from March 22–26, 1946, towards the end of Curly Howard's career. The 42-year-old comedian had experienced a series of minor strokes several months prior to filming, resulting in unpredictable performances. By the time G.I. Wanna Home was produced, Curly had lost a significant amount of weight, and lines had appeared on his previously smooth face. While director Edward Bernds devised methods to accommodate Curly's illness, Jules White shifted the focus of the action towards Larry. For example, the scene in which Larry climbs a tree to retrieve eggs from a bird's nest was originally intended for Curly. Additionally, Curly was no longer able to ad lib on camera as he had in previous performances. His scene cleaning potatoes appears sluggish and lethargic. Films such as Playing the Ponies (1937), An Ache in Every Stake (1941), Sock-a-Bye Baby (1942), and I Can Hardly Wait (1943) are exemplary instances of Curly effortlessly preparing food and showcasing his comedic talent.
