= 365 Nights in Hollywood =

1934 film by George Marshall

- Directed by: George Marshall
- Written by: William M. Conselman; Henry Johnson
- Based on: 365 Nights in Hollywood by Jimmy Starr
- Produced by: Sol M. Wurtzel
- Starring: James Dunn; Alice Faye; Frank Mitchell
- Cinematography: Harry Jackson
- Music by: Samuel Kaylin
- Production company: Fox Film Corporation
- Distributed by: Fox Film Corporation
- Release date: December 10, 1934
- Running time: 77 minutes
- Country: United States
- Language: English

365 Nights in Hollywood is a 1934 American Pre-Code musical comedy film directed by George Marshall and starring Alice Faye, James Dunn and Frank Mitchell. It was based on a collection of short stories of the same title by columnist Jimmy Starr, published in 1926. It was produced and distributed by Fox Film.

The film was thought lost until 2016, when it was rediscovered by Faye biographer W. Franklin Moshier.

The film, a Fox production, is described by Jane Elder as a "low-budget B movie".

== Plot ==
A failed film director has to accept a job teaching at an acting academy. He soon discovers that one of his pupils, Alice Perkins, is a gifted singer. He persuades a wealthy backer to put up the money to make a film starring her. However complications ensue from a love rival in Alice's new leading man, and a plan by embezzlers to steal the film's budget.

== Cast ==
- James Dunn as James 'Jimmy' Dale
- Alice Faye as Alice Perkins
- Frank Mitchell as Percy
- Jack Durant as Clarence
- John Bradford as Adrian Almont
- Grant Mitchell as J. Walter Delmar
- John Qualen as Prof. Herman Ellenbogen
- Frank Melton as Frank Young
- Paul Schwegler as Tarzan
- Tyler Brooke as Casting Director
- Ethel Wales as Mrs. Lipke
- Jimmy Conlin as Heeber, Student Actor
- Frank Sully as Mr. Sully, Student Actor
- Addison Richards as Assistant D.A.
- Helen Gibson as Student Actress
- Dennis O'Keefe as Dancing Boy
- Blanca Vischer as Spanish Girl
- Lynn Bari as Showgirl

== Production ==
The film was shot at the old Fox studio in Hollywood.

== Reception ==
The film received mixed reviews at the time. It is generally remembered in contemporary sources for Faye's participation and for the songs, including "Yes to You".

== Bibliography ==
- Bradley, Edwin M. Hollywood Musicals You Missed: Seventy Noteworthy Films from the 1930s. McFarland, 2020.
- Fetrow, Alan G. Sound films, 1927-1939: a United States Filmography. McFarland, 1992.
- Solomon, Aubrey. The Fox Film Corporation, 1915-1935: A History and Filmography. McFarland, 2011.
