= Merry Mavericks =

1951 film by Edward Bernds

- Directed by: Edward Bernds
- Written by: Edward Bernds
- Produced by: Hugh McCollum
- Starring: Moe Howard; Larry Fine; Shemp Howard; Don C. Harvey; Marion Martin; Emil Sitka; Paul Campbell
- Cinematography: Allen G. Siegler
- Edited by: Edwin H. Bryant
- Distributed by: Columbia Pictures
- Release date: September 6, 1951 (U.S.)
- Running time: 15:49
- Country: United States
- Language: English

Merry Mavericks is a 1951 short subject directed by Edward Bernds starring American slapstick comedy team The Three Stooges (Moe Howard, Larry Fine and Shemp Howard). It is the 133rd entry in the series released by Columbia Pictures starring the comedians, who released 190 shorts for the studio between 1934 and 1959.

== Plot ==
Set in the Old West, the Stooges are wanted for vagrancy, in order to escape custody, Moe suggests they leave for a town known as Peaceful Gulch. Meanwhile, the once-tranquil town of Peaceful Gulch faces turmoil as the notorious Red Morgan and his gang intimidate the populace and drive out the sheriff. In a bid to restore law and order, members of the sheriff's posse devise a plan to deceive Morgan and his cohorts by fabricating the arrival of three renowned marshals.

The Stooges unwittingly become entangled in this scheme when they are mistaken for the legendary lawmen. Tasked with thwarting Morgan's efforts to plunder a stash of money, the cash is hidden with the Stooges in an old house believed to be haunted. According to an old story from years back, a Native American chief was murdered after a man named Jeff Horton decapitated the chief by blasting his head off with his shotgun; the chief's ghost is said to haunt the old house, searching for his missing head.

Larry and Shemp are initially scared after hearing the story, but Moe convinces them that ghosts and specters aren't real. So the trio embarks on their mission. However, while Moe and Shemp are in the other room, Larry encounters the headless ghost, while the others run into a whole gaggle of ghosts. Upon investigating, they discover that the ghostly apparitions haunting the premises is merely a disguise worn by one of Morgan's associates.

Seizing the opportunity, Shemp subdues the impostor and assumes the guise himself. Reuniting with Moe and Larry, who have fallen into Morgan's clutches, Shemp employs his ruse to rescue them. With swift action and comedic flair, Shemp incapacitates Morgan's gang using a hatchet, thereby emerging as the unlikely hero of the day, and restoring order to Peaceful Gulch.

== Production notes ==
Merry Mavericks was filmed June 13–16, 1950, but not released until September 1951. It is a partial remake of Phony Express, using minimal stock footage from the original.
