= Muscle Up a Little Closer =

1957 film by Jules White

- Columbia Pictures made an error by listing the Stooges as "Shemp (who had died in November 1955), Larry and Joe," omitting Moe entirely.
- Directed by: Jules White
- Written by: Felix Adler
- Produced by: Jules White
- Starring: Moe Howard; Larry Fine; Joe Besser; Maxine Gates; Ruth Godfrey; Harriette Tarler; Matt Murphy
- Cinematography: Irving Lippman
- Edited by: Harold White
- Distributed by: Columbia Pictures
- Release date: February 28, 1957
- Running time: 16:46
- Country: United States
- Language: English

Muscle Up a Little Closer is a 1957 short subject directed by Jules White starring American slapstick comedy team The Three Stooges (Moe Howard, Larry Fine and Joe Besser). It is the 176th entry in the series released by Columbia Pictures starring the comedians, who released 190 shorts for the studio between 1934 and 1959.

== Plot ==
Moe, Larry, and Joe find themselves on the brink of proposing marriage to their respective beloveds. However, their plans are disrupted when they discover that the engagement ring intended for Joe's fiancée has been stolen. Suspicions fall upon Elmo, a robust colleague employed at their workplace. Determined to retrieve the ring, the Stooges confront Elmo in the company gymnasium. Their attempt to reclaim the ring through physical coercion proves ineffective, resulting in Moe and Larry being rendered unconscious.

In a surprising turn of events, Joe's fiancée demonstrates remarkable fortitude, overpowering Elmo and reclaiming the stolen ring, thereby ensuring the continuation of their engagement.

== Production notes ==
Filmed on June 27–29, 1956, Muscle Up a Little Closer was the first film to feature Moe and Larry's more "gentlemanly" haircuts, first suggested by Joe Besser. However, these had to be used sparingly, as most of the shorts with Besser were remakes of earlier films, and new footage had to be matched with old.

The title of the film parodies the Otto Harbach/Karl Hoschna 1908 song "Cuddle up a Little Closer, Lovey Mine".
