= Half-Wits Holiday =

1947 film by Jules White

- Directed by: Jules White
- Written by: Zion Myers
- Produced by: Jules White
- Starring: Moe Howard; Larry Fine; Curly Howard; Emil Sitka; Vernon Dent; Barbara Slater; Ted Lorch; Symona Boniface
- Cinematography: George F. Kelley
- Edited by: Edwin H. Bryant
- Distributed by: Columbia Pictures
- Release date: January 9, 1947 (U.S.)
- Running time: 17:42
- Country: United States
- Language: English

Half-Wits Holiday is a 1947 short subject directed by Jules White starring American slapstick comedy team the Three Stooges (Moe Howard, Larry Fine and Curly Howard in his final starring role). It is the 97th entry in the series released by Columbia Pictures starring the comedians, who released 190 shorts for the studio between 1934 and 1959.

== Plot ==
In the second Stooge adaptation of the 1913 play Pygmalion by George Bernard Shaw, the Stooges find themselves entangled in a wager between two psychologists, Professors Quackenbush and Sedletz, who seek to transform the repairmen into gentlemen through environmental influence. Amidst the tumultuous training process, marked by comedic misadventures and the Stooges' amorous escapades with Professor Quackenbush's daughter Lulu, the stakes escalate toward a decisive test of their refined behavior at an upscale society gathering.

However, the anticipated soirée descends into chaos as the Stooges' innate antics disrupt decorum with inadvertent calamity. Curly's misjudged attempts at etiquette culminate in a pie-flinging debacle, symbolizing both his departure from the stage as a Stooge and a comedic foreshadowing of impending misfortune. Moe's nervous reaction to the looming presence of Mrs. Smythe-Smythe, inadvertently likened to the Sword of Damocles, triggers a slapstick sequence culminating in a pie fight.

== Cast ==
=== Credited ===
- Moe Howard as Moe
- Larry Fine as Larry
- Curly Howard as Curly
- Vernon Dent as Prof. Quackenbush
- Barbara Slater as Lulu Quackenbush
- Ted Lorch as Prof. Sedletz

=== Uncredited ===
- Emil Sitka as Sappington
- Symona Boniface as Mrs. Smythe-Smythe
- Mary Forbes as Countess Shpritzvasser
- Helen Dickson as Mrs. Gotrocks
- Al Thompson as Mr. Toms
- Johnny Kascier as Councilman
- Victor Travers as Sleeping party guest
- Judy Malcolm as Party guest

== Production notes ==
Half-Wits Holiday is a reworking of 1935's Hoi Polloi, without the aid of any stock footage. Half-Wits Holiday would itself later be reworked as 1958's Pies and Guys.

The untimely absence of Curly from the pie fight would prove somewhat helpful when pie-fight footage was later needed. The footage was recycled in Pest Man Wins, Scheming Schemers and Pies and Guys, as well as the compilation feature film Stop! Look! and Laugh!.

=== Curly Howard's departure ===
Half-Wits Holiday was filmed on May 2–6, 1946; this production marked the final appearance of Curly Howard as an official member of the Three Stooges. On the last day of filming (May 6), Curly suffered a debilitating stroke on set and was immediately transported to a nearby hospital, effectively terminating his career.

Curly was originally intended to play a significant role in the pie-fight scene. However, after Moe discovered him with his head slumped on his chest, unable to speak, and tears streaming down his face, it became evident that Curly was in no shape to perform. Moe immediately informed director Jules White of Curly's unfortunate condition, prompting White to quickly revise the scene to redistribute Curly's parts between Moe and Larry. Additionally, reaction shots from the supporting cast were inserted more frequently to obscure Curly's absence.

Supporting actor Emil Sitka, who debuted with the Stooges in this film as first footman Sappington, recounted:

After (the stroke) occurred, Curly was just missing all of a sudden. It wasn't announced to the rest of the cast; nobody knew what happened. So, we're approaching the last scene in the picture, a big pie fight. They had a big set and they put a huge canvas all around; it was going to be like a battleground. They're getting all geared up and the script calls for all the Stooges. I see a dry run-through of the scene and there's no Curly. I thought it was just a change in the script. No one — including Moe, Larry and Jules — ever told us how serious his condition was. It was only after the picture had been completed that I found out he took ill.

Even before the day Curly suffered his debilitating stroke, he had been experiencing difficulties following White's direction during filming. Many of Curly's lines were either reassigned to Larry or eliminated altogether.

In the scene where the Stooges undergo reflex checks at the beginning of the short, an ailing Curly can be seen looking off-camera towards director Jules White, ostensibly for cues on when to move or deliver his next line. To alleviate his struggles, Curly was frequently positioned next to his brother, Moe, who assisted him through the scenes. One particular scene, in which the Stooges were to comport themselves as refined gentlemen and articulate eloquently when introduced to the affluent gentry, took significantly longer to film due to Curly's health issues.

- Larry: "Delighted."
- Moe: "Devastated."
- Curly: "Dilapidated."

- Larry: "Enchanted."
- Moe: "Enraptured."
- Curly: "Embalmed."

White later said, "I had a devil of a time getting that scene. Curly just couldn't get the hang of it. I should have realized then that he was deteriorating even further."
