= Heavenly Daze =

- Directed by: Jules White
- Written by: Zion Myers
- Produced by: Jules White
- Starring: Moe Howard; Larry Fine; Shemp Howard; Vernon Dent; Sam McDaniel; Victor Travers; Symona Boniface; Marti Sheldon; Judy Malcolm
- Cinematography: Allen Siegler
- Edited by: Edwin Bryant
- Distributed by: Columbia Pictures
- Release date: September 2, 1948 (U.S.)
- Running time: 17:00
- Country: United States
- Language: English

Heavenly Daze is a 1948 short subject directed by Jules White starring American slapstick comedy team The Three Stooges (Moe Howard, Larry Fine, and Shemp Howard). It is the 109th entry in the series released by Columbia Pictures starring the comedians, who released 190 shorts for the studio between 1934 and 1959.

== Plot ==
In a celestial realm, Shemp converses with his Uncle Mortimer, who is engaged in a telephone discussion regarding Shemp's potential placement in Heaven or Hell. Concerns arise over the behavior of cousins Moe and Larry, prompting Uncle Mortimer to entrust Shemp with the task of reforming them to secure his own access to Heaven. Shemp accepts, satisfied with the condition that he remains imperceptible to Earth's inhabitants.

Meanwhile, on Earth, Moe and Larry attend the reading of Shemp's will with their legal representative, I. Fleecem. Discontent ensues when Shemp's modest bequest falls short of Fleecem's fee. However, Shemp clandestinely retrieves the funds, briefly leading Moe and Larry to entertain the notion of his spectral presence.

Subsequently, Moe and Larry embark on an elaborate and fraudulent schemes soliciting financing from the wealthy DePuysters for the production of novelty fountain pens. Shemp's intervention thwarts their machinations, albeit inadvertently instigating a calamitous fire.

The narrative then transitions back to the setting of Shemp's bedroom, revealing the preceding events to be an allegorical dream sequence. However, the dream's symbolic implications manifest in reality as Shemp finds himself in imminent peril due to his negligent behavior of falling asleep while smoking. Following the extinguishment of the conflagration, Shemp recounts his dreamlike experience to Moe and Larry, prompting a comically anticlimactic response from his cousins in the form of a cream pie assault and a sardonic offering of writing implements.

== Cast ==
=== Credited ===
- Moe Howard as Moe and Uncle Mortimer
- Larry Fine as Larry
- Shemp Howard as Shemp
- Vernon Dent as I. Fleecem
- Sam McDaniel as Spiffingham

=== Uncredited ===
- Marti Shelton as Miss Jones
- Judy Malcolm as Heavenly switchboard operator
- Victor Travers as Mr. DePeyster (final film)
- Symona Boniface as Mrs. DePeyster
- Jules White as Heavenly Train announcer (voice)
- Brian O'Hara as Gunslinger

== Production notes ==
Heavenly Daze was filmed on June 23–26, 1947; it was remade in 1955 as Bedlam In Paradise, using ample stock footage. The title is a play on "heavenly days," a popular catch-phrase from radio program Fibber McGee and Molly.

In the 1940s, the supernatural fantasy film genre trope of the departed coming back to assist the living was popular one to use in film, such as in Here Comes Mr Jordan, A Matter of Life and Death, Wonder Man, It’s A Wonderful Life, and Columbia's Mr. Jordan sequel Down to Earth. The Tom and Jerry series also reworked parts of Heavenly Daze the following year in Heavenly Puss.

Larry asks why anyone would want a fountain pen that would write under whipped cream. Moe responds that people might be in a desert where they would not be able to write under water. This refers to the first ball point pen being introduced by Milton Reynolds in 1945 that was a bestseller. It was sold for $10 with the slogan "It writes under water."

Among the stops the train to Earth makes is Cucamonga. This is a reference to the famous running gag on The Jack Benny Program in which a train stops at "Anaheim, Azusa and Cuc.....amonga."

A gag in the film's script called for a fountain pen to be thrown into the middle of Larry's forehead. The pen was to be thrown on a wire and into a small hole in a tin plate fastened to Larry's head. However, due to a miscalculation on the part of the special effects department, the sharp pen point punctured Larry's skin, leaving a gash in his forehead. In a fit of rage, Moe chased director Jules White around the set because White had promised that the gag would be harmless.
