= Hollywood Party =

Hollywood Party may refer to:

- Hollywood Party (1934 film), a musical starring Jimmy Durante
- Hollywood Party, a 1937 Charley Chase Technicolor short unseen for nearly 60 years until the soundtrack disc was rediscovered in 2000
- Hollywood Party, an alternate title for The Party, a 1968 comedy written and directed by Blake Edwards and starring Peter Sellers
