= We Want Our Mummy =

1939 film by Del Lord

- Directed by: Del Lord
- Written by: Searle Kramer; Elwood Ullman
- Produced by: Jules White
- Starring: Moe Howard; Larry Fine; Curly Howard; Dick Curtis; Bud Jamison; James C. Morton; Eddie Laughton; Ted Lorch; John Tyrrell
- Distributed by: Columbia Pictures
- Release date: February 24, 1939 (U.S.)
- Running time: 16:27
- Country: United States
- Language: English

We Want Our Mummy is a 1939 comedy thriller short subject, directed by Del Lord starring American slapstick comedy team The Three Stooges (Moe Howard, Larry Fine and Curly Howard). It is the 37th entry in the series released by Columbia Pictures starring the comedians, who released 190 shorts for the studio between 1934 and 1959. The film marks the final appearance of James C. Morton in this film series.

In the film, the Stooges are depicted as private detectives. Two museum curators hire them to locate an Egyptologist who disappeared in Cairo, and to retrieve the pharaoh's mummy which the Egyptologist had located before his disappearance. In Egypt, the detectives have to face both a criminal gang and a living mummy.

== Plot ==
Museum of Ancient History curators Dr. Powell and Professor Wilson enlist the Stooges' services as private detectives to locate Professor Tuttle, an Egyptologist who has gone missing while in pursuit of the mummy of Egyptian King Rootentooten in Cairo. Tasked with retrieving the mummy, the Stooges embark on a perilous journey, driven by the promise of a substantial reward.

Upon arrival in Egypt, the Stooges encounter a series of misadventures, exacerbated by their naivety and ineptitude. Mistaking a mirage for a body of water, they stumble into a network of tunnels purportedly leading to the tomb of Rootentooten. However, their exploration leads to unintended consequences, including a harrowing encounter with a living mummy.

Subsequently, the Stooges discover Professor Tuttle being held captive by a group of thieves. Complicating matters further, they accidentally destroy what they believe to be the mummy of Rootentooten. Faced with the threat of imminent demise at the hands of the malevolent gang leader, Jackson, who believes that the jewels buried inside the mummy of Rootentooten, the Stooges devise a comically ingenious plan to deceive their captors, involving Curly masquerading as a makeshift mummy.

During a tumultuous showdown between the Stooges and the criminals, it is discovered that the mummy inadvertently destroyed by the Stooges is not that of Rootentooten, but rather his diminutive wife, Queen Hotsy-Totsy. The unexpected discovery prompts a hasty retreat, with the Stooges and Professor Tuttle narrowly escaping the clutches of danger, only to encounter yet another obstacle in the form of an alligator.

== Cast ==
=== Credited ===
- Moe Howard as Moe / Radio Announcer
- Larry Fine as Larry
- Curly Howard as Curly

=== Uncredited ===
- Dick Curtis as Jackson
- Bud Jamison as Dr. Powell
- Ted Lorch as Thug in Mummy Outfit
- Eddie Laughton as Cab Driver
- James C. Morton as Prof. Wilson
- John Tyrell as Thug in Egyptian Garb
- Robert B. Williams as Prof. Tuttle

== Production notes ==
We Want Our Mummy was filmed on November 1–4, 1938. It is the first Stooge film to employ "Three Blind Mice" as the Stooges' official theme song (the song also appeared somewhat prematurely in 1938's Flat Foot Stooges, due to some confusion in that film's release date). This version of "Three Blind Mice," often known as the "sliding strings" version, would be used regularly up to and including 1942's What's the Matador?. An alternate version of the 'sliding strings' version would be used for a brief period starting with 1945's If a Body Meets a Body.

We Want Our Mummy marks the final appearance of co-star James C. Morton, who died on October 24, 1942.

The reference to the 1938 World Series between the New York Yankees and Chicago Cubs is a rare acknowledgement of a real-life sporting event.
