= Doris Houck =

American actress (1921–1965)

Doris Colleen
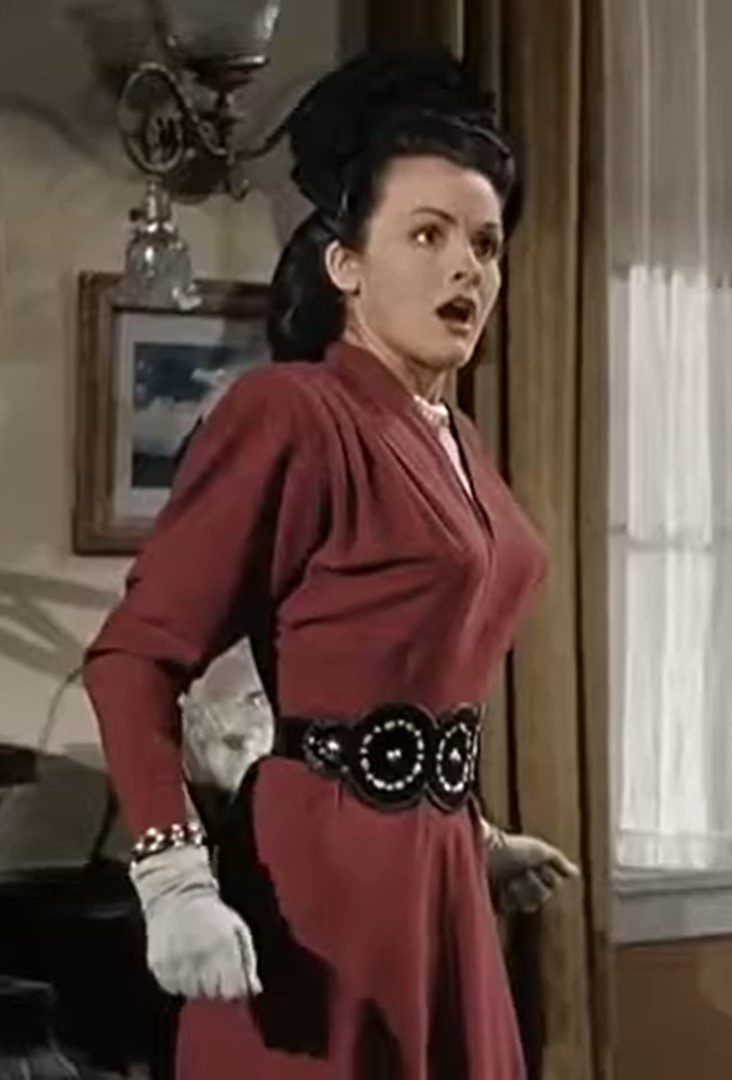
- Houck in Brideless Groom (1947)
- Born: Doris Colleen Houck; September 28, 1921; Wallace, Idaho, U.S.
- Died: December 14, 1965 (aged 44); Santa Monica, California, U.S.
- Resting place: Westwood Village Memorial Park Cemetery
- Other name: Doris Colleen
- Occupation: Actress
- Years active: 1940–1955
- Spouses: Edward G. Nealis (m. 1946; div. 1948) Fred Otash (m. 1950; div. 1952) Arthur Valando (m.1954: div 1956)
- Parent(s): George Eli Houck; Evalena Elizabeth Grohe

Doris Colleen Houck (September 28, 1921 – December 14, 1965), known professionally as Doris Colleen, was an American model, 1940s Florentine Gardens performer and film actress on contract with Columbia Studios. She appeared in 25+ films from 1945-1947. In the 1950s, she was a published BMI contract songwriter.

== Biography ==
Houck was the daughter of Mr. and Mrs. George Houck. In 1942, she changed her last name to Howe. She was a native of Wallace, Idaho.

Houck, credited as Doris Colleen, is familiar to modern viewers for her roles in several Three Stooges short subjects, such as G.I. Wanna Home. She is best remembered as the aggressive girlfriend who throws Shemp Howard's head into a vise until he decided to marry her in Brideless Groom:

- Shemp: "I'm getting a headache!"
- Houck: "I'll fix your headache!"

Houck also performed in night clubs.

In 1955, Houck signed an exclusive seven-year songwriting contract with Arthur Valanda, manager of T-C Publishing Corporation.

== Personal life ==
Houck was married to San Antonio, Texas oil man Edward G. Nealis; they divorced in May 1948. On January 6, 1950, Houck married Los Angeles police officer and Hollywood fixer Fred Otash, in Beverly Hills. They were divorced twice: the first order was vacated following a November 1950 reconciliation, and their second and final divorce was granted on June 19, 1952.

== Death ==
Houck died "from acute barbituate [sic] intoxication" on December 14, 1965, aged 44. She was cremated, and her remains are in Westwood Memorial Park in Los Angeles.

== Selected filmography ==
- Brideless Groom (1947)
- Little Miss Broadway (1947)
- G.I. Wanna Home (1946)
- Shadowed (1946)
- Landrush (1946)
- Heading West (1946)
- Two-Fisted Stranger (1946)
- Life with Blondie (1945)
