= If a Body Meets a Body =

1945 film by Jules White

- Directed by: Jules White
- Screenplay by: Jack White
- Story by: Gil Pratt
- Produced by: Jules White
- Starring: Moe Howard; Larry Fine; Curly Howard; Theodore Lorch; Fred Kelsey; Joe Palma; Al Thompson; Victor Travers; Dorothy Vernon
- Cinematography: Benjamin H. Kline
- Edited by: Charles Hochberg
- Distributed by: Columbia Pictures
- Release date: August 30, 1945 (U.S.)
- Running time: 18:11
- Country: United States
- Language: English

If a Body Meets a Body is a 1945 short subject directed by Jules White starring American slapstick comedy team The Three Stooges (Moe Howard, Larry Fine and Curly Howard). It is the 86th entry in the series released by Columbia Pictures starring the comedians, who released 190 shorts for the studio between 1934 and 1959.

== Plot ==
The Stooges, currently unemployed, sift through job listings in search of employment. While preparing a meal, Curly inadvertently includes a horseshoe in the soup, mistaking it for a juicy bone, prompting frustration from his companions. Their ire escalates when they discover a newspaper article announcing Curly's inheritance from his deceased uncle Bob O. Link. At the reading of the will, the lawyer overseeing the proceedings vanishes, along with the will itself, only to be later discovered murdered. Suspected of foul play, the Stooges, alongside other potential heirs, are confined to the mansion overnight.

During the night, eerie incidents unsettle the trio, including encounters with a parrot nesting within a human skull, ominous sounds, and the discovery of Link's corpse. In a moment of panic, the Stooges expose the killer, disguised as the maid, whose identity is unveiled when their wig dislodges, revealing the concealed will.

Upon perusing the will, the Stooges and Curly learn of the disproportionate allocation of inheritance, with Curly receiving a mere 67 cents compared to his cousin's substantial bequest, much to their chagrin.

== Production notes ==
The film title is a pun on a line from the traditional Scottish song by Robert Burns, "Coming Through the Rye" (as in "Should a body meet a body/Coming through the rye/Should a body kiss a body/Need a body cry?"). It is a remake of The Laurel-Hardy Murder Case (1930), which also features actor Fred Kelsey as the detective.

=== Curly Howard's decline ===
If a Body Meets a Body was filmed on March 9–13, 1945. It was the first film produced after Curly Howard suffered a mild stroke. As a result, his performance was marred by slurred speech and slower timing. Though the trio did not know it at the time, Curly's health would gradually deteriorate, resulting in languid, sickly performances through his final film with the Stooges, Half-Wits Holiday.

If a Body Meets a Body premiered the final version of "Three Blind Mice" as the Stooges' theme music, an updated rendition of "sliding strings" version previously used regularly from 1938's Flat Foot Stooges until 1942's What's the Matador?. This revamped version was arranged by John Leipold and Nico Grigor. Due to the timing of this theme's usage, it is often associated with the "ill Curly" period, as this revamped version coincidentally made its debut in the same film that Curly's illness became apparent. This version of "Three Blind Mice" would also be utilized for the first four shorts produced during the Shemp Howard era: Fright Night, Out West, Squareheads of the Round Table and The Hot Scots.
