= Victor Travers =

English actor (1884–1948)

- Travers in The Three Stooges film Three Pests in a Mess (1945)
- Born: 1884; Bradford, England, U.K.
- Died: 26 May 1948 (aged 64); Glendale, California, U.S.
- Resting place: Hollywood Forever Cemetery
- Occupation: Actor
- Years active: 1938–1948

Victor Travers (1884 – 26 May 1948) was an English character actor of theatre and film, known for his work in many of the Three Stooges films. During his career, which began in 1938 and ended with his death in 1948, he appeared in more than 80 films.

== Selected filmography ==
- Heavenly Daze (1948)
- All Gummed Up (1947)
- Hold That Lion! (1947)
- Blondie in the Dough (1947)
- The Good Bad Egg (1947)
- Half-Wits Holiday (1947)
- The Three Troubledoers (1946)
- Mr. Noisy (1946)
- If a Body Meets a Body (1945)
- Three Pests in a Mess (1945)
- The Yoke's on Me (1944)
- Crash Goes the Hash (1944)
- Phony Express (1943)
- Three Smart Saps (1942)
- Loco Boy Makes Good (1942)
- An Ache in Every Stake (1941)
- Only Angels Have Wings (1939)
- Three Sappy People (1939)
- Oily to Bed, Oily to Rise (1939)
- A Ducking They Did Go (1939)
- Tassels in the Air (1938)
