= Judy Malcolm =

American film actress (1910–1998)

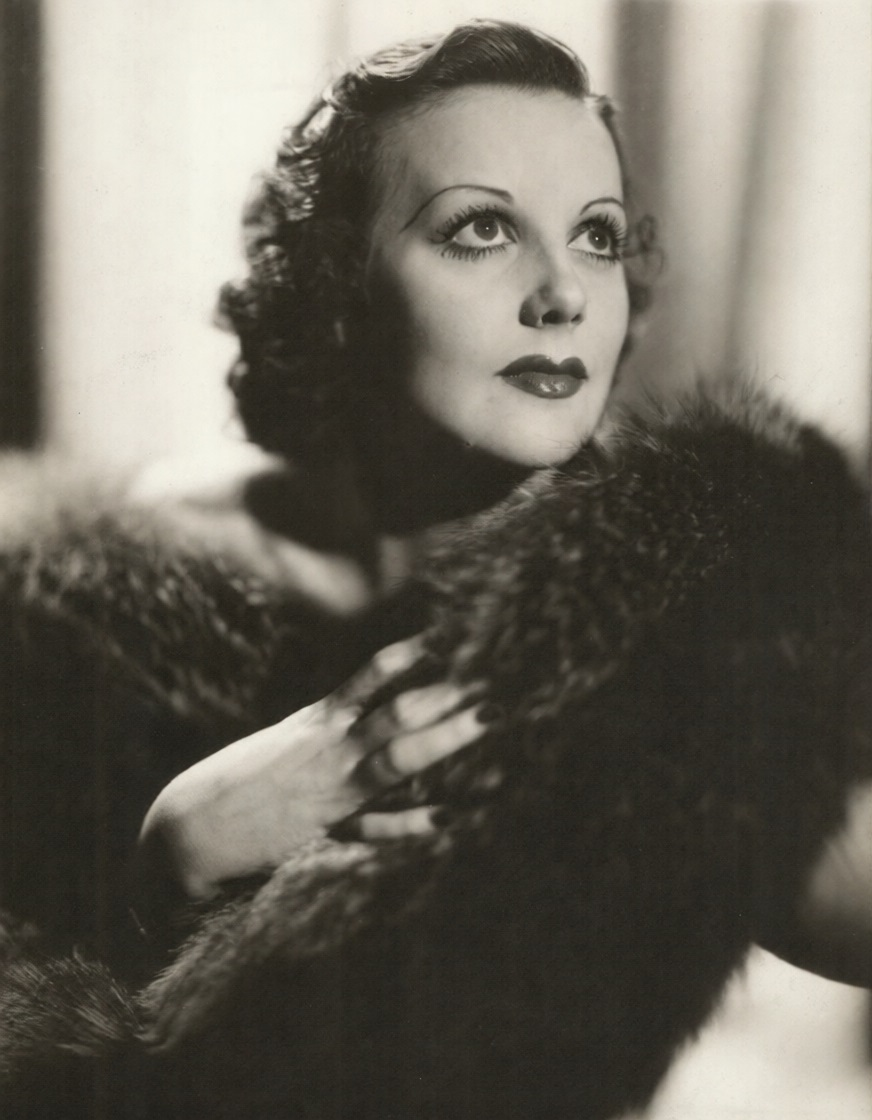
- Born: Marguerite Westergren; December 1, 1910; Buffalo, New York, U.S.
- Died: July 22, 1998 (aged 87); East Aurora, New York, U.S.
- Occupation: Film actress
- Years active: 1933-1955

Judy Malcolm (Born Marguerite Westergren; December 1, 1910 – July 22, 1998) was an American film actress. Malcolm appeared in approximately 25 films between 1933 and 1951. Malcolm is familiar to modern viewers for her roles in several Three Stooges short subjects such as G.I. Wanna Home, No Dough Boys, and especially Micro-Phonies (as the radio-station receptionist). She was also a stunt double for Fay Wray in the original King Kong, notably performing the jump from the cliff into the river.

== Early years ==
When Malcolm was 16 years old, she won a contest in Buffalo, New York, as "the one Buffalo girl who most closely resembles" film star Sally O'Neil. She hoped to become an actress and planned to save the $50 component of her prizes to go "to Hollywood or New York, where moving picture stars are made."

== Career ==
Judy Malcolm had been a dancer and comedienne in vaudeville and burlesque. Her partner in burlesque acts was rubber-faced comedian Gus Schilling. One of their standard bits would have Schilling standing on stage and Malcolm appearing out of nowhere and slapping him across the face, shouting, "How dare you look like somebody I hate!"

In 1943 Malcolm went to work as a contract player in short subjects for Columbia Pictures. It is likely that Malcolm brought Gus Schilling to producer Jules White's attention, because White soon teamed Schilling with character comedian Richard Lane for their own comedy series. Judy Malcolm appears in most of the Schilling & Lane comedies, and the "somebody I hate" punchline became a running gag. She retired from motion pictures in 1951.

Malcolm died on July 22, 1998.

== Selected filmography ==
- Heavenly Daze (1948)
- G.I. Wanna Home (1946)
- Micro-Phonies (1945)
- If a Body Meets a Body (1945) - Link family member (uncredited)
- No Dough Boys (1944)
- Gents Without Cents (1944)
- Crash Goes the Hash (1944)
- King Kong (1933)
