= The Curly Shuffle =

Single by Jump 'n the Saddle Band

from the album Jump 'n the Saddle Band
- B-side: "Jump for Joy"
- Released: 1983
- Recorded: 1983
- Genre: Western swing, novelty, comedy
- Label: Atlantic
- Songwriters: Peter Quinn (also includes music from "Listen to the Mocking Bird," author and/or composer unknown, believed to be public domain)
- Producers: T.C. Furlong, Barney Schwartz and Mike Rasfeld

Jump 'n the Saddle Band singles chronology
"The Curly Shuffle" (1983)	"It Should've Been Me" (1984)

"The Curly Shuffle" is a novelty song written by Chicago based singer and musician Peter Quinn as an homage to The Three Stooges film comedy team. It was initially recorded by Quinn's group Jump 'n the Saddle Band, and first released in late 1983. The timing of the recording nearly coincided with The Three Stooges receiving their star on the Hollywood Walk of Fame on August 30, 1983. This recording made #15 on the US Billboard charts in early 1984.

In Canada, the song was simultaneously released by The Knuckleheads on Attic Records, while Jump 'n the Saddle's version was also available. The Knuckleheads' version was the hit in Canada, reaching #29 on the Canadian RPM charts.

In Australia, both versions were issued, and both were minor chart hits.

== Jump 'N the Saddle version ==
The song had the band's lead vocalist Peter Quinn mimicking many of Curly Howard's catch phrases. Issued independently in mid-1983, "The Curly Shuffle" was picked up by Atlantic Records in November and climbed to number 15 on the Billboard Hot 100 in early 1984. The group never managed to produce another hit, issuing only one further single ("It Should've Been Me") before splitting up.

=== Music video ===
A promotional video was made using clips from various Three Stooges short films. The video was regularly shown on the Diamond Vision screen of the New York Mets at Shea Stadium in the mid-1980s, and became part of the fan experience. Additionally, it was included as a bonus feature on one of the 1984 Stooges compilation videos released by RCA/Columbia Pictures Home Video.

Clips from the following Stooges shorts were used:

An Ache in Every Stake; A Bird in the Head; Calling All Curs; Cash and Carry; Disorder in the Court; Dizzy Detectives; Dizzy Pilots; Dopey Dicks; Dutiful But Dumb; The Ghost Talks; Healthy, Wealthy, and Dumb; Micro-Phonies; No Census, No Feeling; Pardon My Scotch; A Plumbing We Will Go; Pop Goes the Easel; Punch Drunks; Some More of Samoa; Studio Stoops; Tassels in the Air; Three Little Beers; Three Missing Links; Three Sappy People; Uncivil Warriors; Violent is the Word for Curly; and Woman Haters. Instead of showing clips with Joe Besser, brief glimpses of Curly Joe DeRita and Shemp Howard were used.

=== Chart performance ===
Chart (1983–1984)	Peak position
U.S. Billboard Adult Contemporary	29
US Cashbox	9
US Billboard Hot 100	15
Australia	30

== The Knuckleheads version ==
The Knuckleheads were an ad hoc studio creation, convened in Toronto in late 1983 specifically to record a competing version of "The Curly Shuffle". The group consisted of Roy Kenner (vocals), Bernie LaBarge (guitars), Lou Pomanti (keyboards), Howard Ayee (bass), and Jörn Andersen (drums), and was produced by Jack Richardson. The Knuckleheads' version of "The Curly Shuffle" peaked at #29 on the Canadian singles charts; Jump 'n' the Saddle's version missed the Canadian chart completely. The Knuckleheads also recorded an album called The Curly Shuffle, which consisted largely of novelty tunes. The album did not chart, and the group quietly dissolved.

Chart (1983–1984)	Peak position
Canada (RPM)	29
Australia	43
