= Monkey Businessmen =

1946 film by Edward Bernds

- Columbia Pictures tagged Moe and Larry's names incorrectly on this one-sheet for Monkey Businessmen.
- Directed by: Edward Bernds
- Written by: Edward Bernds
- Produced by: Hugh McCollum
- Starring: Moe Howard; Larry Fine; Curly Howard; Kenneth MacDonald; Cy Schindell; Fred Kelsey; Snub Pollard; Jean Willes; Wade Crosby; Rocky Woods
- Cinematography: Philip Tannura
- Edited by: Paul Borofsky
- Distributed by: Columbia Pictures
- Release date: June 20, 1946 (U.S.)
- Running time: 18:09
- Country: United States
- Language: English

Monkey Businessmen is a 1946 short subject directed by Edward Bernds starring American slapstick comedy team The Three Stooges (Moe Howard, Larry Fine and Curly Howard). It is the 92nd entry in the series released by Columbia Pictures starring the comedians, who released 190 shorts for the studio between 1934 and 1959.

== Plot ==
The Stooges are inept electricians whose misadventures lead to their dismissal by their employer, Mr. Jordan, after inadvertently electrocuting themselves and their client, "Smilin'" Sam McGann and messing up the wiring. Prompted by Curly's suggestion for a respite, the trio embark on a retreat to Mallard's Rest Home, enticed by an advertisement promising relaxation.

Their arrival at the rest home introduces them to Dr. Mallard, who prescribes a regimen of exercise paired with a peculiar diet of milk. Assigned to the care of two nurses, the Stooges are initially enamored until discovering the nurses' true identities as men. Amidst their training, a mishap involving weights renders the nurses unconscious, revealing to the Stooges Dr. Mallard's fraudulent intentions.

Attempting to flee, the Stooges encounter obstacles, including Curly's injury and their subsequent capture by Dr. Mallard's henchmen. In a series of comedic escapades, the Stooges outmaneuver their captors, albeit with Moe and Larry briefly trapped in a steam room. Meanwhile, Curly's chance encounter with a wealthy individual, whose foot he fixes, results in a windfall of $1,000.

Curly's proposal to use the money for further relaxation elsewhere prompts Moe and Larry's disapproval, culminating in their characteristic response of physical retribution.

== Production notes ==
Two special effects in the film were achieved as follows: a smoke tube was hidden in Larry's hand when he feels Curly's burning forehead, and compressed air pipes were used to blow Moe's hair upwards.

=== Curly's illness ===
Monkey Businessmen was filmed January 30-February 2, 1946, the first entry to be filmed after the Stooges' annual seven-month production hiatus. 42-year-old Curly Howard had suffered a series of minor strokes in early 1945, and his performances had become marred by slurred speech and slower timing. Novice director Edward Bernds had to deal with Curly's condition while simultaneously learning the ropes of directing. Understandably, Bernds hoped the hiatus would allow Curly enough time to recover from the effects of his strokes and resume his abilities as the lead Stooge.

Instead, Curly's condition had worsened. The comedian was in such bad shape that brother Moe Howard had to coach him on his lines; he can be seen nudging Curly in Dr. Mallard's office, reminding him to say his line, "I know: a nice big bowl of milk!".

Bernds remembered the grueling filming process:

...it was strange the way he (Curly) went up and down. In the order I shot the pictures, not in the order they were released, he was down for A Bird in the Head and The Three Troubledoers, he was up for Micro-Phonies, way down for Monkey Businessmen, and then up again, for the last time, in Three Little Pirates. In Monkey Businessmen, he (Curly) was at his worst. Moe coached him the way one would a child, getting him to repeat each line after him. We had to shoot Curly repeating one line at a time.
