= Symona Boniface =

American actress (1894–1950)

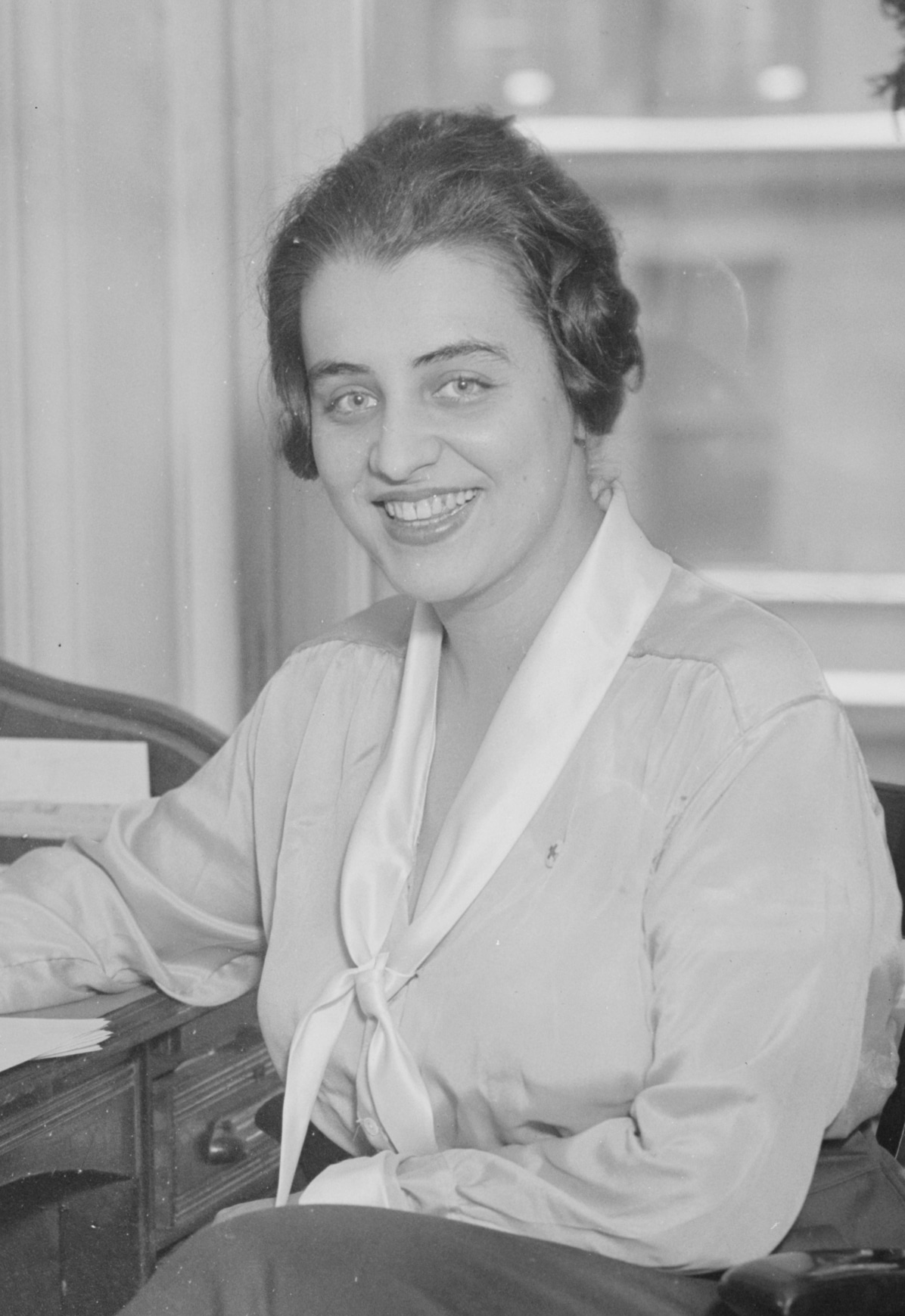
- Boniface in c. 1917
- Born: Symona Ferner Boniface; March 5, 1894; New York City, New York, U.S.
- Died: September 2, 1950 (aged 56); Woodland Hills, Los Angeles, California, U.S.
- Occupation: Actress
- Years active: 1925–1950
- Spouse: Frank Pharr Simms

Symona Ferner Boniface (March 5, 1894–September 2, 1950) was an American film actress, most frequently seen in bit parts in comedy shorts, mostly at Columbia Pictures, particularly those of The Three Stooges. She appeared in 120 films between 1925 and 1950.

== Early life ==
Symona Boniface was born in New York City, the daughter of actor George C. Boniface and his wife, Norma (née Ferner) Boniface, an inventor. Her father was of English descent and her mother of German ancestry. Both parents were born in New York.

== Career ==
Boniface developed an early interest in theater and participated in writing and performing for the stage. She transitioned to film in 1925, joining the Hal Roach Studios, which was known for producing short comedies. At Roach, she appeared in films alongside performers such as Charley Chase, the Our Gang children, Max Davidson, and Laurel and Hardy. Her roles typically cast her as society women, vamps, or matronly figures, due in part to her screen presence and bearing. These performances spanned both short subjects and feature films.

She began appearing in Columbia Pictures' two-reel comedies in 1935 and became a frequent supporting player in the studio's short-subject unit. Boniface worked with a variety of Columbia comedians, including Andy Clyde, Monte Collins and Tom Kennedy, Buster Keaton, Hugh Herbert, Vera Vague and The Three Stooges. In Stooge comedies, her roles often placed her in contrast to the trio's physical humor. Her characters were placed in comic scenarios involving wardrobe malfunctions, pratfalls, or slapstick mishaps, such as the mouse gag in Loco Boy Makes Good (1942) or water-soaked scenes in Spook Louder (1943) and Vagabond Loafers (1949).

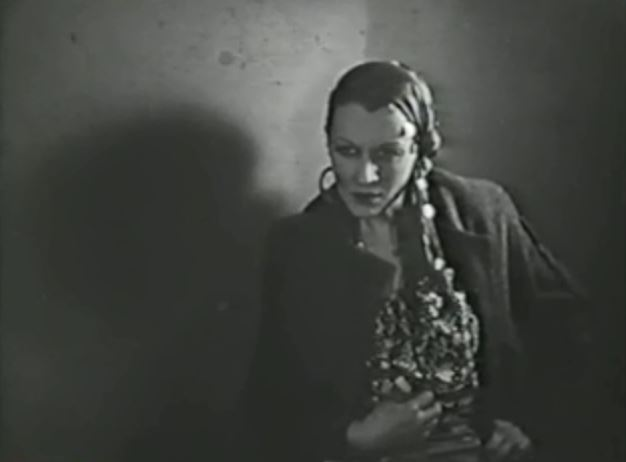
Symona Boniface in The Murder in the Museum (1934)

Director Edward Bernds regularly cast Boniface in larger roles in his scripts for Columbia shorts. She was featured in Micro-Phonies (1945) and continued to portray wealthy or authoritative women in comedies alongside performers such as Gus Schilling, Richard Lane, and Harry Von Zell.

One of her most notable scenes occurred in Half-Wits Holiday (1947), a remake of the earlier Stooge short Hoi Polloi (1935). In the film, Moe Howard tosses a pie into the air to avoid detection, and it lands on Boniface's character, Mrs. Smythe-Smythe, after a moment of comedic suspense. The gag was considered effective enough to be reused in later shorts, including Pest Man Wins (1951), Scheming Schemers (1956), and Pies and Guys (1958), through stock footage after Boniface's death.

Her final on-screen performance was in the unaired television pilot Jerks of All Trades (1949), featuring The Three Stooges and Emil Sitka.

== Personal life ==
Boniface was married to Frank Pharr Simms, a salesman and real estate broker originally from Decatur, Georgia.

She died from pancreatic cancer on September 2, 1950, in Woodland Hills, Los Angeles, California, at the age of 56. Her grave at Valhalla Memorial Park Cemetery had been unmarked for a half a century until 2005 when it was eventually placed by The Three Stooges fans.

== Selected filmography ==
- Baby Brother (1927, Short) - Party guest
- The Mysterious Lady (1928) - Party Guest (uncredited)
- Forgotten Faces (1928) - Roulette Player (uncredited)
- Show Girl (1928) - Show Girl (uncredited)
- Show People (1928) - Guest (uncredited)
- The Fatal Warning (1929) - Marie Jordan
- The Kiss (1929) - Gossip in Museum (uncredited)
- The Vagabond Lover (1929) - Musicale Guest (uncredited)
- Sunny Side Up (1929) - Woman in hallucination montage (uncredited)
- Daybreak (1931) - Bystander at Baccarat Table (uncredited)
- The Public Defender (1931) - Auction Attendee (uncredited)
- Dragnet Patrol (1931) - Ethel Bainbrick
- The Man Who Played God (1932) - Woman in Audience (uncredited)
- Arsène Lupin (1932) - Party Guest (uncredited)
- It's Tough to Be Famous (1932) - Autograph Seeker (uncredited)
- Back Street (1932) - Lady at Casino (uncredited)
- Pack Up Your Troubles (1932) - Wedding Guest (uncredited)
- Call Her Savage (1932) - Gambling Lady (uncredited)
- The Mind Reader (1933) - Gossip in Phone Montage (uncredited)
- Reunion in Vienna (1933) - Noblewoman (uncredited)
- Tarzan the Fearless (1933) - Sara (uncredited)
- Skyway (1933) - Baker's Girlfriend (uncredited)
- Beauty for Sale (1933) - Mrs. Fletcher (uncredited)
- Christopher Bean (1933) - Auction Participant (uncredited)
- The House on 56th Street (1933) - Blackjack Player (uncredited)
- Girl Without a Room (1933) - Woman (uncredited)
- Easy to Love (1934) - Roulette Table Player (uncredited)
- The Black Cat (1934) - Cultist (uncredited)
- The Murder in the Museum (1934) - Katura the Seeress
- The Count of Monte Cristo (1934) - Party Guest (uncredited)
- One Night of Love (1934) - Minor Role (uncredited)
- British Agent (1934) - Ball Guest at British Embassy (uncredited)
- Among the Missing (1934) - Prisoner (uncredited)
- Broadway Bill (1934) - (uncredited)
- Shanghai (1935) - Night Club Patron (uncredited)
- Pardon My Scotch (1935, Short) - Party Guest (uncredited)
- The Last Days of Pompeii (1935) - Slave Auction Observer (uncredited)
- The Golden Arrow (1936) - (uncredited)
- Marihuana (1936) - Helen - Burma's Customer (uncredited)
- Girls' Dormitory (1936) - Professor Clotilde Federa
- Slippery Silks (1936, Short) - Mrs. Morgan Morgan (uncredited)
- That Girl from Paris (1936) - Wedding Guest (uncredited)
- Confession (1937) - Actress (uncredited)
- Termites of 1938 (1938, Short) - Guest (uncredited)
- Tassels in the Air (1938, Short) - One of Mrs. Smirch's card-playing friends (uncredited)
- Women Are Like That (1938) - Lady Behind Claudius on Boat (uncredited)
- In Early Arizona (1938) - Doc's Saloon Sweetheart (uncredited)
- On Your Toes (1939) - Woman in Audience (uncredited)
- Ninotchka (1939) - Gossip (uncredited)
- A Plumbing We Will Go (1940, Short) - Party Guest (uncredited)
- No Census, No Feeling (1940, Short) - Bridge Party Hostess (uncredited)
- Souls in Pawn (1940) - Nurse at 'The Manger'
- All the World's a Stooge (1941, Short) - Party Guest (uncredited)
- An Ache in Every Stake (1941, Short) - Party Guest (uncredited)
- In the Sweet Pie and Pie (1941, Short) - Mrs. Gottrocks (uncredited)
- Some More of Samoa (1941, Short) - Mrs. Winthrop (uncredited)
- Loco Boy Makes Good (1942, Short) - Nightclub Patron with Mouse Down Dress (uncredited)
- Woman of the Year (1942) - Tess' Party Guest (uncredited)
- Born to Sing (1942) - Audience Member (uncredited)
- One Dangerous Night (1943) - Woman (uncredited)
- Murder in Times Square (1943) - Theatre Patron (uncredited)
- Spook Louder (1943, Short) - Well-Dressed Woman (uncredited)
- Clancy Street Boys (1943) - Dress Saleslady (uncredited)
- The Fallen Sparrow (1943) - Guest (uncredited)
- Crash Goes the Hash (1944, Short) - Mrs. Van Bustle (uncredited)
- Wilson (1944) - White House Reception Guest (uncredited)
- Mrs. Parkington (1944) - Clothing Fitter (uncredited)
- Lost in a Harem (1944) - Slave Girl (uncredited)
- Her Highness and the Bellboy (1945) - Maid (uncredited)
- Girls of the Big House (1945) - Matron (uncredited)
- Micro-Phonies (1945, Short) - Mrs. Bixby
- The Notorious Lone Wolf (1946) - Grand Dame at Airport (uncredited)
- Gilda (1946) - Gambler at Roulette Table (uncredited)
- Talk About a Lady (1946) - Ladies' League Woman (uncredited)
- Two Sisters from Boston (1946) - Opera Cast Member (uncredited)
- Earl Carroll Sketchbook (1946) - Screaming Woman (uncredited)
- The Mysterious Mr. Valentine (1946) - Landlady (uncredited)
- Gallant Journey (1946) - Dance Floor Extra (uncredited)
- G.I. Wanna Home (1946, Short) - Landlady (uncredited)
- The Jolson Story (1946) - Woman in Audience (uncredited)
- The Beast with Five Fingers (1946) - Mourner (uncredited)
- Half-Wits Holiday (1947, Short) - Mrs. Smythe-Smythe (uncredited)
- Angel and the Badman (1947) - Dance Hall Madam (uncredited)
- Born to Kill (1947) - Gambler at Roulette Table (uncredited)
- All Gummed Up (1947, Short) - Mother-in-law (uncredited)
- Heavenly Daze (1948, Short) - Mrs. DePuyster (uncredited)
- The Untamed Breed (1948) - Milly (uncredited)
- The Return of October (1948) - Hedwig (uncredited)
- Joan of Arc (1948) - Peasant (uncredited)
- The Man from Colorado (1949) - Matron (uncredited)
- Slightly French (1949) - Party Guest (uncredited)
- Vagabond Loafers (1949, Short) - Mrs. Norfleet
- Appointment with Danger (1950) - Woman (uncredited)
- Beware of Blondie (1950) - A Gossip (uncredited)
- Rogues of Sherwood Forest (1950) - Charcoal Burner's Wife (uncredited)
- Between Midnight and Dawn (1950) - Minor Role (uncredited)
- Pirates of the High Seas (1950, Serial) - Lotus Lady
- Pest Man Wins (1951, Short) - Mrs. Smythe-Smythe (archive footage) (uncredited)
- Bedlam in Paradise (1955, Short) - Mrs. De Puyster (archive footage) (uncredited)
- Scheming Schemers (1956, Short) - Mrs. Norfleet (archive footage)
- Pies and Guys (1958, Short) - (archive footage)
- Stop! Look! and Laugh! (1960) - Mrs. Bixby / Party Guest (archive footage) (uncredited)
