= Three Little Pirates =

1946 film by Edward Bernds

- Directed by: Edward Bernds
- Written by: Clyde Bruckman
- Produced by: Hugh McCollum
- Starring: Moe Howard; Larry Fine; Curly Howard; Vernon Dent; Christine McIntyre; Robert Stevens; Dorothy DeHaven; Joe Palma; Cy Schindell; Al Thompson
- Cinematography: Philip Tannura
- Edited by: Paul Borofsky
- Distributed by: Columbia Pictures
- Release date: December 5, 1946 (U.S.)
- Running time: 17:51
- Country: United States
- Language: English

Three Little Pirates is a 1946 short subject directed by Edward Bernds starring American slapstick comedy team The Three Stooges (Moe Howard, Larry Fine and Curly Howard). It is the 96th entry in the series released by Columbia Pictures starring the comedians, who released 190 shorts for the studio between 1934 and 1959.

== Plot ==
In 1672, the Stooges are mariners aboard a refuse barge, marooned on the desolate Dead Man's Island. Their arrival attracts the attention of the island's governor, initially skeptical of their claims until their unmistakable sailor-like behavior confirms their profession. However, their fortunes quickly sour when Curly's harmless flirtation with the governor's betrothed, Rita, earns them the governor's ire.

Condemned to a grim fate of either beheading or immolation, the Stooges face imminent execution. A twist of fate intervenes in the form of Rita's disdain for her would-be husband's tyrannical rule. Resourcefully, she aids the Stooges in their escape by revealing concealed tools and guiding them to safety through an underground passage. However, their relentless bickering leads them astray, leading to their re-incarceration.

Undeterred, Rita proposes a ruse wherein the Stooges masquerade as exotic dignitaries bearing lavish gifts. Curly assumes the guise of the myopic Maharaja of Canarsie, boasting dominions over the islands of Coney and Long. Moe adopts the role of Gin of Rummy, while Larry plays his accomplice. Their nonsensical banter and comically absurd offerings, including a raspberry lollipop mistaken for a gemstone and a fountain pen misconstrued as a walrus tusk, deceive the governor, facilitating their escape.

Their flight leads them into the clutches of the nefarious pirate Black Louie, with whom they engage in a perilous game of knife-throwing. Rita discreetly alerts them to the governor's vendetta, necessitating their hasty departure. However, Curly's ineptitude, compounded by his thick-lensed glasses, disrupts their escape, precipitating a showdown with Black Louie's crew. Emerging victorious, the Stooges briefly entertain dreams of sovereignty until Moe's ignoble defeat by a whimsical contraption, humbling their aspirations and prompting their departure from the island.

== Cast ==
=== Credited ===
- Moe Howard as Moe
- Larry Fine as Larry
- Curly Howard as Curly
- Vernon Dent as Governor
- Christine McIntyre as Rita Yolanda
- Robert Stevens as Black Louie
- Dorothy DeHaven as Chiquita

=== Uncredited ===
- Joe Palma as Jack
- Cy Schindell as Dirk
- Al Thompson as Pirate

== Production notes ==
This is the 12th of 16 Stooge shorts with the word "three" in the title.

The Stooges had previously performed the "Maharaja" routine in Time Out for Rhythm (1941). They would resurrect the routine with Joe DeRita as the third stooge on The Steve Allen Show (1959) and in the theatrical feature The Three Stooges Go Around the World in a Daze (1963). Moe Howard also later performed a variation of the routine, with Mike Douglas and Soupy Sales, in November 1973 television appearance on The Mike Douglas Show.

Canarsie, Bay Meadows, Flatbush, and the isles of Coney and Long are references to New York-based localities where brothers Moe, Curly, and Shemp Howard spent their childhood. It is all the more appropriate, as the Stooges are sailors shipwrecked off of a New York City garbage scow.

=== Curly's last hurrah ===
Three Little Pirates was produced during April 15–18, 1946, a period marked by Curly Howard's health struggles following a series of minor strokes. Prior films like Three Loan Wolves and G.I. Wanna Home had notably shifted focus away from Curly, with Moe and Larry assuming more prominent roles due to Curly's impaired speech and slower timing.

Despite his ailments, Curly was on his game and delivered a top performance in Three Little Pirates. Notably, he flawlessly executed the memorable "Maharaja" routine alongside Moe. Additionally, Curly showcased his talent for physical comedy, as seen when he briefly reclines on a chair in one scene.

Director Edward Bernds observed Curly's decline across successive films produced during this period:

"I guess I should be thankful that Curly was in one of his 'up' periods, because it was strange the way he went up and down. He was down for A Bird in the Head and The Three Troubledoers, he was up for Micro-Phonies, way down for Monkey Businessmen. In Three Little Pirates, he was terrific. It was the last flash of the old Curly."

While 1946 was considered a weak year for Stooge releases due to Curly's health challenges, Three Little Pirates stood out as a notable exception, showcasing Curly's enduring comedic prowess despite his illness.

== Quotes ==
Governor: "You have your choice — you may have your heads chopped off, or you may be burned at the stake."
Curly: "We'll take burning at the stake!"
Governor: "Very well. We'll toast them Monday at sundown."
Moe (angrily): "What did you pick 'burning at the stake' for?!"
Curly: "Cause a hot steak is better than a cold chop!"
Curly: "Eenee, meenee, miney, moe. See, ya can't go wrong with moe."
Moe (sarcastically): "Heh, heh, heh. Thanks!" *SLAP!*
