= Booby Dupes =

1945 film by Del Lord

- Directed by: Del Lord
- Written by: Del Lord
- Produced by: Hugh McCollum
- Starring: Moe Howard; Larry Fine; Curly Howard; Vernon Dent; Rebel Randall; Snub Pollard; John Tyrrell; Dorothy Vernon
- Cinematography: Glen Gano
- Edited by: Henry Batista
- Distributed by: Columbia Pictures
- Release date: March 17, 1945 (U.S.)
- Running time: 17:02
- Country: United States
- Language: English

Booby Dupes is a 1945 short subject directed by Del Lord starring American slapstick comedy team The Three Stooges (Moe Howard, Larry Fine and Curly Howard). It is the 84th entry in the series released by Columbia Pictures starring the comedians, who released 190 shorts for the studio between 1934 and 1959.

== Plot ==
The Stooges are fish peddlers who opt to bypass intermediaries by catching their own fish. Procuring fishermen uniforms and a boat, they encounter a series of comedic misadventures, including Curly inadvertently acquiring a navy captain's uniform while flirting with the captain's partner.

Following this episode, the trio regroups and invests in a propeller boat, using funds raised from trading their car. However, their vessel proves to be faulty, and they find themselves in dire straits when it begins to sink at sea. Seeking rescue, they board their spare dinghy and attempt to signal passing planes for assistance.

Unfortunately, their distress signal, crafted from a white rag adorned with a large red paint splatter, bears an unintended resemblance to the flag of Japan. Mistaken for Japanese sailors by overhead bombers, the Stooges become targets of an aerial attack. In a bid to evade the onslaught, Moe ingeniously constructs a makeshift motor using a propeller and Curly's victrola, enabling the trio to flee the scene amidst the chaos.

== Production notes ==
Filmed on September 27–30, 1944, Booby Dupes is a partial remake of the 1932 Laurel and Hardy short film Towed in a Hole. In addition, the gag of a victrola acting as a car radio appeared in the duo's 1932 film Busy Bodies. The title is a play on the line "boop-oop-a-doop" from the song "I Wanna Be Loved by You," made famous by singer Helen Kane and by the Fleischer Studios cartoon character Betty Boop.

This is one of a few shorts in which one of the boys call themselves "the Stooges", screamed by Moe as the bomber tries to sink their boat.

This is also the final episode in the Curly era directed by Del Lord, who would direct his last episode with the Stooges in Shivering Sherlocks with Shemp Howard, thus making it the only film he directed with Shemp as a member of the Stooges.

During World War II, the Stooges released a handful of comedies that engaged in propaganda against the then-enemy Japanese, including Spook Louder, No Dough Boys, Booby Dupes, and The Yoke's on Me.

Curly Howard's mannerisms and reactions had been starting to slow down. In Booby Dupes, his condition varies; he is in top form at the beginning and end of the film, but appears somewhat sluggish during the middle sequence involving his stealing navy Capt. Vernon Dent's uniform and flirting with girlfriend Rebel Randall.
