= Jump 'n the Saddle Band =

American Western swing band

Background information
- Origin: Chicago, Illinois, U.S.
- Genres: Western swing; country pop
- Years active: 1983–2000s
- Labels: Atlantic

Jump 'n the Saddle Band was an American Western swing band from Chicago, Illinois, United States. They scored a regional hit on the Acme label with the swing-style novelty song "The Curly Shuffle" in 1983, a tribute to Curly Howard of The Three Stooges. As the song gained popularity on radio, the group signed to Atlantic Records and released a self-titled album, composed mostly of covers, in 1984. "The Curly Shuffle" eventually became a major American hit, peaking at #15 on the Billboard Hot 100 later that year. The song also peaked at #30 in Australia. Much of its success can be attributed to the music video, which contained many Three Stooges clips.

The band negotiated with Atlantic for a follow-up album in 1984. The label wanted them to record the song "Shaving Cream" as their next single, but the band did not like the idea, so they recorded the song with lyrics critical of the label and were soon dropped.

Their success was short-lived, and the group never again enjoyed nationwide exposure. The band continued to play in the Chicago area, still performing into the 2000s.

== Members ==
- Vincent Dee — drums
- Tom "T.C." Furlong — pedal steel guitar
- Rick Gourley — bass guitar
- Peter Quinn — vocals, harmonica; later joined the band Skip Towne & the Greyhounds
- David Roberts — keyboards and vocals
- Anne Schwartz — bass guitar and vocals
- Barney Schwartz — guitar and vocals
- Tom Trinka — saxophone; later joined the band Skip Towne & the Greyhounds

The band that recorded "The Curly Shuffle" consisted of Dee, Furlong, Quinn, Roberts, Schwartz and Trinka, with Quinn on lead vocals.
