= Violent Is the Word for Curly =

1938 American short film by Charley Chase

- Directed by: Charley Chase
- Written by: Al Giebler; Elwood Ullman
- Produced by: Charley Chase; Hugh McCollum
- Starring: Moe Howard; Larry Fine; Curly Howard; Bud Jamison; Gladys Gale; Alex Novinsky; Marjorie Deanne; Pat Gleason; Al Thompson
- Cinematography: Lucien Ballard
- Edited by: Art Seid
- Distributed by: Columbia Pictures
- Release date: July 2, 1938 (U.S.)
- Running time: 17:51
- Country: United States
- Language: English

Violent Is the Word for Curly is a 1938 short subject directed by Charley Chase starring American slapstick comedy team The Three Stooges (Moe Howard, Larry Fine and Curly Howard). It is the 32nd entry in the series released by Columbia Pictures starring the comedians, who released 190 shorts for the studio between 1934 and 1959.

== Plot ==
At Mildew College, an institution exclusively for female students, the administration seeks financial support from Mrs. Catsby, the school's principal benefactor, to establish an athletic fund. However, Mrs. Catsby holds reservations about endorsing athletic endeavors for girls and opts instead to allocate funds towards the salaries of three incoming Teutonic professors. Concurrently, the Stooges find themselves employed as attendants at the Acme Service Station, where their comically inept service style leads to a series of mishaps culminating in the destruction of a chauffeur-driven Packard belonging to three elderly German passengers. Fleeing the scene in an ice cream truck with the passengers' luggage, the Stooges embark on a chaotic journey.

After several hours of aimless travel, the stooges run out of gas. Moe and Larry discover Curly frozen solid within the truck and devise a makeshift method to thaw him, but they accidentally burn him in the process. Curly plunges into a nearby lake to cool off, dragging his companions with him. Seeking dry clothes within the abandoned suitcases in their possession, the Stooges unwittingly don the attire of the three newly arrived professors destined for Mildew College.

Upon their arrival at the college, the Stooges are mistaken for the new professors and are promptly introduced to the student body, culminating in Moe initiating a rendition of the song "Swingin' the Alphabet," with Larry and Curly singing along. The performance gradually deviates into a spirited and syncopated rendition.

Amidst the confusion, the real professors show up during the lunch event, revealing the Stooges' true identities, which prompts the irate Mrs. Catsby to demand their departure. In a bid to salvage their position, the Stooges propose a demonstration of athletic prowess to sway Mrs. Catsby's opinion. However, their efforts are thwarted by the scheming professors, who tamper with a basketball, leading to an explosive finale. Ultimately, the Stooges secure Mrs. Catsby's support for the athletic fund by apprehending the professors.

== Production notes ==
Violent Is the Word for Curly was filmed March 14–17, 1938. The film's title is a parody of the 1936 RKO film Valiant Is the Word for Carrie; the title is notable for being the first that has little bearing on the film's plot.

Footage was reused in the 1960 compilation feature film Stop! Look! and Laugh! A colorized version was released in 2004 as part of the DVD collection "Stooged & Confoosed."

Vesey O'Davoren appeared as Professor Hicks.

=== Curly's injury ===
During one scene, Curly is tied to a revolving spit that is placed over an open fire. He is then "roasted" in order to thaw him out after having slept in an ice cream truck. Future Stooge director Edward Bernds was present during the filming and noticed that Curly's weight was causing a problem. "Curly was so heavy Moe and Larry couldn't turn the crank," Bernds said. "The straps holding him slipped and he was hanging directly over the fire. Before they could get him off, he was pretty well seared. Curly was hollering his head off, and I don't blame him. Being roasted alive belongs to the Inquisition, not making two-reel comedies."
