= Spook Louder =

1943 American short film by Del Lord

- Directed by: Del Lord
- Written by: Clyde Bruckman
- Produced by: Del Lord; Hugh McCollum
- Starring: Moe Howard; Larry Fine; Curly Howard; Stanley Blystone; Heinie Conklin; William Kelley; Lew Kelly; Helen Servis; Symona Boniface; Stanley Brown; Charles Middleton; Ted Lorch; Shirley Patterson
- Cinematography: John Stumar
- Edited by: Paul Borofsky
- Distributed by: Columbia Pictures
- Release date: April 2, 1943 (U.S.)
- Running time: 16:01
- Country: United States
- Language: English

Spook Louder is a 1943 comedy mystery short subject, directed by Del Lord starring American slapstick comedy team The Three Stooges (Moe Howard, Larry Fine and Curly Howard). It is the 69th entry in the series released by Columbia Pictures starring the comedians, who released 190 shorts for the studio between 1934 and 1959.

The film is set in an eerie mansion. An inventor appoints the Stooges as the mansion's new caretakers. During his absence, spies attempt to steal his inventions. The Stooges have to defend the mansion from the intruders.

The film was one of several World War II-era propaganda films featuring the Stooges, depicting the threat posed at the time by the hostile Empire of Japan. The film features the running joke of "a phantom pie-thrower".

== Plot ==
A newspaper reporter interviews Professor J.O. Dunkfeather to gather information about a spy ring broken up by three salesmen.

Dunkfeather narrates a story that commences with the Stooges portraying traveling salesmen trying unsuccessfully to market the "Miracle Reducing Machine". Fortuitously, the trio stumbles upon the residence of the inventor Graves, who mistakenly assumes them to be the new caretakers. Graves, en route to Washington, D.C., entrusts his eerie mansion to the Stooges, intending to return after demonstrating his revolutionary death ray machine. In Graves' absence, nefarious spies in Halloween costumes steal into the mansion, unsettling the Stooges. The Stooges become further agitated by unexplained cream pie projectiles, thrown by an unseen antagonist.

Cornered by the spies, the Stooges employ a bomb provided by Graves, effectively subduing the criminals and safeguarding Graves' confidential inventions.

The narrative returns to the present as the inquisitive reporter seeks the identity of the mysterious pie-thrower. Dunkfeather claims responsibility, but is suddenly and inexplicably hit in the face by a hurled pie, casting doubt on his account.

== Production notes ==
The title Spook Louder is a pun combining the request "speak louder" with the "spooks" of a mansion. It is a remake of the 1931 Mack Sennett film The Great Pie Mystery.

Co-stars Charles Middleton and Ted Lorch also appeared together in the 1936 serial Flash Gordon. This was Middleton's only appearance in a Stooge short.

Filmed on July 17–21, 1942, Spook Louder was one of several World War II-era Stooges shorts that engaged in propaganda against the then-enemy Japanese, with others including No Dough Boys, Booby Dupes and, notably, The Yoke's on Me.

== Reception ==
The Stooge films released between 1942 and 1944 were considered to be a step down in quality from previous entries made between 1935 and 1941. Spook Louder, in particular, was singled out by author Ted Okuda as "their worst picture in some time. The story of a phantom pie-thrower is a repetitious one-joke affair devoid of laughs."

== In popular culture ==
Several scenes from Spook Louder appear in the 1992 film Radio Flyer.
