= Pardon My Scotch =

1935 American short film by Del Lord

- Directed by: Del Lord
- Written by: Andrew Bennison
- Produced by: Jules White
- Starring: Moe Howard; Larry Fine; Curly Howard; Nat Carr; James C. Morton; Billy Gilbert; Gladys Gale; Al Thompson; Symona Boniface
- Cinematography: George Meehan
- Edited by: James Sweeney
- Distributed by: Columbia Pictures
- Release date: August 1, 1935 (U.S.)
- Running time: 18:39
- Country: United States
- Language: English

Pardon My Scotch is a 1935 short subject directed by Del Lord starring American slapstick comedy team The Three Stooges (Moe Howard, Larry Fine and Curly Howard). It is the ninth entry in the series released by Columbia Pictures starring the comedians, who appeared in 190 shorts at the studio between 1934 and 1959.

== Plot ==
The Stooges are inept professional carpenters who assume temporary stewardship of a drugstore when its proprietor departs to negotiate a large purchase of alcohol consequent to the end of Prohibition. In his absence, the trio attend to a customer who requests an alcoholic "pick-me-up". The Stooges try to concoct a suitable libation using an eclectic array of medicines and chemicals, blended in a Wellington boot.

The resulting concoction, formidable in its potency, dissolves a wicker chair used as an improvised sieve. Despite its unconventional composition, the libation garners favor with the customer, who misconstrues it as Scotch. He reveals that he is a liquor salesman and declares that the trio's concoction, if produced in quantity, could make the four of them rich. He entreats the Stooges to masquerade as Scotsmen and attend a soirée at his employer's residence.

Following a sequence featuring a spirited, raucous Highland Fling dance and a tumultuous dinner, the centerpiece of the event unfolds with the presentation of the barrel containing the formidable "scotch" brew. The Stooges' clumsy attempt to tap the barrel precipitates a catastrophic explosion, engulfing the assembled guests in a deluge of foam.

== Cast ==
=== Credited ===
- Moe Howard as Moe
- Larry Fine as Larry
- Curly Howard as Curly
- Nat Carr as Mr. Martin
- James C. Morton as J. T. Walton

=== Uncredited ===
- Al Thompson as Mr. Jones
- Gladys Gale as Mrs. Walton
- Billy Gilbert as Signor Louis Balero Cantino
- Barlowe Borland as Scotsman from Loch Lomond
- Symona Boniface as Larry's dinner companion
- Alec Craig as Short bagpiper
- Scotty Dunsmuir as Tall bagpiper

== Production notes ==
Pardon My Scotch was filmed on April 11–15, 1935, sixteen months after the ratification of the Twenty-first Amendment, which ended the American experiment with Prohibition. This event is an integral part of the storyline, with the drugstore owner (Al Thompson) frantically attempting to lay in a stock of liquor in anticipation of the imminent end of Prohibition.

The title Pardon My Scotch parodies the expression "Pardon my French." The term "Scotch" for "Scottish" is now considered impolite, although "Scotch" as a type of whiskey is still acceptable.

Pardon My Scotch is the first Stooge film to employ "Listen to the Mocking Bird" as the Stooges' official theme song, as arranged by Louis Silvers. It would be used up to and including 1939's Three Little Sew and Sews.

The gag of tossing fruit into a singer's open mouth was reused in the 1945 film Micro-Phonies.

When the liquor supplier prepares to consume the Stooges' volatile concoction, they wish him well in a triad pattern saying "Over the river," "Skip the gutter," and concluding with "Ver gerharget," a Yiddish expression meaning "get killed" or "drop dead."

The opera singer Signor Louis Balero Cantino was played by Billy Gilbert, who previously played a dangerous patient in the Three Stooges short Men in Black and would later co-star with close friend and future Stooge Shemp Howard in three B-comedies for Monogram Pictures in the 1940s. His character sings a variation on the classic Neapolitan barcarolle Santa Lucia.

The scene where the Stooges perform while the bagpipes played was featured in the film Daddy Day Care (2003).

=== Moe's injury ===
During the opening scene where the boys are assembling a door, Moe asks Curly to saw a piece of wood for him. Curly lays the wood on top of a wooden table, which Moe happens to be standing on. Curly then proceeds to buzzsaw both the wood and table in half, with the table splitting in two. However, the table split inward on Moe's half of it, and Moe came crashing down on his left side, breaking three ribs. He was able to pull himself up and deliver a double slap to Larry and Curly before collapsing. Moe was then rushed to the hospital while production ceased briefly. In his 1977 autobiography Moe Howard and the Three Stooges (later published as I Stooged to Conquer), Moe incorrectly identified the film in which this injury occurred as Beer and Pretzels, but otherwise recalled the injury and how it happened correctly.

The opening scene footage was reused in 1943 at the start of Dizzy Detectives.
