= Hula-La-La =

1951 film by Hugh McCollum

- Directed by: Hugh McCollum
- Written by: Edward Bernds
- Produced by: Hugh McCollum
- Starring: Moe Howard; Larry Fine; Shemp Howard; Jean Willes; Kenneth MacDonald; Emil Sitka; Joy Windsor; Maxine Doviat; Heinie Conklin
- Cinematography: Henry Freulich
- Edited by: Edwin H. Bryant
- Distributed by: Columbia Pictures
- Release date: November 1, 1951 (U.S.)
- Running time: 16:06
- Country: United States
- Language: English

Hula-La-La is a 1951 short subject directed by Hugh McCollum starring American slapstick comedy team The Three Stooges (Moe Howard, Larry Fine and Shemp Howard). It is the 135th entry in the series released by Columbia Pictures starring the comedians, who released 190 shorts for the studio between 1934 and 1959.

== Plot ==
The Stooges, employed as choreographers by B.O. Pictures, are tasked with imparting dance skills to the indigenous population of the fictional Pacific island of Rarabonga. This endeavor is orchestrated by the studio's president, Mr. Baines, who has procured the island for his upcoming musical production. However, upon their arrival, the Stooges discover that the islanders, under the sway of the malevolent witch doctor Varanu, are cannibalistic headhunters with no knowledge of dancing.

In their efforts to escape the perilous situation, the Stooges form an alliance with Luana, the daughter of the tribal king, who seeks their aid in rescuing her boyfriend from Varanu's clutches. Amidst their escapades, the Stooges encounter various challenges, including a confrontation with a formidable totem idol guarding a cache of World War II grenades. Despite initial setbacks, the Stooges manage to outwit Varanu by tricking him into demonstrating his swordsmanship on the grenades, resulting in his demise when they detonate.

With Varanu vanquished, the Stooges proceed with their original mission, utilizing their choreographic expertise to instruct the islanders in the art of dance, thereby fulfilling their assignment from B.O. Pictures.

== Cast ==
=== Credited ===
- Shemp Howard as Shemp
- Larry Fine as Larry
- Moe Howard as Moe
- Jean Willes as Luana
- Kenneth MacDonald as Varanu, Witch Doctor
- Emil Sitka as Mr. Baines
- Joy Windsor as Kiwana

=== Uncredited ===
- Lei Aloha as Four-Armed idol
- Heinie Conklin as King
- Maxine Doviat as Native Girl
- Mike Mahoney as Mr. Laughingwell
- Ralph Volkie as Native Henchman

== Production ==
Hula-La-La was filmed on May 25–29, 1951. It was the only Three Stooges film directed by producer Hugh McCollum, who gave the medium a shot while Edward Bernds was busy directing feature films. Bernds described McCollum's directing style as "gentle and tasteful", like McCollum himself. However, film author Ted Okuda believed this hurt his films, not allowing them to reach their full potential. Hula-La-La was cited as an example of suffering from moments of restraint, resulting in several scenes lacking their comedic punch.

The standard "Three Blind Mice" theme is replaced during the end titles with a hula composition entitled "Lu-Lu." The tune was written by Columbia Pictures composers Ross DiMaggio and Nico Grigor.
