= Cactus Makes Perfect =

1942 American short film by Del Lord

- Theatrical release poster
- Directed by: Del Lord
- Written by: Monte Collins; Elwood Ullman
- Produced by: Del Lord; Hugh McCollum
- Starring: Moe Howard; Larry Fine; Curly Howard; Vernon Dent; Eddie Laughton; Monte Collins; Ernie Adams
- Cinematography: Benjamin H. Kline
- Edited by: Jerome Thoms
- Distributed by: Columbia Pictures
- Release date: February 26, 1942 (U.S.)
- Running time: 17:18
- Country: United States
- Language: English

Cactus Makes Perfect is a 1942 short subject directed by Del Lord starring American slapstick comedy team The Three Stooges (Moe Howard, Larry Fine and Curly Howard). It is the 61st entry in the series released by Columbia Pictures starring the comedians, who released 190 shorts for the studio between 1934 and 1959.

== Plot ==
The film opens with the Stooges' mother attempting to wake up her three boys without success. "Get out of bed you lazy loafers!" she screams to no avail. Finally, she yanks a rope that leads from the kitchen to the bed where the trio is sleeping soundly. This causes the bed to spin horizontally until they fly off.

After a few mishaps, the trio finally makes their way downstairs. Curly receives a letter from the Inventors' Association, who state that his Gold Collar Button Retriever is "incomprehensible and utterly impractical." Naturally, Curly misinterprets this as a success, and the trio leave their mother's home to make their fortune.

In transit, they are swindled into buying a map leading to a lost mine in the Old West. After actually finding a lost mine, the Stooges run afoul of two down-on-their-luck prospectors after Curly fires an arrow from his Gold Collar Button Retriever. The two then try to rob the boys out of their dough.

Moe and Larry flee to a hotel in a ghost town where Curly hid the gold in a safe. The miners show up, and they all take refuge in the safe room. The miners drill through the door, which Curly attributes to termites, and throw a stick of dynamite in. After a little scuffle back and forth, the stick fizzles out. Believing it to be a dud, the boys burst out laughing and Curly chucks the dynamite, causing it to actually explode.

== Cast ==
=== Credited ===
- Moe Howard as Moe
- Larry Fine as Larry
- Curly Howard as Curly

=== Uncredited ===
- Monte Collins as Stooges' Mother
- Eddie Laughton as Gold Mine Salesman
- Vernon Dent as Heavyset Prospector
- Ernie Adams as Smaller Prospector

== Production notes ==
Filmed on August 7–11, 1941, the title Cactus Makes Perfect parodies the proverb "practice makes perfect."

Curly's remark, "I shoot an arrow into the air, where it lands I do not care: I get my arrows wholesale!" parodies Henry Wadsworth Longfellow's poem "The Arrow and the Song," which begins, "I shot an arrow into the air/It fell to earth, I knew not where..."
