= The Three Troubledoers =

1946 film by Edward Bernds

- Mistitled lobby card (The Troubledoers) for The Three Troubledoers
- Directed by: Edward Bernds
- Written by: Jack White
- Produced by: Hugh McCollum
- Starring: Moe Howard; Larry Fine; Curly Howard; Dick Curtis; Christine McIntyre; Victor Travers; Hank Bell; Ethan Laidlaw; Blackie Whiteford
- Cinematography: George F. Kelley
- Edited by: Henry Batista
- Distributed by: Columbia Pictures
- Release date: April 25, 1946 (U.S.)
- Running time: 17:14
- Country: United States
- Language: English

The Three Troubledoers is a 1946 short subject directed by Edward Bernds starring American slapstick comedy team The Three Stooges (Moe Howard, Larry Fine and Curly Howard). It is the 91st entry in the series released by Columbia Pictures starring the comedians, who released 190 shorts for the studio between 1934 and 1959.

== Plot ==
The Stooges are cowboys who come upon the town of Dead Man's Gulch where they find themselves embroiled in the turmoil orchestrated by the notorious outlaw Badlands Blackie and his gang. Their arrival coincides with the town's desperate plight, as Blackie threatens the local blacksmith's daughter, Nell, with dire consequences unless she agrees to marry him.

In an unexpected turn of events, the Stooges are thrust into positions of authority when the townsfolk appoint Curly as the new sheriff, with Moe and Larry serving as his deputies. Nell, seeking to rid herself of Blackie's tyranny, bargains with Curly, agreeing to marry him if he can rid the town of the outlaw's menace.

When the Stooges intercept the Justice of the Peace en route to officiate the wedding, Curly, assuming his role, attempts to disrupt the ceremony to buy time. However, his subterfuge is short-lived, resulting in his incarceration, symbolized by a collar tightly fastened around his neck.

As Blackie intensifies his demands for Nell's immediate compliance, threatening to spirit her away from Dead Man's Gulch, the Stooges mount a daring rescue mission. They crash the wedding proceedings, engaging in a chaotic showdown with Blackie and his henchmen, ultimately emerging victorious.

In the aftermath of the confrontation, Nell's father is liberated, but expresses his aversion to her marrying Curly. In a comedic twist, Curly, ever eager to comply with Nell's wishes, unwittingly offers a dynamite stick, prompting Nell to take action to prevent disaster, albeit at the expense of the Stooges, who hastily retreat from the ensuing chaos.

== Production notes ==
The Three Troubledoers was filmed on May 11–15, 1945, nearly a year prior to its release date. It was the last western-themed short starring Curly Howard and the tenth of sixteen Stooge shorts with the word "three" in the title.

=== Curly's illness ===
The Three Troubledoers was produced after Curly Howard suffered a mild stroke. As a result, his performance was marred by slurred speech, and slower timing. Though Curly's falsetto voice had deepened slightly by this point, the ailing star was comfortable enough to deliver his dialogue in his regular speaking voice. Director Edward Bernds later recalled how Curly's condition would have its peaks and valleys:

"...it was strange the way he (Curly) went up and down. In the order I shot the pictures, not in the order they were released, he was down for A Bird in the Head and The Three Troubledoers, he was up for Micro-Phonies, way down for Monkey Businessmen, and then up again, for the last time, in Three Little Pirates."

=== Moe's injury ===
The script for The Three Troubledoers called for a gag in which a bazooka gun was to backfire and shoot black soot into Moe's face. "The special effects man used too much air pressure," says director Edward Bernds, "so some of the soot shot up under his [Moe] eyelids. They had to pry his eyes open and remove these big chunks of black powder from his eye. I was terrified; I thought the poor guy had been blinded." Moe had a similar ordeal while filming 1939's Oily to Bed, Oily to Rise, when gobs of black goo (representing oil) shot under his eyelids.
