= Some More of Samoa =

1941 film by Del Lord

- Directed by: Del Lord
- Written by: Harry Edwards; Elwood Ullman
- Produced by: Del Lord; Hugh McCollum
- Starring: Moe Howard; Larry Fine; Curly Howard; Mary Ainslee; Symona Boniface; Louise Carver; Duke York; Dudley Dickerson; John Tyrrell
- Cinematography: L. William O'Connell
- Edited by: Burton Kramer
- Distributed by: Columbia Pictures
- Release date: December 4, 1941 (U.S.)
- Running time: 16:40
- Country: United States
- Language: English

Some More of Samoa is a 1941 short subject directed by Del Lord starring American slapstick comedy team The Three Stooges (Moe Howard, Larry Fine and Curly Howard). It is the 59th entry in the series released by Columbia Pictures starring the comedians, who released 190 shorts for the studio between 1934 and 1959.

== Plot ==
The Stooges are professional arborists commissioned by a wealthy elderly gentleman to procure a suitable companion for his prized puckerless persimmon tree. Embarking on a journey to the fictitious tropical island of Rhum-Boogie, the Stooges encounter adversity upon arrival, finding themselves captured by the indigenous inhabitants who threaten them with consumption unless Curly consents to marry the Chief's unattractive sibling.

Through resourcefulness and fortitude, the Stooges successfully evade captivity and secure the prized tree. However, their triumph is marred by a perilous encounter with an alligator, culminating in a precarious escape.

== Production notes ==
Some More of Samoa was filmed on May 12–15, 1941. The film's title is a self-contained pun, as "Samoa" is pronounced similarly to slurring "some more of" as "some mo' o'". The film is set on the fictional island of Rhum Boogie, not Samoa.

There are several continuity errors in Some More of Samoa. When Curly runs into the king's hut he is still covered with the flour sifted on him from when a cook is preparing the Stooges for dinner, but when he goes into the hut and tangles with the idol, the flour is gone. After he grabs the tree and runs off, the flour is back on. In addition, when Curly puts his head in the bag to answer the telephone, he starts whining before Moe actually closes the bag on his neck.

A very noticeable error is when Curly is about to be cooked and says "Soupbone" (just before pushing the cook into the boiling water), he has a large apple shoved into his mouth, yet his voice is heard clearly.

For a second time (after Movie Maniacs), Carnation milk ("from contented cows") is invoked. The natives of Rhum Boogie are described as living on "milk from contented coconuts."

When Moe and Larry run into a native and he introduces himself as "King Fisher" they reply with an Amos 'n Andy joke routine. Kingfish was a recurring character in the Amos 'n Andy radio show.

Some More of Samoa features a recurring gag often shown when the Stooges portray doctors or are mixing drinks, as in the films Men In Black and All Gummed Up. They stand in an assembly line formation and the first member (usually Moe) calls for a series of complex, often gibberish-sounding surgical tools or drink ingredients, with the other two repeating the orders and passing them to him. At a certain point, Moe will call for cotton, and be ignored at first, then angrily call for it again, prompting one of the other Stooges to retaliate and throw a large wad of wet cotton at Moe's face.
