= Cookoo Cavaliers =

1940 American short film by Jules White

- Directed by: Jules White
- Written by: Ewart Adamson
- Produced by: Jules White
- Starring: Moe Howard; Larry Fine; Curly Howard; Dorothy Appleby; Anita Garvin; Lynton Brent; Bob O'Connor; Blanche Payson; Estelita Zarco; Carmen Bailey; Blanca Vischer
- Cinematography: Henry Freulich
- Edited by: Art Seid
- Distributed by: Columbia Pictures
- Release date: November 15, 1940 (U.S.)
- Running time: 17:24
- Country: United States
- Language: English

Cookoo Cavaliers is a 1940 short subject directed by Jules White starring American slapstick comedy team The Three Stooges (Moe Howard, Larry Fine and Curly Howard). It is the 51st entry in the series released by Columbia Pictures starring the comedians, who released 190 shorts for the studio between 1934 and 1959.

== Plot ==
The Stooges encounter persistent challenges in their role as fishmongers in San Diego. Frustrated that there are no customers willing to buy their putrid, month-old wares, they decide to quit the business and acquire ownership of a saloon establishment. However, due to a misunderstanding, they mistakenly purchase a beauty salon in the tranquil village of Cucaracha, Mexico.

Undeterred by this unexpected development, the trio endeavors to provide services to their first customer, Rosita, offering her a mud pack purportedly composed of natural mud but in actuality containing cement.

Following an arduous process of removing the cement from Rosita's face, the Stooges attempt to bleach the hair of three additional Mexican patrons Juanita, Conchita & Pepita, albeit with an improvised concoction mistakenly combined with hair remover.

Their misadventures escalate when Señor Manuel, the employer of the afflicted patrons, confronts the Stooges, incensed by their actions toward Rosita and her counterparts. The Stooges escape from Señor Manuel and hastily flee the scene, dodging bullets fired by Rosita and her now bald-headed sisters.

== Production notes ==
Filmed on June 6–10, 1940, the working title of Cookoo Cavaliers was Beauty á la Mud.

In one scene where Moe throws a bottle of hair remover, the bottle breaks on a wall and spills on a dog. Curly cleans off the dog, yet we do not see the dog losing its hair. This was due to a continuity error and the scene was never resolved.

The "cookoo" in the title is often misspelled as "cuckoo."
