= Oily to Bed, Oily to Rise =

1939 film by Jules White

- Original lobby card
- Directed by: Jules White
- Written by: Andrew Bennison; Mauri Grashin
- Produced by: Jules White
- Starring: Moe Howard; Larry Fine; Curly Howard; Dick Curtis; Eddie Laughton; James Craig; Eva McKenzie; Dorothy Moore; Lorna Gray; Dorothy Comingore; Richard Fiske
- Cinematography: Henry Freulich
- Edited by: Charles Nelson
- Distributed by: Columbia Pictures
- Release date: October 6, 1939 (U.S.)
- Running time: 18:16
- Country: United States
- Language: English

Oily to Bed, Oily to Rise is a 1939 short subject produced and directed by Jules White starring American slapstick comedy team The Three Stooges (Moe Howard, Larry Fine and Curly Howard). It is the 42nd entry in the series released by Columbia Pictures starring the comedians, who released 190 shorts for the studio between 1934 and 1959.

== Plot ==
The Stooges are three hapless tramps. A farmer offers them a meal in exchange for cutting firewood, but after their ineptitude leads to the destruction of two saws they set off on foot. Curly's wish for a car is instantly fulfilled when they stumble upon what they believe to be a free car, which they take for a joyride. After nearly plunging over a cliff, they stop at a farmhouse at Curly's suggestion, hoping for a meal. Widow Jenkins graciously gives them a huge meal of chicken and dumplings—the very menu Curly had wished for. In gratitude, the Stooges offer to fix Widow Jenkins's broken outdoor water pump.

During the repair, they accidentally uncover oil beneath the farm, transforming the pump into a geyser that spews Curly high in the air. Despite their initial joy for the widow and her three daughters, they soon learn that she has been swindled out of her land by a trio of deceitful individuals. Curly's wish for an opportunity to serve justice on the swindlers is granted when they discover the three walking on the road. The crooks confront the Stooges—it is their car the Stooges have appropriated. After a hair-raising road chase with the swindlers, the Stooges manage to retrieve the deed to the land before it is recorded at the court house, and are allowed to marry the now wealthy Widow Jenkins' daughters.

== Cast ==
- Curly Howard as Curly
- Larry Fine as Larry
- Moe Howard as Moe
- Dorothy Comingore as June Jenkins
- James Craig as Swindler Driving Car
- Dick Curtis as Clipper - Swindler in Back Seat
- Richard Fiske as Mr. Johnson - Farmer
- Lorna Gray as May Jenkins
- Eddie Laughton as Briggs - Swindler in Front Seat
- Eva McKenzie as The Widow Jenkins
- Dorothy Moore as April Jenkins

== Production notes ==
Oily to Bed, Oily to Rise was filmed on March 16–20, 1939. The film's title is a parody of Benjamin Franklin's, "early to bed, early to rise, makes a man healthy, wealthy and wise."

Towards the end of the film, Moe tells Curly to wish for quintuplets and Curly responds that honeymooning in Canada with their new found loves is how to make the wish come true, a reference to the Dionne quintuplets.

The studio crew can be heard laughing when Curly accidentally hits his head on Widow Jenkins' kitchen door while trumpeting and singing "A-Pumping We Will Go."

The shot of Curly riding the oil gusher up into the sky would be reused in Oil's Well That Ends Well.

=== Moe's injury ===
Moe Howard recalled in his autobiography that he received a glob of goo (representing oil) directly under his eyelids during shooting:

I remember once when the prop man concocted a smorgasbord of gook: chocolate, whipped cream, asbestos chips, linseed oil, ketchup, and other unknown goodies. The plot had us in one scene trying to repair a water pump. After many attempts, I took a screwdriver, knelt down, peered into the mouth of the pump, and jiggled the screwdriver inside of it. Gazing up the opening, I jiggled again and then looked up a third time. Suddenly, a blob of assorted gunk got me right in the eye ... and ... it took hours to clean me up for the next scene.

Moe would have a similar ordeal while filming 1946's The Three Troubledoers, when chunks of black soot became lodged under his eyelids.
