= No Census, No Feeling =

1940 American short film by Del Lord

- Directed by: Del Lord
- Written by: Harry Edwards; Elwood Ullman
- Produced by: Del Lord; Hugh McCollum
- Starring: Moe Howard; Larry Fine; Curly Howard; Vernon Dent; Symona Boniface; Max Davidson; John Tyrrell; Bruce Bennett
- Cinematography: Lucien Ballard
- Edited by: Art Seid
- Distributed by: Columbia Pictures
- Release date: October 4, 1940 (U.S.)
- Running time: 16:29
- Country: United States
- Language: English

No Census, No Feeling is a 1940 short subject directed by Del Lord starring American slapstick comedy team The Three Stooges (Moe Howard, Larry Fine and Curly Howard). It is the 50th entry in the series released by Columbia Pictures starring the comedians, who released 190 shorts for the studio between 1934 and 1959.

== Plot ==
Following an altercation with a shopkeeper, the Stooges seek refuge in a revolving door, emerging with clipboards in hand, assuming their new roles as census takers.

Their first assignment leads them to the home of a socialite, where they unwittingly disrupt a bridge game by inadvertently adding Alum salt to a punch bowl, causing comedic chaos as everyone's lips pucker.

Undeterred, the Stooges press on in their census-taking endeavor, stumbling upon a football game where they attempt to interview the players. Resorting to unconventional methods, they disguise themselves as footballers and infiltrate the game, only to find themselves entangled in the match. In a bid to retrieve the ball and glean information, they resort to a chaotic sequence of events involving ice cream and a frenzied chase, ultimately fleeing the stadium pursued by the irate football team.

== Production notes ==
No Census, No Feeling was filmed on May 25–29, 1940. The film title is a parody on the expression "No sense, no feeling".

Curly confuses "census" for "the censor", thinking he is working for Will H. Hays.

In one scene, Curly believes that it is Independence Day in October, claiming that "you never can tell; look what they did to Thanksgiving!". This is a reference to an event in 1939 when Franklin Roosevelt moved Thanksgiving to an earlier Thursday in November to lengthen the Christmas shopping season. This act angered many and, after some time, the holiday ended up moving to the fourth Thursday of November which just happens to be on the last Thursday of November most years. In 1940 and 1941, the holiday was on the third Thursday of November.

A colorized version of this film was released in the 2004 DVD collection entitled "Stooged & Confoosed."
