= Gladys Gale =

American singer and actor (1891–1948)

- Screen capture of Gale with Moe Howard in the 1938 film short, Violent Is the Word for Curly.
- Born: Gladys Lanphere; January 15, 1891; Monmouth, Illinois, United States
- Died: October 4, 1948 (aged 57); Los Angeles, California, United States
- Occupation: Actress
- Years active: 1927–1946
- Spouse: Park Benjamin

Gladys Gale (January 15, 1891 – October 4, 1948) was an American nightclub singer and vaudeville performer, before becoming a character actress in films during the 1930s and 1940s. The wife of a millionaire, she led a checkered life before dying under mysterious circumstances in a Los Angeles hotel room under an assumed name.

== Life and early career ==
Born Gladys Lanphere on January 15, 1891, in Monmouth, Illinois, she married millionaire Park Benjamin. During the Prohibition Era she became a nightclub performer in a speakeasy in New York City, also appearing on the vaudeville stage in the late 1920s and early 1930s.

== Film career and death ==
Gale went to Hollywood in 1931, where she made her film debut in RKO's Smart Woman in a small role. She used the stage name of Gladys Gale, instead of her married name, Gladys Benjamin. Over her fifteen-year film career, she would appear in over 30 feature films, mostly in smaller roles, with the occasional featured part. Some of her more notable films include: the gangster film, She Couldn't Take It (1934), starring George Raft and Joan Bennett; the Mae West 1936 vehicle, Klondike Annie, in which she played a dance hall girl at the age of 45; Frank Capra's 1938 classic, Mr. Smith Goes to Washington, starring James Stewart, Jean Arthur, and Claude Rains; and the 1942 melodrama, Lady for a Night, starring John Wayne and Joan Blondell. Her final screen appearance would be in a small role in Our Hearts Were Growing Up (1946), which starred Gail Russell.

On October 3, 1948, Gale checked into a Los Angeles hotel under an assumed name with a man, calling themselves Mr. and Mrs. Statler. In the morning her body was discovered, nude, with the room trashed. No cause for her death was ever established. Gale is buried in Hollywood Forever Cemetery.

== Filmography ==
Gladys Gale filmography
Year	Title	Role	Notes	Ref(s)
1931	Smart Woman	Mrs. Preston - Peggy's Mother	RKO Pictures	
1932	The Music Box	Mrs. von Schwarzenhoffen (uncredited)	MGM; Laurel and Hardy short film comedy	
1934	Broadway Bill	Head nurse	Columbia Pictures	
1934	Desirable	large woman	Warner Bros. Pictures	
1934	Wake Up and Dream	Prima donna	Universal Pictures	
1934	The Party's Over	Patron in Art Gallery (uncredited)	Columbia Pictures	
1934	Among the Missing	Mrs. Randall	Columbia Pictures	
1934	Fugitive Lady	Miss Smith	Columbia Pictures	
1934	Men of the Night	Mrs. Everett	Columbia Pictures	
1934	The Captain Hates the Sea	Passenger's wife	Columbia Pictures	
1935	Circus Shadows		Peerless Pictures Studios	
1935	A Feather in Her Hat		Columbia Pictures	
1935	Love Me Forever		Columbia Pictures	
1935	She Couldn't Take It		Columbia Pictures	
1935	Carnival	Baby judge	Columbia Pictures	
1935	Men of the Hour		Columbia Pictures	
1935	She Married Her Boss		Columbia Pictures	
1936	Klondike Annie	Dance hall girl	Paramount Pictures; Screenplay by Mae West who also starred	
1936	Navy Born		Republic Pictures	
1936	Pride of the Marines	Woman manager	Columbia Pictures	
1936	Dancing Feet	Mrs. Blane	Republic Pictures	
1936	Counterfeit	Tourist	Columbia Pictures	
1937	45 Fathers		20th Century Fox	
1937	The Devil Is Driving		Columbia Pictures	
1937	I Promise to Pay	Receptionist	Columbia Pictures	
1937	Find the Witness	Mrs. Rice	Columbia Pictures	
1938	Up the River	Bingo player	20th Century Fox	
1939	Mr. Smith Goes to Washington	Committee Woman	Columbia Pictures	
1942	Joan of Ozark	Mrs. Fadden	Republic Pictures	
1942	Lady for a Night	Mother	Republic Pictures	
1943	So's Your Uncle	Elastic woman	Universal Pictures	
1945	An Angel Comes to Brooklyn	Sarah Gibbons	Republic Pictures	
1945	Billy Rose's Diamond Horseshoe	Unknown	20th Century Fox	
1945	Our Hearts Were Growing Up	Mrs. Appley	Paramount Pictures	

== Stage ==
Broadway credits of Gladys Benjamin (Gale)
Date	Title	Role	Ref(s)
Oct 02, 1912 - Oct 19, 1912	The Charity Girl	Madame Bowwowski	
Dec 30, 1912 - Apr 05, 1913	All for the Ladies	Chorus	
Mar 30, 1914 - May 09, 1914	The Belle of Bond Street	Hilda	
Feb 17, 1916 - Jun 10, 1916	Robinson Crusoe, Jr.	Chorus	
