= Three Sappy People =

1939 film by Jules White

- Directed by: Jules White
- Written by: Clyde Bruckman
- Produced by: Jules White
- Starring: Moe Howard; Larry Fine; Curly Howard; Lorna Gray; Don Beddoe; Bud Jamison; Ann Doran; Richard Fiske
- Cinematography: George Meehan
- Edited by: Charles Nelson
- Distributed by: Columbia Pictures
- Release date: December 1, 1939 (U.S.)
- Running time: 17:19
- Country: United States
- Language: English

Three Sappy People is a 1939 short subject directed by Jules White starring American slapstick comedy team The Three Stooges (Moe Howard, Larry Fine and Curly Howard). It is the 43rd entry in the series released by Columbia Pictures starring the comedians, who released 190 shorts for the studio between 1934 and 1959.

== Plot ==
The Stooges are phone repairmen working in the office of the esteemed psychiatrists, Drs. Z. Ziller, X. Zeller, and Y. Zoller. When wealthy patron J. Rumsford Rumford calls the doctors' office offering to pay handsomely for psychiatric treatment of his spirited wife, Sherry Rumford, the Stooges intercept the call and are mistaken for the doctors. Badly in need of money, they resolve to impersonate Drs. Ziller, Zeller, and Zoller.

Mrs. Rumford's erratic behavior has included refusing to attend parties, professing boredom, and driving through the house in her car. However, she takes an immediate liking to the Stooges, who arrive at the Rumford home on a triplet tandem bicycle. During the course of their appointment, the Stooges disrupt a formal dinner gathering, instigating a chaotic food altercation in their characteristic manner. Despite the commotion, the unorthodox behavior of the Stooges amuses Mrs. Rumford, leading her husband to conclude that her ailment has been remedied.

Consequently, the Stooges are generously compensated for their purported therapeutic intervention.

== Production notes ==
Three Sappy People was filmed on April 6–10, 1939. The film's title is a parody of the song title "Two Sleepy People." The short is also the sixth of sixteen Stooge shorts with the word "three" in the title.

During the pastry fight, 22-year-old Lorna Gray was treated on the set after a cream puff became lodged in her throat. However, in an interview later in her life, Gray stated that she actually was not in any danger and that it was instead director Jules White who was so concerned that he nearly ruined the take.
