= Curly Howard =

American comedian and actor (1903–1952)

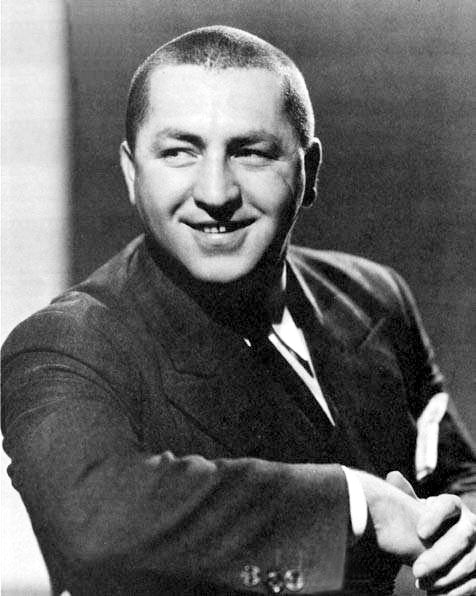
- Howard c. 1940s
- Born: Jerome Lester Horwitz; October 22, 1903; Brooklyn, New York, U.S.
- Died: January 18, 1952 (aged 48); San Gabriel, California, U.S.
- Resting place: Home of Peace Cemetery, Los Angeles, California, U.S.
- Other names: Jerry Howard; Jerome Howard; Babe
- Occupations: Comedian; actor
- Years active: 1928–1948
- Spouses: Julia Rosenthal (m. 1930; div. 1931); Elaine Ackerman (m. 1937; div. 1940); Marion Buxbaum (m. 1945; div. 1946); Valerie Newman (m. 1947)
- Children: 2
- Relatives: Moe Howard (brother); Shemp Howard (brother); Joan Howard Maurer (niece)
- Website: ThreeStooges.com

Jerome Howard (born Jerome Lester Horwitz; October 22, 1903 – January 18, 1952), better known by his stage name Curly Howard, (Note: In earlier shorts, it was spelled "Curley".) was an American comedian and actor. He was a member of The Three Stooges comedy team, which also featured his elder brothers Moe and Shemp Howard, as well as vaudevillian Larry Fine. In early shorts, he was billed as "Curley". He was generally considered the most popular and recognizable of the Stooges.

He was known for his high-pitched voice, odd vocal expressions, and non-rhotic dialect ("nyuk-nyuk-nyuk!", "woob-woob-woob!", "soitenly!" [certainly], "I'm a victim of soikemstance" [circumstance], and barking like a dog), as well as his physical comedy (e.g., falling on the ground and pivoting on his shoulder as he "walked" in circular motion), improvisations, and athleticism. An untrained actor, Curly borrowed (and significantly exaggerated) the "woob woob" from "nervous" comedian Hugh Herbert. Curly's unique version of "woob, woob, woob" was firmly established by the time of the Stooges' second Columbia film, Punch Drunks (1934).

Howard left the Three Stooges in May 1946 when a stroke ended his show business career. He suffered serious health problems and several more strokes until his death in 1952 at age 48.

== Early life ==
Howard was born Jerome Lester Horwitz in the Bensonhurst section of Brooklyn, New York, on October 22, 1903. Of Lithuanian Jewish ancestry, he was the youngest of the five sons of Jennie (Gorovitz) and Solomon Horwitz. Because he was the youngest, his brothers called him "Babe" (a nickname he retained his entire life). When his elder brother Shemp married Gertrude Frank, who was also nicknamed "Babe", the brothers dubbed him "Curly" to avoid confusion. His full formal Hebrew name was "Yehudah Leib bar Shlomo Natan HaLevi".

A quiet child, Howard rarely caused problems for his parents (something in which older brothers Moe and Shemp excelled). He was a mediocre student, but excelled as an athlete on the school basketball team. He did not graduate high school; instead, he kept himself busy with odd jobs and constantly following his older brothers, whom he idolized. He was also an accomplished ballroom dancer and singer, and regularly turned up at the Triangle Ballroom in Queens, occasionally bumping into actor George Raft.

When Howard was 13, he accidentally shot himself in the left ankle while cleaning a rifle. Moe rushed him to the hospital, saving his life, but the wound resulted in a noticeably thinner left leg and a slight limp. Curly was so afraid of surgery that he never had the limp corrected. While with the Stooges, he developed his famous exaggerated walk to conceal the limp on screen.

Howard was interested in music and comedy, and watched his brothers Shemp and Moe perform as stooges in Ted Healy's vaudeville act. He also liked to hang around backstage, although he never participated in any of the routines.

== Career ==
=== The Three Stooges ===
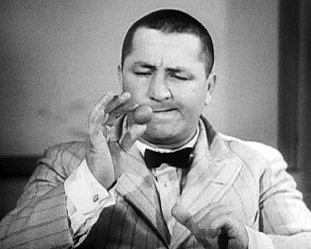
Curly playing with bubblegum in Disorder in the Court in 1936

Howard's first on-stage appearance was as a comedy musical conductor in 1928 for the Orville Knapp orchestra; Howard would conduct the ensemble with his arms flailing, unaware that he was losing his pants. Moe later recalled that his performances usually overshadowed those of the band. Though he enjoyed the gig, he watched as brothers Moe and Shemp with partner Larry Fine made it big as some of Ted Healy's "Stooges". Vaudeville star Healy had a very popular stage act, in which he would try to tell jokes or sing, only to have his noisy assistants (or "stooges", in show-business parlance) wander on stage and interrupt or heckle him and cause disturbances from the audience. Meanwhile, Healy and company appeared in their first feature film, Rube Goldberg's Soup to Nuts (1930).

Shemp Howard, however, soon tired of Healy's abrasiveness, bad temper, and alcoholism. In 1932, he was offered a contract at the Vitaphone Studios in Brooklyn. With Shemp gone, Moe suggested that his kid brother Jerry could fill the third-stooge role, and Jerry ran through his Orville Knapp act but Healy was unimpressed: "Is that all he can do? Let his pants fall down? Get me a real comedian, not this amateur. He doesn't even look right!" Healy felt that Jerry, with his thick, chestnut hair and elegant waxed mustache, looked too good for a low comedian. Howard left the room and returned minutes later with his head shaven (the mustache remained very briefly). Moe and Larry started improvising with this new character:

Moe: Hey, Curly!

Larry: What did you call him?

Moe: Curly.

Larry: That's all right. I thought you said girlie!

That exchange sold the act to Healy, and Jerry Horwitz became Curly Howard. In one of the few interviews Curly Howard gave in his lifetime, he complained about the loss of his hair: "I had to shave it off right down to the skin."

In 1934, MGM was building Healy up as a solo comedian in feature films, and Moe saw the writing on the wall. Healy alone was under contract to the studio; his Stooges answered to Healy, who paid each of them only $100 a week. When Healy's lucrative MGM contract was up for renewal on March 6, 1934, Moe proposed that Healy and his stooges should split: "Let's just break up. No hard feelings, no sneaking around. Just a good, clean split." Healy agreed, and left to pursue his own career. That same year, with "The Three Stooges" as the act's new name, they signed to appear in two-reel comedy short subjects for Columbia Pictures. Their third short, Men in Black, was nominated for the "Best Short Subject" Academy Award. It lost to the pioneer Technicolor featurette La Cucaracha, but it did establish The Three Stooges as new comedy stars. It also won the Stooges movie-star salaries: Columbia paid each of them $2,500 per short subject (an exceptional sum; Columbia usually paid $500 to $1,000 per short). The Stooges soon became the studio's most popular short-subject attraction, with Curly playing an integral part in the trio's work.

==== Prime years ====
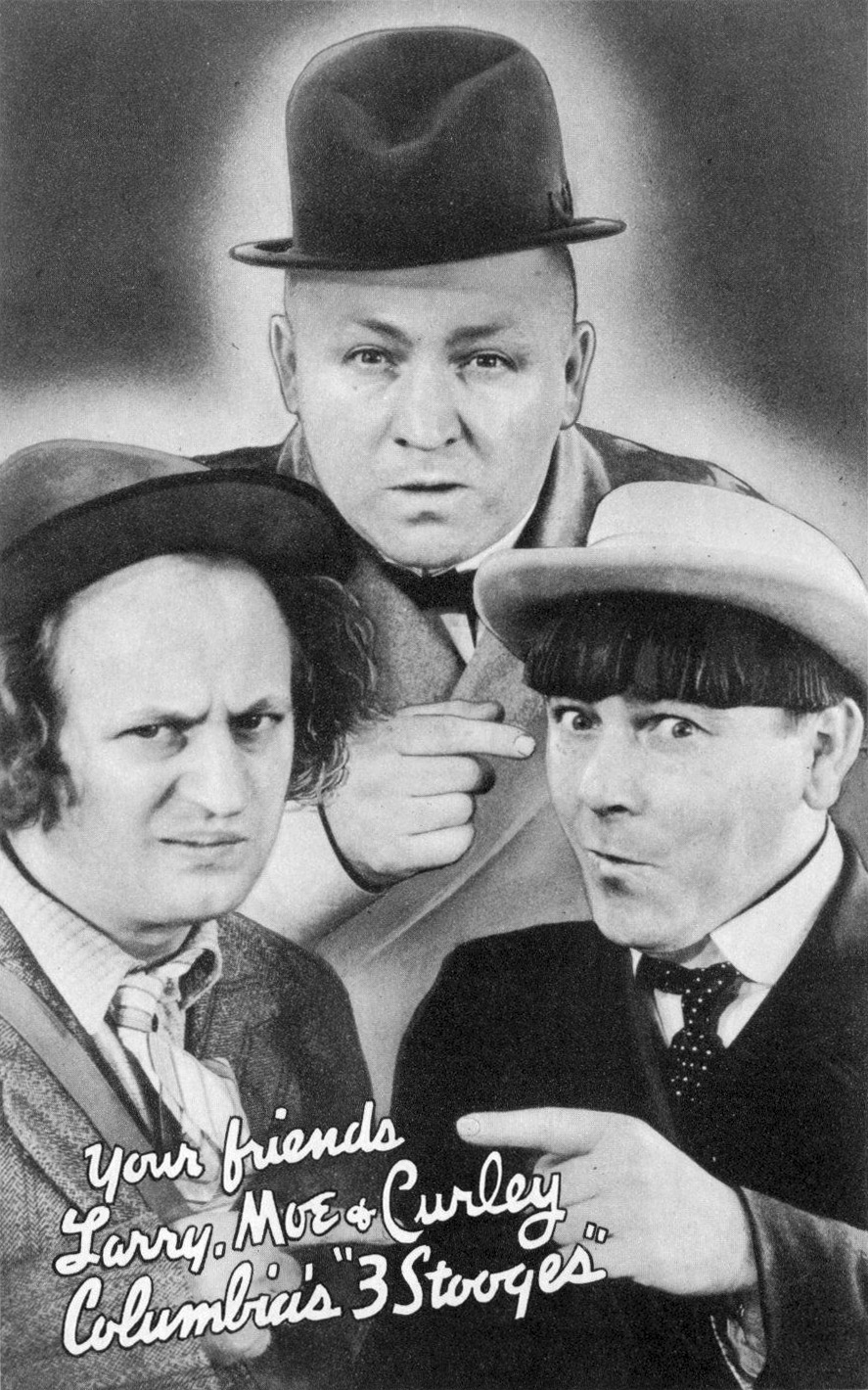
Left to right: Larry Fine, Howard, and Moe Howard in 1937

Howard's childlike mannerisms and natural comedic charm made him a hit with audiences, particularly children. He was known in the act for having an "indestructible" head, which always won out by breaking anything that assaulted it, including saws and hammers (resulting in his characteristic quip, "Oh, look!" when the item is shown damaged while his head is intact). Although Howard had no formal acting training, his comedic skills were exceptional. Often, directors let the camera roll freely and let Howard improvise. Jules White, in particular, left gaps in the Stooges scripts where he could improvise for several minutes. In later years, White commented: "If we wrote a scene and needed a little something extra, I'd say to Curly, 'Look, we've got a gap to fill this in with a "woo-woo" or some other bit of business', and he never disappointed us."

By the time the Stooges hit their peak in the late 1930s, their films had almost become vehicles for Curly Howard's unbridled comic performances. Such Stooges classics as A Plumbing We Will Go (1940), We Want Our Mummy (1938), An Ache in Every Stake (1941), and Cactus Makes Perfect (1942) display his ability to take inanimate objects (food, tools, pipes, etc.) and turn them into ingenious comic props. Moe Howard later confirmed that when Curly forgot his lines, that merely allowed him to improvise on the spot so that the "take" (or scene) could continue uninterrupted:

If we were going through a scene and Curly forgot his words for a moment, and then, you know, rather than stand, get pale and stop, you never knew what he was going to do. On one occasion, however, he would drop down to the floor and spin around ten times like a top until he finally remembered what he had to say.

Howard also developed a set of Brooklyn-accented reactions and expressions that the other Stooges would imitate long after he had left the act:

- "Nyuk, nyuk, nyuk" – his trademark laugh, accompanied by manic finger-snapping (snapping your fingers before cupping your hand and slapping the other hand down), often used to amuse himself
- "Woob, woob, woob!" – cheering used when he was either happy, scared, dazed, or flirting with a "dame"
- "Hmmm!" – an under-the-breath, high-pitched sound meant to express frustration
- "Nyahh-ahhh-ahhh!" – a scared reaction, which was most often used by the other Stooges after Curly's departure
- "Lah-dee" or simply "La, la, laaa" – his singing used when he was acting innocently right before taking out an enemy
- "Ruff! Ruff!" – a dog bark, used to express anger, showing defiance, barking at an attractive dame, and/or giving an enemy a final push before departing the scene
- "Ha-cha-cha!" – a take on Jimmy Durante's catchphrase
- "I'm a victim of soikemstance [circumstance]!" – used to deflect blame from himself
- "Soitenly!" ("certainly")
- "I'll moider (murder) you!"
- "Huff huff huff!" – sharp, huffing exhales either due to excitement or meant to provoke a foe
- "Ah-ba-ba-ba-ba-ba-ba!" – a sort of nonsense, high-pitched yelling that signified being scared or overly excited, which was used during his later years
- "Indubitably" – an expression used to feign an intelligent response
- Nervous teeth chattering, which made the sound of a small hammer striking a chisel
- "Oh! A WISE guy, eh?" – an annoyed response
- "Oh, look!" – a surprised remark, usually pointing out a saw or hammer which was damaged when it came into contact with his hard head.
- "Say a few syllables!" – to another (injured) Stooge, usually Moe
- Occasionally, the Stooges faced a problem that required deep thought, whereupon Curly would bang his head on a wall several times, then shout, "I got it! I got it!" Moe would ask, "What have you got?" Curly's answer: "A terrific headache."
- Despite his mispronunciations, he had an uncanny ability to instantly spell big words, such as "chrysanthemum", if asked. The gag was that Curly never did it when something important was at stake. In one scene, the Stooges were in a situation where this talent might have landed them a job, but Curly had missed his opportunity. Moe's reaction would be to growl, "Where were you a minute ago?" and then smack him.

On several occasions, Moe Howard was convinced that rising star Lou Costello (a close friend of Shemp's) was stealing material from his brother. Costello was known to acquire prints of the Stooges' films from Columbia Pictures on occasion, presumably to study him. Inevitably, Curly Howard's routines would appear in Abbott and Costello feature films, much to Moe's chagrin.

Curly was the only "third Stooge" who never made a series of his short films without Moe or Larry, either before joining the Stooges or after leaving. Shemp Howard, Joe Besser, and Joe DeRita (referred to during his tenure with the Stooges as "Curly-Joe") each starred as solo comedians in theatrical short subjects.

== Illness ==
=== Decline ===
By 1944, Curly Howard's energy began to wane. His performances in films such as Idle Roomers (1944) and Booby Dupes (1945) present a Curly whose voice was deeper and his actions were slower. It was believed that Howard suffered the first of several strokes between the production of Idiots Deluxe (October 1944) and If a Body Meets a Body (March 1945). During Curly's illness, producer-director Jules White salvaged an incomplete Curly performance by inserting sequences from an older film; Beer Barrel Polecats (1945) borrowed from So Long Mr. Chumps (1940). Following the completion of the feature-length Rockin' in the Rockies (December 1944), Moe Howard persuaded Curly to seek medical attention. He was admitted to Cottage Hospital in Santa Barbara, California, on January 23, 1945. There, he received diagnoses of severe hypertension, retinal hemorrhage, and obesity, necessitating a period of rest. Consequently, only five short films were released in 1945, a notable reduction from the usual six to eight per year.

In August 1945 the Stooges appeared in a Gale Storm musical feature, Swing Parade of 1946, co-produced at Monogram Pictures by the Stooges' agent, Harry A. Romm. Curly appears healthier and more animated than in his concurrent Columbia shorts, but from then on his health would fluctuate from film to film.

Despite Moe Howard's appeals to Harry Cohn to grant his brother an extended leave to recuperate, Cohn refused to disrupt the production schedule of the profitable Stooges shorts. The Stooges finally went on a hiatus of five months between August 1945 and January 1946, during which they spent three weeks working at Monogram for Swing Parade of 1946, and then undertook a demanding two-month schedule of live performances in New York City, performing daily. During this period, Howard met Marion Buxbaum, whom he married on October 17, 1945, after a two-week courtship.

Upon returning to Los Angeles in late November 1945, Howard's health had deteriorated significantly. Despite two months of relative rest, the team's 1946 production schedule at Columbia resumed in late January, involving only 24 days of filming between February and early May. Even with an additional eight weeks of leave during this timeframe, Howard's physical and mental state continued to decline.

By early 1946, Howard's voice had grown increasingly coarse, and he struggled to recall even the simplest dialogue. He exhibited significant weight loss and pronounced facial lines, reflecting the toll of his deteriorating health. His faculties wavered as the year progressed: sometimes he was sharp, sometimes he was slow. As director Edward Bernds recalled, "It was strange the way he went up and down. In the order I shot the pictures, not in the order they were released, he was down for A Bird in the Head and The Three Troubledoers, he was up for Micro-Phonies, way down for Monkey Businessmen and then up again, for the last time, in Three Little Pirates."

=== 1946 stroke ===
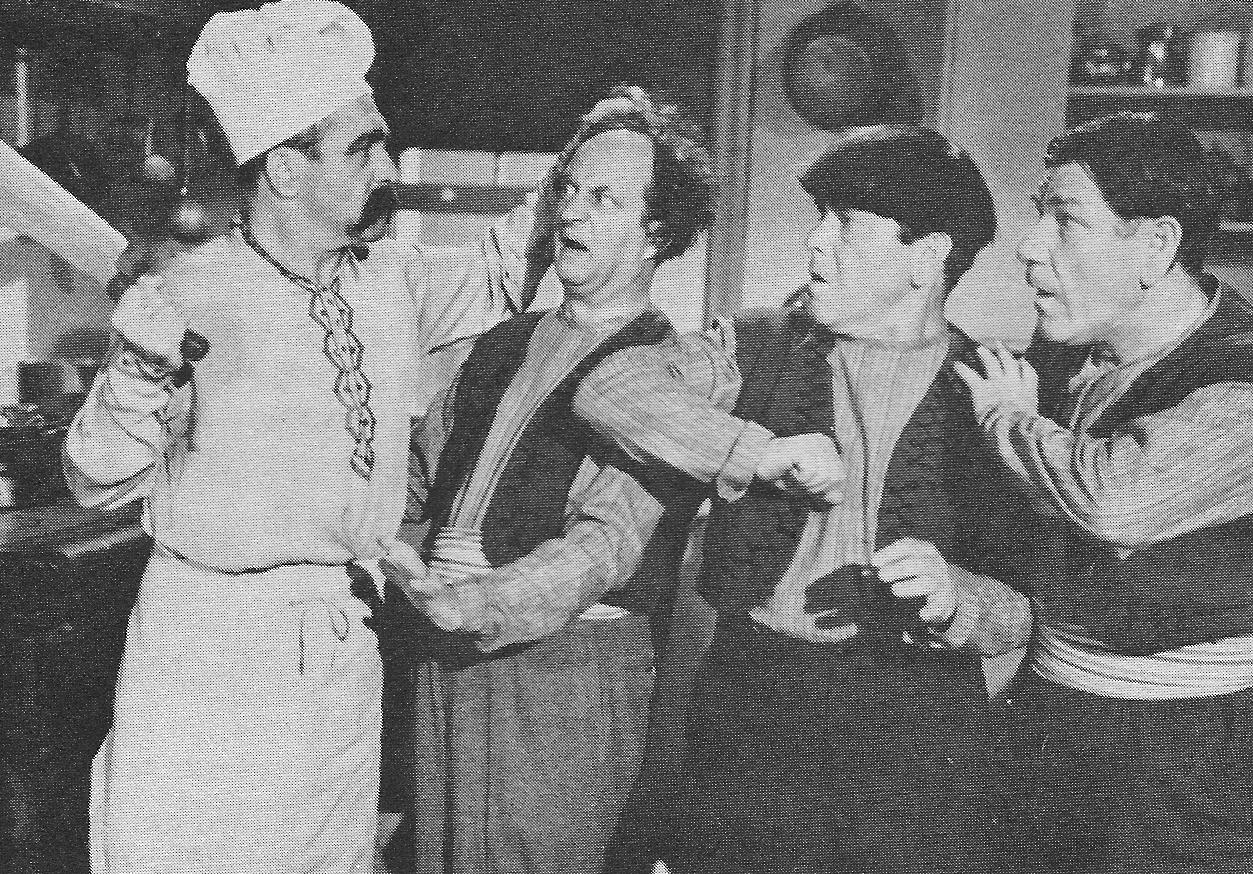
Curly as the cook, in a still from Curly's cut scene in Malice in the Palace in 1949

Half-Wits Holiday, released in 1947, was Curly Howard's final appearance as an official member of The Three Stooges. During filming on May 6, 1946, he suffered a severe stroke while sitting in director Jules White's chair, waiting to film the last scene. When called by the assistant director to take the stage, he did not answer. Moe looked for his brother; he found him with his head dropped to his chest. Moe later recalled that his mouth was distorted, and he was unable to speak, only able to cry. Moe immediately alerted White, who had to rework the scene quickly, dividing the action between Moe and Larry while Curly was rushed to the hospital, where Moe joined him after the filming. Howard spent several weeks at the Motion Picture Country House in Woodland Hills before returning home for further recovery.

In January 1946, Shemp Howard had been recruited to substitute for Curly during live performances in New Orleans. After Curly's stroke, Shemp agreed to replace him in the Columbia shorts, but only until his younger brother was well enough to rejoin the act. An extant copy of the Stooges' 1947 Columbia Pictures contract was signed by all four Stooges and stipulated that Shemp's joining "in place and stead of Jerry Howard" would be only temporary until Curly recovered sufficiently to return to work full-time. However, Curly's health continued to worsen and it became clear that he would not be returning. As a result, Shemp quietly replaced Curly, as noted by authors Okuda and Watz: "No official statement was issued to the press or exhibitors on Curly's condition or the fact that Shemp was replacing him."

Curly Howard, partially recovered and with his hair regrown, made a brief cameo appearance in January 1947 as a train passenger whooping and barking in his sleep in the third film after brother Shemp's return, Hold That Lion! (1947). It was the only film that featured Larry Fine and all three Howard brothers – Moe, Shemp, and Curly – simultaneously; director White later said he spontaneously staged the bit during Curly's impromptu visit to the soundstage: "It was a spur-of-the-moment idea. Curly was visiting the set; this was sometime after his stroke. Apparently he came in on his own, since I didn't see a nurse with him. He was sitting around, reading a newspaper. As I walked in, the newspaper he had in front of his face came down and he waved hello to me. I thought it would be funny to have him do a bit in the picture and he was happy to do it."

In June 1948, Howard filmed a second cameo as an angry chef for the short Malice in the Palace (1949), but due to his illness, his performance was not deemed good enough, and his scenes were cut. A lobby card for the short shows him with the other Stooges, although he never appeared in the final release.

=== Retirement ===
Still not fully recovered from his stroke, Howard met Valerie Newman and married her on July 31, 1947. A friend, Irma Leveton, later recalled, "Valerie was the only decent thing that happened to Curly and the only one that really cared about him." Although his health continued to decline after the marriage, Valerie gave birth to a daughter, Janie, in 1948.

Later that year, Howard suffered a second massive stroke, which left him partially paralyzed. He used a wheelchair by 1950 and was fed boiled rice and apples as part of his diet to reduce his weight (and blood pressure). Curly's condition failed to improve. Valerie admitted him into the Motion Picture & Television Fund's Country House and Hospital on August 29, 1950. He was released after several months of treatment and medical tests, although he returned periodically until his death.

In February 1951, Howard entered a nursing home, where he suffered another stroke a month later. In April, he went to live at the North Hollywood Hospital and Sanitarium.

=== Final months ===
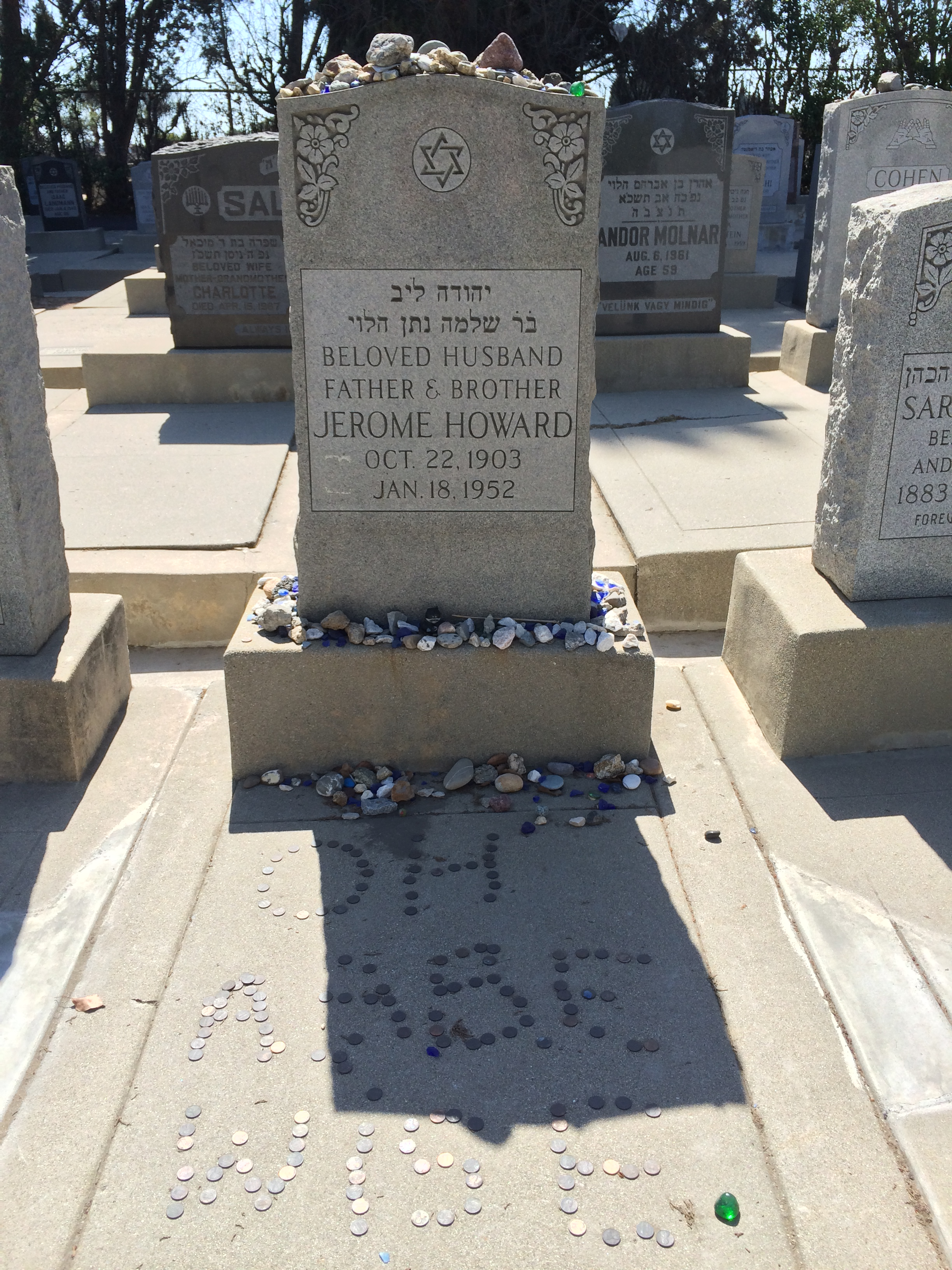
Grave of Curly Howard, at Home of Peace Cemetery in East Los Angeles, California

In December 1951, the North Hollywood Hospital and Sanitarium supervisor told the Howard family that Curly was becoming a problem to the nursing staff at the facility because of his mental deterioration. They admitted they could no longer care for him and suggested he be placed in a mental hospital. Moe refused and relocated him to the Baldy View Sanitarium in San Gabriel, California.

On January 7, 1952, Moe was contacted on the Columbia set while filming He Cooked His Goose to help move Curly for what would be the last time. This proved unsuccessful, and Curly died eleven days later, on January 18, 1952. He lived the shortest life of the Stooges, dying at the age of 48. He was given a Jewish funeral and was buried at the Western Jewish Institute section of Home of Peace Cemetery in East Los Angeles, California. His older brothers Shemp and Benjamin would also be interred there in 1955 and 1976 respectively, near parents Jennie and Solomon.

== Personal life ==
Offscreen, Howard's demeanor stood in stark contrast to his exuberant onscreen persona. A reserved and introspective individual, he largely avoided social interactions unless under the influence of alcohol, a habit that became more pronounced as the pressures of his career intensified. Howard rarely exhibited the boisterous behavior that defined his public image, except in the presence of family, while performing, or during episodes of inebriation. He was, however, widely recognized for his compassion, particularly his tendency to care for stray dogs.

Howard had four marriages and two children:

- Julia Rosenthal (m. August 5, 1930 – divorced January 6, 1931)
- Elaine Ackerman (m. June 7, 1937 – div. July 11, 1940)
  - Marilyn Howard Ellman (daughter, December 18, 1938 – May 6, 2025)
- Marion Buxbaum (m. October 17, 1945 – div. July 22, 1946)
- Valerie Newman (m. July 31, 1947 – January 18, 1952; his death)
  - Janie Howard Hanky (daughter, b. 1948)

Curly Howard's first marriage was short-lived, ending in divorce within five months and preceding his rise to fame with the Three Stooges. On June 7, 1937—the twelfth anniversary of his brother Moe's marriage to Helen Howard—Curly wed Elaine Ackerman. The union produced one daughter, Marilyn, in 1938, but the couple divorced in June 1940. Following the separation, Howard's health began to decline, marked by significant weight gain and the onset of hypertension.

Howard struggled with deep insecurities related to his shaved head, which he believed rendered him unattractive to women. To manage his feelings of inadequacy, he increasingly resorted to excessive drinking and indulgent social behavior. In public, he often wore a hat to project an image of masculinity, lamenting that his bare head made him feel juvenile. Despite his self-esteem issues, Howard remained highly popular with women, though many sought to exploit his generosity and affable nature.

Moe's son-in-law Norman Maurer noted "he was a pushover for women. If a pretty girl went up to him and gave him a spiel, Curly would marry her. Then she would take his money and run off. It was the same when a real estate agent would come up and say 'I have a house for you'; Curly would sell his current home and buy another one."

During World War II, the Stooges' filming schedule was suspended for seven months each year to facilitate personal appearances. During these periods, the trio frequently performed for service members, a demanding schedule that exacerbated Curly's deteriorating health. While Howard abstained from alcohol during performances, as Moe strictly prohibited it, his post-work activities often involved excessive indulgence in nightclubs, where he ate, drank, and socialized to cope with professional stress. Howard's financial habits were equally extravagant. He spent lavishly on wine, food, women, and real estate, frequently finding himself in precarious financial situations and often nearing bankruptcy. Moe Howard ultimately intervened to manage his brother's finances, assisting with budgeting and even preparing Curly's income tax returns.

Howard found solace in the companionship of dogs, frequently forming bonds with stray animals during the Stooges' travels. He often adopted homeless dogs encountered on tour, transporting them from town to town until suitable homes could be secured. When not engaged in performances, Howard maintained several pet dogs at his residence, reflecting his enduring affection for animals.

Moe urged Curly to find himself a wife, hoping it would persuade his brother to finally settle down and allow his health to improve somewhat. After a two-week courtship, he married Marion Buxbaum on October 17, 1945, a union that lasted nine months. The divorce proceeding was bitter, exacerbated by exploitative, sensationalist media coverage, which worsened his already fragile health. The divorce was finalized in July 1946, two months after he suffered his career-ending stroke.

On July 31, 1947, he married Valerie Newman. They had one daughter, Janie (born in 1948), and remained married until his death.

== Legacy ==
Curly Howard is considered by many fans and critics alike to be their favorite member of the Three Stooges. In a 1972 interview; Larry Fine recalled, "Personally, I thought Curly was the greatest because he was a natural comedian who had no formal training. Whatever he did, he made up on the spur of the moment. When we lost Curly, we took a hit." Curly's mannerisms, behavior, and personality along with his catchphrases have become a part of American popular culture. Steve Allen called him one of the "few true but seldom recognized comedy geniuses."

The Ted Okuda-Edward Watz book The Columbia Comedy Shorts puts Howard's appeal and legacy in critical perspective: "Few comics have come close to equaling the pure energy and genuine sense of fun Curly was able to project. He was merriment personified, a creature of frantic action whose only concern was to satisfy his immediate cravings. Allowing his emotions to dominate, and making no attempt whatsoever to hide his true feelings, he would chuckle self-indulgently at his own cleverness. When confronted with a problem, he would grunt, slap his face, and tackle the obstacle with all the tenacity of a six-year-old child.

== In popular culture ==
- The titular character of the Hanna-Barbera Saturday-morning cartoon series, Jabberjaw, was modeled after Curly. The character was voiced by Frank Welker.
- John Candy played Curly in three sketches on the TV series SCTV as part of a "Three Dummies" short that aired in the "Muley's Roundhouse" sketch. The comedy bits involved: the tetchy host of an afternoon kids' show (Season 1, ep. 23, airing Nov. 21 and 25, 1977); a parody commercial for a mail-order record of Curly "singing" songs such as "Love Theme from Romeo and Juliet", "Theme from The Graduate" (actually "Mrs. Robinson" by Simon & Garfunkel), "The Godfather" theme, and "The Thomas Crown Affair" (actually "The Windmills of Your Mind") (Season 5, ep. 4, airing Nov. 26, 1982); and Curly being picked up by Melvin Dumar and forced to sing in a parody promo for Melvin and Howard (Season 4, ep. 3, airing May 29, 1981.)
- The ABC TV sketch-comedy series Fridays (ABC, 1980–82) featured an occasional skit of "The Numb Boys" – essentially a Stooges routine related to a recent news topic – with John Roarke playing Curly, Bruce Mahler as Moe, and Larry David as Larry.
- Curly's legend far outlived him when the otherwise-obscure country-pop Jump 'n the Saddle Band scored one of the biggest novelty hits of the 1980s with their 1983 single, "The Curly Shuffle". The video featured some of Curly's best scenes. One band member claimed they watched hundreds of hours' worth of Three Stooges films to find the right clips.
- In the JAG episode "Cowboys and Cossacks", the Russian sailors mimic Curly when the Three Stooges are mentioned.
- In Futurama, the character Zoidberg often makes a high-pitched "whooping" sound similar to the one made by Curly.
- In the Simpsons episode "Last Exit to Springfield", Homer celebrates Mr Burns' proposition (agreeing to meet the union's demands if Homer resigns as union president) by falling to the floor and walking in a circular motion, one of Curly's signature moves.
- In 2000, longtime Stooges fan Mel Gibson produced a television film for ABC about the lives and careers of the Stooges. In an interview promoting the film, he said Curly was his favorite of the Stooges. In the film; Curly was played by Michael Chiklis.
- In the 2012 Farrelly brothers' film The Three Stooges, Will Sasso portrays Curly Howard. Robert Capron portrays young Curly.
- In the children's novel series Captain Underpants and its film adaptation, the elementary school that the main characters attend is named Jerome Horwitz Elementary School, in Howard's honor.
- One of Curly's grandsons, Bradley Server, performs at Stooges tribute shows under the moniker "Curly G", and has a YouTube channel named "Curly's Grandson".

== Filmography ==
=== Features ===
All are guest appearances except the compilation feature Stop! Look! and Laugh!; the Stooges never starred in their own feature film during Curly Howard's lifetime.

- Turn Back the Clock (1933)
- Broadway to Hollywood (1933)
- Meet the Baron (1933)
- Dancing Lady (1933)
- Myrt and Marge (1933)
- Fugitive Lovers (1934)
- Hollywood Party (1934)
- The Captain Hates the Sea (1934)
- Start Cheering (1938)
- Time Out for Rhythm (1941)
- My Sister Eileen (1942)
- Good Luck, Mr. Yates (1943) (scenes deleted but included in Gents Without Cents)
- Rockin' in the Rockies (1945)
- Swing Parade of 1946 (1946)
- Stop! Look! and Laugh! (1960) (scenes from Stooge shorts)

=== Short subjects ===
- Nertsery Rhymes (1933)
- Beer and Pretzels (1933)
- Hello Pop! (1933)
- Plane Nuts (1933)
- Roast Beef and Movies (1934)
- Jail Birds of Paradise (1934)
- Hollywood on Parade # B-9 (1934)
- Woman Haters (1934) (*credited as "Curley")
- The Big Idea (1934)
- Punch Drunks (1934) (*credited as "Curley")
- Men in Black (1934)
- Three Little Pigskins (1934)
- Horses' Collars (1935)
- Restless Knights (1935)
- Screen Snapshots Series 14, No. 6 (1935)
- Pop Goes the Easel (1935)
- Uncivil Warriors (1935)
- Pardon My Scotch (1935)
- Hoi Polloi (1935)
- Three Little Beers (1935)
- Ants in the Pantry (1936)
- Movie Maniacs (1936)
- Screen Snapshots Series 15, No. 7 (1936)
- Half Shot Shooters (1936)
- Disorder in the Court (1936)
- A Pain in the Pullman (1936)
- False Alarms (1936)
- Whoops, I'm an Indian! (1936)
- Slippery Silks (1936)
- Grips, Grunts and Groans (1937)
- Dizzy Doctors (1937)
- Three Dumb Clucks (1937)
- Back to the Woods (1937)
- Goofs and Saddles (1937)
- Cash and Carry (1937)
- Playing the Ponies (1937)
- The Sitter Downers (1937)
- Termites of 1938 (1938)
- Wee Wee Monsieur (1938)
- Tassels in the Air (1938)
- Healthy, Wealthy and Dumb (1938)
- Violent Is the Word for Curly (1938)
- Three Missing Links (1938)
- Mutts to You (1938)
- Flat Foot Stooges (1938)
- Three Little Sew and Sews (1939)
- We Want Our Mummy (1939)
- A Ducking They Did Go (1939)
- Screen Snapshots: Stars on Horseback (1939)
- Yes, We Have No Bonanza (1939)
- Saved by the Belle (1939)
- Calling All Curs (1939)
- Oily to Bed, Oily to Rise (1939)
- Three Sappy People (1939)
- You Nazty Spy! (1940)
- Screen Snapshots: Art and Artists (1940)
- Rockin' thru the Rockies (1940)
- A Plumbing We Will Go (1940)
- Nutty But Nice (1940)
- How High Is Up? (1940)
- From Nurse to Worse (1940)
- No Census, No Feeling (1940)
- Cookoo Cavaliers (1940)
- Boobs in Arms (1940)
- So Long Mr. Chumps (1941)
- Dutiful But Dumb (1941)
- All the World's a Stooge (1941)
- I'll Never Heil Again (1941)
- An Ache in Every Stake (1941)
- In the Sweet Pie and Pie (1941)
- Some More of Samoa (1941)
- Loco Boy Makes Good (1942)
- What's the Matador? (1942)
- Cactus Makes Perfect (1942)
- Matri-Phony (1942)
- Three Smart Saps (1942)
- Even as IOU (1942)
- Sock-a-Bye Baby (1942)
- They Stooge to Conga (1943)
- Dizzy Detectives (1943)
- Spook Louder (1943)
- Back from the Front (1943)
- Three Little Twirps (1943)
- Higher Than a Kite (1943)
- I Can Hardly Wait (1943)
- Dizzy Pilots (1943)
- Phony Express (1943)
- A Gem of a Jam (1943)
- Crash Goes the Hash (1944)
- Busy Buddies (1944)
- The Yoke's on Me (1944)
- Idle Roomers (1944)
- Gents Without Cents (1944)
- No Dough Boys (1944)
- Three Pests in a Mess (1945)
- Booby Dupes (1945)
- Idiots Deluxe (1945)
- If a Body Meets a Body (1945)
- Micro-Phonies (1945)
- Beer Barrel Polecats (1946)
- A Bird in the Head (1946)
- Uncivil War Birds (1946)
- The Three Troubledoers (1946)
- Monkey Businessmen (1946)
- Three Loan Wolves (1946)
- G.I. Wanna Home (1946)
- Rhythm and Weep (1946)
- Three Little Pirates (1946)
- Half-Wits Holiday (1947)
- Hold That Lion! (1947) (cameo appearance)
- Malice in the Palace (1949) (cameo appearance, deleted)
- Booty and the Beast (1953, recycled footage from Hold That Lion!, posthumous release)
