= Calling All Curs =

1939 film by Jules White

- Directed by: Jules White
- Screenplay by: Elwood Ullman; Searle Kramer
- Story by: Thea Goodan
- Produced by: Jules White
- Starring: Moe Howard; Larry Fine; Curly Howard; Lynton Brent; Cy Schindell; Isabelle LaMal; Beatrice Curtis; Libby Taylor
- Edited by: Charles Nelson
- Distributed by: Columbia Pictures
- Release date: August 25, 1939 (U.S.)
- Running time: 17:19
- Country: United States
- Language: English

Calling All Curs is a 1939 short subject directed by Jules White starring American slapstick comedy team The Three Stooges (Moe Howard, Larry Fine and Curly Howard). It is the 41st entry in the series released by Columbia Pictures starring the comedians, who released 190 shorts for the studio between 1934 and 1959.

== Plot ==
The Stooges are skilled veterinarians, entrusted with the care of Garçon, an esteemed poodle belonging to socialite Mrs. Bedford. Following a successful surgical intervention to remove a thorn from Garçon's paw, the Stooges are visited by two ostensibly benign reporters from The Daily Star, who express interest in featuring the clinic in their publication. The Stooges give the pair a tour of the facility.

The faux reporters are in fact dognapping criminals. When momentarily left unchaperoned, they steal Garçon, leaving behind a ransom note. The Stooges resolve to find the missing dog, but in the meantime they plan to conceal their negligence from Mrs. Bedford by delivering to her a substitute mutt disguised as Garçon.

They subterfuge fails when the dog's glued-on hair falls off during an interaction with Mrs. Bedford's maid. Faced with the imminent threat of incarceration, the Stooges embark on a desperate quest to apprehend the perpetrators, employing the substitute mutt as a makeshift bloodhound to trail the dognappers to their lair. A confrontation ensues, culminating in a triumph for the Stooges. Garçon is found, together with an unexpected litter of puppies.

== Production notes ==
Filmed on December 27–30, 1938, the title Calling All Curs is a pun on the phrase "Calling all cars!" A colorized version of this film was released in 2006 as part of the DVD collection entitled "Stooges on the Run."

Garçon gives birth at the end of the short, and is referred to by feminine pronouns throughout. Garçon is French for “boy.”

This marks one of the few times the Stooges have respectable, professional careers as opposed to working as blue-collar laborers.

This was one of Curly Howard's favorite Stooge films as he was a well-known dog lover.

Footage was reused in the 1960 compilation feature film Stop! Look! and Laugh!

== Quotes ==
- Moe (to the Garçon in disguise): "Listen, bloodhound! If you got any 'blood' in you, you'd better start pointing and point out those dognappers! Get the point?!"
- Curly: "Hmmm, n'yuk, n'yuk n'yuk. He must be a Pointsetter." (referring to the Poinsettia flower) also "I'm trying to think but nothing happens!"
- Moe: "Quiet, you hot air-dale!" (referring to an Airedale Terrier and making a pun on the phrase "hot air" as in "empty talk intended to impress")
