= Edward Bernds =

American film director (1905–2000)

- Born: July 12, 1905; Chicago, Illinois, U.S.
- Died: May 20, 2000 (aged 94); Van Nuys, California, U.S.
- Occupations: Film director, screenwriter
- Years active: 1929–1965

Edward Bernds (July 12, 1905 – May 20, 2000) was an American screenwriter and director, born in Chicago, Illinois.

== Career ==
While in his junior year in Lake View High School, he and several friends formed a small radio clique and obtained amateur licenses. In the early 1920s, there was considerable prestige for amateur operators to have commercial radio licenses, and Bernds was in a good position to enter broadcasting when he graduated in 1923, a year when radio stations began to be established all over Chicago. He found employment — at age 20 — as chief operator at Chicago's WENR.

When talking pictures began in the late 1920s, Bernds and broadcast operators like him relocated to Hollywood to work as sound technicians in "the talkies". After a brief period at United Artists, Bernds resigned and worked at Columbia Pictures, where he functioned as sound engineer on many of Frank Capra's classics in the 1930s. He soon established himself as Columbia's best recording technician.

== Directing the Three Stooges ==
Bernds wanted to be a director, but could not work up the nerve to approach Columbia president Harry Cohn about the reassignment. Frank Capra ran into Bernds one day, and made Bernds a promise to talk with Cohn that evening. Cohn, although well aware of Bernds's prowess in the sound department, grudgingly granted Bernds's wish. His first directorial assignment was a public-service short cautioning audiences against spreading rumors during wartime. Both the film and Bernds received a commendation from Stanton Griffis of the government's diplomatic corps, which impressed both Harry Cohn and staff producer Hugh McCollum.

In 1945, Edward Bernds became a screenwriter and director for McCollum's comedy short subjects. Bernds's first effort with The Three Stooges was the lackluster A Bird in the Head (1946), featuring an ailing Curly Howard. The 41-year-old Howard had suffered a series of minor strokes prior to filming; as a result, his tired performances were marred by slurred speech and slower timing. Though Bernds was initially thrilled at being a director, he was horrified when he realized that Curly was in such bad shape (something Columbia short-subject head Jules White failed to tell Bernds). Years later, Bernds discussed his trying experience during the filming of A Bird in the Head:

It was an awful tough deal for a novice rookie director to have a Curly who wasn't himself. I had seen Curly at his greatest and his work in this film was far from great. The wallpaper scene was agony to direct because of the physical movements required to roll up the wallpaper and to react when it curled up on him. It just didn't work. As a fledgling director, my plans were based on doing everything in one nice, neat shot. But when I saw the scenes were not playing, I had to improvise and use other angles to make it play. It was the wallpaper scene that we shot first, and during the first two hours of filming, I became aware that we had a problem with Curly.

Realizing that Curly was no longer able to perform in the same capacity as before, Bernds devised ways to cover his illness. Curly could still be the star, but the action was shifted away from the ailing Stooge. In A Bird in the Head, the action focuses more on crazy Professor Panzer and Igor. This allowed Curly to maintain a healthy amount of screen time without being required to contribute a great deal.

Bernds often commented that he and Columbia short-subjects chief Jules White never really got along. As a result, Bernds feared that his directing days would be over as soon as they began if Columbia released A Bird in the Head with a weak Curly as his first entry. Producer Hugh McCollum reshuffled the release order, and the superior Micro-Phonies (1945) was released first, securing Bernds's directing position. Bernds struggled through three additional films, all released in 1946, (The Three Troubledoers, Monkey Businessmen and Three Little Pirates, with Curly in varying stages of decline) until the comedian suffered a debilitating stroke that ended his career. When Shemp Howard replaced his brother Curly as the third Stooge, it breathed new life into the Stooges' films, and allowed Bernds to add new flair and wit to the team's antics.

Columbia's short-subject department operated two units, one headed by Jules White, the other by Hugh McCollum. Edward Bernds worked for the McCollum unit, usually collaborating on scripts with Elwood Ullman. Every Columbia series alternated between the White and McCollum units, allowing Bernds to direct the other Columbia comedians: Shemp Howard, Hugh Herbert, Andy Clyde, Gus Schilling and Richard Lane, Joe Besser, Joe DeRita (then a solo comic; he later joined the Three Stooges), Vera Vague, Wally Vernon and Eddie Quillan, Harry Von Zell, and Billie Burke, among others. In 1948 Bernds began directing feature films, his first efforts being the Blondie comedies with Penny Singleton and Arthur Lake.

When the Columbia shorts department downsized in 1952, Hugh McCollum was fired and Bernds voluntarily resigned, out of loyalty to McCollum.

== Later years ==
In 1951, Bernds directed Gold Raiders, an independently produced comedy-western co-starring veteran cowboy star George O'Brien and The Three Stooges. This led to an assignment at the Allied Artists studio, directing action features starring Stanley Clements, which in turn led Bernds into Allied Artists' breadwinning series starring The Bowery Boys. Bernds directed Leo Gorcey, Huntz Hall, and company as though he was still working with the Stooges; the Bernds efforts in the series have the most slapstick content.

Bernds has the distinction of receiving an Oscar nomination by mistake. In 1956 the Academy nominated him and co-writer Elwood Ullman for the screen story to High Society. The Academy actually intended the nomination to be for the big-budget Frank Sinatra-Bing Crosby musical. Bernds and Ullman did make a film in 1955 called High Society — but theirs was a low-budget feature with The Bowery Boys. Graciously and voluntarily, Bernds and Ullman withdrew their nomination, though it still stands in the record books.

Bernds graduated to dramatic features in the late 1950s, although he was reunited with the Three Stooges in the 1960s for their feature films, and the live-action portions of their TV cartoons in The New 3 Stooges; due to their advancing age (Moe and Larry were in their sixties by this point) and the constraints of children's television, he was forced to tone down much of the slapstick. He and Ullman also collaborated on an Elvis Presley feature for Allied Artists, Tickle Me. His best-known work from this time period is arguably the 1959 horror film Return of the Fly. Bernds is also known for directing the cult classic science fiction films World Without End, Queen of Outer Space and Valley of the Dragons. Although Bernds had become a proficient all-around director, he confessed to enjoying his short-subject comedies more. Bernds retired in 1965.

Bernds's autobiography is Mr. Bernds Goes to Hollywood, published in 1999. It details the earlier stages of his career before he was a director. Bernds's directorial career is chronicled in The Columbia Comedy Shorts, first published in 1986; Bernds wrote the foreword and is quoted throughout.

Outliving most of his peers, Edward Bernds died peacefully on May 20, 2000, in Van Nuys, California.

== Selected filmography ==
- Blondie's Secret (1948) (his first feature film as director)
- Gasoline Alley (1951) (director and co-writer)
- Corky of Gasoline Alley (1951) (director and co-writer)
- Private Eyes (1953) (director and co-writer)
- Bowery to Bagdad (1955) (director and co-writer)
- Reform School Girl (1957) (director and writer)
- Joy Ride (1958) (director)
- Return of the Fly (1959) (director and writer)
