= Micro-Phonies =

1945 film by Edward Bernds

- Lobby card for Micro-Phonies. Columbia Pictures incorrectly listed Harry Edwards as director instead of Ed Bernds.
- Directed by: Edward Bernds
- Written by: Edward Bernds
- Produced by: Hugh McCollum
- Starring: Moe Howard; Larry Fine; Curly Howard; Christine McIntyre; Symona Boniface; Gino Corrado; Fred Kelsey; Lynton Brent; Ted Lorch; Heinie Conklin; Chester Conklin; Judy Malcolm
- Cinematography: Glen Gano
- Edited by: Henry Batista
- Distributed by: Columbia Pictures
- Release date: November 15, 1945 (U.S.)
- Running time: 16:53
- Country: United States
- Language: English

Micro-Phonies is a 1945 short subject directed by Edward Bernds starring American slapstick comedy team The Three Stooges (Moe Howard, Larry Fine and Curly Howard). It is the 87th entry in the series released by Columbia Pictures starring the comedians, who released 190 shorts for the studio between 1934 and 1959.

== Plot ==
In their roles as handymen at radio station KGBY, the Stooges engage in a series of mishaps while attempting to connect a pipe to a radiator. Their antics lead to a confrontation with their boss, resulting in further chaos as they inadvertently damage property and irritate an Italian baritone singer and pianist in a neighboring session. Seeking refuge, they stumble into the recording room of aspiring singer Alice Van Doren, where they serendipitously discover her record, "Voices of Spring."

Impressed by Alice's operatic prowess, the Stooges, with Curly impersonating her voice while disguised as a woman, catch the attention of radio host Mrs. Bixby, who hires them for a radio performance. A dispute ensues among the Stooges just before their performance, leading to Moe impulsively breaking a record over Curly's head, ironically, in an attempt to safeguard it. Larry improvises by hastily selecting the "Lucia Sextet" from a collection of records, misidentifying it as the "Sextet from Lucy." This selection necessitates pantomime by all three Stooges, which proceeds smoothly until the Italian baritone recognizes them and interrupts the performance by unplugging the phonograph. This abrupt halt leaves the trio groaning in disappointment, with Curly feigning the loss of his voice as an excuse.

Nevertheless, Alice's genuine talent is recognized by her father, prompting him to support her musical aspirations. Meanwhile, the Stooges face ridicule from the party guests, symbolized by being pelted with records as they hastily depart the scene.

== Production notes ==
Micro-Phonies was filmed on June 4–7, 1945, several months after Curly Howard suffered a mild stroke. His performances were marred by slurred speech and slower timing. Though Micro-Phonies was the first film released that was directed by novice director Edward Bernds, it was not his first attempt (the first being A Bird in the Head). Understandably, Bernds was excited at his big chance to direct, but was shocked when he saw how ill Curly had become. Years later, Bernds discussed his trying experience during the filming of A Bird in the Head:

"It was an awful tough deal for a novice rookie director to have a Curly who wasn't himself. I had seen Curly at his greatest and his work in this film was far from great. The wallpaper scene was agony to direct because of the physical movements required to roll up the wallpaper and to react when it curled up in him. It just didn't work. As a fledgling director, my plans were based on doing everything in one nice neat shot. But when I saw the scenes were not playing, I had to improvise and use other angles to make it play. It was the wallpaper scene that we shot first, and during the first two hours of filming, I became aware that we had a problem with Curly."

Bernds feared that his directing days would be over as soon as they began if A Bird in the Head (featuring a sluggish Curly) was released as his first effort. Producer Hugh McCollum acted quickly, and reshuffled the release order of the films Bernds had directed (Bernds had already completed Micro-Phonies and The Three Troubledoers in addition to A Bird in the Head). As a result, the superior Micro-Phonies (in which Curly was in much better form) was released first, securing Bernds's directing position. Bernds would forever be indebted to McCollum for this act of kindness; henceforth, McCollum produced all of Bernds's Stooge films.

Bernds later recalled how Curly's condition was inconsistent:

"...it was strange the way he [Curly] went up and down. In the order I shot the pictures, not in the order they were released, he was down for A Bird in the Head and The Three Troubledoers, he was up for Micro-Phonies, way down for Monkey Businessmen and then up again, for the last time, in Three Little Pirates."

Footage was reused in the 1960 compilation feature film Stop! Look! and Laugh!

== Quotes ==
- Moe: "Quiet, numbskulls, I'm broadcasting!"
- Moe: (looking over a few records) "'Sextet by Lucy' ..." (turns to Curly) "Can you sing it?"
- Curly: "I can't even SAY it!"
