= A Bird in the Head =

1946 American short film by Edward Bernds

- Directed by: Edward Bernds
- Written by: Edward Bernds
- Produced by: Hugh McCollum
- Starring: Moe Howard; Larry Fine; Curly Howard; Vernon Dent; Robert Williams; Frank Lackteen; Art Miles
- Cinematography: Burnett Guffey
- Edited by: Henry Batista
- Distributed by: Columbia Pictures
- Release date: February 28, 1946 (U.S.)
- Running time: 17:18
- Country: United States
- Language: English

A Bird in the Head is a 1946 short subject directed by Edward Bernds starring American slapstick comedy team The Three Stooges (Moe Howard, Larry Fine and Curly Howard). It is the 89th entry in the series released by Columbia Pictures starring the comedians, who released 190 shorts for the studio between 1934 and 1959.

== Plot ==
The Stooges, employed as paperhangers, fail to meet their boss Mr. Beedle's standards, resulting in a botched job that incites his wrath. In their haste to escape his anger, they inadvertently stumble into the laboratory of the eccentric Professor Panzer and his assistant Nikko. Panzer, obsessed with transplanting a human brain into his gorilla Igor, identifies Curly as the ideal candidate. The trio finds themselves locked in the laboratory as Panzer schemes to extract Curly's brain.

Amidst the chaos, Igor breaks free but forms an unexpected bond with Curly, leading to a reversal of allegiance. In a bid to evade Panzer's clutches, the Stooges dismantle the laboratory, facilitating their escape with Igor in tow.

== Cast ==
=== Credited ===
- Moe Howard as Moe
- Larry Fine as Larry
- Curly Howard as Curly
- Vernon Dent as Professor Panzer
- Frank Lackteen as Nikko
- Robert Williams as Mr. Beedle

=== Uncredited ===
- Art Miles as Igor the Gorilla

== Production notes ==
The title A Bird in the Head is a pun on the phrase "a bird in the hand is worth two in the bush." A Bird in the Head was filmed over a period of five days (April 9–13, 1945), which was longer than usual. Due to the death of President Franklin D. Roosevelt on April 12, filming ended early out of respect for the deceased Commander-in-chief.

=== Curly's illness ===
Prior to the filming of A Bird in the Head, 41-year-old Curly Howard had endured a series of minor strokes, which adversely affected his performance, leading to slurred speech and slower timing. This film marked the directorial debut of former Columbia sound technician Edward Bernds. Initially elated at the opportunity to direct, Bernds was dismayed to discover the extent of Curly's deteriorated condition, a fact that Columbia's head of short subjects and director, Jules White, had failed to disclose. In later years, Bernds recounted the challenging experience he faced during the production of A Bird in the Head:

"It was an awful tough deal for a novice rookie director to have a Curly who wasn't himself. I had seen Curly at his greatest and his work in this film was far from great. The wallpaper scene was agony to direct because of the physical movements required to roll up the wallpaper and to react when it curled up in him. It just didn't work. As a fledgling director, my plans were based on doing everything in one nice neat shot. But when I saw the scenes were not playing, I had to improvise and use other angles to make it play. It was the wallpaper scene that we shot first, and during the first two hours of filming, I became aware that we had a problem with Curly."

Recognizing Curly's diminished ability to perform at his previous capacity, Edward Bernds implemented strategies to accommodate his condition. Curly retained his starring role, but the focus of the action was redirected to other characters, such as the eccentric Professor Panzer and Igor. In A Bird in the Head, this shift allowed Curly to maintain a significant presence on screen without necessitating extensive participation.

Bernds frequently remarked on his strained relationship with Jules White. Bernds was concerned that his directorial career might be prematurely curtailed if A Bird in the Head, featuring a weakened Curly, was his debut release. To mitigate this risk, producer Hugh McCollum rearranged the release schedule, allowing the more successful Micro-Phonies to premiere first, thereby solidifying Bernds's position as a director.

The television print distributed by Screen Gems in the late 1950s omitted a scene in which Curly and the gorilla consume alcohol in the laboratory and subsequently experience humorous aftereffects.
