= Hugh McCollum =

American film producer (1900–1968)

- Born: March 9, 1900; Ridley Park, Pennsylvania; U.S.
- Died: March 16, 1968 (aged 68); Corona del Mar, Newport Beach, California; U.S.
- Years active: 1929-1960
- Spouse: Josephine Chippo

Hugh McCollum (March 9, 1900 – March 16, 1968) was an American film producer best known for his credits on Three Stooges short subject comedies.

== Career ==
McCollum was born in the Philadelphia suburb of Ridley Park, Pennsylvania. He attended the Episcopal Academy in Philadelphia and later matriculated at the University of Pennsylvania for one year. In 1929, McCollum was hired as a secretary to the Columbia Pictures head Harry Cohn. He gradually worked his way up the corporate ladder, and when the studio's short-subject department became successful enough to support two units, department head Jules White led the first unit, and Hugh McCollum was placed in charge of the second.

== McCollum and Ed Bernds ==
In 1945, McCollum gave Columbia sound engineer Edward Bernds an opportunity to write scripts for the shorts department, and then to direct. His first assignment in the director's chair was the Three Stooges film A Bird in the Head (1946). Bernds was excited at his big chance, but was shocked when he saw that popular Stooge Curly Howard was ill, having suffered several minor strokes prior to filming (something Jules White failed to mention to Bernds). Years later, Bernds discussed his trying experience during the filming of A Bird in the Head:

It was an awful tough deal for a novice rookie director to have a Curly who wasn't himself. I had seen Curly at his greatest and his work in this film was far from great. The wallpaper scene was agony to direct because of the physical movements required to roll up the wallpaper and to react when it curled up in him. It just didn't work. As a fledgling director, my plans were based on doing everything in one nice neat shot. But when I saw the scenes were not playing, I had to improvise and use other angles to make it play. It was the wallpaper scene that we shot first, and during the first two hours of filming, I became aware that we had a problem with Curly.

Bernds feared that his directing days would be over as soon as they began if A Bird in the Head (featuring a sluggish Curly) was released as his first effort. Hugh McCollum acted quickly, and reshuffled the release order of the films Bernds had directed (Bernds had also completed Micro-Phonies and The Three Troubledoers (1946) in addition to A Bird in the Head). As a result, the superior Micro-Phonies (in which Curly was on his mark) was released first, securing Bernds's directing position. Bernds would forever be indebted to McCollum for this act of kindness; henceforth, McCollum produced all of Bernds's Stooge films.

McCollum continued to function as a short-subject producer, in close collaboration with writer-director Edward Bernds and writer Elwood Ullman. Columbia's comedy stars alternated between the McCollum and Jules White units. Unlike White, who personally directed most of his productions, McCollum preferred to concentrate on the business aspects of production, and directed only a few films. McCollum's attention to the studio's business activities paid off when he arranged to use sets and costumes commissioned for important Columbia feature films. This efficient, money-saving arrangement gave McCollum's productions a much glossier look than usual.

When Bernds was unavailable, McCollum directed Hula-La-La (1951), a South Seas satire with the Stooges.

== Dismissal from Columbia Pictures ==
Both McCollum and Bernds often clashed with White, and when Columbia downsized the shorts department in 1952, White convinced the studio executives that two units were no longer necessary, resulting in McCollum's dismissal. Out of loyalty to McCollum, Bernds resigned as well, leaving White to run the entire short subject department alone. This left White as the sole director of the Stooges films from late 1952 to 1957 when the Stooges' contract with the studio expired.

== Later years ==
After Columbia, McCollum became the production manager for Gene Autry's Flying A Productions, then served as production manager for Jack Wrather Productions, a position he continued until his retirement.

Hugh McCollum died on March 16, 1968, in the Corona del Mar section of Newport Beach, California.
