= The Blind Woman of Sorrento =

The Blind Woman of Sorrento (Italian:La cieca di Sorrento) may refer to:

- The Blind Woman of Sorrento (novel), a novel by Francesco Mastriani
- The Blind Woman of Sorrento (1916 film), a silent Italian film directed by Gustavo Serena
- The Blind Woman of Sorrento (1934 film), an Italian film directed by Nunzio Malasomma
- The Blind Woman of Sorrento (1952 film), an Italian film directed by Giacomo Gentilomo
