= Fling in the Ring =

1955 American short film by Jules White

- One-sheet poster
- Directed by: Jules White; Edward Bernds (stock footage)
- Written by: Jack White
- Produced by: Jules White
- Starring: Moe Howard; Larry Fine; Shemp Howard; Frank Sully; Richard Wessel; Claire Carleton; Harold Brauer; Cy Schindell; Heinie Conklin; Sammy Stein; Joe Palma; Stanley Blystone; Dave Harper; Tom Kingston
- Cinematography: Ray Cory
- Edited by: Robert B. Hoover
- Distributed by: Columbia Pictures
- Release date: January 6, 1955 (U.S.)
- Running time: 16:18
- Country: United States
- Language: English

Fling in the Ring is a 1955 short subject directed by Jules White starring American slapstick comedy team The Three Stooges (Moe Howard, Larry Fine and Shemp Howard). It is the 159th entry in the series released by Columbia Pictures starring the comedians, who released 190 shorts for the studio between 1934 and 1959.

== Plot ==
The Stooges work as trainers for boxer Chopper Kane, under the shady oversight of Big Mike, a crooked figure tied to boxing and organized crime. Though they back Chopper, Big Mike secretly bets on his rival, Gorilla Watson, and pressures the Stooges to sabotage Chopper or face serious consequences.

To ensure Chopper loses, the Stooges try to slow him down by making him gain weight. Their plan falls apart when luck intervenes when Gorilla injures his hand trying to punch Moe the night before the fight.

Chopper wins, but Big Mike is furious and sends his goons after the Stooges. After a slapstick showdown where they briefly get the upper hand, the Stooges are chased again. In the chaos, Shemp knocks out both the henchmen and himself. As Moe and Larry try to revive him, they accidentally rouse the goons too, forcing them to flee with Shemp in tow.

== Cast ==
=== Credited ===
- Moe Howard as Moe
- Larry Fine as Larry
- Shemp Howard as Shemp
- Frank Sully as Big Mike
- Dick Wessel as Chopper Kane (Stock Footage)
- Claire Carleton as Kitty Davis (Stock Footage)

=== Uncredited ===
- Tommy Kingston as Coin Tossing Henchman
- Harold Brauer as Henchman (Stock Footage)
- Heinie Conklin as Watson's manager (Stock Footage)
- Sammy Stein as Gorilla Watson (Stock Footage)
- Cy Schindell as Moose (Stock Footage)
- Joe Palma as Body Double for Cy Schindell (New Footage)

== Production notes ==
Fling in the Ring serves as a remake of Fright Night (1947), employing a substantial amount of stock footage sourced from its predecessor. Additional scenes for Fling in the Ring were filmed on April 27, 1954.

Due to the unavailability of Harold Brauer, who portrayed "Big Mike" in the original Fright Night, Joe Palma doubles for him, captured from behind to emulate Brauer's character.

== See also ==
- List of American films of 1955
