= The Blind Woman of Sorrento (1934 film) =

- Directed by: Nunzio Malasomma
- Written by: Francesco Mastriani (novel); Tomaso Smith
- Produced by: Giulio Manenti
- Starring: Dria Paola; Corrado Racca; Dino Di Luca; Anna Magnani
- Cinematography: Arturo Gallea
- Edited by: Giacomo Gentilomo
- Music by: Umberto Mancini
- Production company: Manenti Film
- Release date: 30 April 1934
- Running time: 68 minutes
- Country: Italy
- Language: Italian

The Blind Woman of Sorrento (Italian: La cieca di Sorrento) is a 1934 Italian drama film directed by Nunzio Malasomma and starring Dria Paola, Corrado Racca and Dino Di Luca. It is an adaptation of the 1852 novel of the same title by Francesco Mastriani. The novel has been adapted into film on two other occasions: the 1916 silent The Blind Woman of Sorrento and 1953's The Blind Woman of Sorrento.

== Cast ==
- Dria Paola as Beatrice di Rionero
- Corrado Racca as Prof. Filippo Morisoni
- Dino Di Luca as Ernesto Basileo, il notaio
- Anna Magnani as Anna, la sua amante
- Mario Steni as Oliviero Simon / Carlo Baldieri
- Giulio Tempesti as Il marchese di Rionero
- Diana Lante as La marchesa Albina di Rionero
- Miranda Bonansea as Beatrice, la bambina
- Adolfo Geri as Giovannino
- Vera Dani as Maria Luisa
- Giotto Tempestini as Il precettore
- Fernando De Crucciati as Ferdinando Maria Baldieri
- Carlo Duse as Emisario borbonico
- Giulio Gemmò as Don Giacomo Sordi
- Leo Bartoli as Don Gesualdo
- Vittorio Tettoni
- Fulvia Gerbi
- Ada Cannavò

== Bibliography ==
- Moliterno, Gino. Historical Dictionary of Italian Cinema. Scarecrow Press, 2008.
