= Smoky River Serenade =

1947 film directed by Derwin Abrahams

- Theatrical release poster
- Directed by: Derwin Abrahams
- Screenplay by: Barry Shipman
- Produced by: Colbert Clark
- Starring: Paul Campbell; Ruth Terry; Guinn "Big Boy" Williams; Virginia Hunter; Carolina Cotton; Cottonseed Clark
- Cinematography: George F. Kelley
- Edited by: Paul Borofsky
- Production company: Columbia Pictures
- Distributed by: Columbia Pictures
- Release date: August 21, 1947
- Running time: 67 minutes
- Country: United States
- Language: English

Smoky River Serenade is a 1947 American Western film directed by Derwin Abrahams and written by Barry Shipman. The film stars Paul Campbell, Ruth Terry, Guinn "Big Boy" Williams, Virginia Hunter, Carolina Cotton and Cottonseed Clark. The film was released on August 21, 1947, by Columbia Pictures.

== Cast ==
- Paul Campbell as Jack Norman
- Ruth Terry as Sue Greeley
- Guinn "Big Boy" Williams as Wagon Wheel
- Virginia Hunter as Wilda Moore
- Carolina Cotton as Carolina
- Cottonseed Clark as Cottonseed Clark
- Paul E. Burns as Pop Robinson
- Russell Hicks as J. Bricket Armstrong
- Emmett Vogan as Sam Givins
- Michael Towne as Photographer
- Sandy Sanders as Chuck Mason
- Lulu Mae Bohrman as Mrs. White
- Ken Trietsch as Hoosier Hotshot Ken
- Paul Trietsch as Hoosier Hotshot Hezzie
- Charles Ward as Hoosier Hotshot Gabe
- Gil Taylor as Hoosier Hotshot Gil
- M.H. Richman as Ace
- J.D. Sumner as J. D.
- Eddie Wallace as Eddie
- Freddie Daniel as Freddie
- Texas Rose Bascom as trick roper
