= Matri-Phony =

1942 American short film by Harry Edwards

- Directed by: Harry Edwards
- Written by: Monte Collins; Elwood Ullman
- Produced by: Del Lord; Hugh McCollum
- Starring: Moe Howard; Larry Fine; Curly Howard; Vernon Dent; Monte Collins; Marjorie Deanne; Cy Schindell; Eddy Chandler; Max Wagner
- Cinematography: George Meehan
- Edited by: Paul Borofsky
- Distributed by: Columbia Pictures
- Release date: July 2, 1942 (U.S.)
- Running time: 17:08
- Country: United States
- Language: English

Matri-Phony is a 1942 short subject directed by Harry Edwards starring American slapstick comedy team The Three Stooges (Moe Howard, Larry Fine and Curly Howard). It is the 63rd entry in the series released by Columbia Pictures starring the comedians, who released 190 shorts for the studio between 1934 and 1959.

== Plot ==
During the era of "Ancient Erysipelas", the Stooges preside over Ye Olde Pottery shop, a quaint establishment nestled within the bustling streets.

Amidst the backdrop of this setting, the formidable Emperor Octopus Grabus sets forth on a quest to secure a new consort, his preferences leaning towards red-haired maidens. Grabus then sets his sights on Diana, a fair maiden who seeks refuge within the protective confines of the Stooges' establishment, hoping to evade the unwanted advances of the emperor. However, their sanctuary is abruptly shattered when palace guards uncover the ruse, precipitating their apprehension and subsequent audience with Grabus.

In a turn of events, Grabus, incensed by the deception, metes out a severe punishment, condemning the Stooges to face execution within the formidable arena of the Colosseum, where the menacing jaws of lions await their hapless victims. Faced with imminent peril, the Stooges orchestrate a daring rescue mission to aid Diana's escape, while Moe and Larry devise a stratagem wherein Curly assumes the guise of Grabus' intended bride.

Thoroughly exploiting Grabus' visual impairment, exacerbated by the destruction of his spectacles, the Stooges facilitate their own flight from the palace, albeit encountering an unexpected misadventure that concludes with their inverted suspension upon the spears of the guards.

== Cast ==
=== Credited ===
- Curly Howard as Curleycue (as Curly)
- Larry Fine as Larrycus (as Larry)
- Moe Howard as Mohicus (as Moe)
- Marjorie Deanne as Diana
- Vernon Dent as Emperor Octopus Grabus

=== Uncredited ===
- Cy Schindell as Guard
- Eddy Chandler as Guard
- Max Wagner as Guard
- Bobby Barber as Snake Charmer
- Monte Collins as Prime Minister
- Si Jenks as Wino
- Christine McIntyre as Beauty Contestant (deleted scenes)
- Gene Roth as Middle guard

== Production notes ==
Matri-Phony was the first short filmed in 1942, shot over a period of three weeks between March 5 and March 25, 1942. It is the first Stooge film to employ the accordion-based, driving version of "Three Blind Mice" over the opening credits. This faster theme would be used until the end of 1944. The film title is a pun on the word "matrimony.

Matri-Phony had a difficult gestation. The three-week shooting schedule was unusual for a Columbia short film, as most were completed over four consecutive days. It is not known how many days it took to film, with six being an estimate. There were material script changes, reshoots and deleted footage, with most of the blame aimed at director Harry Edwards who had developed a reputation at Columbia Pictures as the studio's worst director. His poor directing skills are apparent throughout, with bad staging, awkward jump cuts and several unfocused shots. In the closing scene when the Stooges are hanging upside down from the guards' spears, Edwards inexplicably directed the guards to walk straight into a wall. His voice can also be heard loudly directing Larry Fine: "Larry, grab the.....". Larry was the only one who was not holding onto his guard's trousers: after receiving his direction, Larry quickly grabbed the pants. This type of exchange would normally be muted during post-production. After his next directoral effort with the Stooges (Three Little Twirps), the trio requested to never work with him again.

Curly Howard also began to exhibit subtle hints of his slow physical decline. DVD Talk critic Stuart Galbraith IV noted that it is "demonstrated in a scene where he tries to eat a live crab (with snapping claws), a variation of the oyster-in-the-soup gag from the previous year (from Dutiful But Dumb). It's reasonably funny, but Curly's timing is just a tad off and the two scenes make quite a contrast."

== Quotes ==
Curly: "Oh, food!" (beholds the spread before him) "Vitamins A B C D E F GEE, I like food!"
