= Fright Night (1947 film) =

1947 film by Edward Bernds

- Directed by: Edward Bernds
- Written by: Clyde Bruckman
- Produced by: Hugh McCollum
- Starring: Moe Howard; Larry Fine; Shemp Howard; Dick Wessel; Claire Carleton; Harold Brauer; Cy Schindell; Heinie Conklin; Sammy Stein; Stanley Blystone; Dave Harper; Tom Kingston
- Cinematography: Philip Tannura
- Edited by: Paul Borofsky
- Distributed by: Columbia Pictures
- Release date: March 6, 1947 (U.S.)
- Running time: 17:26
- Country: United States
- Language: English

Fright Night is a 1947 short subject directed by Edward Bernds starring American slapstick comedy team The Three Stooges (Moe Howard, Larry Fine and Shemp Howard, in his first starring role after returning to the act). It is the 98th entry in the series released by Columbia Pictures starring the comedians, who released 190 shorts for the studio between 1934 and 1959.

== Plot ==
The Stooges are managers of a beefy boxer named Chopper Kane (Dick Wessel), and they bet their bank roll on his next fight. When a gangster (Tiny Brauer) tells them to have Chopper lose (as he has a lot of money bet on his opponent Gorilla Watson) or they will lose their lives, the boys decide to play along. They try to soften Chopper up by feeding him rich food and having him spend time with their friend Kitty (Claire Carleton). The fight gets canceled when Kitty dumps Chopper for Gorilla, angering Chopper to get even with Gorilla and, in a fluke accident, Gorilla gets entangled with Moe and breaks his hand against a wall. The Stooges think they have put one over on the gangsters, only to have the bad guys corner them in a deserted warehouse. Instead of being rubbed out, the boys capture the crooks and get a reward.

== Cast ==
=== Credited ===
- Moe Howard as Moe
- Larry Fine as Larry
- Shemp Howard as Shemp
- Dick Wessel as Chopper Kane
- Claire Carleton as Kitty Davis

=== Uncredited ===
- Harold Brauer as Big Mike
- Cy Schindell as Moose
- Heinie Conklin as Watson's manager
- Sammy Stein as Gorilla Watson
- Stanley Blystone as Cop
- Dave Harper as Cop
- Tom Kingston as Chuck

== Production notes ==
Fright Night marked the return of Shemp Howard to the Stooges, who had last performed with the act 17 years prior. Shemp agreed to rejoin the act until brother Curly Howard recovered enough to return to the Stooges (Curly never did). It was filmed June 5–8, 1946: production commenced less than one month after Curly suffered a debilitating stroke on May 6. The film was remade in 1955 as Fling in the Ring, using ample stock footage.

A lifelong boxing fan, Fright Night was Shemp's favorite Stooge film.
