= Mastriani =

Mastriani is a surname. Notable people with the surname include:

== People ==
- Francesco Mastriani (1819–1891), Italian novelist
- Gonzalo Mastriani (born 1993), Uruguayan footballer

== Characters ==
- Jess Mastriani, character in the Canadian television series Missing

== See also ==
- Doug Mastriano, American politician with a similar surname
