= Mutts to You =

1938 American short film by Charley Chase

- Directed by: Charley Chase
- Written by: Al Giebler; Elwood Ullman
- Produced by: Charley Chase; Hugh McCollum
- Starring: Moe Howard; Larry Fine; Curly Howard; Bess Flowers; Bud Jamison; Vernon Dent; Lane Chandler; Cy Schindell
- Cinematography: Allen G. Siegler
- Edited by: Art Seid
- Distributed by: Columbia Pictures
- Release date: October 14, 1938 (U.S.)
- Running time: 18:02
- Country: United States
- Language: English

Mutts to You is a 1938 short subject directed by Charley Chase starring American slapstick comedy team The Three Stooges (Moe Howard, Larry Fine and Curly Howard). It is the 34th entry in the series released by Columbia Pictures starring the comedians, who released 190 shorts for the studio between 1934 and 1959.

== Plot ==
The Stooges, proprietors of a dog grooming enterprise, chance upon an infant left momentarily unattended on the doorstep of an affluent couple, the Mannings. Misinterpreting the situation as abandonment, the trio, bound by a sense of moral obligation, collect the child with the intention of delivering him to the police station. They first bring the child to their apartment complex for a feeding, notwithstanding the prohibition against infants on the premises.

Upon learning of the infant's reported kidnapping through the afternoon newspaper, the Stooges endeavor to facilitate the child's return to his parents. Employing a ruse involving Curly disguised as the child's mother, they navigate a series of misadventures, culminating in an encounter with an Irish policeman, O'Halloran, who erroneously perceives them as the perpetrators of the abduction.

A frantic pursuit ensues, with the Stooges evading capture while Moe and Larry transport Curly and the infant in a makeshift laundry cart. Ultimately apprehended, the trio's innocence is vindicated when the Mannings elucidate the misunderstanding, thereby absolving the Stooges of any wrongdoing.

However, their attempts to cleanse the infant in a dog washing machine result in comedic mishaps, with Curly's tampering leading to a slapstick denouement wherein the machine repeatedly slaps the baby's bottom.

== Production notes ==
Filming for Mutts to You took place from March 30 to April 2, 1938. The film title is a pun on the insult "Nuts to you!" The Stooges also played babysitters of sorts in Sock-a-Bye Baby, Three Loan Wolves, and Baby Sitters Jitters.

Officer O'Halloran's encounter with Moe and Larry, disguised as Chinese laundrymen, prompts a linguistic exchange laden with comedic elements and cultural references. Noticing their unconventional attire, O'Halloran initiates questioning, to which Moe responds with mock Chinese dialect, while Larry interjects with a blend of Yiddish and English, quipping, "Ikh bin ah China boychik fun Slobodka un Ikh bet dir 'hak mir nit ah chaynik' and I don't mean efsher," translating to "I am a Chinese kid from Slobodka, Lithuania, and I beg you don't bother me, and I don't mean maybe." Moe further embellishes the ruse by asserting, "He from China, East Side," alluding to the Lower East Side of Manhattan, renowned for its significant Jewish population at the time. This exchange reflects the film's utilization of linguistic and cultural juxtapositions to evoke humor and situational irony.
