= Three Pests in a Mess =

1945 film by Del Lord

- Directed by: Del Lord
- Written by: Del Lord
- Produced by: Hugh McCollum
- Starring: Moe Howard; Larry Fine; Curly Howard; Christine McIntyre; Brian O'Hara; Vernon Dent
- Cinematography: Benjamin H. Kline
- Edited by: Henry Batista
- Distributed by: Columbia Pictures
- Release date: January 19, 1945 (U.S.)
- Running time: 15:19
- Country: United States
- Language: English

Three Pests in a Mess is a 1945 short subject written and directed by Del Lord starring American slapstick comedy team The Three Stooges (Moe Howard, Larry Fine and Curly Howard). It is the 83rd entry in the series released by Columbia Pictures starring the comedians, who released 190 shorts for the studio between 1934 and 1959.

== Plot ==
The Stooges endeavor to secure a patent for their fly-catching invention. Unbeknownst to them, their conversation regarding the need to capture 100,000 flies to obtain the patent is overheard by a group of nefarious individuals residing across the hallway.

Mistakenly believing that Curly possesses $100,000, one of the crooks, employing flirtatious tactics, attempts to coerce him into relinquishing the purported funds. However, upon discovering that the sum refers to flies rather than currency, she turns against them and mobilizes the crooks to pursue the Stooges.

Seeking refuge, the trio takes cover in a sporting goods store, where a series of mishaps ensue, reaching its zenith when Curly unintentionally shoots a mannequin, laboring under the erroneous belief that he has taken a human life. Fueled by their misconception, the Stooges embark on a burial expedition for the mannequin, unaware of its true nature, in a nearby pet cemetery.

Their efforts to conceal their imagined crime are thwarted when the cemetery's night watchman observes their activities and alerts the owner, Philip Black. Attending a masquerade party with his associates, Black arrives at the cemetery in a spooky guise, encountering the Stooges in the midst of their burial attempt. Amidst the chaos that ensues, involving the Stooges attempting to dispose of the mannequin, the cemetery's inhabitants unexpectedly emerge from their resting places, prompting the Stooges to flee in terror.

== Cast ==
- Curly Howard as Curly
- Larry Fine as Larry
- Moe Howard as Moe
- Brian O'Hara as I. Cheatham
- Christine McIntyre as con woman
- Vernon Dent as Philip Black

== Production notes ==
Three Pests in a Mess was filmed on June 22–26, 1944. It is a partial remake of the 1933 Paramount Pictures short film Sailors Beware! (also directed by Del Lord) and 1941 Columbia short film Ready, Willing But Unable. The concept of men trolling through a cemetery with a dead body dates back to Laurel and Hardy's 1928 silent film Habeas Corpus.

The syncopated, jazz-tinged version of "Three Blind Mice", first heard in Gents Without Cents, makes its return with this film. This version would be used for the next two releases, as well as Three Loan Wolves, before being retired permanently. This version is played in the key of F major, while the key of G major was previously utilized.

This is the ninth of sixteen Stooge shorts with the word "three" in the title.

Curly's "Call for Philip Black" mimics the popular 'Call for Philip Morris' cigarette advertisements of the period.

A prop man dug a hole and covered it with rubber to achieve the effect of Larry sliding under the door at the cemetery. They quickly pulled him under, and filmed the shot as a speed shot.

Several publications erroneously list the running time of this film as 17:41.

== In popular culture ==
Three Pests in a Mess was one of four Stooge films included in the TBS 1992 Halloween special Three Stooges Fright Night. It was replaced by Spooks! and The Hot Scots in its 1995 airing.
