= Dino Di Luca =

Italian actor (1903–1991)

Dino Di Luca (5 May 1903 – 11 May 1991), also billed as Dino Diluca, was a leading Italian actor of both stage, screen and television. He was active in both Italy and the United States of America from the 1930s through the 1960s.

== Biography ==
Dino Di Luca was born in Livorno, Italy and received critical acclaim for his performances opposite the American actress Shirley Booth in the dramatic Broadway production of The Time of the Cuckoo at the Empire Theatre, with the Italian-American accordionist John Serry Sr. in New York City (1952 -1953). He also achieved credit for his performances in the musical House of Flowers, which was based on the book by Truman Capote and was produced at the Alvin Theatre (1954 – 1955).

As a writer, Di Luca is also credited with his early work on the film Il Su Destino (1938).

In later years during the 1950s, Di Luca appeared frequently on various American television productions including: Studio One (1955, 1957), The Kraft Television Theatre (1954), and The United States Steel Hour (1953).

== Selected filmography ==
- Creatures of the Night (1934)
- The Last of the Bergeracs (1934)
- The Blind Woman of Sorrento (1934)
- Kean (1940)
- The Betrothed (1941)
- A Little Wife (1943)
- The Ten Commandments (1945)
- Hey, Let's Twist! (1961)
- The Cardinal (1963)
