= Honor of the Mounted (1932 film) =

1932 film

- Directed by: Harry L. Fraser
- Written by: Harry L. Fraser
- Produced by: Trem Carr
- Starring: Tom Tyler; Stanley Blystone; Francis McDonald
- Cinematography: Archie Stout
- Edited by: Carl Pierson
- Production company: Trem Carr Pictures
- Distributed by: Monogram Pictures
- Release date: June 20, 1932
- Running time: 57 minutes
- Country: United States
- Language: English

Honor of the Mounted is a 1932 American pre-Code Western film directed by Harry L. Fraser and starring Tom Tyler, Stanley Blystone and Francis McDonald.

It was given a second release by Astor Pictures in 1937.

== Plot ==
A prisoner escapes from the Royal Canadian Mounted Police's Halliday when the constable is knocked out early in the film. Most of the story deals with the resulting chase.

== Cast ==
- Tom Tyler as Constable Tom Halliday
- Stanley Blystone as Scott Blakely, aka Carey
- Francis McDonald as Jean Le Train
- Gordon De Main as Corporal McCarty
- Arthur Millett as Inspector Todd
- William Dyer as U.S. Marshal Hatton
- Celia Ryland as Irene Hatton
- Theodore Lorch as Henchman
- Charles King as Trapper Charlie

== Production ==
The film was completed in just 6 days, finishing in May 1932.

== Bibliography ==
- Martin, Len D. The Allied Artists Checklist: The Feature Films and Short Subjects of Allied Artists Pictures Corporation, 1947-1978. McFarland & Company, 1993.
