= Knights of the Queen =

1954 film by Mauro Bolognini

Knights of the Queen (Italian: I cavalieri della regina) is a 1954 Italian-American swashbuckler, based on The Three Musketeers, and starred Sebastian Cabot. It was shot in Europe.

It later led to a TV series, The Queen's Musketeers or The Three Musketeers, that debuted in the US in 1956.

The film and some episodes of the TV series were directed by Nathan Juran and Mauro Bolognini. Other episodes were directed by Hugo Fregonese, Frank McDonald and Joseph Lerner.

== Cast ==
- Jeffrey Stone as D'Artagnan
- Paul Campbell as Aramis
- Sebastian Cabot as Porthos
- Domenico Modugno as Athos

== Feature films ==
Some of the episodes from the series were edited into four further features, The King's Musketeers (Italian: Le avventure dei tre moschettieri) (1957), La spada imbattibile (1957), Le imprese di una spada leggendaria (1958) and Mantelli e spade insanguinate (1959) respectively.
