= Gero Zambuto =

Italian actor, screenwriter and film director

- Born: Gerardo Calogero Lucrezio Zambuto; 14 April 1887; Grotte, Sicily, Italy
- Died: 11 January 1944 (aged 56); Bassano del Grappa, Veneto, Italy
- Other name: Calogero Zambuto
- Occupations: Actor, writer, director
- Years active: 1913–1944 (film)

Gero Zambuto (1887 – 1944) was an Italian actor, screenwriter and film director.

== Selected filmography ==
La moglie di Claudio

- Fedora (1913)
- When Knights Were Bold (1916)
- La Moglie di Claudio (1918)
- Hedda Gabler (1920)
- Emperor Maciste (1924)
- Hands Off Me! (1937)
- The Fornaretto of Venice (1939)
- Music on the Run (1943)
- Macario Against Zagomar (1944)

== Bibliography ==
- Goble, Alan. The Complete Index to Literary Sources in Film. Walter de Gruyter, 1999. ISBN 978-3-11-181614-2.
