= Miranda Bonansea =

Italian actress and voice actress (1926–2019)

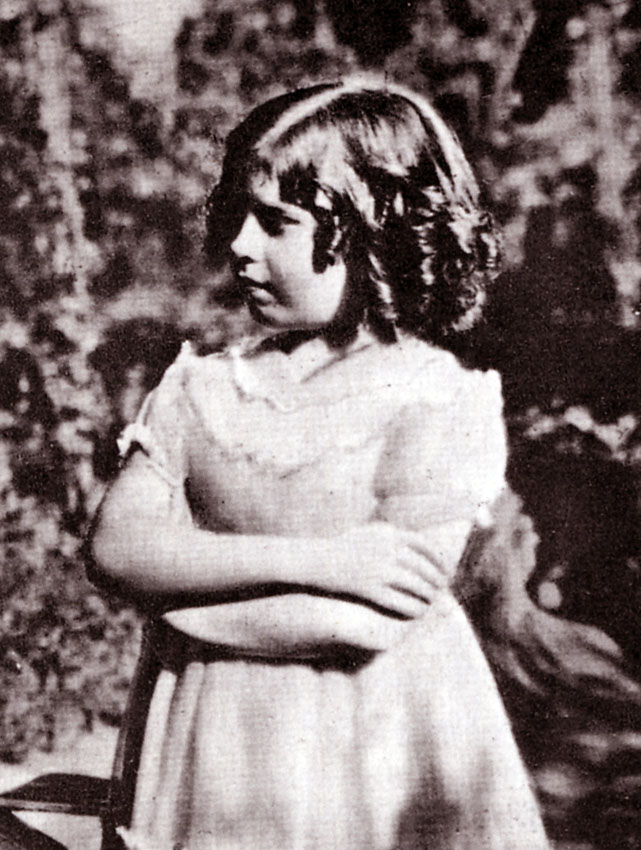
- Bonansea in 1935
- Born: Miranda Bonansea Garavaglia; 31 October 1926; Mondovì, Italy
- Died: 10 February 2019 (aged 92); Rome, Italy
- Other name: Miranda Garavaglia
- Occupations: Actress; voice actress
- Years active: 1932–2009
- Spouse: Claudio Villa (m. 1952; div. 1962)
- Children: 1

Miranda Bonansea (born Miranda Bonansea Garavaglia; 31 October 1926 – 10 February 2019) was an Italian actress and voice actress.

== Life and career ==
Born in Mondovì, the daughter of a photographer for the House of Savoy, at a young age, Bonansea moved to Rome with her family where she would become a child actress as well as a voice dubber. In 1934, she made her debut appearance in the film The Blind Woman of Sorrento. She was also the official Italian voice of Shirley Temple. In the 1937 film Hands Off Me! starring Totò, Bonansea made her character very similar to Temple's likeness.

Other than Shirley Temple, Bonansea has dubbed other actresses such as Judy Garland, Anne Francis, Linda Hunt, June Allyson, Jean Simmons, Jane Powell, Betty White and Marilyn Monroe. She also done some acting work on stage and the radio but she focused entirely on dubbing as an adult. In 2009, Bonansea retired from voice acting effectively ending her 77 year long career.

=== Personal life ===
Bonansea was married to singer Claudio Villa from 1952 to 1962. Together, they had one son, Mauro.

== Death ==
Bonansea died on 10 February 2019 at the age of 92. She suffered an illness for quite some time.

== Filmography ==
=== Cinema ===
- The Blind Woman of Sorrento (1934)
- Red Passport (1935)
- The Joker King (1935)
- The Great Silence (1936)
- The Three Wishes (1937)
- Hands Off Me! (1937)
- Il torrente (1938)
- The Dream of Butterfly (1939)
- I sette peccati (1942)

== Dubbing roles ==
=== Animation ===
- Little Sister in Robin Hood
- Faline in Bambi
- Nanny in 101 Dalmatians II: Patch's London Adventure
- Slurm Queen in Futurama

=== Live action ===
- Elizabeth Blair in Curly Top
- Sara Crewe in The Little Princess
- Shirley Blake in Bright Eyes
- Heidi in Heidi
- Lloyd Sherman in The Little Colonel
- Virgie Cary in The Littlest Rebel
- Dimples Appleby in Dimples
- Molly Middleton in Our Little Girl
- Barbary Barry in Poor Little Rich Girl
- Barbara "Ching-Ching" Stewart in Stowaway
- Penelope "Penny" Day in Now and Forever
- Helen "Star" Mason in Captain January
- Shirley in Change of Heart
- Betsy Brown in Little Miss Broadway
- Mytyl in The Blue Bird
- Barbara Marshall in I'll Be Seeing You
- Barbara Olmstead in Honeymoon
- Bridget Hilton in Since You Went Away
- Dinah Sheldon in Adventure in Baltimore
- Philadelphia Thursday in Fort Apache
- Mary Hagen in That Hagen Girl
- Ellen Baker in Mr. Belvedere Goes to College
- Susan Turner in The Bachelor and the Bobby-Soxer
- Dorothy Gale in The Wizard of Oz
- Jane Falbury in Summer Stock
- Hannah Brown in Easter Parade
- Roberta Stevens in Love Nest
- Amy Fowler Kane in High Noon
- Jacqueline "Jake" Osborne in Elopement
- Mama Kowolski in Bruce Almighty
- Sarah Beckett in Philadelphia
- Martha Wilson in Dennis the Menace
- Miss Schlowski in Kindergarten Cop
- Grandma Estelle in Stuart Little
- Judge McGruder in Judge Dredd
- Sister Madeline in Dragonfly
- Ann Douglas in The Bold and the Beautiful
