= California Frontier =

1938 film by Elmer Clifton

- Theatrical release poster
- Directed by: Elmer Clifton
- Screenplay by: Monroe Shaff; Arthur Hoerl
- Produced by: Monroe Shaff
- Starring: Buck Jones; Carmen Bailey; Milburn Stone; José Pérez; Soledad Jiménez; Stanley Blystone
- Cinematography: Edward Linden
- Edited by: Charles R. Hunt
- Production company: Columbia Pictures
- Distributed by: Columbia Pictures
- Release date: December 15, 1938
- Running time: 55 minutes
- Country: United States
- Language: English

California Frontier is a 1938 American Western film directed by Elmer Clifton and written by Monroe Shaff and Arthur Hoerl. The film stars Buck Jones, Carmen Bailey, Milburn Stone, José Pérez, Soledad Jiménez and Stanley Blystone. The film was released on December 15, 1938, by Columbia Pictures.

== Plot ==
Halstead makes a Land Agent switch the records, which allows him to kick Mexicans out of their own lands, Buck gets sent to investigate and partners up with Juan, Halstead kills the Agent to hide the records and blames Buck and Juan which are now wanted.

== Cast ==
- Buck Jones as Buck Pearson
- Carmen Bailey as Delores Cantova
- Milburn Stone as Mal Halstead
- José Pérez as Juan Cantova
- Soledad Jiménez as Mama Cantova
- Stanley Blystone as Graham
- Carlos Villarías as Don Pedro Cantova
- Paul Ellis as Miguel Cantova
- Ernie Adams as Barclay
- Forrest Taylor as General Wyatt
- Billy Bletcher as Bellhop
- Glenn Strange as Blackie
