= Rip, Sew and Stitch =

1953 American short film by Jules White

- Directed by: Jules White
- Screenplay by: Jack White
- Story by: Felix Adler
- Produced by: Jules White
- Starring: Moe Howard; Larry Fine; Shemp Howard; Vernon Dent; Cy Schindell; Harold Brauer
- Cinematography: Ray Cory
- Edited by: Edwin Bryant
- Distributed by: Columbia Pictures
- Release date: September 3, 1953 (U.S.)
- Running time: 16:39
- Country: United States
- Language: English

Rip, Sew and Stitch is a 1953 short subject directed by Jules White starring American slapstick comedy team The Three Stooges (Moe Howard, Larry Fine and Shemp Howard). It is the 150th entry in the series released by Columbia Pictures starring the comedians, who released 190 shorts for the studio between 1934 and 1959.

== Plot ==
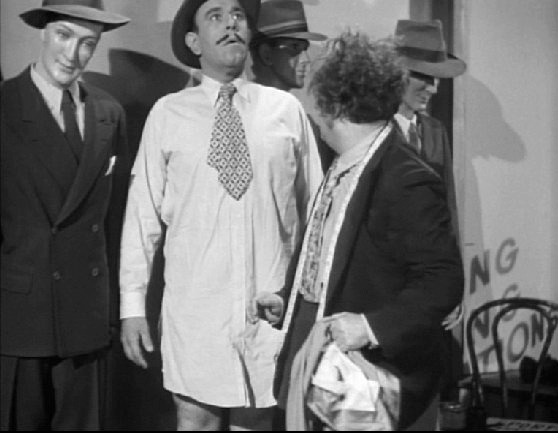
Larry notices that there is something a little too human about one of the "dummies" (Harold Brauer) in Rip, Sew and Stitch

The Stooges find themselves in dire financial straits as their tailor shop faces imminent repossession by the Skin and Flint Finance Corporation. Learning of a substantial reward offered for the capture of fugitive bank robber Terry "Slippery Fingered" Hargan, the trio sees an opportunity to alleviate their economic troubles. Serendipitously, Hargan seeks refuge in their shop, inadvertently leaving behind a suit jacket containing the combination to a safe.

Upon Hargan's discreet return to the shop while the Stooges are occupied elsewhere in pursuit of leads, he attempts to retrieve the combination by surreptitiously rummaging through the jackets. Subsequently, Hargan returns accompanied by his accomplices, leading to a chaotic altercation. Ultimately, the Stooges emerge victorious, securing both the reward to settle their debts and fortuitously acquiring Hargan's ill-gotten gains.

== Cast ==
=== Credited ===
- Moe Howard as Moe
- Larry Fine as Larry
- Shemp Howard as Shemp

=== Uncredited ===
- Vernon Dent as Detective Sharp
- Harold Brauer as Terry Hargen
- Cy Schindell as Henchman
- Bing Connolly as Henchman
- Phil Arnold as Customer with shredded jacket
- Jules White as voice of Radio announcer

== Production notes ==
Rip, Sew and Stitch is a remake of 1947's Sing a Song of Six Pants using ample stock footage. New footage was filmed on October 14, 1952. A double is used for Harold Brauer in the new footage and short's director Jules White redubbed his original voice change to sound older.
