= Monkey's uncle =

Expression depicting surprise

The term monkey's uncle, most notably seen in the idiom "(Well,) I'll be a monkey's uncle", is used to express complete surprise, amazement or disbelief. It can also be used to acknowledge the impossibility of a situation, in the same way that "pigs might fly" is used. An example is if one says: "I may agree that if two plus two equals five, then I am a monkey's uncle".

== History ==
The phrase was used as early as 1917, in an El Paso, Texas, newspaper advertisement for a play called The Brass Monkey. It appeared in newspapers several times in the early 1920s, including several other examples in advertisements. It was originally a sarcastic remark made by creationists. The notion "that [people] were descended from apes was considered blasphemous ... by Darwin's contemporaries", and it was for this reason that the sarcastic phrase came into use.

Michael Quinion notes that the phrase "Monkey's uncle" occurs in a parody of Henry Wadsworth Longfellow's 1855 poem The Song of Hiawatha which was reprinted in James Parton's 1881 The Humorous Poetry of the English Language, and observes: "This may be just an accident of invention, but the date fits". I'm a Monkey's Uncle is the title of a 1948 Three Stooges short film. The Monkey's Uncle is a 1965 Walt Disney movie, with the title song written by the Sherman Brothers and performed by Annette Funicello and the Beach Boys. On their 2003 album Reel to Real, The Selecter included a song titled "Monkey's Uncle", criticizing religious dogma that contradicts scientific evidence.
