= Stone Age Romeos =

1955 American short film by Jules White

- Directed by: Jules White
- Screenplay by: Felix Adler
- Story by: Zion Myers
- Produced by: Jules White
- Starring: Moe Howard; Larry Fine; Shemp Howard; Emil Sitka; Dee Green; Virginia Hunter; Nancy Saunders; Joe Palma; Cy Schindell; Heinie Conklin
- Cinematography: Ira Morgan
- Edited by: Paul Borofsky
- Distributed by: Columbia Pictures
- Release date: June 2, 1955 (U.S.)
- Running time: 15:48
- Country: United States
- Language: English

Stone Age Romeos is a 1955 short subject directed by Jules White starring American slapstick comedy team The Three Stooges (Moe Howard, Larry Fine and Shemp Howard). It is the 163rd entry in the series released by Columbia Pictures starring the comedians, who released 190 shorts for the studio between 1934 and 1959.

== Plot ==
The Stooges embark on a quest to validate the existence of contemporary cavemen, driven by the prospect of securing a monetary reward from museum curator B. Bopper. Armed with a 16mm camera, they venture into the wilderness, poised to document any evidence supporting their claim. Upon their return, they present Bopper with a film purportedly showcasing three cavemen inhabiting a prehistoric milieu. The footage depicts the cavemen engaged in mundane activities such as milk mixing, fish hunting, egg gathering, and defending their female counterparts from rival cavemen.

Bopper receives the film with exuberance, anticipating the validation of his beliefs and the fulfillment of his reward pledge. However, his enthusiasm is short-lived when he overhears the Stooges clandestinely confessing to orchestrating the charade by portraying the cavemen themselves. Incensed by their deception, Bopper responds with a visceral display of outrage, administering punitive retribution by firing upon the Stooges' posterior regions. The altercation culminates with Bopper inflicting self-harm by inadvertently discharging his firearm into his own foot.

== Cast ==
=== Credited ===
- Moe Howard as Moe
- Larry Fine as Larry
- Shemp Howard as Shemp
- Emil Sitka as B. Bopper
- Dee Green as Baggie (stock footage)
- Virginia Hunter as Aggie (stock footage)
- Nancy Saunders as Maggie (stock footage)

=== Uncredited ===
- Barbara Bartay as Secretary
- Joe Palma as Caveman (stock footage)
- Cy Schindell as Caveman (stock footage)
- Bill Wallace as Caveman (stock footage)
- Heinie Conklin as Milkman (stock footage)

== Production notes ==
Stone Age Romeos is a remake of 1948's I'm a Monkey's Uncle, using ample stock footage from the original film. New footage was filmed on August 26, 1954.

== See also ==
- List of American films of 1955
