= Sing a Song of Six Pants =

1947 film by Jules White

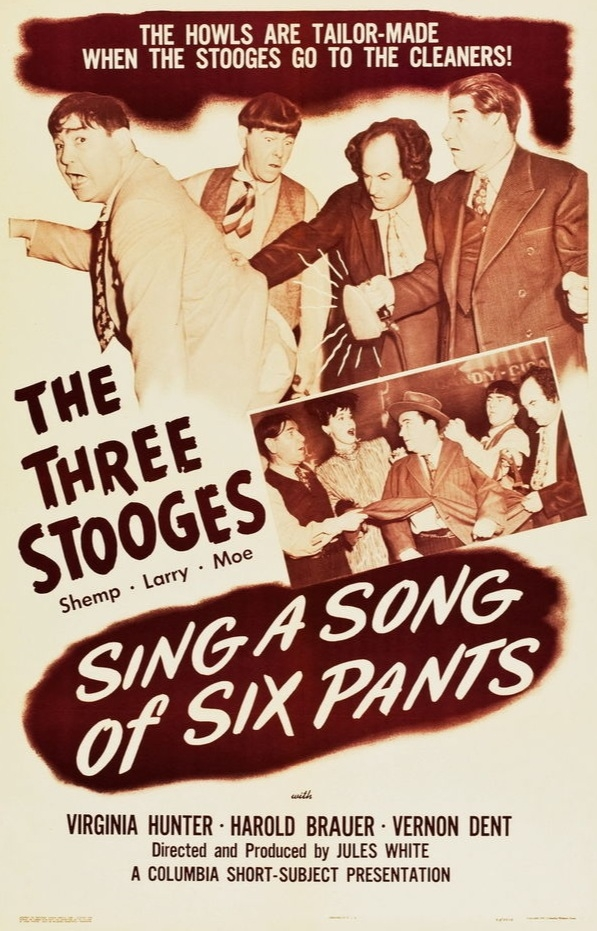
- Directed by: Jules White
- Written by: Felix Adler
- Produced by: Jules White
- Starring: Moe Howard; Larry Fine; Shemp Howard; Vernon Dent; Harold Brauer; Phil Arnold; Virginia Hunter; Cy Schindell
- Cinematography: Henry Freulich
- Edited by: Edwin H. Bryant
- Distributed by: Columbia Pictures
- Release date: October 30, 1947 (U.S.)
- Running time: 17:06
- Country: United States
- Language: English

Sing a Song of Six Pants is a 1947 short subject directed by Jules White starring American slapstick comedy team The Three Stooges (Moe Howard, Larry Fine and Shemp Howard). It is the 102nd entry in the series released by Columbia Pictures starring the comedians, who released 190 shorts for the studio between 1934 and 1959.

== Plot ==
The Stooges operate the Pip Boys tailor shop, imperiled by imminent repossession by the Skin and Flint Finance Corporation. Upon learning of a substantial reward for the capture of notorious bank robber Terry "Slippery Fingered" Hargan, the Stooges perceive an opportunity to alleviate their financial predicament. Serendipitously, Hargan seeks refuge in their establishment, inadvertently leaving behind a suit containing a crucial safe combination. Despite their attempts to extract the combination through Hargan's girlfriend, their efforts prove futile.

Subsequently, Hargan and his accomplices reappear, precipitating a tumultuous altercation. While failing to secure the anticipated reward, the Stooges fortuitously acquire Hargan's ill-gotten gains, enabling them to settle their outstanding debts.

== Cast ==
=== Credited ===
- Moe Howard as Moe
- Larry Fine as Larry
- Shemp Howard as Shemp
- Vernon Dent as Detective
- Harold Brauer as Terry Hargan
- Virginia Hunter as Hargan's Girlfriend

=== Uncredited ===
- Cy Schindell as Henchman
- Bing Connolly as Henchman
- Phil Arnold as Customer with shredded jacket
- Jules White as the voice of the radio announcer

== Production notes ==
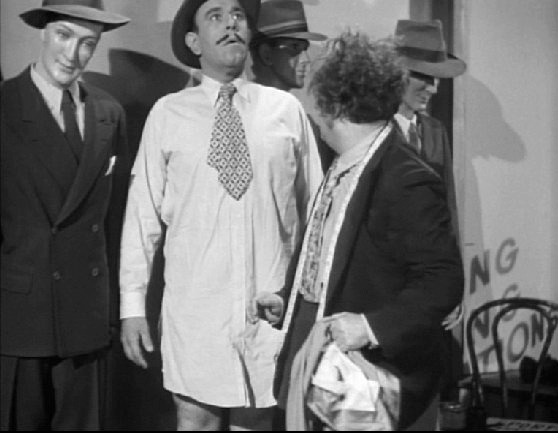
Larry notices that there is something a little too human about one of the "dummies" (Harold Brauer) in Sing a Song of Six Pants.

Sing a Song of Six Pants was filmed on April 1–4, 1947. The title is a takeoff on "Sing a Song of Sixpence," the classic English nursery rhyme. The name of the tailor shop is "Pip Boys," a parody of the auto service chain Pep Boys originally opened in Philadelphia in 1921. Sing a Song of Six Pants was remade in 1953 as Rip, Sew and Stitch, using ample recycled footage from the original.

There is an audio goof in the film during a scene when Moe is making pancakes on the pants press; director Jules White can be heard saying "Cut!" right as the camera fades into the next scene.

== Copyright status ==
Sing a Song of Six Pants

Sing a Song of Six Pants is one of four Columbia Stooge shorts that fell into the public domain after their copyright expired in 1964, the other three being Malice in the Palace (1949), Brideless Groom (1947), and Disorder in the Court (1936). As such, these four shorts frequently appear on budget VHS and DVD compilations. The short was released on Blu-ray by Sony Pictures Home Entertainment as part of The Three Stooges Collection on August 13, 2024.

== See also ==
- Public domain film
- List of American films of 1947
- List of films in the public domain in the United States
