= I'm a Monkey's Uncle =

1948 American short film by Jules White

- Directed by: Jules White
- Written by: Zion Myers
- Produced by: Jules White
- Starring: Moe Howard; Larry Fine; Shemp Howard; Dee Green; Virginia Hunter; Nancy Saunders; Joe Palma; Cy Schindell; Heinie Conklin
- Cinematography: George F. Kelley
- Edited by: Edwin H. Bryant
- Distributed by: Columbia Pictures
- Release date: October 7, 1948 (U.S.)
- Running time: 16:08
- Country: United States
- Language: English

I'm a Monkey's Uncle is a 1948 short subject directed by Jules White starring American slapstick comedy team The Three Stooges (Moe Howard, Larry Fine and Shemp Howard). It is the 110th entry in the series released by Columbia Pictures starring the comedians, who released 190 shorts for the studio between 1934 and 1959.

== Plot ==
In a depiction of prehistoric existence, the Stooges inhabit the Stone Age, tasked with the daily duties inherent to their era, including the milking of cows, fishing, and egg gathering. Against this backdrop, Moe arranges a rendezvous with his paramour, Aggie, prompting Shemp and Larry to seek inclusion, enticed by the prospect of Aggie's sisters, Maggie and Baggie, as potential companions.

Upon allegations by rival cavemen of the Stooges' purported abduction of their female counterparts, a confrontation ensues, characterized by a melee involving the hurling of rocks, mud, and eggs. Emerging triumphant from the skirmish, the Stooges secure the freedom to pursue their romantic interests without further impediment.

== Production notes ==
I'm a Monkey's Uncle was filmed on July 28–31, 1947; it was remade as Stone Age Romeos in 1955. The film title references the idiom "monkey's uncle".

This is one of the few films in which Shemp imitates brother Curly Howard's barking routine. This was done in other films like Who Done It?, due to certain scripts being written for Curly before his untimely illness.
