= Cy Schindell =

American actor (1907-1948)

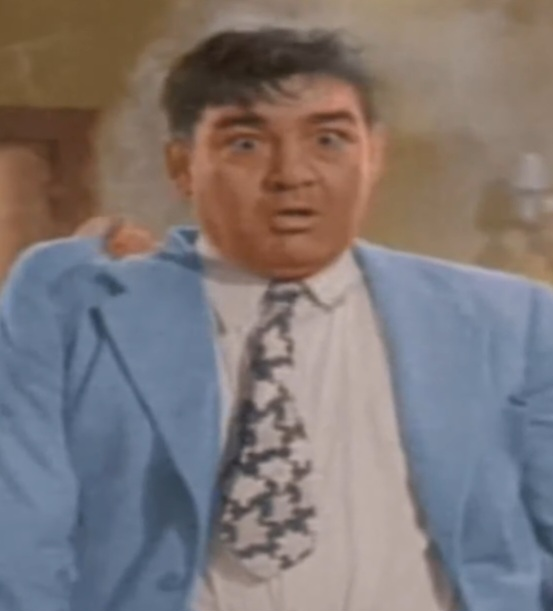
- Schindell in The Three Stooges film Sing a Song of Six Pants (1947)
- Born: Seymour Schindel; March 4, 1907; Brooklyn, New York
- Died: August 24, 1948 (aged 41); Hollywood, California
- Years active: 1933-1948

Seymour "Cy" Schindell (March 4, 1907 – August 24, 1948) was an American actor who appeared in 37 Three Stooges short subjects, mostly as a heavy, though he was never credited in any Stooge shorts.

== Career ==
Born in Brooklyn in 1907 as Seymour Schindel, Schindell was a former middleweight boxer who competed in 19 professional bouts between 1926 and 1928. He later entered the film industry as an extra at Columbia Pictures, where he became a regular supporting player in productions featuring The Three Stooges. Known for his stocky build and tough demeanor, he was frequently cast as antagonists and authority figures. He also performed his own stunt work, including pratfalls.

Schindell appeared in numerous Three Stooges shorts, including Calling All Curs (1939), Nutty But Nice (1940), and Fright Night (1947), typically portraying hostile or domineering characters. In both Matri-Phony (1942) and Fright Night, his character is rendered unconscious and subsequently manipulated by the Stooges from behind a curtain. Footage from Fright Night was later reused in the remake Fling in the Ring (1955). He also appeared as Chizzilini, a parody of Benito Mussolini, in I'll Never Heil Again (1941).

Beyond his work with the Stooges, Schindell had a brief role as the bouncer at Nick's in It's a Wonderful Life (1946) and appeared in a range of supporting parts, often portraying blue-collar workers such as truck drivers, butchers, and policemen.

== Military service and illness ==
Schindell enlisted in the United States Marine Corps in the 1920s and returned to active duty during World War II. While serving on Guadalcanal, he developed a severe case of jungle rot, which later progressed into terminal cancer. He continued working during his illness in order to provide financial security for his family.

Schindell died on August 24, 1948, at the age of 41. He was buried at Los Angeles National Cemetery in Los Angeles, California. His final film appearance was in the Three Stooges short Crime on Their Hands (1948), in which heavy makeup was used to reduce the visible effects of his illness.

== Selected filmography ==
- Fugitive Lady (1934) - Man (uncredited)
- Murder in the Clouds (1934) - Man at Shooting Gallery (uncredited)
- Stranded (1935) - Bridge Worker (uncredited)
- The Farmer Takes a Wife (1935) - Fight Spectator (uncredited)
- Undersea Kingdom (1936, Serial) - Khan's Guardsman (uncredited)
- Fury (1936) - Townsman (uncredited)
- Bullets or Ballots (1936) - Bookie Who Throws Bag (uncredited)
- The Big Noise (1936) - Schmidt's Henchman (uncredited)
- Two-Fisted Gentleman (1936) - Mahoney
- Dizzy Doctors (1937, Short) - Dr. Arm's Assistant (uncredited)
- 3 Dumb Clucks (1937, Short) - Wedding Guest (uncredited)
- I Promise to Pay (1937) - Cy (uncredited)
- Back to the Woods (1937, Short) - Indian (uncredited)
- It Can't Last Forever (1937) - Hansen's Second (uncredited)
- Cash and Carry (1937, Short) - Vault Guard (uncredited)
- The Perfect Specimen (1937) - Injured Boxer (uncredited)
- Boy of the Streets (1937) - Blackie's Henchman (uncredited)
- Wells Fargo (1937) - Minor Role (uncredited)
- The Buccaneer (1938) - Pirate (uncredited)
- Little Miss Roughneck (1938) - Prisoner (uncredited)
- When G-Men Step In (1938) - Phone Man (uncredited)
- Over the Wall (1938) - Shower Room Guard (uncredited)
- Prison Break (1938) - Party Waiter (uncredited)
- I Am the Law (1938) - Strong-Arm Hood at Lindsay's House (uncredited)
- You Can't Take It with You (1938) - Man (uncredited)
- Juvenile Court (1938) - Referee (uncredited)
- Hold That Co-ed (1938) - Policeman (uncredited)
- The Spider's Web (1938, Serial) - Cadman (uncredited)
- Mutts to You (1938, Short) - Policeman (uncredited)
- Hawk of the Wilderness (1938, Serial) - Three Pines (uncredited)
- The Little Adventuress (1938) - Performer (uncredited)
- Smashing the Spy Ring (1938) - Richards (uncredited)
- Three Little Sew and Sews (1939, Short) - Guard (uncredited)
- North of Shanghai (1939) - Mug
- Flying G-Men (1939, Serial) - Osborne (uncredited)
- The Lady and the Mob (1939) - Henchman Collecting Payment (uncredited)
- A Ducking They Did Go (1939, Short) - Fruit Vendor (uncredited)
- The Rookie Cop (1939) - Butch - Joey's Henchman (uncredited)
- Mandrake the Magician (1939, Serial) - Bank Henchman (uncredited)
- Missing Daughters (1939) - Mugg (uncredited)
- Behind Prison Gates (1939) - Convict (uncredited)
- Girl from Rio (1939) - Patron of Blue Bird Gardens (uncredited)
- Calling All Curs (1939, Short) - Tony - Dognapper (uncredited)
- Golden Boy (1939) - Fighter (uncredited)
- Those High Grey Walls (1939) - Convict (uncredited)
- A Woman Is the Judge (1939) - Mickey (uncredited)
- Beware Spooks! (1939) - Barker (uncredited)
- The Shadow (1940, Serial) - Streeter (uncredited)
- Rockin' thru the Rockies (1940, Short) - Indian (uncredited)
- Half a Sinner (1940) - Mugg (uncredited)
- Terry and the Pirates (1940, Serial) - Henchman Morgan (uncredited)
- Grandpa Goes to Town (1940) - Smokey
- Men Without Souls (1940) - Harry (uncredited)
- Nutty But Nice (1940, Short) - Butch - Kidnapper (uncredited)
- Millionaires in Prison (1940) - Red Vernon (uncredited)
- How High Is Up? (1940, Short) - Workman with Blake (uncredited)
- The Secret Seven (1940) - Felton (uncredited)
- From Nurse to Worse (1940, Short) - Policeman (uncredited)
- The Leather Pushers (1940) - Referee (uncredited)
- Angels Over Broadway (1940) - Jack (uncredited)
- So You Won't Talk (1940) - Truck Driver (uncredited)
- The Green Archer (1940, Serial) - Darcy (uncredited)
- The Great Plane Robbery (1940) - Hood (uncredited)
- Mysterious Doctor Satan (1940, Serial) - Jake - Biplane Pilot [Ch. 2] (uncredited)
- Boobs in Arms (1940, Short) - Enemy Soldier (uncredited)
- The Face Behind the Mask (1941) - Benson
- The Devil Commands (1941) - Karl
- The Monster and the Girl (1941) - Henchman (uncredited)
- Knockout (1941) - Hawkins Fight Referee (uncredited)
- Penny Serenade (1941) - Elmer - the Bootlegger (uncredited)
- The Spider Returns (1941, Serial) - Henchman Brown [Ch. 1] (uncredited)
- I'll Never Heil Again (1941, Short) - Chizzilini (uncredited)
- The Iron Claw (1941, Serial) - Henchman Red (uncredited)
- No Greater Sin (1941) - Scaturo's Henchman (uncredited)
- Dick Tracy vs. Crime, Inc. (1941, Serial) - Plant Heavy 8 (uncredited)
- A Yank on the Burma Road (1942) - A Spinaldi Brother (uncredited)
- Jail House Blues (1942) - Prisoner (uncredited)
- Woman of the Year (1942) - Pinkie's Listener in Bar (uncredited)
- Spy Smasher (1942, Serial) - Raygun Thug's Henchman [Ch. 7] (uncredited)
- What's the Matador? (1942, Short) - Bullring Attendant (uncredited)
- Sunday Punch (1942) - Arena Worker (uncredited)
- Matri-Phony (1942, Short) - Guard (uncredited)
- Footlight Serenade (1942) - Bill's Cornerman in Fight Number (uncredited)
- The Talk of the Town (1942) - Townsman at Ballgame (uncredited)
- Wildcat (1942) - Bar Brawler (uncredited)
- Road to Morocco (1942) - Arab Waiter (uncredited)
- Life with Blondie (1945) - Mug (uncredited)
- Tarzan and the Leopard Woman (1946) - Leopard Man (uncredited)
- The Gentleman Misbehaves (1946) - Stagehand (uncredited)
- Uncivil War Birds (1946, Short) - Union Soldier (uncredited)
- Somewhere in the Night (1946) - Thug (uncredited)
- Monkey Businessmen (1946, Short) - Clarence—Nurse (uncredited)
- Gallant Journey (1946) - Celebrant in Field (uncredited)
- The Brute Man (1946) - Crowd Control Policeman (uncredited)
- It's a Wonderful Life (1946) - Nick's Bouncer (uncredited)
- Johnny O'Clock (1947) - Dealer (uncredited)
- Mr. District Attorney (1947) - Truck Driver (uncredited)
- Fright Night (1947, Short) - Moose (uncredited)
- A Likely Story (1947) - Criminal (uncredited)
- Copacabana (1947) - Bouncer (uncredited)
- The Secret Life of Walter Mitty (1947) - Taxicab Driver (uncredited)
- The Foxes of Harrow (1947) - Crew Member (uncredited)
- Nightmare Alley (1947) - Roustabout (uncredited)
- Sing a Song of Six Pants (1947, Short) - Hargan's Henchman (uncredited)
- All Gummed Up (1947, Short) - Man with Prescription (uncredited)
- My Wild Irish Rose (1947) - Man in Olympic Theatre Balcony (uncredited)
- Killer McCoy (1947) - Mariola's Henchman (uncredited)
- Shivering Sherlocks (1948) - Police Officer Jackson (uncredited)
- I'm a Monkey's Uncle (1948, Short) - Caveman Rival (uncredited)
- The Return of October (1948) - Court Bailiff (uncredited)
- Crime on Their Hands (1948, Short) - Muscles (uncredited)
- The Man from Colorado (1949) - Soldier at Dance (uncredited) (final film role)
- Rip, Sew and Stitch (1953, Short) - Hargan's Henchman (uncredited) (archive footage)
- Fling in the Ring (1955, Short) - Moose (uncredited) (archive footage)
- Of Cash and Hash (1955, Short) - Jackson (uncredited) (archive footage)
- Stone Age Romeos (1955, Short) - Caveman (uncredited) (archive footage)
- Hot Ice (1955, Short) - Muscles (uncredited) (archive footage)
