= How High Is Up? =

1940 film by Del Lord

- Directed by: Del Lord
- Written by: Elwood Ullman
- Produced by: Del Lord; Hugh McCollum
- Starring: Moe Howard; Larry Fine; Curly Howard; Vernon Dent; Cy Schindell; Duke York; Bert Young; Bruce Bennett; Edmund Cobb
- Cinematography: Allen G. Siegler
- Edited by: Art Seid
- Distributed by: Columbia Pictures
- Release date: July 26, 1940 (U.S.)
- Running time: 16:26
- Country: United States
- Language: English

How High Is Up? is a 1940 short subject directed by Del Lord starring American slapstick comedy team The Three Stooges (Moe Howard, Larry Fine and Curly Howard). It is the 48th entry in the series released by Columbia Pictures starring the comedians, who released 190 shorts for the studio between 1934 and 1959.

== Plot ==
The Stooges are vagrants who seek to earn money by mending pots and pans. After repairing a flat tire on their truck—a task that requires them first to extricate Curly from his sweater—they drive to a construction site, where they seek to attract business by puncturing holes in the lunch boxes of workers and offering to repair the damage. However, their deceit is soon uncovered, leading to a pursuit onto the site where they blend into a crowd of job seekers. Despite their lack of experience, they offer themselves as expert riveters, and are assigned to work on the precarious 97th floor. Curly's acrophobia presents a significant challenge, which Moe initially addresses by blindfolding him.

During the Stooges' riveting duties, Larry multitasks by heating sausages for his companions, leading to confusion between rivets and food items. Further complications arise when Curly knocks over a can of grease, rendering the beam beneath his feet dangerously slippery. Despite their best efforts, the trio's incompetence leads to a structural collapse after the head foreman, Mr. Blake, leans against a beam. Angered by the mishap, Mr. Blake and his team pursue the Stooges, who escape their antagonists by jumping from the building, deploying a parachute as they descend. They land safely in their wagon below, and drive blindly into traffic with the chute tarp still covering their vehicle.

== Cast ==
=== Credited ===
- Moe Howard as Moe
- Larry Fine as Larry
- Curly Howard as Curly

=== Uncredited ===
- Bruce Bennett as Workman with Lunch Box
- Edmund Cobb as Construction Foreman
- Vernon Dent as Mr. Blake
- Marjorie Kane as Woman on Street
- Frank Mills as Street Workman
- Cy Schindell as Construction Supervisor
- Victor Travers as Man on Street
- Frank Pharr as Workman
- Charlie Phillips as Workman
- Bert Young as Workman
- George Lloyd as Workman
- Chet Brandenburg as Workman
- Ed Brandenburg as Workman
- Sam Lufkin as Workman on Lunch Break

== Production notes ==
Filming for How High Is Up? was completed May 7–11, 1940. The aerial shots of the scene, straight down from the building the Stooges are working on, are from the then newly built Empire State Building in New York City.

The sweater removal scene is considered one of the finest examples of the Stooges' tendencies to use unorthodox methods to get the simplest job done. Since Moe and Larry cannot pull the sweater off of Curly, they figure the only way to do so is through the use of tools, such as mallets, chisels, and eventually a pair of scissors. Larry can be seen breaking character and laughing, particularly when Curly yells, "Don't mind me, don't mind me!!"
