= Fuelin' Around =

1949 film by Edward Bernds

- Directed by: Edward Bernds
- Written by: Elwood Ullman
- Produced by: Hugh McCollum
- Starring: Moe Howard; Larry Fine; Shemp Howard; Emil Sitka; Christine McIntyre; Vernon Dent; Philip Van Zandt; Jacques O'Mahoney; Andre Pola; Harold Brauer
- Cinematography: Vincent J. Farrar
- Edited by: Henry Batista
- Distributed by: Columbia Pictures
- Release date: July 7, 1949 (U.S.)
- Running time: 16:53
- Country: United States
- Language: English

Fuelin' Around is a 1949 short subject directed by Edward Bernds starring American slapstick comedy team The Three Stooges (Moe Howard, Larry Fine and Shemp Howard). It is the 116th entry in the series released by Columbia Pictures starring the comedians, who released 190 shorts for the studio between 1934 and 1959.

== Plot ==
The Stooges are employed as carpet layers at the residence of a research chemist, Professor Sneed and his daughter Hazel, who recently moved in the neighbourhood. Professor Sneed is clandestinely engaged in the development of rocket fuel for government purposes. Concurrently, the Anemian spy, Captain Rork, surveils the professor's activities from an exterior vantage point, harboring intentions of abducting him.

A misidentification ensues when the Anemians mistakenly apprehend the Stooges instead of the intended target, erroneously identifying Larry as the professor. Complications arise when the Stooges are coerced into expeditiously formulating the rocket fuel and transcribing its formula. Subsequently, the true identities of Professor Sneed and his daughter are uncovered by the Anemians, who resort to incarceration in a bid to extract the coveted formula. Leaving Rork demoted from Captain to Private and punished for his incompetence.

An unexpected turn of events ensues with the fortuitous intervention of a diffident prison guard, whose amorous advances towards Sneed's daughter inadvertently facilitate the group's escape. Capitalizing on the opportune moment, the group swiftly absconds from captivity, utilizing the synthesized fuel to propel themselves out of the fortress, effectuating a rapid exodus from Anemia and safely returning to U.S. soil.

== Cast ==
=== Credited ===
- Moe Howard as Moe
- Larry Fine as Larry
- Shemp Howard as Shemp
- Emil Sitka as Professor Snead
- Christine McIntyre as Hazel Snead
- Phil Van Zandt as Cpt./Pvt. Rork
- Vernon Dent as Anemian General
- André Pola as Anemian Colonel
- Jock Mahoney as Cell Guard

=== Uncredited ===
- Harold Brauer as Leon
- Blackie Whiteford as Anemian soldier
- Jimmy Aubrey as Anemian soldier

== Production notes ==
Fuelin' Around was filmed on April 6–9, 1948. It was remade in 1956 as Hot Stuff using available stock footage. The film title is a pun on the expression "fooling around."
