= Tiny Brauer =

American actor (1909–1990)

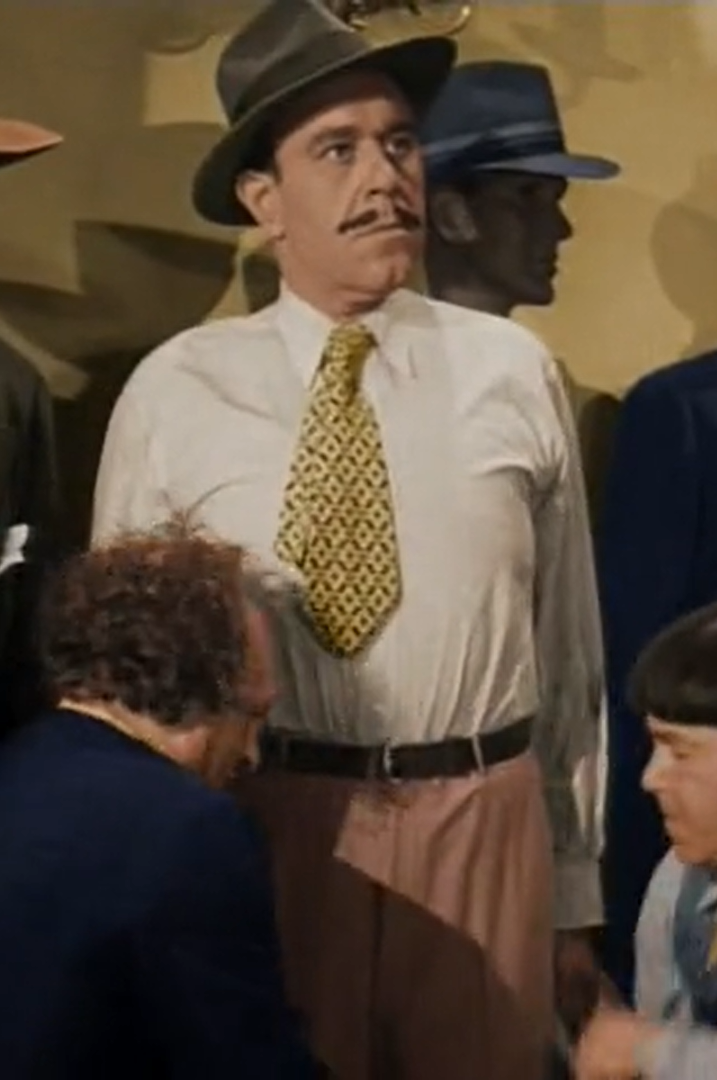
- Brauer in the short film Sing a Song of Six Pants (1947)
- Born: Harold J. Brauer; June 26, 1909; Brooklyn, New York, U.S.
- Died: March 19, 1990 (aged 80); Sepulveda, California, U.S.
- Other names: Harold Brauer; Bill Brauer; Bill Brawer
- Occupation: Actor
- Years active: 1946–1966

Tiny Brauer (born Harold J. Brauer; June 26, 1909 – March 19, 1990) was an American film actor. Born in Brooklyn, New York, Brauer appeared in over 20 films between 1946 and 1966.

== Career ==
Brauer is best known for his role as the "heavy" in several Three Stooges short subjects, particularly in Three Loan Wolves, Fright Night, and Sing a Song of Six Pants.

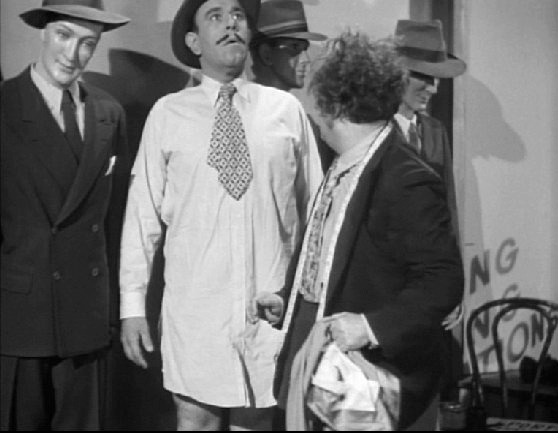
Brauer poses as a mannequin like a statue in Sing a Song of Six Pants. However, current Stooge Larry Fine notices there is something a little too human about the "dummy."

Though he made less than a dozen appearances with the slapstick comedy trio, he was one of only two supporting actors who appears on film with all four configurations of the Stooges (i.e. third Stooge played by Curly Howard, Shemp Howard, Joe Besser, and Curly Joe DeRita). Emil Sitka was the other supporting actor to achieve this goal.

Over the course of his 20-year career, Brauer was billed under several different names. In addition to his work with the Stooges, Brauer also worked with Jimmy Durante and Schilling and Lane.

== Death ==
Brauer was the guest of honor at the April 1989 Three Stooges convention held in Trevose, Pennsylvania. He died of natural causes just shy of a year later on March 19, 1990.

== Selected filmography ==
- Three Loan Wolves (1946)
- Fright Night (1947)
- Sing a Song of Six Pants (1947)
- Fiddlers Three (1948)
- Squareheads of the Round Table (1948)
- Fuelin' Around (1949)
- Rip, Sew and Stitch (1953) (stock footage)
- Fling in the Ring (1955) (stock footage)
- Quiz Whizz (1958)
- The Outlaws Is Coming (1965)
