= Shivering Sherlocks =

1948 film by Del Lord

- Original lobby card
- Directed by: Del Lord
- Written by: Del Lord; Elwood Ullman
- Produced by: Hugh McCollum
- Starring: Moe Howard; Larry Fine; Shemp Howard; Vernon Dent; Christine McIntyre; Kenneth MacDonald; Frank Lackteen; Duke York; Stanley Blystone; Cy Schindell; Joe Palma
- Cinematography: Allen G. Siegler
- Edited by: Henry DeMond
- Distributed by: Columbia Pictures
- Release date: January 8, 1948 (U.S.)
- Running time: 17:29
- Country: United States
- Language: English

Shivering Sherlocks is a 1948 short subject directed by Del Lord starring American slapstick comedy team The Three Stooges (Moe Howard, Larry Fine and Shemp Howard). It is the 104th entry in the series released by Columbia Pictures starring the comedians, who released 190 shorts for the studio between 1934 and 1959.

== Plot ==
The Stooges are erroneously identified as perpetrators in an armored-car robbery. Following a lie detector test administered by Captain Mullins, they are cleared of suspicion and placed under protective custody, under the care of Gladys Harmon, proprietor of the Elite Café, who provides them with an alibi. In return, the Stooges attempt to reciprocate by working at the café, encountering challenges in their endeavors.

Upon learning of her inheritance, Gladys enlists the Stooges to accompany her to inspect her newly acquired mansion. Unbeknownst to them, the mansion serves as a hideout for the actual criminals involved in the armored-car robbery, including Lefty Loomis, Red Watkins, and their accomplice, Angel. Amidst a momentary distraction, Gladys is abducted by the criminals while the Stooges are preoccupied.

As the Stooges initiate a search for Gladys within the mansion, she finds herself bound and gagged in a storeroom. A confrontation ensues when Angel threatens her, but is interrupted by the Stooges' presence. A pursuit ensues, during which Shemp successfully immobilizes the criminals in barrels, leading to their arrest. Gladys, having freed herself, observes the outcome with relief.

== Cast ==
=== Credited ===
- Moe Howard as Moe
- Larry Fine as Larry
- Shemp Howard as Shemp
- Christine McIntyre as Gladys Harmon
- Vernon Dent as Captain Mullins
- Kenneth MacDonald as Lefty Loomis
- Frank Lackteen as Red Watkins
- Duke York as Angel

=== Uncredited ===
- Cy Schindell as Officer Jackson
- Blackie Whiteford as 2nd Policeman
- Stanley Blystone as Elite Café customer
- Joe Palma as Lie detector technician

== Production notes ==
Shivering Sherlocks was filmed on March 25–28, 1947; it was remade in 1955 as Of Cash and Hash, using ample stock footage.

This was the final Stooge film directed by long-time Stooge director Del Lord, as well as the only Stooge short he directed with Shemp Howard as a member of the team.

This entry features a recurring gag of "Man v. Soup," wherein one of the Stooges is about to eat a soup that, at first unbeknownst to them, contains a live bivalve that continually eats the crackers the Stooge drops in it, and a battle between the two parties ensues. In 1941's Dutiful But Dumb, Curly tries to defeat a stubborn oyster; in Shivering Sherlocks, Moe is having problems with clam chowder. Larry would recreate the routine in 1954's Income Tax Sappy.
