= Hakn a tshaynik =

Yiddish idiom

Hakn a tshaynik (literally "to knock a teakettle"; Yiddish: האַקן אַ טשײַניק), meaning to rattle on loudly and insistently, but without any meaning, is a widely used Yiddish idiomatic phrase. It is most often used in the negative imperative sense: Hak mir nisht keyn tshaynik! (literally "Don't knock a teakettle at me!"; Yiddish: !האַק מיר נישט קיין טשײַניק), in the sense of "Stop bothering me!".

== Analysis ==
Aside from the metaphor of the subject of the epithet, making meaningless noise as if he/she were banging on a teakettle, the phrase gains from the imagery of the lid of a teakettle full of boiling water "moving up and down, banging against the kettle like a jaw in full flap, clanging and banging and signifying nothing"; the less the contents, the louder and more annoying the noise.

The phrase became familiar to many Americans without contact with Yiddish speakers by appearing in popular Three Stooges short films. In the 1936 film A Pain in the Pullman, when caught sneaking out of their rooms without paying rent, Moe tries to explain to the landlady by saying, "Well, we were just on our way to hock the trunk so we could pay you," to which Larry kicks in, "Hey, hock a chynick for me too, will ya?", earning himself a swift kick in the shin. In 1938's Mutts to You, Larry, disguised as a Chinese laundryman, pretending to speak Chinese, utters a stream of Yiddish doubletalk, ending with "Hak mir nisht keyn tshaynik, and I don't mean efsher (maybe)!"

The phrase has become relatively common in English in half-translated forms such as "Don’t hock me a chainik", to the point where shortened versions of the phrase, such as "You don't have to hock me about it!" proliferate on television and the movies, particularly where the speaker is intended to represent a resident of New York City, even if not Jewish. On The West Wing, Toby Zeigler says to Sam Seaborn, "what are you hocking me for?", referring to Toby's New York Jewish background.
