= Ivan, Son of the White Devil =

1953 film by Guido Brignone

- Directed by: Guido Brignone
- Screenplay by: Leo Benvenuti; Age & Scarpelli; Gaspare Cataldo; Guido Brignone
- Story by: Glauco Pellegrini; Leo Benvenuti
- Starring: Paul Campbell; Nadia Gray
- Cinematography: Mario Montuori
- Music by: Armando Fragna
- Release date: 1953
- Language: Italian

Ivan, Son of the White Devil (Italian: Ivan, il figlio del diavolo bianco, also known just as Ivan) is a 1953 Italian adventure film written and directed by Guido Brignone and starring Paul Campbell and Nadia Gray. It grossed 345 million lire at the Italian box office.

== Cast ==
- Paul Campbell as Ivan
- Nadia Gray as Princess Alina
- Arnoldo Foà as Emir Abdul
- Nando Bruno as Boris
- Erica Vaal Pahlen as Myriam
- Alda Mangini as Dunia
- Alberto Sorrentino as Stepan
- Sandro Ruffini
- Mario Feliciani
- Nerio Bernardi
- Guido Celano
- Ugo Sasso
- Agostino Salvietti
- Pietro Tordi
