= Paul Campbell (American actor) =

American actor (1923–1999)

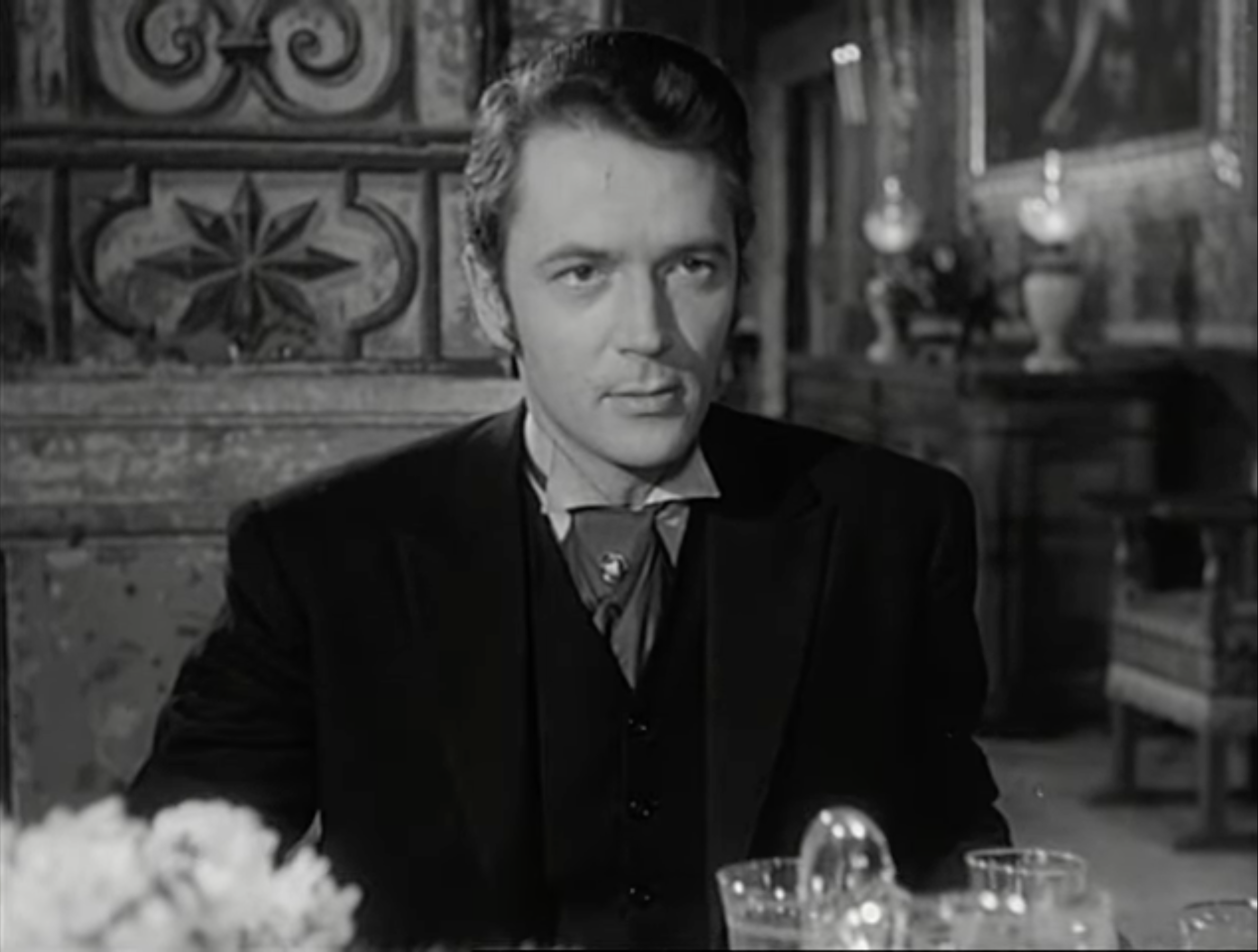
- Campbell in The Blind Woman of Sorrento (1953)
- Born: February 27, 1923; Washington, D.C., United States
- Died: March 17, 1999 (aged 76); New York, New York, USA
- Occupation: Actor
- Years active: 1947 - 1959

Paul Campbell (February 27, 1923 – March 17, 1999), was an American film actor. He appeared in over 30 films between 1947 and 1959.

Campbell was best known for his work at Columbia Pictures, where he usually portrayed tall, handsome leading men of the western genre. Modern viewers will recognize him as Clarence Cassidy, the cowardly cowboy in The Three Stooges film Merry Mavericks.

Campbell died on March 17, 1999, in New York City.

== Selected filmography ==
- Millie's Daughter (1947)
- Sport of Kings (1947)
- Last Days of Boot Hill (1947)
- Smoky River Serenade (1947)
- The Stranger from Ponca City (1947)
- Blazing Across the Pecos (1948)
- Six-Gun Law (1948)
- The Wreck of the Hesperus (1948)
- Desert Vigilante (1949)
- Across the Badlands (1950)
- The Great Plane Robbery (1950)
- Vigilante Hideout (1950)
- Smuggler's Gold (1952)
- The Golden Coach (1952)
- The Blind Woman of Sorrento (1953)
- Ivan, Son of the White Devil (1953)
- I Tre moschettieri (TV series, 1956)
- The Deadly Mantis (1957)
