= Hands Off Me! =

- Directed by: Gero Zambuto
- Written by: Guglielmo Giannini, Gero Zambuto
- Produced by: Gustavo Lombardo
- Starring: Totò, Tina Pica
- Cinematography: Otello Martelli
- Edited by: Giacinto Solito
- Music by: Umberto Mancini
- Production company: Titanus
- Distributed by: Titanus
- Release date: 1937
- Running time: 77 minutes
- Country: Italy
- Language: Italian

Hands Off Me! (Italian: Fermo con le mani) is a 1937 Italian "white-telephones" comedy film directed by Gero Zambuto.

The film is notable for being the screen début of Totò. Its most famous scenes include one in which he tries to give a haircut to a bald man; another one where he fishes from the fishmonger's counter (this scene was repeated in Cops and Robbers and Toto in Paris) and also the scene in which he holds a broom, using it as a gun (shooting in "Figaro here, Figaro there"). The scene involving the conductor was also repeated in many subsequent films.

It was shot at the Safa Palatino Studios in Rome.

== Plot ==
In his first story, Totò plays the poor wanderer who meets up with a gentleman in poor economic conditions. The two try to earn a living as best they can, but they always incur misfortune and hatred because of their ineptitude. After being kicked out of a beauty salon because he was disguised as a nurse, Totò makes a bet between nobles and later wins a competition and a lot of money after replacing a famous conductor who was sick. Here Totò will show his theatrical flair performing in the famous gag of "Uncoordinated muppet". After having won the satisfactory sum, Totò will also discover to be of a noble family.

== Cast ==
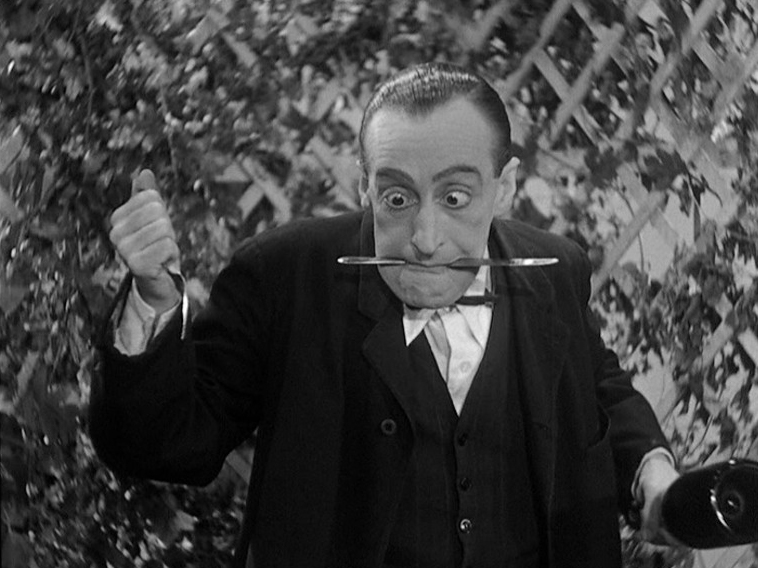
Totò in a scene of the film

- Totò: Count Totò di Torretota
- Tina Pica: Giulia
- Franco Coop: Vincenzino
- Oreste Bilancia: Cavalier Gerolamo Battaglia
- Cesare Polacco: Capomastro
- Guglielmo Sinaz: il capo cameriere
- Miranda Bonansea: Bambina

== Bibliography ==
- Moliterno, Gino. Historical Dictionary of Italian Cinema. Scarecrow Press, 2008; ISBN 0810860732/ISBN 9780810860735.
