= Marjorie Deanne =

American film actress (1917–94)

- Born: Clara Pauline Baughton; January 28, 1917; Brownsville, Texas, U.S.
- Died: May 21, 1994 (aged 77); Redwood City, California; U.S.
- Years active: 1938-1943

Marjorie Deanne (January 28, 1917 – May 21, 1994) was an American film actress. She appeared in over 25 films between 1938 and 1943. Modern viewers will recognize Deanne for her appearances in several Three Stooges films such as Violent Is the Word for Curly, Dutiful But Dumb and Matri-Phony.

Deane was born Clara Pauline Baughton in Brownsville, Texas. She won the Miss Texas of 1935 beauty contest. Before she began acting in films, she worked as a representative of a shirt and hosiery manufacturing company.

Deanne married Albert Manuck on March 19, 1944, in New Orleans, Louisiana.

Deanne died in Redwood City, California in 1994.
