= Of Cash and Hash =

1955 American short film by Jules White

- Directed by: Jules White; Del Lord (stock footage)
- Written by: Jack White
- Produced by: Jules White
- Starring: Moe Howard; Larry Fine; Shemp Howard; Vernon Dent; Christine McIntyre; Kenneth MacDonald; Frank Lackteen; Duke York; Stanley Blystone; Cy Schindell
- Cinematography: Ray Cory
- Edited by: Robert B. Hoover
- Distributed by: Columbia Pictures
- Release date: February 3, 1955 (U.S.)
- Running time: 15:52
- Country: United States
- Language: English

Of Cash and Hash is a 1955 short subject directed by Jules White starring American slapstick comedy team The Three Stooges (Moe Howard, Larry Fine and Shemp Howard). It is the 160th entry in the series released by Columbia Pictures starring the comedians, who released 190 shorts for the studio between 1934 and 1959.

== Plot ==
The Stooges become ensnared in a case of mistaken identity when they are erroneously implicated in an armored car robbery, a predicament exacerbated by their inadvertent involvement in a crossfire incident. Subsequently, Captain Mullins subjects the trio to a lie detector examination, a procedure aimed at discerning their culpability in the alleged offense. However, the results of the examination absolve them of any wrongdoing, leading to their release from custody. Following their exoneration, they return to their regular duties at the Elite Café.

Upon the fortuitous arrival of acquaintance Gladys Harmon at the restaurant, a turn of events unfolds as one of the actual perpetrators of the armored car robbery hastily departs the vicinity. In a bid to apprehend the fugitive, the Stooges initiate a pursuit that culminates in their arrival at a decrepit mansion serving as the clandestine refuge for the bandits and their menacing enforcer, Angel.

The situation escalates when Gladys becomes the target of abduction by the criminal syndicate. In response, the Stooges undertake a valiant rescue mission, successfully liberating Gladys from captivity while also recovering the pilfered funds.

== Cast ==
=== Credited ===
- Moe Howard as Moe
- Larry Fine as Larry
- Shemp Howard as Shemp
- Christine McIntyre as Gladys Harmon
- Vernon Dent as Captain Mullins (stock footage)
- Kenneth MacDonald as Lefty Loomis
- Frank Lackteen as Red Watkins

=== Uncredited ===
- Joe Palma as Armored car guard
  - Palma as lie detector technician (stock footage)
- Tommy Kingston as second Armored car guard
- Cy Schindell as Officer Jackson (stock footage)
- Blackie Whiteford as second policeman (stock footage)
- Stanley Blystone as Elite Café customer
- Duke York as Angel (stock footage)

== Production notes ==
Of Cash and Hash is a remake of 1948's Shivering Sherlocks, using ample recycled footage from the original. New footage was filmed on April 26, 1954.

This was the last film with new footage of long-time Stooge actress Christine McIntyre, who later appeared in six more Stooge films using stock footage. It also marked the final appearance of Columbia supporting actor Stanley Blystone and villainous actor Frank Lackteen in a Three Stooges film.

== See also ==
- List of American films of 1955
