= Virginia Hunter =

American actress (1920–2012)

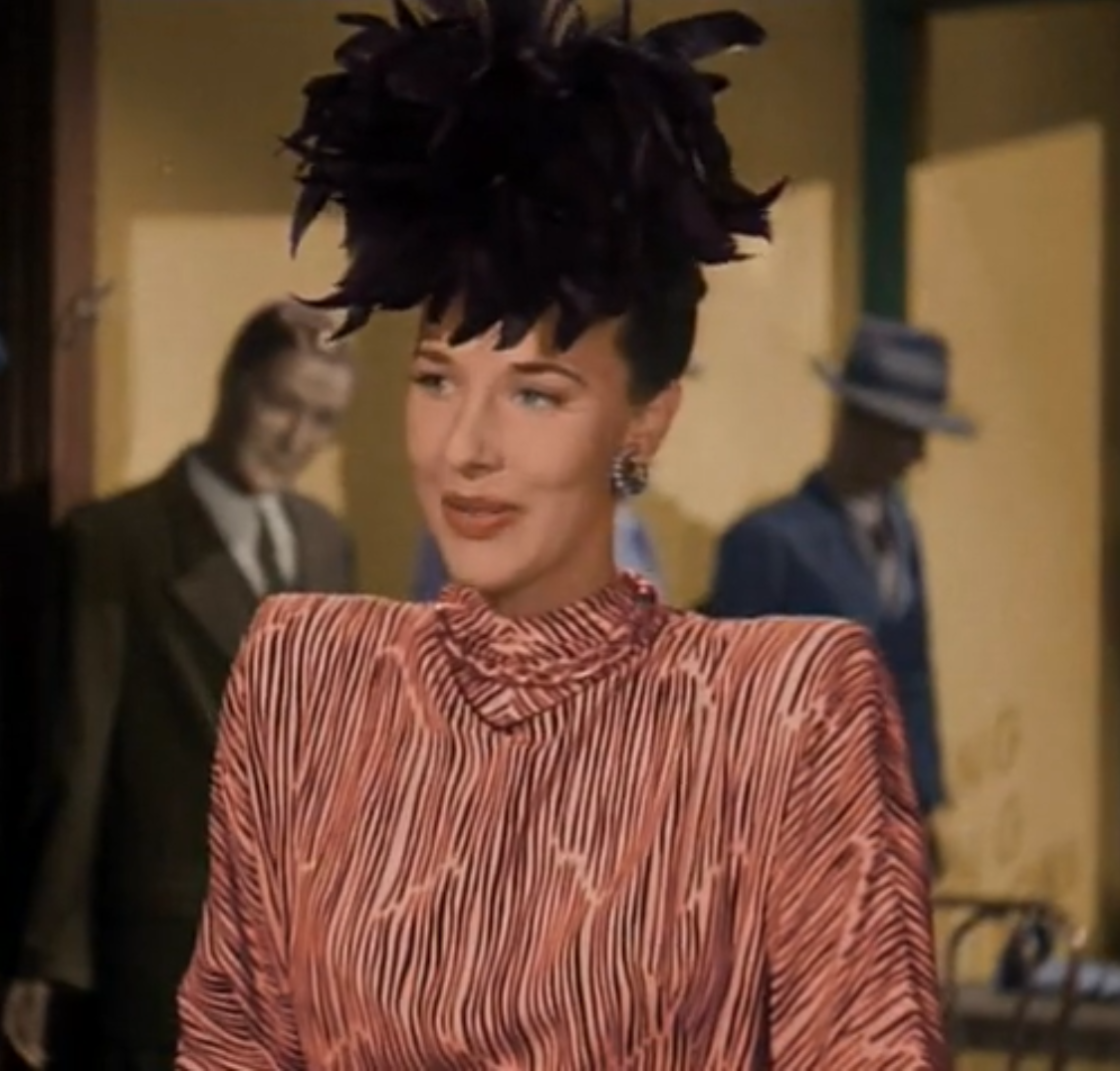
- Hunter in the short film Sing a Song of Six Pants (1947)
- Born: Virginia Reed; February 17, 1920; Springfield, Missouri, U.S.
- Died: March 23, 2012 (aged 92); Hemet, California, U.S.
- Occupation: Actress
- Years active: 1942–1955
- Spouse: Henry Hunter (m. 1952; div. 1954)

Virginia Hunter (née Reed; February 17, 1920 – March 23, 2012) was an American model and actress. She appeared in over 20 films during the 1940s.

== Early years ==
Hunter was the daughter of Freeman A. Reed. Hunter grew up in Tulsa, Oklahoma, before her family moved to Los Angeles in 1940.

== Career ==
Hunter signed with Columbia Pictures. At Columbia, she performed in the Jack Cole Dance group before acting in films. She quickly became known to matinee audiences at the time for co-starring in four of the Durango Kid films. She had a supporting role in The Mating of Millie, starring Glenn Ford and Evelyn Keyes; and played the Muse Clio in the 1947 Down to Earth, which starred Rita Hayworth.

To modern viewers, Hunter is known for her roles in several Three Stooges films from the Shemp Howard era, specifically Sing a Song of Six Pants, I'm a Monkey's Uncle (and its remake Stone Age Romeos) and Fiddlers Three (and its remake Musty Musketeers).

== Later years ==
After her time with Columbia, Hunter worked as a model and a store manager. After retirement, she lived with her older brother in Las Vegas.

== Personal life and death ==
On November 2, 1952, Hunter married to Henry "Mac" Hunter, a golfer. They were divorced on February 8, 1954. She died on March 23, 2012, in Hemet, California at age 92.
