= Three Loan Wolves =

1946 film by Jules White

- Directed by: Jules White
- Written by: Felix Adler
- Produced by: Jules White
- Starring: Moe Howard; Larry Fine; Curly Howard; Beverly Warren; Harold Brauer; Jackie Jackson; Joe Palma; Wally Rose
- Cinematography: George F. Kelley
- Edited by: Edwin H. Bryant
- Distributed by: Columbia Pictures
- Release date: July 4, 1946 (U.S.)
- Running time: 16:50
- Country: United States
- Language: English

Three Loan Wolves is a 1946 short subject directed by Jules White starring American slapstick comedy team The Three Stooges (Moe Howard, Larry Fine and Curly Howard). It is the 93rd entry in the series released by Columbia Pictures starring the comedians, who released 190 shorts for the studio between 1934 and 1959.

== Plot ==
In a narrative framed as a retrospective recounted to their son, the Stooges disclose the origins of their unexpected fatherhood. As proprietors of a pawn shop burdened by debts to the Gashouse Protection Society, a syndicate of loan sharks, the Stooges find themselves embroiled in a series of misadventures.

Their troubles escalate when a woman, in collusion with the loan sharks, leaves an infant in their care as part of a ruse to peddle a counterfeit diamond. Obliged to care for the child, the Stooges grapple with their newfound paternal responsibilities, navigating inept attempts to pacify the crying baby, which inadvertently lead to further chaos.

Amidst their comedic struggles, the trio confronts the loan sharks' demands for repayment, culminating in a showdown where they emerge victorious over the criminals. As the tale concludes, the child, now aware of his true origins, seeks out his biological mother. Moe and Curly blame Larry for the ordeal, and start to spank him and pull out his air as punishment.

== Cast ==
=== Credited ===
- Moe Howard as Moe
- Larry Fine as Larry
- Curly Howard as Curly
- Harold Brauer as Butch McGee
- Beverly Warren as Molly

=== Uncredited ===
- Jackie Jackson as Egbert
- Wally Rose as Henchman
- Joe Palma as Henchman

== Production notes ==
The title is a parody of Columbia's movie series "The Lone Wolf."

This is the eleventh of sixteen Stooge shorts with the word "three" in the title.

The theme reverts to the syncopated, jazzy version of "Three Blind Mice" previously used on Gents Without Cents, Three Pests in a Mess, Booby Dupes and Idiots Deluxe instead of the revamped, 'sliding strings' version used during this period.

=== Curly's illness ===
Three Loan Wolves was filmed February 27-March 2, 1946, near the end of Curly Howard's career. The 42-year-old comedian had suffered a series of minor strokes several months prior to filming, and his performances had been unpredictable. By the time of Three Loan Wolves, he had lost a considerable amount of weight, and lines had creased his face. Larry Fine and Moe Howard look stocky by comparison.

While director Edward Bernds devised ways to cover Curly's illness, Jules White simply gave most of Curly's lines to Larry. With Three Loan Wolves, White made Larry the main character (his first time in the spotlight since the Stooges' inaugural short for Columbia Pictures in 1934, Woman Haters), with nearly the entire film revolving around him. Curly also tried desperately to maintain his falsetto voice, but was clearly unable to.

Beverly Warren appeared at a 2003 Three Stooges convention in Fort Washington, Pennsylvania, and reported that Curly's illness was not discussed on the set. She added that filming was completed at such a rapid pace, she rarely saw Curly or Moe (as she only shared screen time with Larry).
