= The Blind Woman of Sorrento (1953 film) =

- Spanish film poster
- Directed by: Giacomo Gentilomo
- Written by: Francesco Mastriani (novel); Ivo Perilli; Liana Ferri
- Produced by: Giacomo Savelli
- Starring: Antonella Lualdi; Paul Campbell; Vera Carmi; Paul Müller
- Cinematography: Romolo Garroni
- Edited by: Elsa Dubbini
- Music by: Carlo Rustichelli
- Production company: Cine Produzione Astoria
- Release date: February 1953
- Running time: 93 minutes
- Country: Italy
- Language: Italian

The Blind Woman of Sorrento (Italian: La cieca di Sorrento) is a 1953 Italian historical romantic drama film directed by Giacomo Gentilomo and starring Antonella Lualdi, Paul Campbell and Enzo Biliotti. It was shot at the Cinecittà Studios in Rome. The film is based on the novel of the same title by Francesco Mastriani and is the third time that it has been filmed. It is set in the nineteenth century in Sorrento in southern Italy.

== Plot ==
In the 19th century, Naples was governed by the Bourbons. Doctor Pisani is a patriot who is unjustly accused of having killed a marquise. He does not want to betray the cause and allows himself to be executed. Ten years later, his son Oliviero, who has taken medical courses, restores the truth and wants to marry Béatrice, the Marquise's daughter, who became blind during the assault on her mother's castle by revolutionary patriots. Oliviero, having become an ophthalmologist, heals the girl and marries her.

== Cast ==
- Antonella Lualdi as Beatrice di Rionero
- Paul Campbell as Oliviero Pisani
- Enzo Biliotti as Ernesto Basileo, il notaio
- Marilyn Buferd as Marchesina di Rionero
- Charles Fawcett as Marchese di Rionero
- Corrado Annicelli as Dottore Andrea Pisani
- Vera Carmi as Elena Viscardi
- Paul Muller as Carlo Basileo
- Nuccia Aronne as Beatrice di Rionero, bambina
- Michele Riccardini as Un congiurato
- Giovanni Onorato as Altro congiurato
- Maurizio Di Nardo as Oliviero, ragazzino
- Giuliano Montaldo as Sacerdote
- Sergio Bergonzelli
- Carlo d'Elia
- Giovanni Vari
- Franco Marturano
- Rina Dei
- Patrizia Lari
- Gianni Luda
- Vittorio Braschi
- Annette Ciarli
- Carlo Hinterman
- Anna Maini
- Ina La Yana
- Raffaele Caporilli
