= The Blind Woman of Sorrento (1916 film) =

- Directed by: Gustavo Serena
- Written by: Francesco Mastriani (novel)
- Starring: Alfredo De Antoni; Olga Benetti; Carlo Benetti; Gustavo Serena
- Production company: Caesar Film
- Distributed by: Caesar Film
- Release date: May 1916
- Country: Italy
- Languages: Silent; Italian intertitles

The Blind Woman of Sorrento (Italian:La cieca di Sorrento) is a 1916 Italian silent drama film directed by Gustavo Serena and starring Alfredo De Antoni, Olga Benetti and Carlo Benetti. It is set in the nineteenth century in Sorrento in southern Italy. It is an adaptation of the 1852 novel of the same title by Francesco Mastriani. Subsequent adaptations were made in 1934, 1952 and 1963.

== Cast ==
- Alfredo De Antoni
- Carlo Benetti
- Olga Benetti
- Gustavo Serena
- Domenico Cini
- Bianca Cipriani
- Lea Giunchi
- Giorgio Gizzi

== Bibliography ==
- Poppi, Roberto. I registi: dal 1930 ai giorni nostri.
