= Stanley Blystone =

American actor (1894–1956)

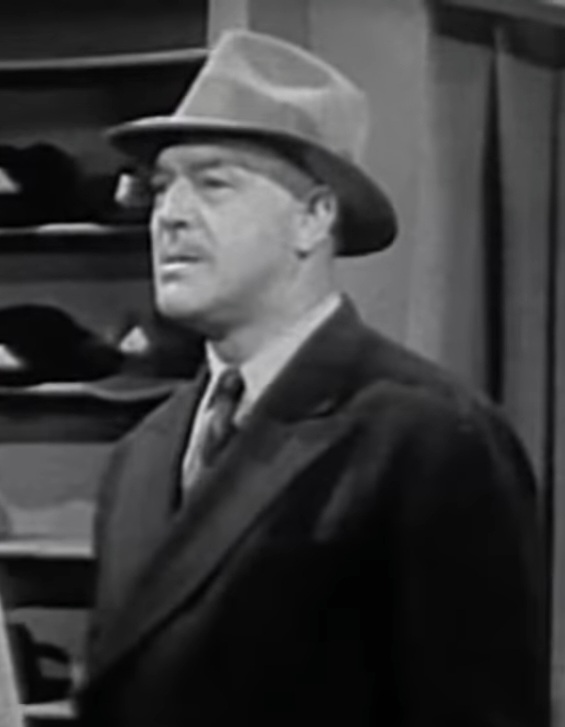
- Blystone in So's Your Aunt Emma (1942)
- Born: William Stanley Blystone; August 1, 1894; Eau Claire, Wisconsin, U.S.
- Died: July 16, 1956 (aged 61); Hollywood, California, U.S.
- Resting place: Valhalla Memorial Park Cemetery
- Other names: William Blystone; William Stanley
- Occupation: Actor
- Years active: 1924–1956
- Spouse: Alma Tell (m. 1932; died 1937)

William Stanley Blystone (August 1, 1894 – July 16, 1956) was an American film actor who made more than 500 films appearances from 1924 to 1956. He was sometimes billed as William Blystone or William Stanley.

== Early years ==
Blystone was born in Eau Claire, Wisconsin. He was a steel production engineer and worked in ore mines before he became an actor.

== Career ==
Blystone is best known for his appearance in Charlie Chaplin's Modern Times, playing Paulette Goddard's father, and several short films starring The Three Stooges. Some of his more memorable roles were in the films Half Shot Shooters, False Alarms, Goofs and Saddles, Three Little Twirps and Slaphappy Sleuths. His final appearance with the trio was Of Cash and Hash in 1955. He also appeared in several Laurel and Hardy films.

== Personal life and death ==
Blystone was married to Hollywood starlet Alma Tell. He was the brother of film director John G. Blystone.

Blystone was walking on a Hollywood sidewalk on July 16, 1956, when he collapsed, dying of a sudden heart attack. He was dressed as a cowboy for the Desilu The Life and Legend of Wyatt Earp television series and was pronounced dead on arrival at Hollywood Receiving Hospital. He was buried at Pierce Brothers Valhalla Memorial Park Cemetery in North Hollywood, California.

== Filmography ==
- Excitement (1924) - Freddie
- Darwin Was Right (1924) - Courtney Lawson
- Ranger Bill (1925)
- Under the Rouge (1925) - Jim Condon
- One Sunday Morning (1926, Short)
- Flirty Four-Flushers (1926, Short) - Joe - Aggie's Sweetheart
- The Circus Ace (1927) - Boss Convas Man
- The Circus (1928) - Cop (uncredited)
- Sharp Shooters (1928) - Bouncer (uncredited)
- Four Sons (1928) - Officer (uncredited)
- Synthetic Sin (1929) - Member of Frank's Gang #2
- Thru Different Eyes (1929) - Reporter
- Parade of the West (1930) - Dude
- Young Eagles (1930) - Captain Deming
- Redemption (1930) - Minor Role (uncredited)
- The Fighting Legion (1930) - Burl Edwards
- Born Reckless (1930) - Newspaper Worker (uncredited)
- The Laurel-Hardy Murder Case (1930, Short) - Detective (uncredited)
- Noche de duendes (1930) - Un detective (uncredited)
- Men on Call (1930) - Coast Guardsman (uncredited)
- Ex-Plumber (1931, Short) - Addie's Husband
- Cracked Nuts (1931) - Man at Elevator (uncredited)
- A Connecticut Yankee (1931) - King's Knight (uncredited)
- Partners of the Trail (1931) - Henchman (uncredited)
- Dancing Dynamite (1931) - Bull Evans
- The Man from Death Valley (1931) - Sheriff Jeffries
- Sundown Trail (1931) - Joe Currier
- Galloping Thru (1931) - Wallis
- Law and Order (1932) - Lynch Mob Leader (uncredited)
- The Trial of Vivienne Ware (1932) - Cop Who Kills Parone (uncredited)
- State's Attorney (1932) - Assistant District Attorney (uncredited)
- Honor of the Mounted (1932) - Scott Blakely, aka Carey
- Miss Pinkerton (1932) - First Police Guard (uncredited)
- The Painted Woman (1932) - Court Extra (uncredited)
- Hold 'Em Jail (1932) - Kravette
- Flaming Gold (1932) - Bar Debtor (uncredited)
- Wild Girl (1932) - Deputy (uncredited)
- The Golden West (1932) - Major (uncredited)
- Tess of the Storm Country (1922) - Seaman (uncredited)
- Lucky Larrigan (1932) - Kirk Warren
- Man of Action (1933) - Curt Masters
- Parachute Jumper (1933) - Cop (uncredited)
- Phantom Thunderbolt (1933) - Henchman Flash (uncredited)
- Fast Workers (1933) - Cop in Alley (uncredited)
- Internal Machine (1933) - Minor Role (uncredited)
- Picture Snatcher (1933) - Prison Guard (uncredited)
- The Nuisance (1933) - Policeman at Skating Rink (uncredited)
- Cross Fire (1933) - Kreuger - Henchman
- Strange People (1933) - Al Burke
- The Fighting Parson (1933) - Bart McCade
- Before Dawn (1933) - Police Car Driver (uncredited)
- The Last Trail (1933) - Motorcycle Cop (uncredited)
- The Wolf Dog (1933) - Lang
- Dancing Lady (1933) - Traffic Cop (uncredited)
- Roman Scandals (1933) - Cop / Roman Jailer (uncredited)
- Sons of the Desert (1933) - Brawny Speakeasy Manager (uncredited)
- Moulin Rouge (1934) - Traffic Cop (uncredited)
- Palooka (1934) - Second House Detective (uncredited)
- Hips, Hips, Hooray! (1934) - Race Driver (uncredited)
- Looking for Trouble (1934) - Fire Officer (uncredited)
- A Very Honorable Guy (1934) - Man at Tea Party (uncredited)
- We're Not Dressing (1934) - Ship's Officer - Yacht Doris (uncredited)
- Manhattan Melodrama (1934) - Detective in Court (uncredited)
- Murder at the Vanities (1934) - Policeman (uncredited)
- Such Women Are Dangerous (1934) - Turnkey (uncredited)
- Burn 'Em Up Barnes (1934, Serial) - Henchman Joe Stevens [Chs. 3-12] (uncredited)
- The Hell Cat (1934) - Chief Boatswain Mate (uncredited)
- The Man with Two Faces (1934) - Detective Monahan (uncredited)
- The Party's Over (1934) - Bartender (uncredited)
- The Case of the Howling Dog (1934) - Juror (uncredited)
- The Lemon Drop Kid (1934) - Second Cop (uncredited)
- We Live Again (1934) - Guard in Cell (uncredited)
- In Old Santa Fe (1934) - Hank - Henchman (uncredited)
- Broadway Bill (1934) - Jailer (uncredited)
- The Silver Streak (1934) - Detective (uncredited)
- Hell in the Heavens (1934) - French Mechanic (uncredited)
- Mills of the Gods (1934) - Bit Role (uncredited)
- Helldorado (1935) - Man in Car (uncredited)
- Under Pressure (1935) - Man Lock Tender's Helper (uncredited)
- The Mystery Man (1935) - Bar Waiter (uncredited)
- When a Man's a Man (1935) - Mover (uncredited)
- Carnival (1935) - Detective (uncredited)
- Restless Knights (1935, Short) - Captain of the Guard (uncredited)
- The Whole Town's Talking (1935) - Charlie - Clerk (uncredited)
- The Phantom Empire (1935, Serial) - Gaspar - Television Operator (uncredited)
- In Spite of Danger (1935) - Chekcer (uncredited)
- The Revenge Rider (1935) - Saunders (uncredited)
- I'll Love You Always (1935) - Bill Collector (uncredited)
- The Nut Farm (1935) - Holland's Asst. Cameraman (uncredited)
- Les Misérables (1935) - Gendarme in Prefect's Office (uncredited)
- G Men (1935) - Cop (uncredited)
- Vagabond Lady (1935) - Hotel Detective (uncredited)
- Men of the Hour (1935) - Policeman (uncredited)
- The Awakening of Jim Burke (1935) - Minor Role (uncredited)
- Fighting Pioneers (1935) - Hadley
- Justice of the Range (1935) - San Mateo Sheriff (uncredited)
- Ginger (1935) - Detective (uncredited)
- Saddle Aces (1935) - Pete Sutton
- Code of the Mounted (1935) - Town Constable
- Ladies Crave Excitement (1935) - Joe (uncredited)
- The Roaring West (1935, Serial) - Night Deputy [ch. 2] (uncredited)
- Rainbow's End (1935) - Dorgan - Ranch Foreman
- The Daring Young Man (1935) - Guard (uncredited)
- Smart Girl (1935) - (uncredited)
- The Farmer Takes a Wife (1935) - Fred (uncredited)
- Orchids to You (1935) - Salesman (uncredited)
- Trails End (1935) - Randall, Foreman of the Bar X
- Page Miss Glory (1935) - Policeman at Railroad Station (uncredited)
- Redheads on Parade (1935) - Grip (uncredited)
- Thunder in the Night (1935) - Policeman (uncredited)
- The Public Menace (1935) - Policeman (uncredited)
- The Three Musketeers (1935) - Villard - de Winter's Captain (uncredited)
- Bad Boy (1935) - Gunman (uncredited)
- A Night at the Opera (1935) - Ship's Officer (uncredited)
- The Ivory-Handled Gun (1935) - Squint Barlow
- Annie Oakley (1935) - Shooting Match Judge (uncredited)
- The Fighting Marines (1935, Serial) - Crawley - Henchman (uncredited)
- One Way Ticket (1935) - State Police officer (uncredited)
- Gallant Defender (1935) - Uncle Marvin (uncredited)
- Super Speed (1935) - Policeman (uncredited)
- Show Them No Mercy! (1935) - Announcer (uncredited)
- The Littlest Rebel (1935) - Party Guest (uncredited)
- Strike Me Pink (1936) - Miller
- Modern Times (1936) - The Gamin's Father
- You May Be Next (1936) - Printer's Devil (uncredited)
- Hell-Ship Morgan (1936) - Lookout (uncredited)
- The Prisoner of Shark Island (1936) - Minor Role (uncredited)
- Here Comes Trouble (1936) - Detective
- Murder at Glen Athol (1936) - Henchman Joe (uncredited)
- The Little Red Schoolhouse (1936) - Reformatory Guard (uncredited)
- The Country Doctor (1936) - Logger (uncredited)
- Silly Billies (1936) - Cavalry Captain (uncredited)
- Comin' Round the Mountain (1936) - Gambler (uncredited)
- Half Shot Shooters (1936, Short) - Sgt. MacGillicuddy
- The Moon's Our Home (1936) - Cop (uncredited)
- The Ex-Mrs. Bradford (1936) - Police Radio Operator (uncredited)
- Human Cargo (1936) - Detective (uncredited)
- Little Miss Nobody (1936) - Policeman (uncredited)
- The Last Outlaw (1936) - Jailer (uncredited)
- The Riding Avenger (1936) - Mort Ringer
- False Alarms (1936, Short) - Fire Captain Ashe (uncredited)
- Sing, Baby, Sing (1936) - Kelly (uncredited)
- The Vigilantes Are Coming (1936, Serial) - Kramer (uncredited)
- The Three Mesquiteers (1936) - Henchman (uncredited)
- End of the Trail (1936) - Bartender (uncredited)
- Ace Drummond (1936, Serial) Sergei - Henchman (uncredited)
- Come and Get It (1936) - Lumberjack (uncredited)
- Smartest Girl in Town (1936) - Man in Room 216 (uncredited)
- Pennies from Heaven (1936) - Detective Gilroy (uncredited)
- Charlie Chan at the Opera (1936) - Backstage Cop Who Shoots Gravelle (uncredited)
- We Who Are About to Die (1937) - Plainclothesman with Rifle (uncredited)
- Jail Bait (1937, Short) - Arresting Officer (uncredited)
- You Only Live Once (1937) - Rafferty - Guard (uncredited)
- She's Dangerous (1937) - Cop (uncredited)
- Two Wise Maids (1937) - Jim Butch
- Murder Goes to College (1937) - (uncredited)
- The Man Who Found Himself (1937) - John (uncredited)
- King of Gamblers (1937) - Man at Table (uncredited)
- Behind the Headlines (1937) - Fire Chief (uncredited)
- Charlie Chan at the Olympics (1937) - New York Policeman (uncredited)
- There Goes My Girl (1937) - Pedestrian (uncredited)
- Armored Car (1937) - Lt. Shores (uncredited)
- Love in a Bungalow (1937) - Policeman
- Goofs and Saddles (1937, Short) - Longhorn Pete (uncredited)
- Galloping Dynamite (1937) - Lew Wilkes
- The Toast of New York (1937) - Sheriff (uncredited)
- Windjammer (1937) - Peterson
- The Life of Emile Zola (1937) - (uncredited)
- Hot Water (1937) - Radio Officer (uncredited)
- Youth on Parole (1937) - Store Detective (uncredited)
- Radio Patrol (1937, Serial) - Plant Foreman (uncredited)
- Boots and Saddles (1937) - Army Sergeant
- Music for Madame (1937) - Policeman (uncredited)
- Second Honeymoon (1937) - Policeman (uncredited)
- High Flyers (1937) - Cop on Pier (uncredited)
- Manhattan Merry-Go-Round (1937) - Detective (uncredited)
- Headin' East (1937) - Bert Lohman
- Tim Tyler's Luck (1937, Serial) - Capt. Clark
- The Buccaneer (1938) - Pirate (uncredited)
- The Jury's Secret (1938) - Speech Observer (uncredited)
- Spirit of Youth (1938) - Storage and Transfer Co. Boss (uncredited)
- Bringing Up Baby (1938) - Doorman (uncredited)
- Born to Be Wild (1938) - Henchman (uncredited)
- Dangerous to Know (1938) - Motorcycle Cop (uncredited)
- Mr. Moto's Gamble (1938) - Policeman (uncredited)
- Go Chase Yourself (1938) - Policeman in Backwards Car (uncredited)
- Law of the Underworld (1938) - Policeman (uncredited)
- Joy of Living (1938) - Cop at Dock (uncredited)
- Swiss Miss (1938) - Doorman (uncredited)
- Blind Alibi (1938) - Detective (uncredited)
- The Devil's Party (1938) - Policeman with Doorman (uncredited)
- The Saint in New York (1938) - Policeman at the Zoo (uncredited)
- Crime Ring (1938) - Trooper (uncredited)
- Smashing the Rackets (1938) - Policeman (uncredited)
- Boys Town (1938) - Guard (uncredited)
- Valley of the Giants (1938) - Bartender (uncredited)
- The Affairs of Annabel (1938) - Cop (uncredited)
- Fugitives for a Night (1938) - Doorman at Jericho Club (uncredited)
- Room Service (1938) - Policeman in Alley (uncredited)
- The Stranger from Arizona (1938) - Banker Haskell
- Time Out for Murder (1938) - Detective at Johnny's Grilling (uncredited)
- King of Alcatraz (1938) - Second Officer (uncredited)
- Touchdown, Army (1938) - Major - Battalion Board Office (uncredited)
- Service de Luxe (1938) - Boat captain (uncredited)
- Cipher Bureau (1938) - Army Lieutenant (uncredited)
- Little Tough Guys in Society (1938) - Policeman (uncredited)
- Next Time I Marry (1938) - Police Radio Announcer (uncredited)
- California Frontier (1938) - Graham
- Red River Range (1938) - Randall
- Disbarred (1939) - Schaeffer (uncredited)
- Trigger Pals (1939) - Steve
- Drifting Westward (1939) - Carga
- Flying G-Men (1939, Serial) - Lacey (uncredited)
- Twelve Crowded Hours (1939) - Patrolman (uncredited)
- The Lone Ranger Rides Again (1939, Serial) - Murdock
- Everybody's Baby (1939) - Plainclothes Man (uncredited)
- They Made Her a Spy (1939) - Detective (uncredited)
- Man of Conquest (1939) - Goodwin Davis (uncredited)
- Mandrake the Magician (1939, Serial) - Henchman CX12 (uncredited)
- Three Texas Steers (1939) - Rankin
- Unmarried (1939) - Trainer (uncredited)
- Undercover Doctor (1939) - Secretary (uncredited)
- Charlie Chan in Reno (1939) - Lineup Officer (uncredited)
- Mr. Moto Takes a Vacation (1939) - Ship's Captain (uncredited)
- Way Down South (1939) - Slave Auctioneer (uncredited)
- They Shall Have Music (1939) - Policeman at Police Station (uncredited)
- The Spellbinder (1939) - Court Clerk - Second Trial (uncredited)
- When Tomorrow Comes (1939) - First Bus Driver (uncredited)
- The Man They Could Not Hang (1939) - Prison Guard (uncredited)
- Blackmail (1939) - Oil Worker (uncredited)
- Full Confession (1939) - Detective (uncredited)
- The Day the Bookies Wept (1939) - Racetrack Bookie / Cashier (uncredited)
- Those High Grey Walls (1939) - Guard (uncredited)
- The Escape (1939) - Policeman (uncredited)
- The Housekeeper's Daughter (1939) - Policeman (uncredited)
- Sued for Libel (1939) - Policeman in Court (uncredited)
- Torture Ship (1939) - Capt. Mike Briggs
- Allegheny Uprising (1939) - Settler at McDowell's Mill (uncredited)
- Tower of London (1939) - First Gate Guard Greeting Tom Clink (uncredited)
- Crashing Thru (1939) - Jim LaMont
- The Big Guy (1939) - City Police Captain (uncredited)
- A Chump at Oxford (1939) - Policeman (uncredited)
- Emergency Squad (1940) - Mack - Emergency Squad Sergeant (uncredited)
- The Man Who Wouldn't Talk (1940) - Police Announcer (uncredited)
- The Invisible Man Returns (1940) - Minor Role (uncredited)
- The Saint's Double Trouble (1940) - Detective Sadler (uncredited)
- Parole Fixer (1940) - Trainer (uncredited)
- Young Tom Edison (1940) - Army Officer on Train (uncredited)
- Framed (1940) - Police Sergeant (uncredited)
- Double Alibi (1940) - Police Sergeant (uncredited)
- Ma! He's Making Eyes at Me (1940) - Doorman (uncredited)
- Johnny Apollo (1940) - Guard in Library (uncredited)
- Dark Command (1940) - Tough (uncredited)
- Those Were the Days! (1940) - Policeman (uncredited)
- Pop Always Pays (1940) - Fingerprint Expert with Winton (uncredited)
- When the Daltons Rode (1940) - Deputy on Train (uncredited)
- Pier 13 (1940) - Policeman O'Hara (uncredited)
- Captain Caution (1940) - Tough Sailor in Brig (uncredited)
- The Tulsa Kid (1940) - Sam Ellis
- Dance, Girl, Dance (1940) - Plainclothesman at Palais Royale (uncredited)
- Ride, Tenderfoot, Ride (1940) - Packing House Employee (uncredited)
- Charlie Chan at the Wax Museum (1940) - Bailiff (uncredited)
- Spring Parade (1940) - Detective (uncredited)
- Remedy for Riches (1940) - Police Captain Jeff (uncredited)
- Little Men (1940) - Bartender (uncredited)
- Pony Post (1940) - Griff Atkins
- The Son of Monte Cristo (1940) - Max (uncredited)
- Murder Over New York (1940) - Fingerprint Expert (uncredited)
- Tall, Dark and Handsome (1941) - Policeman in Cigar Store
- Buck Privates (1941) - Recruiting Sergeant (uncredited)
- Golden Hoofs (1941) - Jonas (uncredited)
- Road Show (1941) - Brawler (uncredited)
- Back in the Saddle (1941) - Station Agent Jess (uncredited)
- Sky Raiders (1941, Serial) - Nevada Sheriff (uncredited)
- The Lady from Cheyenne (1941) - Bit Role (uncredited)
- Mutiny in the Arctic (1941) - The Bos'un
- Model Wife (1941) - Policeman (uncredited)
- Lady from Louisiana (1941) - Lottery Victim (uncredited)
- Country Fair (1941) - (uncredited)
- The Spider Returns (1941, Serial) - Policeman (uncredited)
- Sunset in Wyoming (1941) - Bull Wilson
- Mystery Ship (1941) - Detective at the Pier (uncredited)
- King of the Texas Rangers (1941, Serial) - A.J. Lynch
- Sea Raiders (1941, Serial) - Capt. Olaf Nelson
- I Wake Up Screaming (1941) - Detective (uncredited)
- Appointment for Love (1941) - Joe (uncredited)
- Holt of the Secret Service (1941, Serial) - J. Garrity (uncredited)
- West of Cimarron (1941) - Major Briggs (uncredited)
- Pacific Blackout (1941) - Sergeant (uncredited)
- Arizona Terrors (1942) - Karney (uncredited)
- Fly-by-Night (1942) - Policeman (uncredited)
- Pardon My Stripes (1942) - Guard (uncredited)
- Born to Sing (1942) - Detective (uncredited)
- Roxie Hart (1942) - Policeman (uncredited)
- Mr. Wise Guy (1942) - Policeman (uncredited)
- True to the Army (1942) - Police Officer (uncredited)
- Jesse James, Jr. (1942) - Sam Carson
- So's Your Aunt Emma (1942) - Detective Miller
- My Favorite Spy (1942) - Turnkey (uncredited)
- In Old California (1942) - San Francisco Deputy (uncredited)
- Powder Town (1942) - Security Guard Shooting Gun (uncredited)
- Timber (1942) - Lumberjack (uncredited)
- The Old Homestead (1942) - Policeman (uncredited)
- Even as IOU (1942, Short) - Ventriloquist
- The Traitor Within (1942) - Henchman (uncredited)
- Ice-Capades Revue (1942) - Cop (uncredited)
- Lady Bodyguard (1943) - Policeman (uncredited)
- The Adventures of Smilin' Jack (1943, Serial) - Capt. Harrigan [Chs. 5-6] (uncredited)
- City Without Men (1943) - Prison Guard (uncredited)
- Spook Louder (1943, Short) - Spy Leader
- Don Winslow of the Coast Guard (1943, Serial) - Detective Collins [Chs. 7, 11] (uncredited)
- Action in the North Atlantic (1943) - U.S. Commander (uncredited)
- Back from the Front (1943, Short) - German Captain (uncredited)
- Three Little Twirps (1943, Short) - Mr. Herman - Circus Director
- Phantom of the Opera (1943) - Officer (uncredited)
- Roger Touhy, Gangster (1944) - Cop (uncredited)
- Youth Runs Wild (1944) - Policeman in Opening Montage (uncredited)
- Navajo Kid (1945) - Matt Crandall
- The Scarlet Horseman (1946, Serial) - Railroad Engineer (uncredited)
- Six Gun Man (1946) - Cattleman Lon Kelly
- Moon Over Montana (1946) - Rancher Joseph Colton
- The People's Choice (1946) - Tom Flannigan
- The Hoodlum Saint (1946) - Cop Arresting Fishface (uncredited)
- Mysterious Intruder (1946) - Henry - Second Cop (uncredited)
- King of the Forest Rangers (1946, Serial) - Harry Lynch [Ch. 4]
- Chick Carter, Detective (1946, Serial) - Policeman (uncredited)
- Son of the Guardsman (1946, Serial) - Bullard Soldier (uncredited)
- Criminal Court (1946) - Stan - Bartender at Steve's Party (uncredited)
- Bringing Up Father (1946) - Deputy (uncredited)
- Magnificent Doll (1946) - Man Outside Courthouse (uncredited)
- Vacation in Reno (1946) - Bill - Policeman (uncredited)
- San Quentin (1946) - Fresno Police Captain (uncredited)
- That Brennan Girl (1946) - Party Guest (uncredited)
- California (1947) - Miner (uncredited)
- Jack Armstrong (1947, Serial) - Marlin (uncredited)
- The Thirteenth Hour (1947) - Police Detective (uncredited)
- Suddenly, It's Spring (1947) - Hotel Detective (uncredited)
- The Beginning or the End (1947) - Civilian Guard (uncredited)
- Backlash (1947) - Fire Warden at Car Wreck (uncredited)
- Fright Night (1947, Short) - First Policeman (uncredited)
- Shoot to Kill (1947) - Police Chief (uncredited)
- Hit Parade of 1947 (1947) - Cop (uncredited)
- Yankee Fakir (1947) - 2nd Wagon Driver (uncredited)
- Out West (1947, Short) - Colonel (uncredited)
- That's My Gal (1947) - Tough (uncredited)
- Too Many Winners (1947) - Chief Boyle (uncredited)
- Killer at Large (1947) - Captain McManus
- The Vigilantes Return (1947) - Deputy (uncredited)
- The Perils of Pauline (1947) - Reporter (uncredited)
- Something in the Wind (1947) - TV Station Guard (uncredited)
- The Sea Hound (1947, Serial) - Black Mike
- Joe Palooka in the Knockout (1947) - Policeman (uncredited)
- The Wild Frontier (1947) - Morgan (uncredited)
- Key Witness (1947) - Patrolman - Accident Scene (uncredited)
- Louisiana (1947)
- Her Husband's Affairs (1947) - Ike (uncredited)
- Under Colorado Skies (1947) - Mob Agitator (uncredited)
- Brick Bradford (1947, Serial) - Stevens - Sailor (uncredited)
- Road to Rio (1947) - Assistant Purser (uncredited)
- The Tender Years (1948) - Farmer (uncredited)
- Shivering Sherlocks (1948, Short) - Cafe Customer (uncredited)
- Pardon My Clutch (1948, Short) - Sanitorium Attendant (uncredited)
- The Bride Goes Wild (1948) - Bartender (uncredited)
- Big City (1948) - Mike - the Bartender (uncredited)
- Adventures in Silverado (1948) - Townsman (uncredited)
- Tex Granger (1948) - Marshal Peterson (uncredited)
- Smart Woman (1948) - Cop (uncredited)
- Fighting Father Dunne (1948) - Policeman (uncredited)
- I Wouldn't Be in Your Shoes (1948) - McGee
- I, Jane Doe (1948) - Policeman (uncredited)
- Eyes of Texas (1948) - Sheriff
- Station West (1948) - Bouncer (uncredited)
- The Gentleman from Nowhere (1948) - Bailiff (uncredited)
- The Denver Kid (1948) - Henchman with Coffee Pot (uncredited)
- The Strange Mrs. Crane (1948) - Court Bailiff (uncredited)
- El Dorado Pass (1948) - Barlow
- Words and Music (1948) - Brakeman (uncredited)
- Loaded Pistols (1948) - Ed Norton (uncredited)
- The Paleface (1948) - Saloon Patron Restraining Joe (uncredited)
- The Far Frontier (1948) - Doctor (uncredited)
- Rose of the Yukon (1949) - Workman (uncredited)
- Ride, Ryder, Ride! (1949) - Sheriff (uncredited)
- Rustlers (1949) - Rancher #3
- Ghost of Zorro (1949, Serial) - Dan Foster (uncredited)
- Manhandled (1949) - Cop (uncredited)
- The Doolins of Oklahoma (1949) - Jailer (uncredited)
- Alimony (1949) - Court Bailiff (uncredited)
- Calamity Jane and Sam Bass (1949) - Cowboy (uncredited)
- The Great Dan Patch (1949) - Chris - Work Crew Foreman (uncredited)
- That Midnight Kiss (1949) - Customer (uncredited)
- Navajo Trail Raiders (1949) - Deputy Fred (uncredited)
- Deputy Marshall (1949) - Leo Hanald
- Mary Ryan, Detective (1949) - Highway Patrolman Evans (uncredited)
- All the King's Men (1949) - Minor Role (uncredited)
- Master Minds (1949) - Henchman (uncredited)
- Powder River Rustlers (1949) - Rancher
- Samson and Delilah (1949) - (uncredited)
- Range Land (1949) - Marshal Matt Mosely
- The Lone Ranger (1949–1953, TV Series) - Sheriff Roberts / Sheriff / Sheriff Conners / Ray / Rancher with Pipe (uncredited)
- The Nevadan (1950) - Red Sand Bank Clerk (uncredited)
- Singing Guns (1950) - Deputy (uncredited)
- Square Dance Katy (1950) - Policeman
- Ma and Pa Kettle Go to Town (1950) - Train Conductor (uncredited)
- Comanche Territory (1950) - Rancher at Shindig (uncredited)
- Kill the Umpire (1950) - Policeman (uncredited)
- Six Gun Mesa (1950) - Chip Mullins
- Please Believe Me (1950) - Disembarking Ship Passenger (uncredited)
- The Iroquois Trail (1950) - Major (uncredited)
- Covered Wagon Raid (1950) - Jake (uncredited)
- Atom Man vs. Superman (1950, Serial) - Joe Evans - Interviewee [Ch. 12] (uncredited)
- The Underworld Story (1950) - Policeman (uncredited)
- County Fair (1950) - Rent Collector (uncredited)
- Desperadoes of the West (1950, Serial) - Storekeeper [Chs. 3-4]
- Triple Trouble (1950) - Captain of the Guards (uncredited)
- Lonely Heart Bandits (1950) - Police Officer (uncredited)
- Sunset in the West (1950) - Irate Townsman (uncredited)
- Chain Gang (1950) - Convict on Chain Gang (uncredited)
- Let's Dance (1950) - New York Policeman (uncredited)
- Hot Rod (1950) - Jewelry Store Proprietor (uncredited)
- Last of the Buccaneers (1950) - Pirate (uncredited)
- Slaphappy Sleuths (1950, Short) - Gang Leader
- Mrs. O'Malley and Mr. Malone (1950) - Train Passenger in Compartment Next to Lola's (uncredited)
- Trail of Robin Hood (1950) - Doctor (uncredited)
- Santa Fe (1951) - Deputy (uncredited)
- Gunplay (1951) - Storekeeper (uncredited)
- Silver Canyon (1951) - Soldier (uncredited)
- Rich, Young and Pretty (1951) - Servant (uncredited)
- Fort Worth (1951) - Townsman (uncredited)
- Mysterious Island (1951, Serial) - Confederate Officer (uncredited)
- The Whip Hand (1951) - Guard on Pier (uncredited)
- Hot Lead (1951) - Fowler - Deputy at Jail (uncredited)
- Yellow Fin (1951) - Husky Seaman at Table (uncredited)
- Honeychile (1951) - Mr. Olson
- Flight to Mars (1951) - Councilman (uncredited)
- Overland Telegraph (1951) - Sheriff (uncredited)
- My Favorite Spy (1951) - Guard (uncredited)
- Indian Uprising (1952) - Miner (uncredited)
- A Missed Fortune (1952, Short) - Detective (uncredited)
- The Cimarron Kid (1952) - Train Passenger (uncredited)
- Colorado Sundown (1952) - Bill (uncredited)
- Rancho Notorious (1952) - Rancher in Posse (uncredited)
- Road Agent (1952) - Tom Barton
- Carson City (1952) - Mine Owner (uncredited)
- Here Come the Marines (1952) - Doctor (uncredited)
- The Duel at Silver Creek (1952) - Sam (voice, uncredited)
- Feudin' Fools (1952) - The Sheriff (uncredited)
- The Golden Hawk (1952) - Pirate Lookout (uncredited)
- The Raiders (1952) - Miner (uncredited)
- The Lawless Breed (1952) - Card-Player (uncredited)
- Prince of Pirates (1953) - Captain Brock's First Mate (uncredited)
- The Lone Hand (1953) - Citizen (uncredited)
- Jack McCall, Desperado (1953) - Judge (uncredited)
- A Perilous Journey (1953) - Ad Lib (uncredited)
- Abbott and Costello Go to Mars (1953) - Minor Role (uncredited)
- Law and Order (1953) - Checkers Player (uncredited)
- The Great Sioux Uprising (1953) - Townsman at Buckboard (uncredited)
- The Last Posse (1953) - Townsman (uncredited)
- Devil's Canyon (1953) - Minor Role (uncredited)
- The Great Adventures of Captain Kidd (1953, Serial) - Bostonian (uncredited)
- Calamity Jane (1953) - Saloon Patron (uncredited)
- Jesse James vs. the Daltons (1954) - Lucas Gibbons (uncredited)
- Living It Up (1954) - Ike - the Train Engineer (uncredited)
- The Raid (1954) - Townsman (uncredited)
- Three Hours to Kill (1954) - Townsman (uncredited)
- Masterson of Kansas (1954) - Judge (uncredited)
- Destry (1954) - Townsman (uncredited)
- Pals and Gals (1954, Short) - Pete (archive footage) (uncredited)
- Of Cash and Hash (1955, Short) - Customer (uncredited)
- Jupiter's Darling (1955) - Citizen (uncredited)
- Headline Hunters (1955) - Night Watchman (uncredited)
- A Lawless Street (1955) - Rancher (uncredited)
- Glory (1956) - Derby Spectator (uncredited)
- Pardners (1956) - Townsman (uncredited)
