= Dutiful But Dumb =

1941 film by Del Lord

- Directed by: Del Lord
- Written by: Elwood Ullman
- Produced by: Del Lord; Hugh McCollum
- Starring: Moe Howard; Larry Fine; Curly Howard; Vernon Dent; Bud Jamison; Fred Kelsey; Eddie Laughton; Chester Conklin; Harry Semels; Marjorie Deanne; Stanley Brown; Lew Davis
- Cinematography: Benjamin H. Kline
- Edited by: Art Seid
- Distributed by: Columbia Pictures
- Release date: March 21, 1941 (U.S.)
- Running time: 16:47
- Country: United States
- Language: English

Dutiful But Dumb is a 1941 short subject directed by Del Lord starring American slapstick comedy team The Three Stooges (Moe Howard, Larry Fine and Curly Howard). It is the 54th entry in the series released by Columbia Pictures starring the comedians, who released 190 shorts for the studio between 1934 and 1959.

== Plot ==
The Stooges are Click, Clack and Cluck, paparazzi-like photographers employed by Whack Magazine, a publication renowned for its sensationalist approach to imagery. After the trio fails in their assignd mission to capture a photograph of movie star Percival De Puyster and his newlywed spouse, their employer, Mr. Wilson, dismisses them from their positions. However, Wilson subsequently dispatches the trio to Vulgaria (a fictionalized representation of a totalitarian regime reminiscent of fascist Bulgaria) for their next assignment, fully aware that photography in Vulgaria is deemed an act of espionage punishable by death.

Upon their arrival in Vulgaria, the bumbling trio attempt to photograph a group of soldiers who are escorting another photographer to his place of execution. The Stooges are seized by the Vulgarian authorities and incarcerated in a Vulgarian prison. As they face imminent execution by firing squad, Curly requests a final smoke, and unveils an improbably lengthy cigar. The executioners fall asleep during the resulting delay, and when they waken the trio evade the firing squad's bullets by concealing their heads within their shirts.

Subsequent scenes depict the Stooges entering an official headquarters where they find Vulgaria's new ray gun, mistakenly identified by the trio as a camera. When they activate the device, the resulting chaos betrays their presence and they scramble to evade detection by the returning Vulgarian officers. Curly takes refuge inside a malfunctioning radio, where he impersonates a broadcast by engaging in a cacophonous performance using unconventional musical instruments.

After getting the better of the officers, the Stooges appropriate their uniforms and enter a nearby cafe for lunch. Within this setting, Curly engages in battle against a live oyster hiding within his bowl of stew. Despite their efforts to sustain their masquerade, the Stooges are ultimately apprehended by the guards. They are physically transported away, suspended from the bayonets of their captors' rifles.

== Cast ==
=== Credited ===
- Moe Howard as Moe Click
- Larry Fine as Larry Clack
- Curly Howard as Curly Cluck

=== Uncredited ===
- Vernon Dent as Mr. Wilson
- Edmund Cobb as Wilson's Assistant
- Neal Burns as Photographer in Hallway
- Stanley Brown as Percival DePuyster
- Marjorie Deanne as Mrs. DePuyster
- George Gray as Frightened man in Hallway
- Blanca Vischer as Wilson's Secretary
- Harry Semels as Villager
- Bud Jamison as Vulgarian Sergeant
- George Ovey as Civilian Photographer
- Fred Aldrich as Firing Squad Soldier
- Fred Kelsey as Vulgarian Colonel
- Eddie Laughton as Ray Machine Operator
- Bruce Bennett as Vulgarian Soldier in Colonel's Office
- Bert Young as Vulgarian Sentry
- Kit Guard as Vulgarian Sentry
- Chester Conklin as Counterman
- Al Thompson as Vulgarian soldier in Restaurant
- Charlie Phillips as Vulgarian soldier in Restaurant
- Joe Palma as Vulgarian soldier in Restaurant

== Production notes ==
Dutiful But Dumb was filmed on August 1–5, 1940; the film title is a play on "beautiful but dumb."

An adaptation of the oyster soup battle is featured in The Three Stooges video game, where players control Curly, who attempts to pick up and eat as many crackers from the oyster soup as possible before the oysters do. Oysters occasionally fire soup at Curly. The gag was later performed by Moe in 1948's Shivering Sherlocks, and Larry, who fights the Lobster Gumbo in 1954's Income Tax Sappy. The gag also appears in the 1945 Abbott and Costello film, Here Come the Co-Eds.
