= The Blind Woman of Sorrento (novel) =

1852 novel by Francesco Mastriani

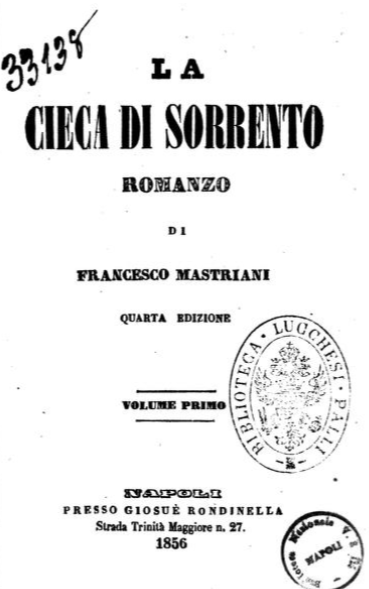
- Title page for La cieca di Sorrento (1856)
- Author: Francesco Mastriani
- Language: Italian
- Publication date: 1852
- Media type: Print

The Blind Woman of Sorrento (Italian: La cieca di Sorrento) is a novel by the Italian writer Francesco Mastriani which was first published in 1852.

The novel has been adapted into other media several times including:

- The Blind Woman of Sorrento (1916 film), a silent Italian film directed by Gustavo Serena
- The Blind Woman of Sorrento (1934 film), an Italian film directed by Nunzio Malasomma
- The Blind Woman of Sorrento (1952 film), an Italian film directed by Giacomo Gentilomo

== Bibliography ==
- Cicioni, Mirna & Di Ciolla, Nicoletta. Differences, Deceits and Desires: Murder and Mayhem in Italian Crime Fiction. Associated University Presse, 2008.
