= Sammy Stein =

American football player, actor, and wrestler (1905–1966)

Profile
- Positions: End, tackle

Personal information
- Born: April 1, 1905; New York City, New York, U.S.
- Died: March 30, 1966 (aged 60); Las Vegas, Nevada, U.S.
- Listed height: 6 ft 0 in (1.83 m)
- Listed weight: 195 lb (88 kg)

Career history
- Staten Island Stapletons (1929-1930); New York Giants (1931); Brooklyn Dodgers (1932)
- Stats at Pro Football Reference

Samuel Stein (April 1, 1905 – March 30, 1966) was an American football player, actor, and professional wrestler. He played four seasons in the National Football League (NFL) as an end and tackle for the Staten Island Stapletons (1929–1930), New York Giants (1931), and Brooklyn Dodgers (1932). He appeared in 31 NFL games, 21 as a starter.

== Selected filmography ==
- The Life of Jimmy Dolan (1933) - King Cobra (uncredited)
- The Lost Patrol (1934) - Abelson
- Goin' to Town (1935) - Cowboy (uncredited)
- Love Me Forever (1935) - Joe, Casino Floorman (uncredited)
- Modern Times (1936) - Turbine Operator
- The Saint's Double Trouble (1940) - Policeman (uncredited)
- The Saint Takes Over (1940) - Hood (uncredited)
- Millionaires in Prison (1940) - Mess Hall Guard (uncredited)
- One Crowded Night (1940) - Mike, Bus Driver (uncredited)
- Prairie Schooners (1940) - Dude Geeter (uncredited)
- The Long Voyage Home (1940) - Seaman (uncredited)
- Mexican Spitfire (1940) - Cowboy (uncredited)
- The Wildcat of Tucson (1940) - Gus Logan - Henchman
- Murder Among Friends (1941) - Policeman (uncredited)
- Footlight Fever (1941) - Mike - First Robber (uncredited)
- Sailors on Leave (1941) - Sailor (uncredited)
- Public Enemies (1941) - Jake
- Sierra Sue (1941) - Irate Cowboy at Human Cannonball show (uncredited)
- Sing Your Worries Away (1942) - Henchman (uncredited)
- Broadway (1942) - Slug (uncredited)
- Remember Pearl Harbor (1942) - MP Sgt. Adams
- Syncopation (1942) - Gangster (uncredited)
- My Favorite Spy (1942) - Marine Socking Kay (uncredited)
- Powder Town (1942) - Battman, a Henchman (uncredited)
- The Big Street (1942) - Mug at Mindy's (uncredited)
- Road to Morocco (1942) - Guard (uncredited)
- Gentleman Jim (1942) - Joe Choynski (uncredited)
- Pittsburgh (1942) - Killer Kane (uncredited)
- No Time for Love (1943) - Sandhog (uncredited)
- It Ain't Hay (1943) - Bouncer (uncredited)
- Sleepy Lagoon (1943) - Lug (uncredited)
- Crazy House (1943) - Dead End Character (uncredited)
- Swing Fever (1943) - Wrestler (uncredited)
- Never a Dull Moment (1943) - Romeo
- Ghost Catchers (1944) - Mug (uncredited)
- Marine Raiders (1944) - Sergeant (uncredited)
- Kismet (1944) - Policeman (uncredited)
- Frenchman's Creek (1944) - Pirate Crewman (uncredited)
- Lost in a Harem (1944) - Native Jailor (uncredited)
- The Princess and the Pirate (1944) - Blackjack Thug (uncredited)
- The Big Show-Off (1945) - Boris the Bulgar
- Here Come the Co-eds (1945) - Tiger McGurk aka The Masked Marvel (uncredited)
- Bring on the Girls (1945) - Shore Patrol Guard (uncredited)
- The Great John L. (1945) - Fight Spectator (uncredited)
- Road to Utopia (1945) - Husky Sailor (uncredited)
- They Were Expendable (1945) - Sammy - Boat Crewman (uncredited)
- The French Key (1946) - Percy
- The Dark Horse (1946) - 1st Ambulance Attendant (uncredited)
- Death Valley (1946) - Bartender (uncredited)
- Shoot to Kill (1947) - Blackie
- Riffraff (1947) - Henchman (uncredited)
- The Crimson Key (1947) - Roger - Gunman (uncredited)
- Variety Girl (1947) - Masseur (uncredited)
- If You Knew Susie (1948) - Wee Willie (uncredited)
- Mighty Joe Young (1949) - Strongman (uncredited)
- The Veils of Bagdad (1953) - Abdallah
- The Body Is a Shell (1957) - (final film role)

== See also ==
- List of gridiron football players who became professional wrestlers
