= Francesco Mastriani =

Italian novelist (1819–1891)

- Born: 23 November 1819; Naples, Kingdom of the Two Sicilies
- Died: 7 January 1891 (aged 71); Naples, Italy
- Occupation: Writer

Francesco Mastriani (1819–1891) was an Italian novelist. Mastriani wrote in a variety of genres. One of his most successful was The Blind Woman of Sorrento (1852). In the twentieth century a number of his novels were turned into films.

== Bibliography ==
- Mayer, Geoff. Historical Dictionary of Crime Films. Scarecrow Press, 2012. google books
