= Knutzy Knights =

1954 American short film by Jules White

- Directed by: Jules White; Edward Bernds (stock footage)
- Written by: Felix Adler; Edward Bernds (stock footage)
- Produced by: Jules White
- Starring: Moe Howard; Larry Fine; Shemp Howard; Christine McIntyre; Ruth Godfrey; Vernon Dent; Philip Van Zandt; Jock Mahoney; Joe Palma
- Cinematography: Ray Cory
- Edited by: Edwin H. Bryant
- Distributed by: Columbia Pictures
- Release date: September 2, 1954 (U.S.)
- Running time: 15:22
- Country: United States
- Language: English

Knutzy Knights is a 1954 short subject directed by Jules White starring American slapstick comedy team The Three Stooges (Moe Howard, Larry Fine and Shemp Howard). It is the 156th entry in the series released by Columbia Pictures starring the comedians, who released 190 shorts for the studio between 1934 and 1959.

== Plot ==
The Stooges, acting as troubadours, are dispatched to ameliorate the despondency of Princess Elaine, who finds herself disconsolate due to her imminent betrothal to the Black Prince, a suitor chosen for her in an arranged marriage by her father, the King. However, Princess Elaine's affections are firmly directed towards Cedric, the local blacksmith.

The Stooges endeavor to intercede on behalf of Cedric by engaging in a musical intervention, serenading Princess Elaine with a rendition reminiscent of the Sextette from Lucia di Lammermoor. Their lyrical rendition subtly conveys Cedric's presence and issues a cautionary note regarding the nefarious designs of the Black Prince. Subsequently, Cedric is apprehended by the king's guards and sentenced to capital punishment by beheading.

In due course, the King becomes cognizant of the sinister machinations of the Black Prince and his co-conspirators, leading to their incarceration. With this revelation, Princess Elaine is granted the liberty to espouse Cedric, culminating in a denouement characterized by harmonious resolution and felicity for all involved parties.

== Cast ==
=== Credited ===
- Moe Howard as Moe
- Larry Fine as Larry
- Shemp Howard as Shemp
- Jock Mahoney as Cedric the Blacksmith
- Christine McIntyre as Princess Elaine
- Philip Van Zandt as Black Prince

=== Uncredited ===
- Vernon Dent as King Arthur
- Ruth Godfrey as Lady in waiting
- Harold Brauer as Sir Satchel (stock footage)
  - Joe Palma as Sir Satchel (new footage)
- Robert Stevens as Guard in blacksmith shop, Guard giving chase in castle hallways (new footage)
- Joe Palma as Guard in blacksmith shop, Guard giving chase in castle hallways (new footage)
- Bill Clark as guard in courtyard
- Kenner G. Kemp as guard in courtyard
- Douglas Coppin as King Arthur's personal guard
- Judy Malcolm as Woman in king's entourage

== Production notes ==
Knutzy Knights is a remake of Squareheads of the Round Table (1948), using ample stock footage; new scenes were filmed on January 18–19, 1954.

Knutzy Knights is notable for being the last film featuring new footage of longtime Stooge foil Vernon Dent. Dent was aged 58 at the time of filming and losing his eyesight from the effects of Type 2 diabetes. (He would be completely blind by the time of Shemp Howard's death in November 1955.) Dent appeared in six more Stooge films after Knutzy Knights, via recycled footage: Of Cash and Hash, Bedlam in Paradise (both 1955), Flagpole Jitters, Rumpus in the Harem, Hot Stuff (all 1956), and Guns a Poppin (1957).
