= Fake Shemp =

Someone who appears in a film as a replacement for another person

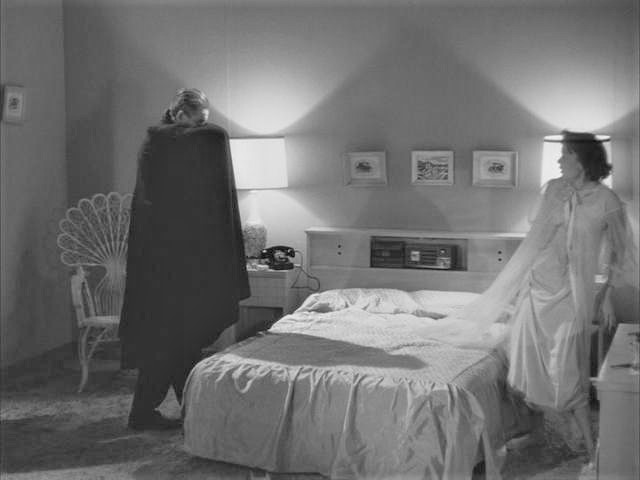
Tom Mason (left) standing in for deceased actor Bela Lugosi in the 1957 horror film Plan 9 from Outer Space

A fake Shemp is a type of body double who appears in a film to replace another actor or person, usually when the original actor has died or is otherwise unable or unwilling to reprise their role. Their appearance is disguised using methods such as heavy make-up (or a computer-generated equivalent), filming from the back, dubbing in audio and splicing in past footage from the original actor's previous work, using a sound-alike voice actor, or using partial shots of the actor.

Coined by film director Sam Raimi, the term is named after Shemp Howard of The Three Stooges, whose sudden death in 1955 necessitated the use of these techniques to finish the films to which he was already committed. Although using fake Shemps was somewhat common throughout the 20th century, contracts with the Screen Actors Guild ban reproducing an actor's likeness, unless the original actor has given permission to do so. The method continues to be used in cases where the original actor is deceased and permission from the deceased actor's estate is granted.

== Origin ==
The term refers to the comedy trio The Three Stooges. On November 22, 1955, Stooge Shemp Howard died of a heart attack at age 60. At the time, the Stooges still had four shorts left to deliver (Rumpus in the Harem, Hot Stuff, Scheming Schemers, and Commotion on the Ocean) under their annual contract with Columbia Pictures. By this point in the trio's career, budget cuts at Columbia had forced them to rely on stock footage from completed shorts, so they could finish the films without Shemp. New footage was filmed of the other two Stooges (Moe Howard and Larry Fine) and edited with stock footage. When continuity required that Shemp appear in the new scenes, director Jules White used Joe Palma, one of Columbia's bit character actors, as a body double for him. Palma often appeared only from behind or with an object obscuring his face. Palma had appeared as a supporting character in numerous Three Stooges shorts before Shemp's death and continued in that capacity for the trio's shorts with Joe Besser as the third Stooge. These four shorts are the only documented times he performed as Shemp's stand-in; Shemp's usual stunt double was Harold Breen, but these four shorts required someone to double as Shemp in an actor's capacity. While Palma was the inspiration for the term "fake Shemp", the phrase was not used at the time.

The practice predated its use for Shemp by several decades; it had mainly been used to replace actors who died or fell ill during production. Early examples included Shadows of Suspicion in 1919, after Harold Lockwood died of the Spanish flu; Saratoga in 1937 (after Jean Harlow died, having completed most of her scenes and fans lobbied to have the film released); and Return of the Ape Man in 1944, where the illness of George Zucco led to heavyweight boxer Frank Moran's stepping into the role Zucco originated midway through the film.

== First use of the term ==
Aspiring filmmaker Sam Raimi, a professed Stooges fan, coined the term in his first feature-length movie The Evil Dead. Most of his cast and crew abandoned the project after major delays (mostly due to budget issues) pushed production well beyond the scheduled six weeks. He was forced to use himself, his longtime friends Bruce Campbell, Rob Tapert, and Josh Becker, his assistant David Goodman, and his brother Ted Raimi as "fake Shemps". Sam Raimi's later productions in film and television have also often used the term to refer to stand-ins or nameless characters. For example, 16 fake Shemps were included in the credits for Army of Darkness, Raimi's second sequel to The Evil Dead.

== Other examples ==
There have been many fake Shemps over the years. Actor Roy Kinnear died accidentally while filming The Return of the Musketeers: his role was completed by using a body double filmed from the rear and a voice artist. The death of actor John Candy forced the use of a fake Shemp to complete filming of Wagons East!. Nancy Marchand died before the filming of the third season of The Sopranos, necessitating fake Shemp techniques such as reusing old footage and digitally superimposing Marchand's face onto the body of a stand-in to allow her character Livia Soprano to appear one final time before the character's death in "Proshai, Livushka", costing approximately $250,000.

For the 1989 film Back to the Future Part II, actor Crispin Glover was asked to reprise the role of George McFly. Glover was initially interested, but did not sign on board with the movie because, according to Glover, his salary was significantly less than his co-stars. Therefore, for the George McFly character to appear in the movie, the director, Robert Zemeckis, used previously filmed footage of Glover from the first film and inter-spliced Jeffrey Weissman. Weissman also wore prosthetics, including a false chin, nose, and cheekbones and used various obfuscating methods, such as background, sunglasses, rear shot, and even upside-down, to resemble Glover. Glover sued the producers, including Steven Spielberg, on the grounds that they neither owned his likeness nor had permission to use it. Due to the lawsuit, Screen Actors Guild collective bargaining agreements now include clauses stating that producers and actors cannot use such methods to reproduce the likeness of other actors.

== Digital technology ==
In 1994, Brandon Lee died from a prop gun accident while filming The Crow. Since he had only 3 days of filming left, his scenes were completed with body doubles and one of the earliest digital face replacement in a film, inserting his face onto the double. In 1999, during the filming of Gladiator, Oliver Reed died before filming all his scenes. As a result, a fake Shemp replaced him, and the ending was changed. In 2013, Paul Walker died from a car crash before completing the filming for Furious 7. Subsequently, the story arc for Walker's character Brian O'Conner was rewritten to allow for his retirement from the series. To achieve this, co-star John Brotherton and Walker's brothers Caleb and Cody were used as Shemps, with computer-generated facial replacement used to recreate his likeness when necessary.

Carrie Fisher died in 2016 before she could film any of her scenes for Star Wars: The Rise of Skywalker. Footage of Fisher shot for The Force Awakens was used in the film by superimposing her head onto a digital body. In the 2016 Star Wars prequel film Rogue One, the face of Peter Cushing (who died in 1994) was digitally applied to actor Guy Henry. Cushing's colleague and friend Kevin Francis filed a legal challenge against Disney in 2024, claiming that Cushing had never given any permission for his likeness to be used in this way.

== See also ==
- Alan Smithee
- De-aging in film and television#Virtual actors in motion pictures
