= Dopey Dicks =

1950 film by Edward Bernds

- Directed by: Edward Bernds
- Written by: Elwood Ullman
- Produced by: Hugh McCollum
- Starring: Moe Howard; Larry Fine; Shemp Howard; Christine McIntyre; Philip Van Zandt; Stanley Price
- Cinematography: Vincent J. Farrar
- Edited by: Henry DeMond
- Distributed by: Columbia Pictures
- Release date: March 2, 1950 (U.S.)
- Running time: 15:57
- Country: United States
- Language: English

Dopey Dicks is a 1950 detective film short subject directed by Edward Bernds starring American slapstick comedy team The Three Stooges (Moe Howard, Larry Fine and Shemp Howard). It is the 122nd entry in the series released by Columbia Pictures starring the comedians, who released 190 shorts for the studio between 1934 and 1959.

In the film, a young woman enters a private investigator's office and asks for help. The investigator is absent, but the office's janitors agree to help her. The woman is kidnapped shortly after. The janitors attempt to rescue the damsel in distress, but they have to face a mad scientist and his army of robots.

The film parodies the Sam Spade stories by Dashiell Hammett. The unseen detective whom the Stooges effectively replace is called "Sam Shovel".

== Plot ==
The Stooges, employed as janitors, have just completed the task of relocating furniture and assorted items into the office of a detective. Amidst this mundane routine, Shemp indulges in a daydream about the adventurous life of a private investigator. Suddenly, a distressed young woman bursts into the scene, imploring their aid, alleging that she is being pursued. While the Stooges embark on a search through the hallways, the woman hastily scribbles a note before being seized by an unidentified assailant.

Following the clues provided in her note, the Stooges venture to a foreboding residence situated on Mortuary Road, where they stumble upon the sinister machinations of an evil scientist, who is in the process of constructing an army of robotic beings. In their quest to rescue the damsel in distress, Shemp discovers her restrained and silenced within a concealed alcove at the culmination of the main corridor.

Subsequently, the scientist and his accomplice endeavor to eliminate the Stooges, yet the trio manages to outmaneuver their adversaries, effecting their escape alongside the rescued woman in a vehicle commandeered from one of the scientist's headless automatons.

== Cast ==
=== Credited ===
- Moe Howard as Moe
- Larry Fine as Larry
- Shemp Howard as Shemp
- Christine McIntyre as Louise
- Philip Van Zandt as Professor Potter
- Stanley Price as Ralph

=== Uncredited ===
- William Kelley as Headless Robot

== Production notes ==
Dopey Dicks was filmed on January 11–14, 1949, and released nearly 14 months later on March 2, 1950.

The film's title is a spoof of Herman Melville's 1851 novel Moby-Dick. The unseen private eye is named Sam Shovel, a play on Dashiell Hammett's famed detective Sam Spade.

A colorized version of Dopey Dicks was released in 2007 as part of the DVD collection Hapless Half-Wits.

== In popular culture ==
Dopey Dicks was one of four Stooge films included in the TBS 1992 Halloween special Three Stooges Fright Night. This short was replaced by Malice in the Palace in its 1995 airing.
