= Oh, My Nerves =

1935 film

- Directed by: Del Lord
- Written by: Jack White
- Produced by: Jules White
- Starring: Monte Collins; Tom Kennedy
- Cinematography: Dave Ragin
- Edited by: Charles Hochberg
- Distributed by: Columbia Pictures
- Release date: October 17, 1935
- Running time: 18 minutes
- Country: United States
- Language: English

Oh, My Nerves is a 1935 American short comedy film directed by Del Lord. It was nominated for an Academy Award at the 8th Academy Awards, held in March 1936, for Best Short Subject (Comedy). The Academy Film Archive preserved Oh, My Nerves in 2012.

== Cast ==
- Monte Collins as Monty (as Monty Collins)
- Tom Kennedy as Tom
- Ruth Hiatt
- Elaine Waters
- Tommy Bond
- Charles Dorety
- Valerie Hall
- James C. Morton
- Richard Allen
- Lew Davis
- June Gittelson
- Jay Healey
- Sam Lufkin
- Al Thompson

== Remakes ==
Oh, My Nerves was remade with The Three Stooges as Idiots Deluxe and Guns a Poppin.
