= Squareheads of the Round Table =

1948 American short film by Edward Bernds

- Directed by: Edward Bernds
- Written by: Edward Bernds
- Produced by: Hugh McCollum
- Starring: Moe Howard; Larry Fine; Shemp Howard; Christine McIntyre; Vernon Dent; Philip Van Zandt; Jock Mahoney; Harold Brauer
- Cinematography: Allen G. Siegler
- Edited by: Henry DeMond
- Production company: Columbia Pictures
- Distributed by: Columbia Pictures
- Release date: March 4, 1948
- Running time: 18:17
- Country: United States
- Language: English

Squareheads of the Round Table is a 1948 short subject directed by Edward Bernds starring American slapstick comedy team The Three Stooges (Moe Howard, Larry Fine and Shemp Howard). It is the 106th entry in the series released by Columbia Pictures starring the comedians, who released 190 shorts for the studio between 1934 and 1959.

== Plot ==
The Stooges are troubadours during the Middle Ages amidst the era of King Arthur Pendragon's reign. The narrative unfolds wherein nefarious Black Prince harbors aspirations of union with Princess Elaine. However, the princess's affections lie with Cedric, the humble blacksmith. The intervention of the Stooges is pivotal, as they endeavor to advocate for Cedric's cause through the medium of music, specifically performing the sextet excerpted from Gaetano Donizetti's opera Lucia di Lammermoor.

Following a daring escape from confinement within the dungeon, where the King has sentenced them to face decapitation, Moe overhears a clandestine dialogue between the Black Prince and an accomplice. This exchange reveals a treacherous plot to assassinate the King subsequent to his nuptials with Princess Elaine, with the ulterior motive of securing the throne for the Black Prince. Through a display of diversionary antics, the trio engages in an armored dance choreographed to the strains of Stephen Foster's composition "Old Folks at Home", successfully disrupt the unfolding scheme, thereby affording Elaine the opportunity to liberate Cedric from captivity. The King ultimately apprehends the Black Prince and his confederate, thereby thwarting their machinations. Princess Elaine is consequently granted permission to unite in matrimony with Cedric.

== Cast ==
=== Credited ===
- Shemp Howard as Shemp
- Larry Fine as Larry
- Moe Howard as Moe
- Christine McIntyre as Princess Elaine
- Jock Mahoney as Cedric the Blacksmith
- Philip Van Zandt as Black Prince
- Vernon Dent as King Arthur

=== Uncredited ===
- Harold Brauer as Sir Satchel
- Joe Palma as Guard
- Robert Stevens as Guard
- Joe Garcio as Headsman
- Douglas Coppin as King's Personal Guard
- Judy Malcolm as Woman in King's Entourage

== Production notes ==
Squareheads of the Round Table was the ninth Stooge film released but the third one filmed after Shemp rejoined the comedy team. Filming occurred on December 9–12, 1946, but was withheld from release until March 1948, approximately 15 months later. It was filmed approximately five months after the last entry, Out West (1947), was filmed.

Squareheads of the Round Table was remade in 1954 as Knutzy Knights, using ample stock footage. Like Fiddlers Three and The Hot Scots, Squareheads of the Round Table was filmed on the existing set of the feature film The Bandit of Sherwood Forest.

== Quotes ==
- King Arthur: "My daughter marry a ‘smith?!"
- Shemp: "Take it easy, King; millions of women marry Smiths every year!"
