= Fiddlers Three (1948 film) =

1948 film by Jules White

- Directed by: Jules White
- Written by: Felix Adler
- Produced by: Jules White
- Starring: Moe Howard; Larry Fine; Shemp Howard; Vernon Dent; Virginia Hunter; Philip Van Zandt; Cy Schindell; Al Thompson; Joe Palma
- Cinematography: Allen G. Siegler
- Edited by: Edwin H. Bryant
- Distributed by: Columbia Pictures
- Release date: May 6, 1948 (U.S.)
- Running time: 17:20
- Country: United States
- Language: English

Fiddlers Three is a 1948 short subject directed by Jules White starring American slapstick comedy team The Three Stooges (Moe Howard, Larry Fine and Shemp Howard). It is the 107th entry in the series released by Columbia Pictures starring the comedians, who released 190 shorts for the studio between 1934 and 1959.

The film depicts a trio of fiddlers as court musicians in the court of the Old King Cole, traditionally identified with the 4th-century Romano-British leader Coel Hen. They are asked to perform in the springtime nuptials of Princess Alicia, but Alicia is kidnapped by an evil magician. The musicians confront the kidnapper in a swordfight, partially to ensure their own freedom.

== Plot ==
In Coleslaw-vania, the Stooges serve as fiddlers at the court of the Old King Cole who are subject to a decree from the monarch that prohibits their marital unions until the forthcoming nuptials between Princess Alicia and Prince Gallant III of Rhododendron, scheduled to coincide with the springtime bloom of flowers. The malicious designs of the malevolent magician Murgatroyd disrupt this arrangement as he orchestrates the abduction of Princess Alicia for his own matrimonial aspirations.

Amidst their endeavors to attend to their equine companions by fitting them with new horseshoes, the Stooges inadvertently stumble upon the captive Princess Alicia, tied up and gagged within the confines of the castle floor. In a parallel stratagem, Murgatroyd secures the consent of King Cole to his matrimonial intentions under the condition that he successfully retrieves the abducted princess. Employing subterfuge, Moe and Larry manipulate the castle guards, causing a diversion that facilitates Shemp's liberation of the princess.

Their triumph is ephemeral, however, as the Stooges, along with Princess Alicia, are soon ensnared by the machinations of Murgatroyd and his accomplices. In a bid for freedom, the Stooges ascend a rope ladder concealed within a magic box, inadvertently enduring the maleficent implements wielded by Murgatroyd in his attempt to thwart their escape. The box ultimately succumbs to the strain, precipitating the Stooges' descent just as Princess Alicia arrives to reveal her abductor's identity.

A conflict then arises, characterized by swordsmanship, as the Stooges engage in a confrontation with Murgatroyd. Their endeavors encounter a momentary hindrance with the passing of Murgatroyd's assistant. Subsequently, a procession unfolds under the guidance of the assistant, comprising Murgatroyd, King Cole, and the Stooges, with the exception of Shemp, who, fatigued and parched, seeks respite. As Shemp alleviates his thirst with a vessel of water, it disperses from the numerous perforations in his anatomy — a direct consequence of his participation in Murgatroyd's malevolent enchantment during the performance of the Sword Box Illusion prestidigitation.

== Production notes ==
Fiddlers Three was filmed on May 26–29, 1947. Like Squareheads of the Round Table and The Hot Scots, it was filmed on the existing set of the feature film The Bandit of Sherwood Forest.

This is the 13th of 16 Stooge shorts with the word "three" in the title.

Fiddlers Three was remade in 1954 as Musty Musketeers, using ample stock footage.

== Cast ==
- Moe Howard as Moe
- Larry Fine as Larry
- Shemp Howard as Shemp
- Vernon Dent as Old King Cole
- Virginia Hunter as Princess Alisha
- Philip Van Zandt as Mergatroyd the Magician
- Sherry O'Neil as The Girl in the Box
- Joe Palma as Lancier, the Captain of the Guard
- Cy Schindell as a Guard
- Al Thompson as the King's Attendant
