= The Knife of the Party =

- Directed by: Leigh Jason
- Written by: Art Jarrett, Sr. H.O. Kusell
- Produced by: Amadee J. Van Beuren; Monroe Shaff; Meyer Davis
- Starring: Lillian Miles; Jack Good; Shemp Howard; James Fox; Charles Senna; The Girl Friends; Gertrude Mudge; Leo Kennedy; Rogers & Anthony
- Cinematography: Joseph Ruttenberg
- Music by: Harold Spina; Johnny Burke
- Distributed by: RKO Pictures
- Release date: February 16, 1934
- Running time: 20 minutes
- Country: United States
- Language: English

The Knife of the Party is a black-and-white short film starring Shemp Howard. The comedy was filmed at Van Beuren Studios and released by RKO Radio Pictures on February 16, 1934.

== Shemp Howard and His Stooges ==
Shemp Howard makes an odd appearance as the lead stooge of four smack-around stooges. This act was presumably either a casting decision by the filmmakers or a short-lived act put together by Shemp. Shemp had been the original second stooge with Moe Howard as first and Kenneth Lackey (later replaced by Larry Fine) as the original third stooge. Three Stooges Shemp later left the act to be replaced by his brother Curly Howard, then returned after Curly retired in the wake of a series of strokes.

This feature appears on the Three Stooges DVD The Three Stooges: Greatest Hits and Rarities.

== Cast ==
- Lillian Miles - Donna
- Jack Good - Walter Brown
- Shemp Howard and his Stooges
  - James Fox - Stooge
  - Charles Senna - Stooge
- The Girl Friends - Singing Trio
- Gertrude Mudge - Mrs. Dora
- Leo Kennedy - bit role
- Rogers & Anthony - bit roles
- Bill Lawley - bit role
- Eddie Roberts - bit role
- Sybil Byrne - bit role

== Music ==
The songs, by Harold Spina (music) and Johnny Burke (lyrics), include "Whistle While You Work" (not to be confused with the song made famous three years later in Walt Disney's animated film Snow White and the Seven Dwarfs).
