= Vernon Dent =

American actor and comedian (1895–1963)

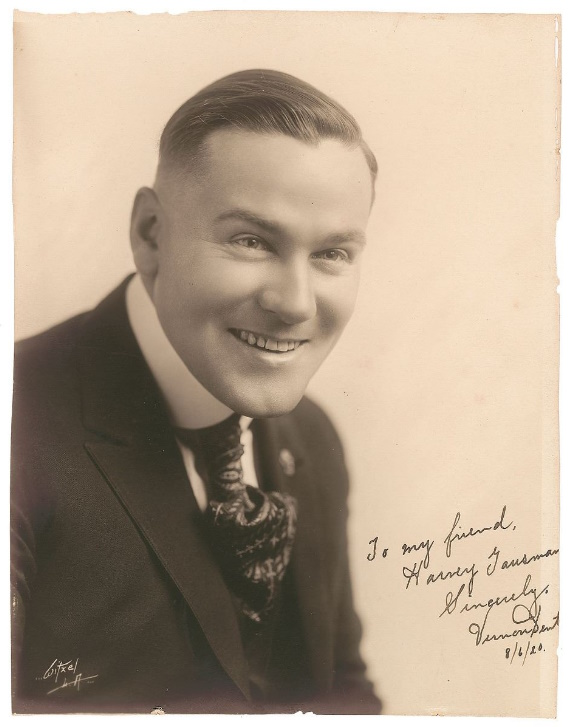
- Dent c. 1920
- Born: Vernon Bruce Dent; February 16, 1895; San Jose, California, U.S.
- Died: November 5, 1963 (aged 68); Hollywood, California, U.S.
- Resting place: Forest Lawn Memorial Park, Hollywood Hills, California
- Occupation: Actor
- Years active: 1919–1954
- Spouse: Eunice Muncy (m. 1938)

Vernon Bruce Dent (February 16, 1895 – November 5, 1963) was an American comic actor, who appeared in over 400 films. He co-starred in many short films for Columbia Pictures, frequently as the foil, main antagonist, and an ally to The Three Stooges.

== Early career ==
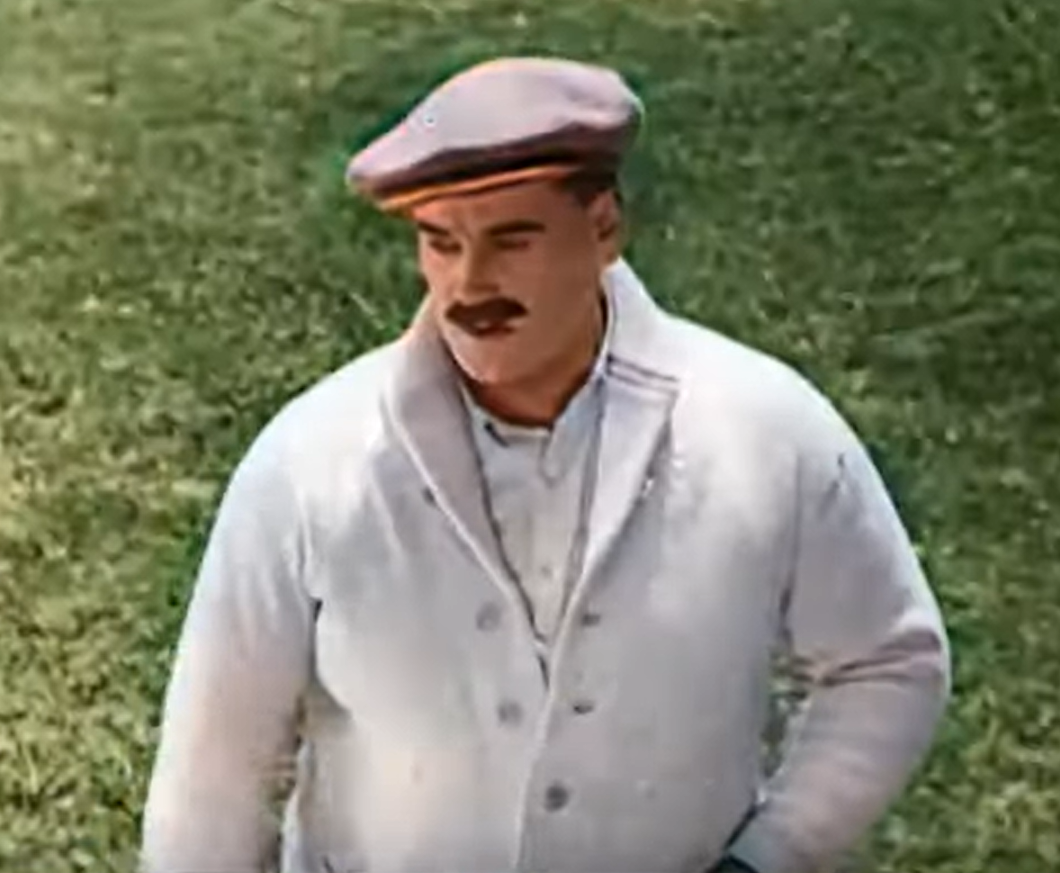
Dent in Feet of Mud (1924)

In the early 1920s, Dent was a fixture at the Mack Sennett studio, working with comedians Billy Bevan, Andy Clyde, and especially Harry Langdon. Dent alternately played breezy pals and blustery authority figures opposite Langdon's timid character.

Sennett voided all contracts when it came time to retool his studio for sound, and Dent moved to Educational Pictures in 1929. Dent's supporting performances were frequently funnier than the sometimes uninspired antics of the nominal stars. When Educational hired Harry Langdon for a series of two-reelers in 1932, Vernon Dent resumed his place as Langdon's co-star.

== Columbia Pictures ==
Dent joined Columbia Pictures' short-subject department in 1935, and achieved his greatest success there. He went on to work with practically every star on the payroll, including Andy Clyde, Charley Chase, and Eddie Quillan (all fellow Mack Sennett alumni), as well as Buster Keaton, El Brendel, Vera Vague, Hugh Herbert, Gus Schilling and Richard Lane, Harry von Zell, and Bert Wheeler. Dent appeared very occasionally in feature films, including Million Dollar Legs, Chip Off the Old Block, The Harvey Girls, Rockin' in the Rockies, and Kill the Umpire. In feature films he sometimes played character roles with a German dialect, which served him well during World War II with war-themed films in production.

Dent was most often featured in the Three Stooges comedies, and made more appearances in their films than any other supporting actor (96). Dent also appeared with The Three Stooges on a live CBS Television broadcast of The Frank Sinatra Show on January 1, 1952. Through his association with the Stooges, Dent became a close friend of Shemp Howard.

== Illness and death ==
Away from motion pictures, in the late 1930s and early 1940s, Dent owned and operated a soda fountain and refreshments concession at Westlake Park in Los Angeles. Mrs. Dent recalled:

It wasn't our livelihood so we didn't depend upon it. He did this as a lark. We had jukeboxes and ice cream. It was very lucrative and a lot of fun. Vernon loved that. He drank far too much Coca-Cola. When we had the concession he'd drink the syrup and add his own seltzer.

This ultimately resulted in a diagnosis of diabetes later in life, and Dent eventually lost his vision. Even this affliction didn't stop his career; producer-director Jules White, filming low-budget remakes of earlier comedies, hired Vernon Dent for a few new scenes to match his older ones. Dent, now legally blind, delivered enthusiastic performances while in static or seated positions accommodating his impaired vision. He retired from performing in 1954 but he continued to appear in previously-filmed footage from his earlier shorts; as such, his last "appearance" was in the Stooge short Guns a Poppin (1957). Dent had appeared in over 400 films by the time of his retirement.

Dent attended Shemp Howard's funeral in 1955. By that time, he was completely blind and had to be led to Shemp's casket. Character actor and longtime Stooge collaborator Emil Sitka was one of many at the event who did not know Dent had lost his sight:

Vernon came into the parlor, wearing a yarmulke like everyone else since this was a Jewish ceremony. He was led in by his arm, and brought up to Shemp's casket. The man accompanying Vernon told him, "This is Shemp." Vernon was staring straight ahead at the wall – it was then that I realized he was blind. Vernon felt Shemp's hand, then his face very gently. Everyone else had been filing past the casket quickly, but Vernon took his time, giving a last goodbye to his friend. It was one of the most moving things I ever saw.

Dent's diabetes worsened after his retirement, limiting his activities. He died of a heart attack on November 5, 1963; he is buried at Forest Lawn Memorial Park, in Hillside plot, grave L-3796.

== Selected filmography ==
- An Auto Nut (1919, Short) as The Lawyer's Clerk, alias The Doctor (uncredited)
- Hail the Woman (1921) as Joe Hurd
- The Shriek of Araby (1923) - minor role (uncredited)
- Soul of the Beast (1923) as The Boob
- The Extra Girl (1923) as Aaron Applejohn
- Picking Peaches (1924) as Store Manager
- The Hollywood Kid (1924) as Claude Climax - Director
- Feet of Mud (1924) as the Football Coach
- Flirty Four-Flushers (1926, Short) - Bill Brown
- His First Flame (1927) - Amos McCarthy
- The Girl from Everywhere (1927) - minor role (uncredited)
- Golf Widows (1928) as Ernest Ward
- The Cameraman (1928) as Man in Tight Bathing Suit (uncredited)
- Midnight Daddies (1930) as Baron von Twiddlebaum - Designer
- Crazy House (1930 film)
- Murder at Midnight (1931) as Detective Eating Peanuts (uncredited)
- Dragnet Patrol (1931) as Cookie
- Dream House (1932, Short) as Director Von Schnauble
- Texas Cyclone (1932) as Hefty - the Bartender
- Business and Pleasure (1932) - Charles Turner (uncredited)
- Passport to Paradise (1932)
- The Riding Tornado (1932) - Hefty - Bartender
- Daring Danger (1932) - Bartender Pee Wee
- Million Dollar Legs (1932) as Secretary of Agriculture (uncredited)
- Please (1933, Short) as Elmer Smoot
- Just an Echo (1934, Short)
- You're Telling Me! (1934) as Fat Man in Compartment (uncredited)
- Manhattan Melodrama (1934) as Otto - German Dancer on Steamship (uncredited)
- Good Morning, Eve! (1934, early Technicolor Short) as Emperor Nero
- The Painted Veil (1934) as Chief of Police (scenes deleted)
- Half Shot Shooters (1936, Short) as Man in Restaurant
- San Francisco (1936) as Fat Man (uncredited)
- Slippery Silks (1936, Short) as Mr. Morgan (uncredited)
- Dizzy Doctors (1937, Short) as Dr. Harry Arms (uncredited)
- Back to the Woods (1937, Short) as Governor (uncredited)
- Easy Living (1937) as First Partner (uncredited)
- Murder in Greenwich Village (1937) as Ship's Officer (uncredited)
- Outlaws of the Prairie (1937) as Bearded Townsman (uncredited)
- Paid to Dance (1937) as Dance Hall Floor Manager (uncredited)
- All American Sweetheart (1937) as Waiter (uncredited)
- The Shadow (1937) as Dutch Schultz
- Little Miss Roughneck (1938) - (uncredited)
- Wee Wee Monsieur (1938, Short) as Sheikh Tsimmis (uncredited)
- Who Killed Gail Preston? (1938) as Bill, the Watchman
- Women in Prison (1938) as Guard (uncredited)
- Start Cheering (1938) as Pops, the Soda Jerk (uncredited)
- When G-Men Step In (1938) - Colonel (uncredited)
- Tassels in the Air (1938, Short) as Building Superintendent (uncredited)
- The Lone Wolf in Paris (1938) as Rene Ledaux (uncredited)
- Reformatory (1938) as Cook Howard
- You Can't Take It with You (1938) as Expressman (uncredited)
- Juvenile Court (1938) as Mr. Schultz (uncredited)
- Mutts to You (1938, Short) as Mr. Stutz, Hotel Manager (uncredited)
- Thanks for the Memory (1938) as Refuse Man (uncredited)
- Three Little Sew and Sews (1939, Short) as Party Guest (uncredited)
- The Lone Wolf Spy Hunt (1939) as Fat Man at Party (uncredited)
- A Ducking They Did Go (1939, Short) as Vegetarian in Hallway (uncredited)
- Only Angels Have Wings (1939) as Ship's Captain (uncredited)
- Yes, We Have No Bonanza (1939, Short) as Sheriff (uncredited)
- Saved by the Belle (1939, Short) as Mike (uncredited)
- Stanley and Livingstone (1939) as Newspaperman in Office (uncredited)
- Hitler – Beast of Berlin (1939) as Lustig - Beer Garden Bartender
- Mr. Smith Goes to Washington (1939) as Senate Reporter (uncredited)
- The Lone Wolf Strikes (1940) as Hotel Doorman (uncredited)
- The Doctor Takes a Wife (1940) as Man Outside Phone Booth (uncredited)
- Nutty but Nice (1940, Short) as Dr. Walters (uncredited)
- How High Is Up? (1940, Short) as Mr. Blake (uncredited)
- The Lady in Question (1940) as Gendarme (uncredited)
- From Nurse to Worse (1940, Short) as Dr. D. Lerious (uncredited)
- He Stayed for Breakfast (1940) as Chef (uncredited)
- No Census, No Feeling (1940, Short) as Moe's Bridge Partner (uncredited)
- The Villain Still Pursued Her (1940) as Jim - Policeman (uncredited)
- So Long Mr. Chumps (1941, Short) as Desk Sergeant (uncredited)
- You're the One (1941) as Zeno Springs Hotel Guest
- Meet John Doe (1941) - minor role (uncredited)
- Dutiful But Dumb (1941, Short) as Mr. Wilson (uncredited)
- Adventure in Washington (1941) as Senator on exercise bike (uncredited)
- San Antonio Rose (1941) as Worthington (uncredited)
- I'll Never Heil Again (1941, Short) as Mr. Ixnay (uncredited)
- An Ache in Every Stake (1941, Short) as Poindexter Lawrence (uncredited)
- In the Sweet Pie and Pie (1941, Short) ad Senator (uncredited)
- Bedtime Story (1941) as Conventioneer (uncredited)
- Loco Boy Makes Good (1942, Short) as Balbo the Magician (uncredited)
- Sappy Birthday (1942, Short) as Neighbor Policeman, trying to sleep in the daytime
- Cactus Makes Perfect (1942, Short) as Heavyset Prospector (uncredited)
- House of Errors (1942) as White
- My Favorite Blonde (1942) as Ole (uncredited)
- Matri-Phony (1942, Short) as Emperor Octopus Grabus
- Three Smart Saps (1942, Short) as Disappointed customer of tailor (uncredited)
- The Glass Key (1942) as Bartender Serving Beers (uncredited)
- Even as IOU (1942, Short) as Motorist (uncredited)
- They Stooge to Conga (1943, Short) as Hans - the Nazi (uncredited)
- Back from the Front (1943, Short) as Lt. Dungen (uncredited)
- Higher Than a Kite (1943, Short) as Marshall Boring (uncredited)
- Idle Roomers (1943, Short) as Mr. Leander
- Cowboy in the Clouds (1943) as Newspaper Publisher Whitson (uncredited)
- True to Life (1943) as Bit Role (uncredited)
- Chip Off the Old Block (1944) as Sheffer (uncredited)
- Crash Goes the Hash (1944, Short) as Fuller Bull
- Busy Buddies (1944, Short) as Hotcakes Customer (uncredited)
- Her Primitive Man (1944) as Doorman (uncredited)
- Jam Session (1944) as Butler (uncredited)
- Address Unknown (1944) as Nazi Party Member (uncredited)
- Once Upon a Time (1944) ad Mayor's Aide (uncredited)
- Secret Command (1944) as Shipyard Worker (uncredited)
- Kansas City Kitty (1944) as Repossession Man from A-1 Piano Co. (uncredited)
- San Diego, I Love You (1944) as Mr. Fitzmaurice (uncredited)
- Mrs. Parkington (1944) as Quartet Member (uncredited)
- No Dough Boys (1944, Short) as Hugo, Nazi Spy
- Let's Go Steady (1945) as Bosby (uncredited)
- She Gets Her Man (1945) as Doorman (uncredited)
- Three Pests in a Mess (1945, Short) as Philip Black
- Sagebrush Heroes (1945) as Editor Haynes (uncredited)
- Sing Me a Song of Texas (1945) as Realtor (uncredited)
- See My Lawyer (1945) as Man in Mud Gang (uncredited)
- Booby Dupes (1945, Short) as Captain
- Having Wonderful Crime (1945) - Guest in Room 202 (uncredited)
- Rockin' in the Rockies (1945) - Stanton (uncredited)
- Idiots Deluxe (1945, Short) as Judge (uncredited)
- I Love a Bandleader (1945) as Counter Man (uncredited)
- Song of the Prairie (1945) as Ted Parker (uncredited)
- Snafu (1945) as American Legionnaire (uncredited)
- Beer Barrel Polecats (1946, Short) as Warden
- The Harvey Girls (1946) as Engineer (uncredited)
- A Bird in the Head (1946, Short) as Prof. Panzer
- Night Editor (1946) as Fat Man in Library (uncredited)
- That Texas Jamboree (1946) as Barbershop Patron (uncredited)
- Renegades (1946) as Caleb Smart (uncredited)
- Dangerous Business (1946) as Fat Man (uncredited)
- Cowboy Blues (1946) as Irate Lodger (uncredited)
- It's Great to Be Young (1946) as Pop (uncredited)
- Three Little Pirates (1946, Short) as Governor
- Lone Star Moonlight (1946) as Sheriff
- Half-Wits Holiday (1947, Short) as Prof. Quackenbush
- The Sea of Grass (1947) as Train Conductor (uncredited)
- Out West (1947, Short) as Doctor (uncredited)
- The Secret Life of Walter Mitty (1947) as Bartender (uncredited)
- Wild Harvest (1947) as Farmer (uncredited)
- Merton of the Movies (1947) as Keystone Kop (uncredited)
- Sing a Song of Six Pants (1947, Short) as Detective Sharp
- It Had to Be You (1947) as Man in Drugstore (uncredited)
- Shivering Sherlocks (1948, Short) as Police Capt. Mullins
- Squareheads of the Round Table (1948, Short) as King Arthur
- Fiddlers Three (1948, Short) as King Cole
- Heavenly Daze (1948, Short) as I. Fleecem, attorney
- Mummy's Dummies (1948, Short) - King Rootentooten
- Make Believe Ballroom (1949) as Chef (uncredited)
- A Connecticut Yankee in King Arthur's Court (1949) as Guard (uncredited)
- Hokus Pokus (1949, Short) as Insurance Adjustor
- The Doolins of Oklahoma (1949) as Bank Clerk (uncredited)
- Look for the Silver Lining (1949) as Heckler (uncredited)
- Fuelin' Around (1949, Short) as General
- The Girl from Jones Beach (1949) as Man at Stand (uncredited)
- Malice in the Palace (1949, Short) - Hassan Ben Sober
- Super Wolf (1949, Short) as Police Officer (uncredited)
- And Baby Makes Three (1949) as Umpire (uncredited)
- Punchy Cowpunchers (1950, Short) as Colonel
- The Good Humor Man (1950) as Fat Man in Park (uncredited)
- Kill the Umpire (1950) as Phone Company Manager (uncredited)
- One Shivery Night (1950, Short) as Boss
- Studio Stoops (1950, Short) as Police Captain Casey
- Three Arabian Nuts (1951, Short) as Mr. Bradley
- Scrambled Brains (1951, Short) as Nora's Father
- Bonanza Town (1951) as Whiskers (uncredited)
- Sunny Side of the Street (1951) as King (uncredited)
- The Tooth Will Out (1951, Short) as Dr. Keefer, professor of dentistry
- Pest Man Wins (1951, Short) as Mr. Philander
- A Missed Fortune (1952, Short) as Hotel Manager
- Listen, Judge (1952, Short) as Judge Henderson
- Booty and the Beast (1953, Short) as Night Watchman
- Rip, Sew and Stitch (1953, Short) as Detective Sharp (in 1947 footage from Sing a Song of Six Pants)
- Income Tax Sappy (1954, Short) as Internal Revenue Agent (uncredited)
- Musty Musketeers (1954, Short) as King Cole
- Pals and Gals (1954, Short) as Doctor (uncredited)
- Knutzy Knights (1954, Short) as King Arthur (uncredited)
- The Fire Chaser (1954, Short) as J. Peabody Knott (final film performance)
- Of Cash and Hash (1955, Short) as Police Capt. Mullins (in 1948 footage from Shivering Sherlocks)
- Bedlam in Paradise (1955, Short) as I. Fleecem, attorney (in 1948 footage from Heavenly Daze)
- Flagpole Jitters (1956, Short) as Insurance Adjuster (in 1949 footage from Hokus Pokus)
- Rumpus in the Harem (1956, Short) as Hassan Ben Sober (in 1949 footage from Malice in the Palace)
- Hot Stuff (1956, Short) aa Anemian General (in 1949 footage from Fuelin' Around)
- Guns a Poppin (1957, Short) as Judge (in 1945 footage from Idiots Deluxe)

== Bibliography ==
- Cassara, Bill (2010). Vernon Dent: Stooge Heavy. Albany: BearManor Media ISBN 978-1-59393-549-8
