= Idiots Deluxe =

1945 film by Jules White

- Directed by: Jules White
- Written by: Elwood Ullman
- Produced by: Jules White
- Starring: Moe Howard; Larry Fine; Curly Howard; Vernon Dent; Paul Kruger; Al Thompson; Eddie Laughton; Johnny Kascier
- Cinematography: Glen Gano
- Edited by: Charles Hochberg
- Distributed by: Columbia Pictures
- Release date: July 20, 1945 (U.S.)
- Running time: 17:28
- Country: United States
- Language: English

Idiots Deluxe is a 1945 short subject directed by Jules White starring American slapstick comedy team The Three Stooges (Moe Howard, Larry Fine and Curly Howard). It is the 85th entry in the series released by Columbia Pictures starring the comedians, who released 190 shorts for the studio between 1934 and 1959.

== Plot ==
Moe stands trial for assaulting Larry and Curly, presenting a defense centered on his purported illness and the need for peace and quiet as advised by his physician. The tranquility he seeks is disrupted by the duo's loud rehearsal of their musical routine, "The Original Two-Man Quartet," featuring "She'll Be Coming 'Round the Mountain." In a moment of frustration, Moe restrains Larry and Curly with a trombone slide.

Concerned for Moe's well-being, Larry and Curly decide to alleviate his stress by taking him on a hunting excursion. While in a remote cabin, their plans are thwarted by a hungry bear that ravages their provisions and ultimately wreaks havoc by commandeering their car.

Returning to the courtroom, Moe concludes his narrative by expressing the necessity of returning to bed for an extended period. Moved by his plight, the judge acquits Moe of the charges. However, upon receiving his axe back, Moe immediately resumes his pursuit of Larry and Curly.

== Production notes ==
Idiots Deluxe was filmed on October 5–9, 1944, the last short film produced that year. The title is a satire on Idiot's Delight, a play by Robert E. Sherwood and later an MGM movie of the same title with Norma Shearer and Clark Gable.

Idiots Deluxe marks a change in the title screens, most notably featuring the Greco-Roman comic mask of the Muse Thalia in the upper left-hand corner. This new format would remain in place for the remainder of the Stooges shorts run at Columbia Pictures.

The film is a remake of Oh, My Nerves, starring Monte Collins and Tom Kennedy. It would be remade with the Stooges again in 1957 as Guns a Poppin, using minimal stock footage. The initial plotline of a person going on a retreat to heal an illness was originally done by Laurel and Hardy in the 1934 film Them Thar Hills.

One notable gag was the Stooges' unorthodox cuisine. Idiots Deluxe shows Larry and Curly putting almost every known condiment onto slices of bread but, not surprisingly, they are never shown actually eating the whole bread (partly because Moe interrupts them before they can). Moe then pours honey and ketchup on bread, declaring "If there's anything I like better than honey and ketchup, it's bologna and whipped cream—and we haven't got any!" Like Larry and Curly, Moe also does not eat his concoction, though he is seen biting a small piece of the crust off.

=== Curly's illness ===
At Moe Howard's urging, Curly Howard was admitted to Santa Barbara Cottage Hospital in January 1945, where he was diagnosed with severe hypertension, obesity, and retinal hemorrhaging. The subsequent short film, If a Body Meets a Body, was produced in March 1945, five months after Idiots Deluxe and shortly after Curly had experienced a minor stroke. His subsequent performances with the comedy team reflected a notable decline in energy and quality, evidencing the impact of his deteriorating health.
