= Philip Van Zandt =

Dutch-American actor (1904–1958)

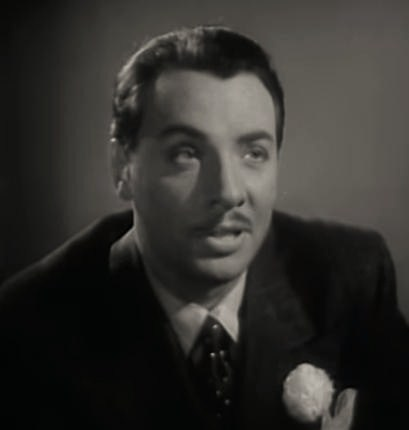
- Zandt in City of Missing Girls (1941)
- Born: Philip Pinheiro; October 4, 1904; Amsterdam, Netherlands
- Died: February 15, 1958 (aged 53); Los Angeles, California, U.S.
- Occupation: Actor
- Years active: 1927–1958

Philip Van Zandt (October 4, 1904 – February 15, 1958), sometimes billed as Phil Van Zandt, was a Dutch-American actor of stage, film, and television. He made nearly 250 film and television appearances between 1939 and 1958.

== Life and career ==
Van Zandt was born Philip Pinheiro in Amsterdam, and brought to the United States when he was five months old in March 1905. Van Zandt made his stage debut in 1925, as an assistant to magician Howard Thurston. He began playing dramatic roles in 1927 and eventually landed on Broadway, appearing in 10 different productions between 1931 and 1938, none of which were hits.

Van Zandt made his Hollywood debut in 1939 and, in the two decades that followed, appeared in over 140 films. The actor auditioned for director John Cromwell's film Flotsam (ultimately released as So Ends Our Night). Cromwell explained that the role called for expert card manipulation. Van Zandt hadn't done this since his apprenticeship with Thurston but, as columnist Duncan Underhill reported, "was game to try. 'All right,' Cromwell said, cutting and shuffling a new deck of cards and passing it over. 'Deal me a royal flush.' Van Zandt flipped out the ace, king, queen, jack, and ten of diamonds. 'Now deal me a contract,' he countered."

Curiously, Van Zandt was under contract to a studio only once (for Columbia, a one-year pact in 1945-46). He made his living as a freelance actor, playing minor supporting roles. In 1941 he played a small but important part as magazine editor Rawlston in the Orson Welles film Citizen Kane. Van Zandt's Dutch-sounding stage name assured him steady employment during wartime as continental types: spies, saboteurs, enemy agents. While under contract to Columbia he began appearing in the studio's two-reel slapstick comedies, beginning with Pardon My Terror (1946) starring Gus Schilling and Richard Lane. Van Zandt went on to work with Andy Clyde, Hugh Herbert, Joe Besser and especially The Three Stooges, remaining with the Columbia shorts unit until it closed in 1957. Philip Van Zandt is chiefly remembered for the Columbia comedies, because he was given featured roles that allowed him more scope. He played butlers, racketeers, military officers, mad scientists, even the Devil in these fast-paced shorts. He also made several appearances in the Joe McDoakes shorts at Warner Bros.

Van Zandt, like many freelance actors, also found work in the new medium of television, appearing in The Buster Keaton Show, Hopalong Cassidy, Jungle Jim, Gang Busters, and I Married Joan, among other programs.

== Later years ==
In the mid-1950s Van Zandt, sensing that his screen career was flagging, supplemented his income by establishing an acting school. By this time he suffered bouts of depression and was spending practically all of his income on compulsive gambling. This led to him committing suicide by overdosing on sleeping pills. His last film appearance was in the Three Stooges comedy Fifi Blows Her Top, released nearly two months after his death.

Van Zandt was cremated; his ashes were placed in the vault at the Chapel of the Pines Crematory in Los Angeles. Van Zandt's cremains were located in Vault 2 by Hollywood Graveyard YouTube channel creator Arthur Dark.

== Partial filmography ==
- Those High Grey Walls (1939) - Freddie (uncredited)
- Dancing Co-Ed (1939) - Short Kidnapper (uncredited)
- Winners of the West (1940) - Henchman (uncredited)
- The Lady in Question (1940) - Second Court Clerk (uncredited)
- Dulcy (1940) - Taxi Driver (uncredited)
- Boobs in Arms (1940) - Soldier (uncredited)
- Where Did You Get That Girl? (1941) - Baxter (uncredited)
- So Ends Our Night (1941) - Bachmann
- In Old Colorado (1941) - Shell Game Operator (uncredited)
- City of Missing Girls (1941) - King Peterson
- Ride on Vaquero (1941) - Blacksmith (uncredited)
- Citizen Kane (1941) - Mr. Rawlston
- They Dare Not Love (1941) - Radio Operator (uncredited)
- Kiss the Boys Goodbye (1941) - Reporter (uncredited)
- New York Town (1941) - Peddler (uncredited)
- The Night of January 16th (1941) - Cuban Hotel Clerk (uncredited)
- Paris Calling (1941) - Thick Workman (uncredited)
- All Through the Night (1942) - Assistant Auctioneer (uncredited)
- Nazi Agent (1942) - Thug (uncredited)
- Maisie Gets Her Man (1942) - First Stage Manager (uncredited)
- Calling Dr. Gillespie (1942) - Detroit Dance Hall Waiter (uncredited)
- Invisible Agent (1942) - SS Man (uncredited)
- Wake Island (1942) - Cpl. Gus Goebbels (uncredited)
- Desperate Journey (1942) - Strolling German Soldier (uncredited)
- Daring Young Man (1942) - Max (uncredited)
- Northwest Rangers (1942) - First Poker Dealer (uncredited)
- Reunion in France (1942) - Customer (uncredited)
- Commandos Strike at Dawn (1942) - Thirsty German Soldier (uncredited)
- The Hard Way (1943) - Eddie, Stage Manager (uncredited)
- Tarzan Triumphs (1943) - Capt. Bausch
- Hit Parade of 1943 (1943) - Orchestra Leader (uncredited)
- Hangmen Also Die! (1943) - Officer (uncredited)
- A Stranger in Town (1943) - Reporter (uncredited)
- Air Raid Wardens (1943) - Herman
- Above Suspicion (1943) - Kurt - Aschenhausen Henchman (uncredited)
- Hostages (1943) - Lt. Eisner
- Adventures of the Flying Cadets (1943, serial) - Herman Klott - alias Jack Hargrove [Chs. 5-8]
- Murder on the Waterfront (1943) - Connors - Sentry (uncredited)
- Always a Bridesmaid (1943) - Waiter (uncredited)
- The Cross of Lorraine (1943) - Propaganda Announcer (uncredited)
- Deerslayer (1943) - Briarthorn
- Old Acquaintance (1943) - Hotel Night Manager (uncredited)
- A Guy Named Joe (1943) - Major (uncredited)
- Tarzan's Desert Mystery (1943) - Minor Role (scenes deleted)
- Passport to Destiny (1944) - Dietrich's Secretary (uncredited)
- None Shall Escape (1944) - Captain (uncredited)
- Shine On, Harvest Moon (1944) - Cullen - Song Publisher (uncredited)
- Hey, Rookie (1944) - Psychiatrist (uncredited)
- The Hitler Gang (1944) - Astrologer (uncredited)
- The Story of Dr. Wassell (1944) - Dutch Gunner (uncredited) (unbilled)
- The Black Parachute (1944) - Lieutenant Capturing Joseph (uncredited)
- The Desert Hawk (1944) - Deok, Brother of the Sword (uncredited)
- Dragon Seed (1944) - Japanese Guard (uncredited)
- Call of the Jungle (1944) - Dozan (uncredited)
- Till We Meet Again (1944) - German Lieutenant (uncredited)
- Swing Hostess (1944) - Merlini - the Magician
- The Big Noise (1944) - Dutchy Glassman (uncredited)
- They Live in Fear (1944) - Provost Marshal (uncredited)
- The Conspirators (1944) - Customs Official (uncredited)
- The Very Thought of You (1944) - Assistant Hotel Desk Clerk (uncredited)
- The Unwritten Code (1944) - Ulrich, German Soldier (uncredited)
- House of Frankenstein (1944) - Inspector Muller
- Sudan (1945) - Setna
- Counter-Attack (1945) - Galkronye
- Boston Blackie Booked on Suspicion (1945) - Reporter (uncredited)
- Boston Blackie's Rendezvous (1945) - Dr. Volkman (uncredited)
- A Thousand and One Nights (1945) - Grand Wazir AbuHassan
- I Love a Bandleader (1945) - Bill (uncredited)
- Outlaws of the Rockies (1945) - Honest Dan Chantry (uncredited)
- The Bandit of Sherwood Forest (1946) - Prioress Guard (uncredited)
- Gilda (1946) - Cartel Member (uncredited)
- A Night in Casablanca (1946) - Headwaiter (uncredited)
- Somewhere in the Night (1946) - Navy Doctor (uncredited)
- Joe Palooka, Champ (1946) - Freddie Wells
- Don't Gamble with Strangers (1946) - Morelli
- The Avalanche (1946) - Malone
- Night and Day (1946) - Librettist (uncredited)
- Below the Deadline (1946) - Oney Kessel
- Monsieur Beaucaire (1946) - Guard (uncredited)
- Decoy (1946) - Tommy
- The Return of Monte Cristo (1946) - Guard (uncredited)
- California (1947) - Mr. Gunce (uncredited)
- Last Frontier Uprising (1947) - Liberal Lyons
- Easy Come, Easy Go (1947) - Mailman (uncredited)
- Slave Girl (1947) - Yusef
- Life with Father (1947) - McCreery's Suit Salesman (uncredited)
- The Lady from Shanghai (1947) - Policeman / Thug (uncredited)
- Squareheads of the Round Table (1948, Short) - The Black Prince
- The Big Clock (1948) - Sidney Kislav
- April Showers (1948) - Harry Swift
- Fiddlers Three (1948, Short) - Murgitroyd, the Magician
- The Street with No Name (1948) - Bail Bondsman (uncredited)
- Embraceable You (1948) - Matt Hethron, Theatrical Agent
- Shanghai Chest (1948) - Joseph Pindello
- The Vicious Circle (1948) - Calomar Balog
- Night Has a Thousand Eyes (1948) - Bookie (uncredited)
- The Loves of Carmen (1948) - Sergeant (uncredited)
- Walk a Crooked Mile (1948) - Anton Radchek
- The Saxon Charm (1948) - Chris (uncredited)
- Mummy's Dummies (1948, Short) - Futamon - Tax Collector
- Life of St. Paul Series (1949) - Antonius Felix
- Alias Nick Beal (1949) - Watchman (uncredited)
- The Lone Wolf and His Lady (1949) - Joe Brewster (uncredited)
- The Lady Gambles (1949) - Chuck
- House of Strangers (1949) - Minor Role (uncredited)
- Fuelin' Around (1949, Short) - Capt. Rork
- Red, Hot and Blue (1949) - Louie, Headwaiter
- Tension (1949) - Lt. Schiavone (uncredited)
- The Blonde Bandit (1950) - Artie Jerome
- Dopey Dicks (1950, Short) - Professor Potter
- The Flame and the Arrow (1950) - Hessian Noble (uncredited)
- Where Danger Lives (1950) - Milo DeLong
- One Shivery Night (1950, Short) - Fortune Hunter
- The Petty Girl (1950) - Señor Chamleon (uncredited)
- Between Midnight and Dawn (1950) - Joe Quist
- Indian Territory (1950) - Curt Raidler
- Copper Canyon (1950) - Sheriff Wattling
- The Jackpot (1950) - Franklin Laswell / Flick Morgan (uncredited)
- Cyrano de Bergerac (1950) - Man with Gazette
- The Du Pont Story (1950) - French Businessman (uncredited)
- Three Arabian Nuts (1951, Short) - Ahmed
- Target Unknown (1951) - Karl (uncredited)
- Missing Women (1951) - Frank Berringer (uncredited)
- Ghost Chasers (1951) - Dr. Basil Granville
- Mask of the Avenger (1951) - Artillery Major (uncredited)
- His Kind of Woman (1951) - Jose Morro
- Two Dollar Bettor (1951) - Ralph Shepard
- The Desert Fox: The Story of Rommel (1951) - German S.S. Man at Hospital (uncredited)
- Ten Tall Men (1951) - Henri (uncredited)
- Submarine Command (1951) - Gavin
- At Sword's Point (1952) - Jacques, Regent's Guardsman (uncredited)
- Viva Zapata! (1952) - Commanding Officer (uncredited)
- Thief of Damascus (1952) - Ali Baba
- Macao (1952) - Customs Official (uncredited)
- The Pride of St. Louis (1952) - Louis (uncredited)
- Son of Ali Baba (1952) - Kareeb (uncredited)
- Yukon Gold (1952) - Clint McClay
- My Man and I (1952) - Doctor (uncredited)
- Because of You (1952) - Marvel (uncredited)
- The Girl Who Had Everything (1953) - Victor's Colleague (uncredited)
- A Perilous Journey (1953) - Tout (uncredited)
- Spooks! (1953, Short) - Dr. Jeckyl
- Fort Algiers (1953) - Tribal Leader (uncredited)
- Ride, Vaquero! (1953) - Second Roulette Croupier (uncredited)
- Clipped Wings (1953) - Joe Eckler
- Champ for a Day (1953) - Mr. Jensen - Finance Man (uncredited)
- Prisoners of the Casbah (1953) - Selim
- Captain John Smith and Pocahontas (1953) - Davis
- Three Sailors and a Girl (1953) - Garage Owner (uncredited)
- Dragon's Gold (1954) - Sen
- Knock on Wood (1954) - Brutchik (uncredited)
- Yankee Pasha (1954) - Bassan Sa'id
- Playgirl (1954) - Lew Martel
- Musty Musketeers (1954, Short) - Mergatroyd the Magician
- The High and the Mighty (1954) - Mr. Wilson (uncredited)
- Gog (1954) - Dr. Pierre Elzevir
- Apache (1954) - Inspector (uncredited)
- The Gambler from Natchez (1954) - Dealer (uncredited)
- Knutzy Knights (1954, Short) - The Black Prince
- Scotched in Scotland (1954, Short) - Dean O.U. Gonga
- 3 Ring Circus (1954) - Shell Game Operator (uncredited)
- The Big Combo (1955, Short) - Mr. Jones (scenes deleted)
- Untamed (1955) - Schuman (uncredited)
- Bedlam in Paradise (1955, Short) - The Devil aka Mr. Heller
- I Cover the Underworld (1955) - Jake Freeman
- To Catch a Thief (1955) - Jewelry Clerk (uncredited)
- Adventures of Superman (TV series) - episode "King For A Day" as Miral, traitorous military officer
- Father Knows Best (1956 TV series) S3E4 Man About Town - The Great Merado (uncredited)
- Uranium Boom (1956) - Navajo Charlie
- Our Miss Brooks (1956 TV series) - Mr. Webster
- Three for Jamie Dawn (1956) - District Attorney Marshall (uncredited)
- Hot Stuff (1956, Short) - Anemian Captain
- Around the World in 80 Days (1956) - Minor Role (uncredited)
- Shoot-Out at Medicine Bend (1957) - Emporium Barker (uncredited)
- Beau James (1957) - Reporter (uncredited)
- The Lonely Man (1957) - Burnsey (uncredited)
- Sweet Smell of Success (1957) - Radio Program Director (uncredited)
- The 27th Day (1957) - Taxi Driver (uncredited)
- The Midnight Story (1957) - Vince de Paul (uncredited)
- The Pride and the Passion (1957) - Vidal
- Man of a Thousand Faces (1957) - George Loane Tucker
- The Crooked Circle (1957) - Max Maxwell
- Outer Space Jitters (1957, Short) - The High Mucky Muck
- Fifi Blows Her Top (1958, Short) - Mort, Fifi's Husband (final film role)
