= Three Arabian Nuts =

1951 film by Edward Bernds

- Directed by: Edward Bernds
- Written by: Elwood Ullman
- Produced by: Hugh McCollum
- Starring: Moe Howard; Larry Fine; Shemp Howard; Vernon Dent; Philip Van Zandt; Dick Curtis; Wesley Bly
- Edited by: Henry DeMond
- Distributed by: Columbia Pictures
- Release date: January 4, 1951 (U.S.)
- Running time: 15:45
- Country: United States
- Language: English

Three Arabian Nuts is a 1951 short subject directed by Edward Bernds starring American slapstick comedy team The Three Stooges (Moe Howard, Larry Fine and Shemp Howard). It is the 129th entry in the series released by Columbia Pictures starring the comedians, who released 190 shorts for the studio between 1934 and 1959.

== Plot ==
The Stooges, employed as warehouse workers at the Superior Warehouse and Storage Company, are tasked with delivering Arabian antiques to client John Bradley. During the unpacking process at Mr. Bradley's residence, Shemp inadvertently discovers a peculiar item, initially mistaking it for a "syrup pitcher" until it is identified as a magic lamp. Upon cleaning the lamp, a djinni materializes, surprising Shemp.

While addressing the djinni as "genius," the Stooges find themselves pursued by two Arabian adversaries intent on acquiring the lamp's magical powers. Unaware of the lamp's capabilities, Mr. Bradley unwittingly presents it to Shemp. Although only Shemp and Larry are cognizant of the lamp's enchantments, Moe remains skeptical.

Ultimately, the thugs are apprehended with the aid of the djinni's ingenuity. In the denouement, the Stooges, accompanied by their companions and in possession of a million dollars, embark on a vacation, leaving Mr. Bradley in a state of dismay as he resorts to self-inflicted blows with a hammer for his unwitting contribution to the Stooges' newfound fortune.

== Cast ==
=== Credited ===
- Moe Howard as Moe
- Larry Fine as Larry
- Shemp Howard as Shemp
- Vernon Dent as John Bradley
- Philip Van Zandt as Ahmed
- Dick Curtis as Hassan
- Wesley Bly as Amos, the "Genius" of the Lamp

=== Uncredited ===
- Lillian Molieri as harem girl
- Unknown actress as 2nd harem girl (uncredited)
- Unknown actress as 3rd harem girl

== Production notes ==
Three Arabian Nuts was filmed on January 9–12, 1950, nearly one year prior to its January 1951 release. This is the fifteenth of sixteen Stooge shorts with the word "three" in the title. The film's title is a parody of Arabian Nights, a collection of West and South Asian stories and folk tales compiled in Arabic during the Islamic Golden Age.
