= One Shivery Night =

1950 film

One Shivery Night is an American comedy short released by Columbia Pictures on July 13, 1950. It stars Hugh Herbert, Dudley Dickerson, Vernon Dent, Philip Van Zandt, and Robert Williams. This was the last of four "scare comedies" that teamed Herbert and Dickerson together.

== Plot ==
Hugh Herbert is the owner of a construction company whose business is at a standstill. A prospective client (Vernon Dent) visits and tells Hugh about a spooky mansion that needs to be demolished. Along with his assistant Julius (Dudley Dickerson) the two head to the mansion where they are met by two men (Philip Van Zandt and Robert Williams) who have been tearing the mansion apart looking for a fortune hidden somewhere inside the house. The men soon mistake Hugh and Julius as claim jumpers and do everything they can to scare them away.
