= Rumpus in the Harem =

1956 film by Jules White

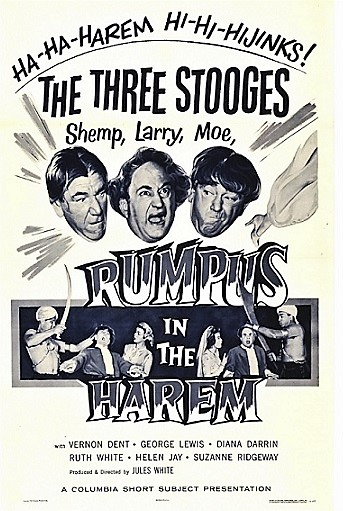
- Directed by: Jules White
- Written by: Felix Adler
- Produced by: Jules White
- Starring: Moe Howard; Larry Fine; Shemp Howard; Joe Palma; Vernon Dent; George J. Lewis; Diana Darrin; Helen Jay; Ruth Godfrey White; Harriette Tarler; Suzanne Ridgeway; Johnny Kascier
- Cinematography: Ray Cory
- Edited by: Harold White
- Distributed by: Columbia Pictures
- Release date: June 21, 1956 (U.S.)
- Running time: 15:56
- Country: United States
- Language: English

Rumpus in the Harem is a 1956 short subject directed by Jules White starring American slapstick comedy team The Three Stooges (Moe Howard, Larry Fine and Shemp Howard). It is the 171st entry in the series released by Columbia Pictures starring the comedians, who appeared in 190 shorts for the studio between 1934 and 1959.

== Plot ==
The Stooges are proprietors of the Cafe Casbah Bah, an establishment situated in a Middle Eastern milieu. Their morning commences with an abrupt awakening by their distressed romantic partners, beseeching financial assistance to alleviate an incurred debt. Amidst their culinary endeavors, catering to patrons such as Hassan Ben Sober and the Gin of Rummy, the Stooges engage in deliberation over strategies to procure the requisite funds.

In the course of their activities, the Stooges chance upon a revelation regarding the clandestine intentions of their patrons, who harbor designs to pilfer a priceless diamond ensconced within the tomb of Rootentooten. Their scheme, however, is thwarted upon realization that the diamond has already fallen into the possession of the Emir of Schmow. Subsequently, the Stooges expel the disconcerted plotters from their establishment.

Undeterred by these developments, the Stooges embark on a quest to secure the diamond themselves, enticed by the promise of a substantial monetary reward. Adopting the guise of Santa Claus, the trio infiltrates the palace of the Emir of Shmow, where they successfully procure the diamond despite encountering resistance from a formidable guardian.

== Cast ==
=== Credited ===
- Moe Howard as Moe
- Larry Fine as Larry
- Shemp Howard as Shemp (stock footage)
- Vernon Dent as Hassan Ben Sober (stock footage)
- George J. Lewis as Ginna Rumma (stock footage)

=== Uncredited ===
- Joe Palma as Shemp (new footage)
- Frank Lackteen as Haffa Dalla (stock footage)
- Johnny Kascier as Emir of Schmow (stock footage)
- Everett Brown as Nubian Guard (stock footage)
- Ruth Godfrey, Diana Darrin and Helen Jay as the Stooges' Girlfriends
- Harriette Tarler and Suzanne Ridgeway as Harem Girls
- Jerome Johnson and Alfred Johnson as Nubian Guards
- Jock Mahoney as the gunman in the bar

== Production notes ==
Rumpus in the Harem is a remake of 1949's Malice in the Palace, using ample stock footage. It was the first of four shorts filmed in the wake of Shemp Howard's November 1955 death using earlier footage and a stand-in: all new footage was shot on January 10, 1956.

=== "Fake Shemp" ===
As Shemp Howard had already died, for these last four films (Rumpus in the Harem, Hot Stuff, Scheming Schemers and Commotion on the Ocean), Columbia utilized supporting actor Joe Palma to be Shemp's double. Even though the last four shorts were remakes of earlier Shemp efforts, Palma's services were needed to film new scenes in order to link existing stock footage.

For Rumpus in the Harem, Palma is seen from the back several times. The first time occurs in the restaurant when Moe declares that the trio must do something to help their sweethearts. Larry then concludes the conversation by saying "I've got it, I've got it!" Moe inquires with "What?" Larry replies, "a terrific headache!" Later, Palma is seen from the back being chased in circles by the palace guard. A few lines of dialogue appear — "Whoa, Moe, Larry! Moe, help!" — by dubbing Shemp's voice from the soundtracks of Fuelin' Around and Blunder Boys. Palma also appears from the side with Moe and Larry in a promo photo looking up at the two Harem girls. As Palma was the farthest from the camera, half his face was allowed to be seen. Palma is seen one final time, making a mad dash for the open window, and supplying his own yell before making the final jump. This was one of the few times during his tenure as Shemp's double that Palma was required to speak without the aid of dubbing.

== See also ==
- List of American films of 1956
