= Guns a Poppin =

1957 film by Jules White

Guns a Poppin!
- Directed by: Jules White
- Screenplay by: Jack White
- Story by: Jack White; Elwood Ullman
- Produced by: Jules White
- Starring: Moe Howard; Larry Fine; Joe Besser; Vernon Dent; Frank Sully; Joe Palma
- Cinematography: Henry Freulich
- Edited by: Saul A. Goodkind
- Distributed by: Columbia Pictures
- Release date: June 13, 1957 (U.S.)
- Running time: 16:27
- Country: United States
- Language: English

Guns a Poppin! is a 1957 short subject directed by Jules White starring American slapstick comedy team The Three Stooges (Moe Howard, Larry Fine and Joe Besser). It is the 179th entry in the series released by Columbia Pictures starring the comedians, who released 190 shorts for the studio between 1934 and 1959.

== Plot ==
Moe stands trial for assaulting his comrades Larry and Joe, pleading with Judge (Vernon Dent) that he was under medical advice to maintain tranquility. However, the serenity is shattered by Larry and Joe's raucous rehearsal of their musical act, exacerbating Moe's fragile condition. Losing control, Moe ensnares Larry's trombone apparatus around their collective neck.

Concerned for Moe's well-being, Larry and Joe propose a therapeutic hunting excursion to alleviate his stress. Moe eagerly embraces the suggestion, and they embark on their journey. However, their respite is short-lived as they encounter a hungry bear, which pilfers their provisions. Frazzled, Moe implores Larry and Joe to confront the bear, leading to a sequence of mishaps that culminate in the bear absconding with their vehicle.

Further complications ensue when the trio inadvertently becomes entangled in a pursuit led by Sheriff, targeting outlaw Mad Bill Hookup. Despite unwittingly capturing Hookup and earning a substantial reward, their subsequent blunder allows the fugitive to escape, incensing the sheriff and prompting Moe to lash out at his companions.

Returning to court, Moe concludes his narrative, attributing his need for prolonged rest to his tumultuous experiences. Moved by Moe's plight, the judge exonerates him. However, the verdict elicits dismay from Larry and Joe, and their subsequent altercation with Moe leads to further chaos, compounded by the fortuitous intervention of Larry's resilient cranium.

== Cast ==
=== Credited ===
- Moe Howard as Moe
- Larry Fine as Larry
- Joe Besser as Joe
- Vernon Dent as Judge (stock footage)
- Joe Palma as Mad Bill Hookup
- Frank Sully as Sheriff

=== Uncredited ===
- Johnny Kascier as Courtroom Spectator
- Paul Kruger as Bailiff (stock footage)

== Production notes ==
Guns a Poppin! is a remake of 1945's Idiots Deluxe, using a minimal amount of stock footage from the original. All new scenes were filmed on November 28, 1956.

In the scene of an irate Moe wrapping a trombone slide around Larry and Joe's necks, audio of Curly's groans from Idiots Deluxe can be heard briefly.

== See also ==
- List of American films of 1957
