= Johnny Kascier =

American actor (1889–1974)

- Born: July 1, 1889; Minnesota, United States
- Died: May 10, 1974 (aged 84); South Pasadena, California
- Years active: 1932-1957

Johnny Kascier (born John Kacerosky; July 1, 1889 – May 10, 1974) was an American actor who appeared in over 90 films between 1932 and 1957.

Modern viewers will recognize Kascier as the Emir of Schmow in the Three Stooges film Malice in the Palace and its remake Rumpus in the Harem, and as the hotel bellboy who catches Moe kissing Larry's cheek in Brideless Groom. He also had an uncredited role of a courtroom spectator in Idiots Deluxe. More often than not, though, Kascier's face was rarely seen, as his primary role at Columbia Pictures was as Moe Howard's stunt double.

Kascier died on May 10, 1974.

== Filmography ==
Year	Title	Role	Notes
1932	Hypnotized	Clown	Uncredited
1933	Sons of the Desert	Steamship Onlooker - Theatre Patron	Uncredited
1934	The Cat's-Paw	Photographer	Uncredited
1935	The Best Man Wins	Seaman	Uncredited
1935	Eight Bells	Seaman	Uncredited
1940	The Shadow	Henchman	Serial, Uncredited
1940	The Green Archer	Jake	Serial, Uncredited
1940	The Phantom Submarine	Sailor	Uncredited
1941	White Eagle	Rowdy	Serial, Uncredited
1941	Holt of the Secret Service	Jenson	Serial, Uncredited
1942	Two Yanks in Trinidad	Seaman	Uncredited
1942	The Girl from Alaska	Native	Uncredited
1943	There's Something About a Soldier	Aide	Uncredited
1946	Gallant Journey	Barker	Uncredited
1950	Kill the Umpire	Churchill - Umpire Trainee	Uncredited
1950	Between Midnight and Dawn	Minor Role	Uncredited
1950	Emergency Wedding	Barber	Uncredited
1952	Sound Off	Father	Uncredited
1953	Let's Do It Again	Nightclub Waiter	Uncredited
