= Everett Brown =

American actor (1902–1953)

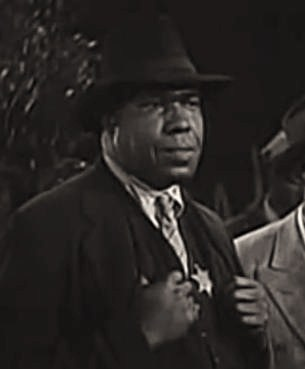
- Brown in The Duke Is Tops (1938)
- Born: January 1, 1902; Smith County, Texas, U.S.
- Died: October 14, 1953 (aged 51); Los Angeles, California, U.S.
- Years active: 1927–1953

Everett G. Brown (January 1, 1902 – October 14, 1953) was an American actor.

== Biography ==
Born in Texas, Brown appeared in about 40 Hollywood films between 1927 and 1953. His roles were small most of the time and most of his film appearances were uncredited. He often portrayed natives or slaves, including the "Big Sam", the kind-hearted slave field foreman of Tara, in Gone with the Wind (1939). He also played a supporting role in Congo Maisie (1940) with Ann Sothern and the Native in an Ape costume in King Kong (1933). Brown retired from film business in 1940, only to return in 1949 to make four films before he died in 1953. He is buried in Evergreen Cemetery, Los Angeles.

== Selected filmography ==
- South Sea Love (1927) - Nahalo
- Danger Island (1931) - Cebu
- West of Broadway (1931) - Joe Williams (uncredited)
- Hell's Headquarters (1932) - Kuba
- Jungle Mystery (1932) - Native with Machete (uncredited)
- Kongo (1932) - Native Reporting to Gregg (uncredited)
- The Mask of Fu Manchu (1932) - Slave (uncredited)
- I Am a Fugitive from a Chain Gang (1932) - Sebastian (uncredited)
- Nagana (1933) - Nogu
- King Kong (1933) - Native in Ape Costume (uncredited)
- The Narrow Corner (1933) - Oo Tan, a Crewman (uncredited)
- Tarzan the Fearless (1933) - Bearer (uncredited)
- Tarzan and His Mate (1934) - Bearer (uncredited)
- Sing and Like It (1934) - Fenny's Butler (uncredited)
- Murder in Trinidad (1934) - Native (uncredited)
- Kid Millions (1934) - Slave (uncredited)
- Under Pressure (1935) - Iron Man (uncredited)
- The Lost City (1935, Serial) - Boyo - a Giant [Chs. 1–2, 10-12] (uncredited)
- Les Miserables (1935) - Black Convict (uncredited)
- Tarzan Escapes (1936) - Hostile Native Chief (uncredited)
- The Plainsman (1936) - (uncredited)
- White Hunter (1936) - Minor Role (uncredited)
- Jungle Jim (1937, Serial) - Native (uncredited)
- Dark Manhattan (1937) - Numbers Banker (uncredited)
- Nancy Steele Is Missing! (1937) - Billy Tarabull (uncredited)
- Nothing Sacred (1937) - Policeman (uncredited)
- Tim Tyler's Luck (1937) - Mogu
- The Duke Is Tops (1938) - Sheriff
- The Texans (1938) - Man with Watches (uncredited)
- Boys Town (1938) - Darky (uncredited)
- Gang Smashers (1938) - Police Lieutenant
- Stand Up and Fight (1939) - Big Black Man Breaking Bottle (uncredited)
- Tell No Tales (1939) - Doorman at the Alley Cat (uncredited)
- Stanley and Livingstone (1939) - Bongo (uncredited)
- Blackmail (1939) - Black Prisoner (uncredited)
- Gone with the Wind (1939) - Big Sam - Field Foreman
- Congo Maisie (1940) - Jallah
- Zanzibar (1940) - Umboga
- The Great Dan Patch (1949) - Stablehand (uncredited)
- Malice in the Palace (1949)-Nubian Guard (uncredited)
- Rope of Sand (1949) - Batsuma Chief (uncredited)
- White Witch Doctor (1953) - Bakuba King (uncredited) (final film role)
