= Shemp Howard =

American comedian and actor (1895–1955)

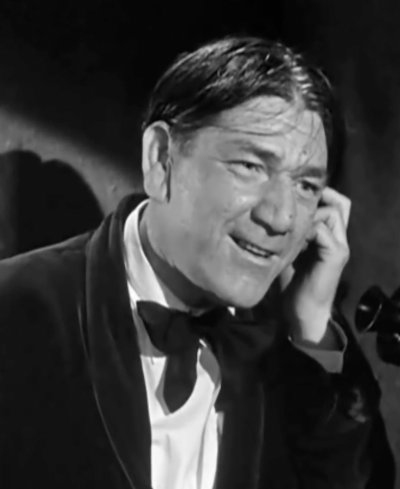
- Howard in Brideless Groom in 1947
- Born: Samuel Horwitz; March 11, 1895; Brooklyn, New York, U.S.
- Died: November 22, 1955 (aged 60); Los Angeles, California, U.S.
- Resting place: Home of Peace Cemetery; East Los Angeles, California
- Other name: Sam Howard
- Occupations: Comedian; actor
- Years active: 1923–1955
- Known for: The Three Stooges
- Spouse: Gertrude Frank (m. 1925)
- Children: 1
- Relatives: Moe Howard (brother); Curly Howard (brother); Joan Howard Maurer (niece)
- Website: threestooges.com

Shemp Howard (born Samuel Horwitz; March 11, 1895 – November 22, 1955) was an American comedian and actor. He is best known as the third Stooge in The Three Stooges, a role he played when the act began in the early 1920s (1923–1932), while it was still associated with Ted Healy and known as "Ted Healy and his Stooges"; and again from 1946 until his death in 1955. During the fourteen years between his times with the Stooges, he had a successful solo career as a film comedian, including a series of shorts by himself and with partners. He reluctantly returned to the Stooges as a favor to his brother Moe and friend Larry Fine to replace his brother Curly as the third Stooge after Curly's illness.

== Early life ==
Howard was born Samuel Horwitz on March 11, 1895 in Bensonhurst, Brooklyn, New York (later part of New York City). He was the third of five Horwitz brothers born to Lithuanian Jewish parents Solomon Horwitz (1872–1943) and Jennie Horwitz (née Gorovitz; 1870–1939). His parents, who were second cousins, were from Kaunas and spoke the Litvak dialect of Yiddish. They married in 1888 and two years later immigrated to New York City. They initially lived with Jennie's brother Julius in Manhattan before eventually moving to Brooklyn, where they started their family. He had two older brothers, Isadore "Irving" (1891–1939) and Benjamin Jacob "Jack" (1893–1976). His two younger brothers were Moses "Moe" (1897–1975) and Jerome "Curly" (1903–1952).

Howard, who was named Samuel after his mother's grandfather, Shmuel, was known as Sam. However, his mother's thick accent left her unable to articulate the name Sam. Instead she pronounced it as Shem and then Shemp, the latter of which stuck as his nickname.

== Career ==
=== Show business ===
Shemp's brother Moe Howard started in show business as a youngster, on stage and in films. Moe and Shemp eventually tried their hands as minstrel-show-style "blackface" comedians with an act they called "Howard and Howard – A Study in Black". At the same time, they worked for a rival vaudeville circuit, without makeup. Shemp was drafted into the U.S. Army during World War I. He was discharged for medical reasons nearly a month after.

In 1922, Moe teamed up with his boyhood friend Ted Healy in a "roughhouse" act. In 1923, Moe spotted his brother Shemp in the audience and yelled at him from the stage. Quick-witted Shemp yelled right back, and walked up onto the stage. From then on he was part of the act, usually known as "Ted Healy and His Stooges". The Howard brothers were the original Stooges; Larry Fine joined them in 1925. On stage, Healy sang and told jokes while his three noisy stooges got in his way, and Healy retaliated with physical and verbal abuse. Shemp played a bumbling fireman in the Stooges' first film, Soup to Nuts (1930), the only film where he played one of Healy's gang.

After a disagreement with Healy in August 1930, Moe, Larry and Shemp left to launch their own act, "Howard, Fine & Howard", and joined the RKO vaudeville circuit. They premiered at Los Angeles's Paramount Theatre in August 1930. In 1931, they added "Three Lost Soles" to the act's name and took on Jack Walsh as their straight man. Moe, Larry, and Shemp continued until July 1932, when Ted Healy approached them to team up again for the Shuberts' Broadway revue "Passing Show of 1932", and they accepted the offer. In spite of their past differences, Moe knew an association with the nationally known Healy would provide opportunities the three comics were not getting on their own.

On August 16, 1932, in a contract dispute, Healy walked out of the Shuberts' revue during rehearsals. Three days later, tired of what he considered Healy's domineering handling of the Stooges' career, Shemp left Healy's act to remain with "Passing Show", which closed in September during roadshow performances and after pan reviews in Detroit and Cincinnati. Shemp regrouped to form his own act and played on the road for a few months. When he split from Healy, Shemp was immediately replaced by his and Moe's younger brother Jerry Howard, known as Curly.

=== Solo years ===
After leaving Healy's Stooges, Shemp Howard, like many New York City-based performers, found work at the Vitaphone short-subject studio in Brooklyn. Originally playing bit roles in Vitaphone's Roscoe Arbuckle comedies of 1933, showing off his comical appearance, he was given speaking roles and supporting parts almost immediately. He was featured with studio comics Jack Haley, Ben Blue, and Gus Shy; and then co-starred with Harry Gribbon, Daphne Pollard, and Johnnie Berkes. When Roscoe Arbuckle died suddenly in June 1933, Vitaphone needed a new series to replace the popular Arbuckle comedies. Shemp Howard was then promoted to starring comedian.

While in New York he was featured in a two-reel musical comedy for Van Beuren, The Knife of the Party (1934), alongside actors James Fox and Charles Senna as "Shemp Howard and Stooges". He worked in short subjects exclusively until 1934, when he accepted a character part in the feature film Convention Girl, an independent production filmed in New York and New Jersey. Shemp was featured in a very rare straight role as a blackmailer and suspected murderer.

Shemp preferred to improvise dialogue and jokes, which became his trademark. In late 1935, Vitaphone was licensed to produce a series of two-reel short comedies based on the Joe Palooka comic strip. Shemp was cast as Knobby Walsh, Palooka's boxing manager, and although only a supporting character, he became the comic focus of the series, with Johnnie Berkes and Lee Weber as his foils. He co-starred in the first seven shorts, released in 1936–1937.

In 1937, Shemp followed his brothers' lead, moved to the West Coast, and landed supporting roles at several studios, mainly Columbia Pictures and Universal. At first he freelanced, lending comic relief to murder mysteries with Charlie Chan and The Thin Man. He worked exclusively at Universal from August 1940 to August 1943, performing with W. C. Fields, Abbott and Costello, Olsen and Johnson, and the Little Tough Guys, among others. He appeared in several Universal B-musicals of the early 1940s: San Antonio Rose (1941) paired him with Lon Chaney Jr. as a faux Abbott and Costello. Other budget musicals included Private Buckaroo (1942), Strictly in the Groove (1942), How's About It? (1943), and Moonlight and Cactus (1944). Most of these projects took advantage of his improvisational skills. When Broadway comedian Frank Fay walked out on a series of feature films teaming him with Billy Gilbert, Gilbert called on his closest friend, Shemp Howard, to replace him in three B-comedy features for Monogram Pictures, filmed in 1944–45. He also played a few serious parts, such as his supporting role in Pittsburgh (1942), starring Marlene Dietrich and John Wayne.

=== The Three Stooges: 1946–1955 ===
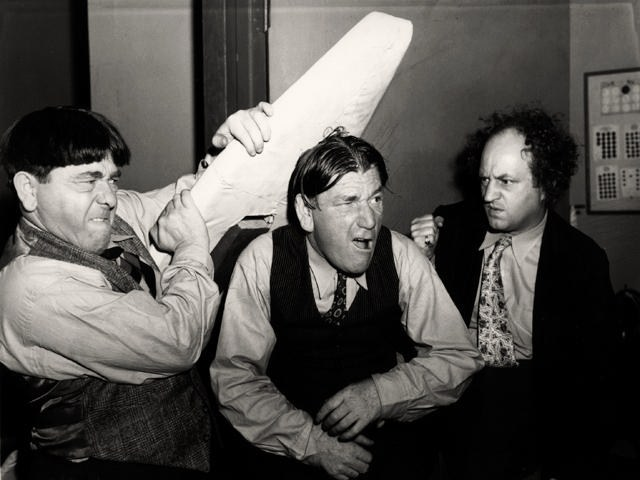
Shemp with his younger brother Moe Howard and partner Larry Fine in Sing a Song of Six Pants in 1947

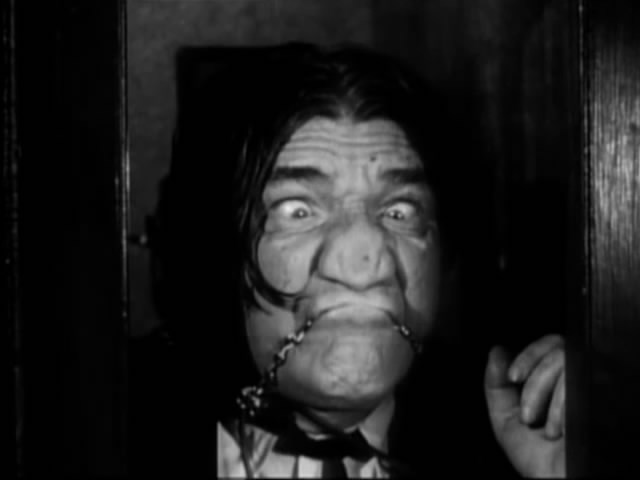
Shemp in Brideless Groom in 1947

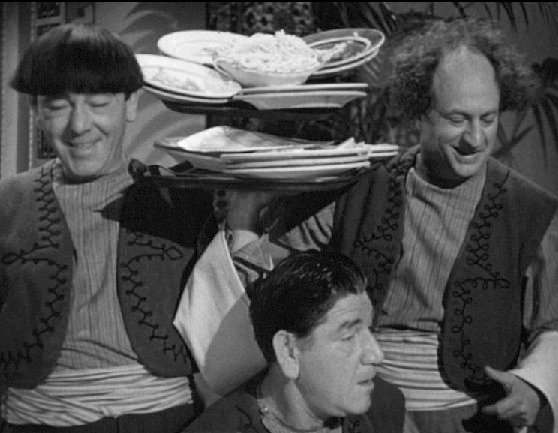
Moe Howard, Shemp (bottom center), and Larry Fine in Malice in the Palace in 1949

From 1938 to 1940 and again from 1944 to 1946, Howard appeared in Columbia's two-reel comedies, co-starring with Columbia regulars Andy Clyde, The Glove Slingers, El Brendel, and Tom Kennedy. He was given his own starring series in 1944. Meanwhile, his brother Curly's health was declining. Curly had suffered a series of strokes prior to the filming of If a Body Meets a Body (1945), culminating in a medical emergency with Shemp rushing to his brothers' aid. As Variety reported in January 1945: "Vaude dates for the Three Stooges have been canceled because of illnesses of Curley [sic] Howard. Howard was taken ill at the St. Charles Theatre, New Orleans, last week. Shemp Howard subbed for that engagement. Stands in Cleveland, Boston, and Chicago had to be called off."

While Shemp was starring in his own Columbia shorts, Curly was felled by a debilitating stroke on May 6, 1946. Shemp agreed to fill in for Curly in the Stooge shorts until Curly was well enough to work. In a letter to Curly, Moe wrote: "The first picture in which Shemp operates in your place was very good, but altho [sic] Shemp is a great comic in his own right, Larry and I miss you very much and we are hoping and praying to have you back with us soon now." Curly never regained his health, and died on January 18, 1952, at the age of 48. Shemp remained with the Stooges for the rest of his life.

Shemp's role as the third Stooge was much different from Curly's; his characterization was more relaxed as opposed to Curly's energetic persona. Also unlike Curly, who had many distinct mannerisms, Shemp's most notable characteristic as a Stooge was a high-pitched "heep-heep-heep-heep!" sound, a sort of soft screech done by inhaling. This sound was a multipurpose effect: he emitted it when scared, sleeping (as a form of snoring), overtly happy, or dazed. It became his trademark sound as the "nyuk nyuk" sound had become Curly's. Because of his established solo career, he was also given opportunities in the films to do some of his own comic routines. "Shemp was an instinctive actor, a great improviser," recalled director Edward Bernds. "Many times when I was directing him, I would actually delay in cutting a scene just to see what he would do. He used to bowl me over with the things he'd dream up."

During this period, The Three Stooges ventured into live television appearances, beginning on Tuesday, October 19, 1948, with Milton Berle on his Texaco Star Theatre program.

Shemp appeared with Moe and Larry in 77 short subjects. The trio also made the independently produced feature film Gold Raiders (1951) with their Columbia colleagues Edward Bernds and Elwood Ullman.

Shemp suffered a mild stroke in November 1952, but recovered within weeks. The medical episode had no noticeable effect on his remaining films with the Stooges. Historians Ted Okuda and Edward Watz explain: "To cope with skyrocketing production costs, [producer-director] Jules White grew dependent on lifting footage from earlier shorts, then filming a handful of new sequences to comply with the older scenes, using identical sets and as many of the original cast members as possible." This eased the burden on the Stooges, who could now film their scenes in one or two days instead of four or five.

== Personal life ==
In September 1925, Shemp married Gertrude Frank (1905–1982). They had one child, Morton Horwitz, born in Brooklyn on February 26, 1927. Morton died in 1972.

Shemp had several phobias, including of airplanes, automobiles, dogs, and water. According to Moe's autobiography, Shemp was involved in a driving accident as a teenager and never obtained a driver's license.

== Death ==
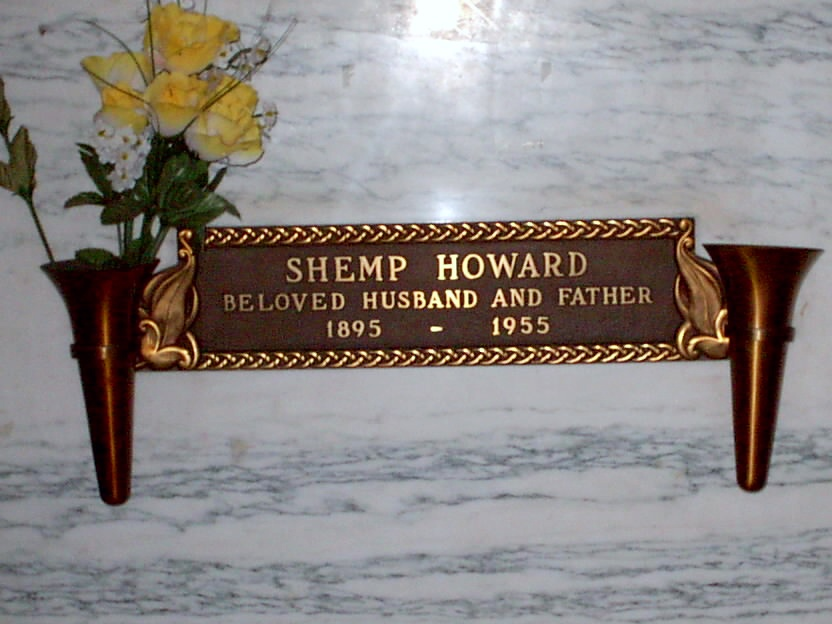
Shemp's indoor mausoleum crypt at Home of Peace Cemetery in East Los Angeles, California

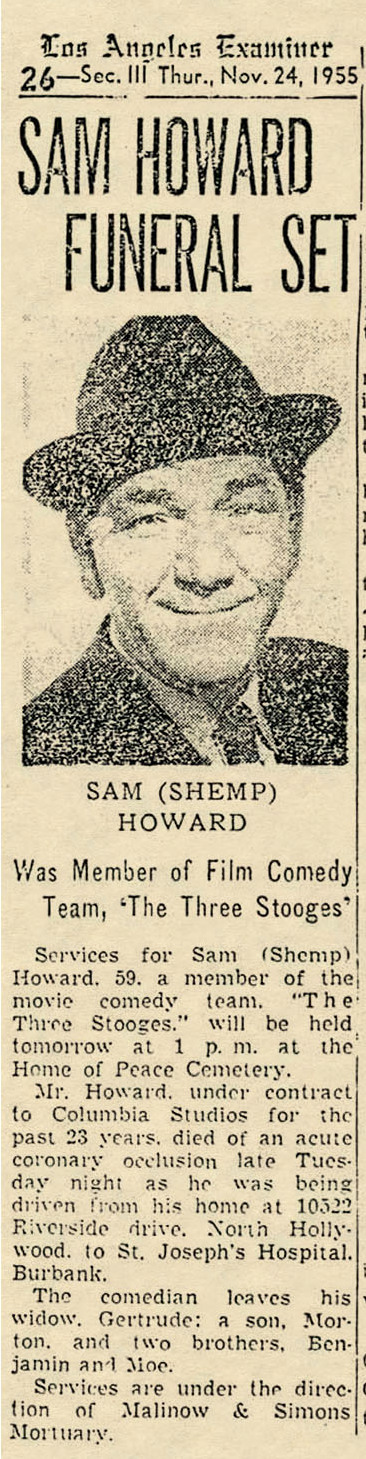
Funeral notice in the Los Angeles Examiner on November 24, 1955

On November 22, 1955, Shemp went out with associates Al Winston and Bobby Silverman to a boxing match, one of Shemp's favorite pastimes, at the Hollywood Legion Stadium. While returning home in a taxi that evening, Shemp died. The cause of death was contemporaneously reported in the press as a coronary event; later family accounts give as a cause of death a massive cerebral hemorrhage. He was 60 years old.

Moe's autobiography gives a death date of November 23, 1955, which became the date cited by other accounts. Much of that book was finished posthumously by his daughter and son-in-law, without confirming some of the details that have since come to light. The Los Angeles County Coroner's death certificate states that Shemp Howard died on Tuesday, November 22, 1955, at 11:35 [PM] PST. Howard's obituary appeared in the November 23 afternoon editions of Los Angeles newspapers, citing the death on the night of November 22.

Shemp is entombed in a crypt within the Corridor of Eternal Life Mausoleum at the Home of Peace Cemetery in East Los Angeles. His younger brother Curly is also interred there, in an outdoor tomb in the Western Jewish Institute section, as well as his parents Solomon and Jennie Horwitz and older brother Benjamin "Jack".

== The "Fake Shemps" ==
Columbia had promised exhibitors eight Three Stooges comedies for 1956, but only four were completed at the time of Shemp Howard's death. To fulfill the contract, producer Jules White manufactured four more shorts "with Shemp" by combining old footage of Howard with new connecting scenes played by a body double (longtime Stooge supporting actor Joe Palma) seen mostly from the back. Palma came to be known by Stooge fans as the "Fake Shemp", a term which director Sam Raimi later coined in reference to any body double replacing an unavailable actor.

These new releases of 1956 are all based on Stooge comedies of 1949. Rumpus in the Harem borrows from Malice in the Palace; Hot Stuff from Fuelin' Around; Commotion on the Ocean from Dunked in the Deep. The best-received and most technically accomplished of the four is Scheming Schemers (1956), combining new footage with recycled clips from three old Stooge shorts: A Plumbing We Will Go (1940), Half-Wits Holiday (1947) and Vagabond Loafers (1949).

== Continued popularity ==
When it was time to renew the Stooges' contract, Columbia hired comedian Joe Besser to replace Shemp. Columbia discontinued filming new Stooge shorts in December 1957 but continued to release them through June 1959. The Stooge shorts were still in demand for kiddie-matinée shows, and their TV revivals boosted the team's popularity to an all-time high. Columbia kept the theatrical series going by reissuing Shemp's Stooge shorts until 1968.

In the television biopic The Three Stooges (2000), Shemp Howard was portrayed by John Kassir.

== Tributes ==
The Three Stooges earned a star on the Hollywood Walk of Fame at 1560 Vine Street on August 30, 1983.

== Filmography ==
Features

- Soup to Nuts (1930)
- Convention Girl (1935)
- Hollywood Round-Up (1937)
- Headin' East (1937)
- Behind Prison Gates (1939)
- Another Thin Man (1939)
- The Lone Wolf Meets a Lady (1939)
- The Leather Pushers (1939)
- Give Us Wings (1939)
- The Bank Dick (1939)
- Murder Over New York (1939)
- Millionaires in Prison (1940)
- The Invisible Woman (1940)
- Six Lessons from Madame La Zonga (1941)
- Buck Privates (1941)
- Hold That Ghost (1941)
- Meet the Chump (1941)
- Road Show (1941)
- Mr. Dynamite (1941)
- The Flame of New Orleans (1941)
- Too Many Blondes (1941)
- In the Navy (1941)
- Tight Shoes (1941)
- San Antonio Rose (1941)
- Hit the Road (1941)
- Cracked Nuts (1941)
- Hellzapoppin' (1941)
- Butch Minds the Baby (1942)
- The Strange Case of Doctor Rx (1942)
- Mississippi Gambler (1942)
- Private Buckaroo (1942)
- Strictly in the Groove (1942)
- Arabian Nights (1942)
- How's About It (1942)
- Pittsburgh (1942)
- Keep 'Em Slugging (1943)
- Crazy House (1943)
- Three of a Kind (1943)
- Moonlight and Cactus (1943)
- Strange Affair (1944)
- Crazy Knights (1944)
- Trouble Chasers (1945)
- The Gentleman Misbehaves (1946)
- One Exciting Week (1946)
- Dangerous Business (1946)
- Blondie Knows Best (1946)
- Africa Screams (1949)

Two Reelers

- Salt Water Daffy (1933)
- Close Relations (1933)
- Paul Revere Jr. (1933)
- Gobs of Fun (1933)
- In the Dough (1933)
- Here Comes Flossie! (1933)
- Howd' Ya Like That? (1934)
- Henry the Ache (1934)
- The Wrong, Wrong Trail (1934)
- Mushrooms (1934)
- The Knife of the Party (1934)
- Everybody Likes Music (1934)
- Pugs and Kisses (1934)
- Very Close Veins (1934)
- Pure Feud (1934)
- Corn on the Cop (1934)
- I Scream (1934)
- Rambling 'Round Radio Row # 7 (Series 2 # 1) (1934)
- Art Trouble (1934)
- My Mummy's Arms (1934)
- Daredevil O'Dare (1934)
- Smoked Hams (1934)
- So You Won't T-T-T-Talk (1934)
- Dizzy & Daffy (1934)
- A Peach of a Pair (1934)
- His First Flame (1935)
- Convention Girl (1935)
- Why Pay Rent? (1935)
- Serves You Right (1935)
- On the Wagon (1935)
- The Officer's Mess (1935)
- While the Cat's Away (1936)
- For the Love of Pete (1936)
- Absorbing Junior (1936)
- Here's Howe (1936)
- Punch and Beauty (1936)
- The Choke's on You (1936)
- The Blonde Bomber (1936)
- Kick Me Again (1937)
- Taking the Count (1937)
- Hollywood Round-Up (1937)
- Headin' East (1937)
- The Leather Pushers (1938)
- Home on the Rage (1938)
- Glove Slingers (1939)
- Money Squawks (1940)
- The Lone Wolf Meets a Lady (1940)
- Boobs in the Woods (1940)
- Pleased to Mitt You (1940)
- Pick a Peck of Plumbers (1944)
- Open Season for Saps (1944)
- Off Again, On Again (1945)
- Where the Pest Begins (1945)
- A Hit with a Miss (1945)
- Mr. Noisy (1946)
- Jiggers, My Wife (1946)
- Society Mugs (1946)
- Bride and Gloom (1947)

with The Three Stooges

- Fright Night (1947)
- Out West (1947)
- Hold That Lion! (1947) (His brother Curly Howard in a cameo)
- Brideless Groom (1947)
- Sing a Song of Six Pants (1947)
- All Gummed Up (1947)
- Shivering Sherlocks (1948)
- Pardon My Clutch (1948)
- Squareheads of the Round Table (1948)
- Fiddlers Three (1948)
- The Hot Scots (1948)
- Heavenly Daze (1948)
- I'm a Monkey's Uncle (1948)
- Mummy's Dummies (1948)
- Crime on Their Hands (1948)
- The Ghost Talks! (1949)
- Who Done It? (1949)
- Hokus Pokus (1949)
- Fuelin' Around (1949)
- Malice in the Palace (1949) (brother Curly Howard's second cameo as a Chef filmed but not used)
- Vagabond Loafers (1949)
- Dunked in the Deep (1949)
- Punchy Cowpunchers (1950)
- Hugs and Mugs (1950)
- Dopey Dicks (1950)
- Love at First Bite (1950)
- Self-Made Maids (1950)
- Three Hams on Rye (1950)
- Studio Stoops (1950)
- Slaphappy Sleuths (1950)
- A Snitch in Time (1950)
- Three Arabian Nuts (1951)
- Baby Sitters Jitters (1951)
- Don't Throw That Knife (1951)
- Scrambled Brains (1951)
- Merry Mavericks (1951)
- The Tooth Will Out (1951)
- Hula-La-La (1951)
- Pest Man Wins (1951)
- Gold Raiders (1951)
- A Missed Fortune (1952)
- Listen, Judge (1952)
- Corny Casanovas (1952)
- He Cooked His Goose (1952)
- Gents in a Jam (1952)
- Three Dark Horses (1952)
- Cuckoo on a Choo Choo (1952)
- Up in Daisy's Penthouse (1953)
- Booty and the Beast (1953)
- Loose Loot (1953)
- Tricky Dicks (1953)
- Spooks! (1953) (first flat widescreen short)
- Pardon My Backfire (1953)
- Rip, Sew and Stitch (1953)
- Bubble Trouble (1953)
- Goof on the Roof (1953)
- Income Tax Sappy (1954)
- Musty Musketeers (1954)
- Pals and Gals (1954)
- Knutzy Knights (1954)
- Shot in the Frontier (1954)
- Scotched in Scotland (1954)
- Fling in the Ring (1955)
- Of Cash and Hash (1955)
- Gypped in the Penthouse (1955)
- Bedlam in Paradise (1955)
- Stone Age Romeos (1955)
- Wham-Bam-Slam! (1955)
- Hot Ice (1955)
- Blunder Boys (1955)
- Husbands Beware (1956) (posthumous release)
- Creeps (1956) (posthumous release)
- Flagpole Jitters (1956) (posthumous release)
- For Crimin' Out Loud (1956) (posthumous release)
- Rumpus in the Harem (1956) (archive footage, posthumous release)
- Hot Stuff (1956) (archive footage, posthumous release)
- Scheming Schemers (1956) (archive footage, posthumous release)
- Commotion on the Ocean (1956) (archive footage, posthumous release, and final starring role)
