= Joe Palma =

American actor (1905–1994)

- Joe Palma in Fiddlers Three 1948
- Born: Joseph Provenzano; March 17, 1905; New York City, New York, U.S.
- Died: August 14, 1994 (aged 89); Poway, California, U.S.
- Occupation: Actor
- Years active: 1937–1968
- Spouse: Marjorie Ann Ries

Joe Palma (born Joseph Provenzano; March 17, 1905 – August 14, 1994) was an American film actor. Palma appeared in over 120 films between 1937 and 1968. He was well known as a supporting player for The Three Stooges and his brief tenure as a body double to member Shemp Howard for four shorts produced after Shemp's death, which led to the coining of the term "Fake Shemp".

== Early years ==
Palma was born Joseph Provenzano in New York City to an Italian-American family, and worked as a mortician in the Provenzano Funeral Home, owned by his parents. Eventually, Hollywood called, and Palma headed west. He joined the stock company at Columbia Pictures in 1937, and played scores of bit parts over 30 years.

With his lean build, brushed-back hair, and unassuming appearance, Joe Palma almost always played incidental roles. He was usually in the background, and at most, he would be given only a few lines of dialogue. In the 1945 Three Stooges comedy Beer Barrel Polecats, for instance, Palma plays an angry convict who dares Curly Howard to punch him in the nose.

Palma can be glimpsed in a variety of movies, including crime dramas, musical comedies, costume epics, westerns, serials and two-reel comedies, in roles such as:

- a railroad brakeman picking up runaway Scotty Beckett in The Jolson Story
- a plainclothes detective making a positive identification in the Jean Porter musical Little Miss Broadway
- a bandit defying authority in the Three Stooges' Guns a Poppin
- a waiter in Sam Katzman's production Rock Around the Clock

Palma's largest speaking role is probably in the Schilling & Lane short Training for Trouble, in which Palma attempts a Jewish dialect: "This is Goldstein, Goldberg, Goldblatt and O'Brien, booking agents. O'Brien speaking." (A gag borrowed from the Stooges' A Pain in the Pullman.)

== "Fake Shemp" ==
Today, Palma is best known as Shemp Howard's posthumous double. In 1955, Three Stooges member Shemp Howard died of a sudden heart attack. At the time, the Stooges still had four short films left to deliver on their annual contract with Columbia Pictures. By 1955, budget cuts had forced them to utilize stock footage from previous shorts as a matter of survival. As a result, the Stooges managed to complete the four films without Shemp. To do this, Palma was made up to resemble the late Stooge, complete with wig, and would be filmed only from the back or side. On occasion, Palma was required to add a brief line of dialogue or sound (most notably in Hot Stuff). The few new shots Palma appeared in were then edited together with the recycled footage containing the real Shemp, and "new" films were born. Palma would remain a supporting cast member in The Three Stooges shorts throughout Joe Besser's short run as the third stooge.

== Later years ==
Palma spent his last years in the entertainment industry as an assistant to Jack Lemmon. He appears as "Mr. Palma", the mailman, in Lemmon's 1964 Columbia comedy Good Neighbor Sam. His final film appearance was as a butcher in Lemmon's 1968 Paramount film The Odd Couple.

He died of natural causes on August 14, 1994, at age 89.

== Selected filmography ==
- Goofs and Saddles (1937)
- Adventure in Sahara (1938)
- Blondie Brings Up Baby (1939)
- From Nurse to Worse (1940)
- A Blitz on the Fritz (1943)
- Louisiana Hayride (1944)
- Sailor's Holiday (1944)
- Pick a Peck of Plumbers (1944)
- Boston Blackie Booked on Suspicion (1945)
- If a Body Meets a Body (1945)
- A Hit with a Miss (1945)
- The Bells of St. Mary's (1945)
- Beer Barrel Polecats (1946)
- Three Loan Wolves (1946)
- Three Little Pirates (1946)
- Boston Blackie and the Law (1946)
- Sing a Song of Six Pants (1947)
- Shivering Sherlocks (1948)
- Squareheads of the Round Table (1948)
- Fiddlers Three (1948)
- I'm a Monkey's Uncle (1948)
- Malice in the Palace (1949)
- Punchy Cowpunchers (1950)
- Hugs and Mugs (1950)
- Fraidy Cat (1951)
- Income Tax Sappy (1954)
- Musty Musketeers (1954)
- Pals and Gals (1954)
- Knutzy Knights (1954)
- Shot in the Frontier (1954)
- Fling in the Ring (1955)
- Stone Age Romeos (1955) [archival footage]
- Hook a Crook (1955)
- Rumpus in the Harem (1956)
- Hot Stuff (1956)
- Scheming Schemers (1956)
- Commotion on the Ocean (1956)
- Hoofs and Goofs (1957)
- Guns a Poppin (1957)
- Outer Space Jitters (1957)
- Fifi Blows Her Top (1958)
- Flying Saucer Daffy (1958)
- Sappy Bull Fighters (1959)
- Good Neighbor Sam (1964)
- The Great Race (1965)
- The Odd Couple (1968)
