= The Bandit of Sherwood Forest =

1946 film by Henry Levin, George Sherman

- Directed by: Henry Levin; George Sherman
- Written by: Wilfred H. Petitt; Melvin Levy
- Story by: Paul A. Castleton & Wilfred H. Petitt
- Based on: Novel Son of Robin Hood by Paul A. Castleton
- Produced by: Leonard S. Picker; Clifford Sanforth
- Starring: Cornel Wilde; Anita Louise; Jill Esmond; Edgar Buchanan
- Cinematography: Tony Gaudio; William Snyder; George B. Meehan
- Edited by: Richard Fantl
- Music by: Hugo Friedhofer
- Production company: Columbia Pictures
- Distributed by: Columbia Pictures
- Release date: February 21, 1946
- Running time: 86 minutes
- Country: United States
- Language: English
- Budget: >$1 million
- Box office: $3 million (US rentals); 3,410,235 admissions (France)

The Bandit of Sherwood Forest is a 1946 American Technicolor adventure film directed by Henry Levin & George Sherman and starring Cornel Wilde, Anita Louise, Jill Esmond and Edgar Buchanan.

== Plot ==
Robin Hood's son (Cornel Wilde) returns to save Magna Carta, flirt with Lady Catherine (Anita Louise) and protect a boy king.

== Cast ==
- Anita Louise as Lady Catherine Maitland
- Jill Esmond as the Queen Mother
- Edgar Buchanan as Friar Tuck
- Cornel Wilde as Robert of Nottingham
- Henry Daniell as the Regent, William of Pembroke
- George Macready as Fitz-Herbert
- Russell Hicks as Robin Hood, Earl of Huntingdon
- John Abbott as Will Scarlet
- Lloyd Corrigan as the Sheriff of Nottingham
- Eva Moore as Mother Meg
- Ray Teal as Little John
- Leslie Denison as Allan-A-Dale
- Ian Wolfe as Lord Mortimer
- Maurice Tauzin as The King
- Miles Mander as Lord Warrick
- Mark Roberts as Robin Hood's Man
- Harry Cording as Prioress Guard (uncredited)
- Harry Wilson as Outlaw (uncredited)

== Production ==
The film is based on a 1941 novel, Son of Robin Hood by Paul Castleton. In 1941, Don "Red" Barry was attached to star in a serial called The Son of Robin Hood but it was not made.

Producer Clifford Sanforth said he got the idea to make the film when his little son saw The Adventures of Robin Hood (1938) and asked his father whether Robin Hood had a son. Sanforth tracked down and bought the film rights to the novel. In April 1944 Sanforth had intention to make a series of films about the son of Robin Hood for Republic Pictures starring archer Howard Hill.

In early 1945 the project moved to Columbia Pictures where Sanforth was to produce with Leonard Picker. MGM objected to the title The Son of Robin Hood claiming they had the rights to use the words "Robin Hood" as they had bought screen rights to an operetta of that name by Reginald de Koven. This resulted in Columbia deciding to use the title The Bandit of Sherwood Forest.

The casting of Cornel Wilde and Anita Louise was announced in March 1945 and filming began in April.

The film featured the first cinematic use of helicopter-mounted cameras used, during the scene of the storming of the castle.

== Reception ==
=== Critical reception ===
Variety wrote: "There is considerable ineptness in writing, production and direction but it still stands up as okay escapist film fare for the not-too-critical. There is a concentration of chases and 'they-went-thata-way' flavor about the doings that hints at the western feature training of producers and directors. Wilde is properly swashbuckling as the hero, and probably had himself a time enacting the dare-and-do". The New York Times wrote: "Cornel Wilde is dashing and flashes a toothsome smile as the virtuous "bandit" of Sherwood and Anita Louise is beautiful, though perhaps a bit more coquettish than a maiden fair should be. All the rest, including Russel Hicks as the elder Robert, pitch into their roles with picturesque extravagance. The Bandit of Sherwood Forest is the kind of entertainment that makes one wish one could be a boy again—if only for an hour and a half".

=== Box office ===
The film was a sizable box office hit. It earned over $3 million in the US and was the 14th most popular film of the year in France in 1948.

== Legacy ==
The sets built for the film were reused in the Three Stooges shorts Squareheads of the Round Table, Fiddlers Three, and The Hot Scots, and again for the 1948 film The Prince of Thieves.

== See also ==
- List of films and television series featuring Robin Hood
