= Malice in the Palace =

1949 film by Jules White

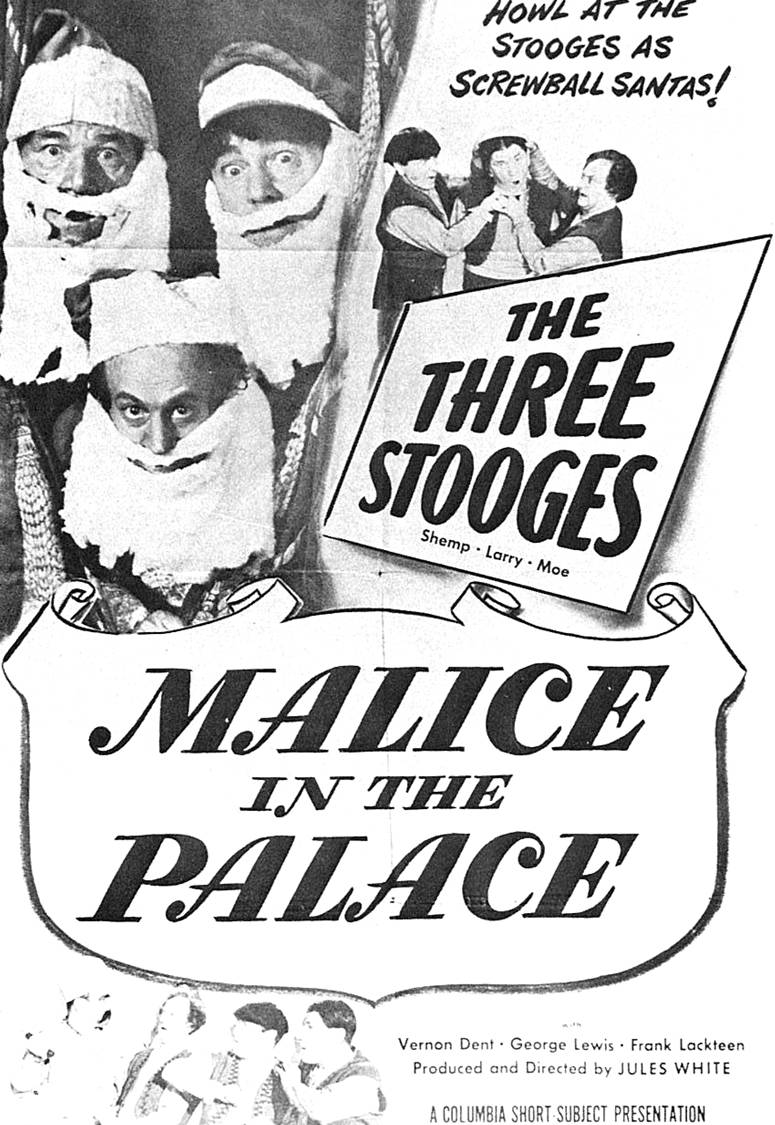
- Directed by: Jules White
- Written by: Felix Adler
- Produced by: Jules White
- Starring: Moe Howard; Larry Fine; Shemp Howard; Vernon Dent; George J. Lewis; Frank Lackteen; Everett Brown; Johnny Kascier; Joe Palma
- Cinematography: Vincent J. Farrar
- Edited by: Edwin Bryant
- Distributed by: Columbia Pictures
- Release date: September 1, 1949
- Running time: 16:15
- Country: United States
- Language: English

Malice in the Palace is a 1949 short subject directed by Jules White starring the American slapstick comedy team The Three Stooges (Moe Howard, Larry Fine and Shemp Howard). It is the 117th entry in the series released by Columbia Pictures starring the comedians, who released 190 shorts for the studio between 1934 and 1959.

== Plot ==
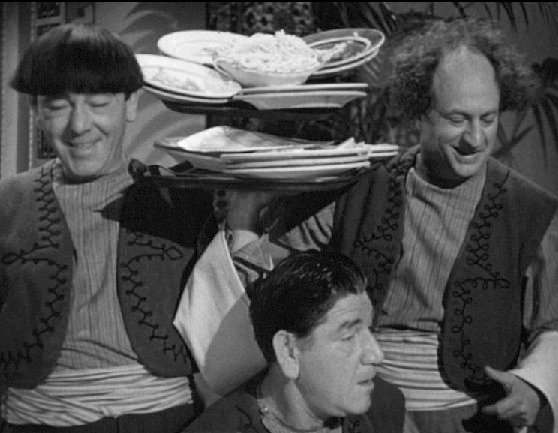
Shemp: "Boy, if I hadn't ducked, we'd have collided sure. What a narrow escape!"

The Stooges operate a Middle Eastern restaurant called Cafe Casbah Bah, where they become entangled in a string of mishaps while serving patrons Hassan ben Sober and Ginna Rumma. A culinary incident ensues when spaghetti inadvertently splatters onto the patrons' faces, prompting the Stooges to offer a replacement meal of rabbit and hot dogs. Their efforts are further complicated by the presence of a stray cat and dog, leading to mistaken impressions about the meal's ingredients.

Unbeknownst to the Stooges, their encounter with Sober and Rumma conceals a sinister plot. The patrons are revealed to be thieves aiming to pilfer a valuable diamond from the tomb of King Rootintootin. Despite their unwitting involvement, the Stooges become aware of the scheme and endeavor to thwart it, ultimately reclaiming the diamond from the Emir of Shmow's possession.

Disguised as a trio of Santa Clauses, the Stooges infiltrate the Emir's palace and successfully retrieve the diamond. However, their escape is hindered by a formidable guardian, necessitating the utilization of cunning and agility to evade capture.

== Cast ==
=== Credited ===
- Moe Howard as Moe
- Larry Fine as Larry
- Shemp Howard as Shemp
- Vernon Dent as Hassan Ben Sober
- George J. Lewis as Ghinna Rumma
- Frank Lackteen as Haffa Dalla

=== Uncredited ===
- Everett Brown as Nubian Guard
- Johnny Kascier as Emir of Shmow
- Joe Palma as Guard Outside Palace
- Curly Howard as Chef (scene deleted)

== Production notes ==
Malice in the Palace was filmed on June 8–11, 1948. It was remade in 1956 as Rumpus in the Harem, using ample stock footage from the original. Footage was reused from Wee Wee Monsieur when the Stooges arrive at a palace disguised as Santa Clauses in a sleigh being pulled by a horse wearing reindeer antlers.

=== Curly Howard's cameo ===
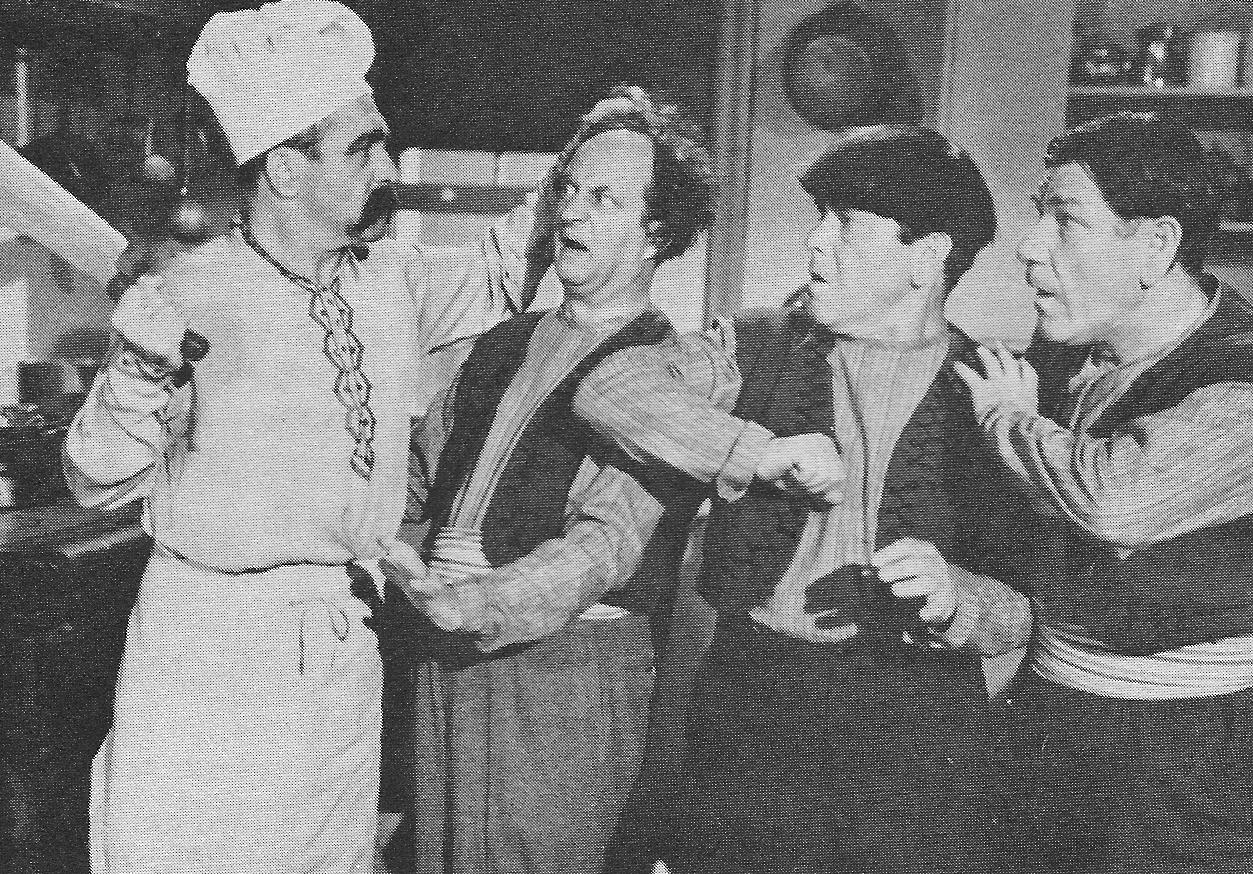
A thinner Curly (with a full head of hair and false handlebar mustache) as the Chef in Malice in the Palace. His scene was deleted from the final release.

According to The Three Stooges Journal, a part was written for Former Stooge Curly Howard after his brief cameo in 1947's Hold That Lion!. The lobby card photo noticeably features a slim, mustachioed Curly as an angry chef. However, his illness caused his scenes to be cut (another story is that Moe Howard decided that "The Four Stooges" could not be sustained). A scene closely resembling the lobby card is in the finished film (with Hassan ben Sober in Curly's stead); ultimately Larry assumed the role as the chef. This was the last time Curly was considered for a performance with the trio until his death in 1952.

== Copyright status ==
Malice in the Palace is one of four Columbia Stooge shorts that fell into the public domain after their copyright expired in 1964, the other three being Sing a Song of Six Pants, Brideless Groom (both 1947), and Disorder in the Court (1936). As such, these four shorts frequently appear on budget VHS and DVD compilations.

== In popular culture ==
Watch Malice in the Palace here

Malice in the Palace was one of five Stooge films included in the TBS 1995 Halloween special The Three Stooges Fright Night along with Spooks (1953), If a Body Meets a Body (1945), We Want Our Mummy (1939), and The Hot Scots (1948).

The 2004 NBA brawl between the Indiana Pacers and the Detroit Pistons has come to be known as the Malice at the Palace, a play on the title of this short and a reference to the fact that the event happened at The Palace of Auburn Hills.

This short was seen in a movie theater in The Garbage Pail Kids Movie.

The routine where Hassan ben Sober and Ginna Rumma believe they are eating real rabbit and dog also appeared in the Abbott and Costello film The Naughty Nineties four years earlier.

== See also ==
- Public domain film
- List of American films of 1949
- List of films in the public domain in the United States
