= Hot Stuff (1956 film) =

1956 short film by Jules White

- Directed by: Jules White; Edward Bernds (stock footage)
- Screenplay by: Felix Adler
- Story by: Elwood Ullman
- Produced by: Jules White
- Starring: Moe Howard; Larry Fine; Shemp Howard; Joe Palma; Emil Sitka; Gene Roth; Connie Cezon; Evelyn Lovequist; Christine McIntyre; Vernon Dent; Philip Van Zandt; Jacques O'Mahoney; Andri Pola; Harold Brauer; Blackie Whiteford
- Cinematography: Ray Cory
- Edited by: Harold White
- Distributed by: Columbia Pictures
- Release date: September 6, 1956 (U.S.)
- Running time: 15:55
- Country: United States
- Language: English

Hot Stuff is a 1956 short subject directed by Jules White starring American slapstick comedy team The Three Stooges (Moe Howard, Larry Fine and Shemp Howard). It is the 172nd entry in the series released by Columbia Pictures starring the comedians, who released 190 shorts for the studio between 1934 and 1959.

== Plot ==
The Stooges assume the covert identities of secret agents, deployed on an undercover mission within the domicile of Professor Sneed and his daughter. Professor Sneed, engaged in clandestine research for the government, is developing rocket fuel of strategic significance. The incipient conflict is catalyzed by the clandestine surveillance conducted by Captain Rork of the State of Anemia, who harbors intentions of apprehending the professor for nefarious purposes.

An inadvertent case of mistaken identity ensues, as Rork and his cohorts erroneously seize the Stooges under the erroneous belief that Larry is the esteemed professor. Subsequent complications arise when the captives are compelled to replicate the rocket fuel formula, an endeavor fraught with challenges. The escalating tension reaches its zenith with the eventual capture of the real Professor Sneed and his daughter, incarcerated pending the divulgence of the coveted formula.

A decisive turn of events transpires as the Stooges ingeniously orchestrate their escape, subduing Rork and liberating themselves and their fellow captives from imprisonment. Employing a concoction of ersatz fuel as a catalyst, the Stooges effectuate a hasty retreat, leaving a chaotic aftermath in their wake. The resultant exhaust discharge, propelled with considerable force, induces the disrobing of the Anemia soldiers.

== Cast ==
=== Credited ===
- Moe Howard as Moe
- Larry Fine as Larry
- Shemp Howard as Shemp (stock footage)
- Emil Sitka as Professor Sneed (stock footage)
- Christine McIntyre as Hazel Sneed (stock footage)
- Philip Van Zandt as Captain Rork

=== Uncredited ===
- Joe Palma as Shemp (new footage)
- Gene Roth as Anemian Ambassador
- Connie Cezon as Uranian officer
- Evelyn Lovequist as Uranian officer
- Suzanne Ridgeway as Woman in hallway
- Vernon Dent as Anemian General (stock footage)
- Jacques O'Mahoney as Cell Guard (stock footage)
- Hans Schumm as Colonel Cluttz (stock footage)
- Harold Brauer as Leon (stock footage)
- Blackie Whiteford as Anemian soldier (stock footage)
- Jimmy Aubrey as Anemian soldier (stock footage)

== Production notes ==
The short is a remake of 1949's Fuelin' Around, using ample stock footage. Hot Stuff was one of four shorts filmed in the wake of Shemp Howard's death using recycled footage and a stand-in.

=== "Fake Shemp" ===
As Shemp Howard had already died, for his last four films (Rumpus in the Harem, Hot Stuff, Scheming Schemers and Commotion on the Ocean), Columbia utilized supporting actor Joe Palma to be Shemp's double. Even though the last four shorts were remakes of earlier Shemp efforts, Palma's services were needed to link what few new scenes were filmed to the older stock footage.

For Hot Stuff, Palma is seen twice. The first time occurs when the Stooges, disguised in beards, are trolling through office hallways. Moe instructs Shemp to pursue a suspicious looking girl, to which Palma grunts "Right!" He then walks off-camera, allowing Moe and Larry to finish the scene by themselves. This is the only time Palma allowed his face to be seen on-camera. As he was purposely wearing a beard, his face is successfully concealed. Later, Palma is seen from the back while the boys are locked in the laboratory. Palma attempts to imitate Shemp's famed cry of "Heep, heep, heep!". Again, Moe directs Shemp, this time to guard the door. Palma obliges, mutters a few additional "Heep, heep, heeps!," and conveniently hides behind the door. This was one of the few times during his tenure as Shemp's double that Palma was required to speak without the aid of dubbing.

== See also ==
- List of American films of 1956
