= Larry Fine =

American comedian and actor (1902–1975)

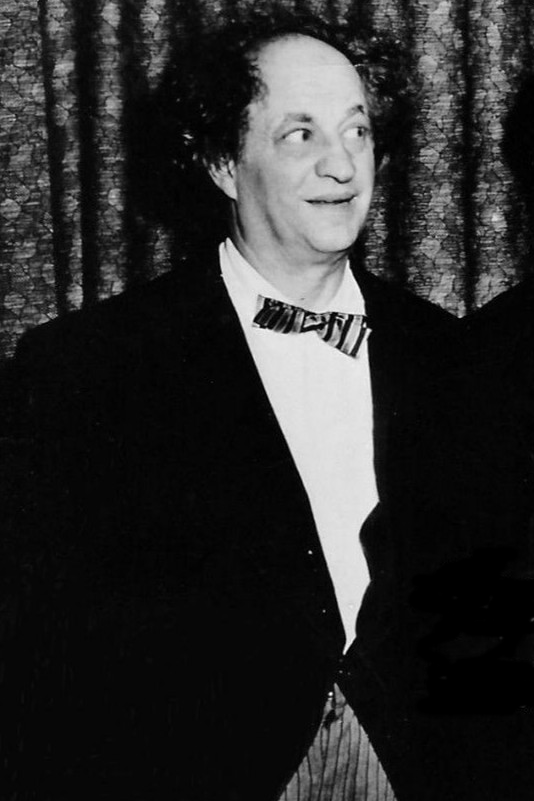
- Fine in 1962
- Born: Louis Feinberg; October 4, 1902; Philadelphia, Pennsylvania, U.S.
- Died: January 24, 1975 (aged 72); Los Angeles, California, U.S.
- Resting place: Forest Lawn Memorial Park; Glendale, California, U.S.
- Occupations: Actor; comedian; musician
- Years active: 1922–1970
- Spouse: Mabel Haney (m. 1926; died 1967)
- Children: 2
- Website: threestooges.com

Larry Fine (born Louis Feinberg; October 4, 1902 – January 24, 1975) was an American actor, comedian and musician. He is best known as a member of the comedy act the Three Stooges and was often called "The Middle Stooge".

== Early life ==
Fine was born Louis Feinberg to a Russian Jewish family at 3rd and South Street in Philadelphia, Pennsylvania, on October 4, 1902. Several sources erroneously listed his birthday as October 5. He was the eldest of four children. His father, Joseph Feinberg, and mother, Fanny Lieberman, owned a watch repair and jewelry shop.

In his early childhood, Fine's arm was accidentally burned with hydrochloric acid that his father used to test jewelry for its gold content. Fine had picked up the bottle and, mistaking it for a beverage, raised it to his lips when his father noticed and knocked it out of his hand, accidentally splashing the acid on his son's forearm, causing extensive damage to it.

Fine's parents later gave him violin lessons to help strengthen the damaged muscles in his forearm. He became so proficient that his parents wanted to send him to a European music conservatory, but the plan was thwarted by the outbreak of World War I. Fine later played the violin in the Stooge films. To further strengthen his damaged arm, Fine took up boxing in his teens, winning one professional bout. His father was opposed to Larry's fighting in public and put an end to his brief boxing career.

== Acting career ==
=== Vaudeville ===
At an early age, Fine started performing as a violinist in vaudeville. In 1928, while serving as the master of ceremonies at Rainbo Gardens in Chicago, Fine met Shemp Howard and Ted Healy, who were performing in the Shubert Brothers' A Night in Spain. Since Howard was leaving the play for a few months, they asked him to be a replacement "stooge". Fine joined Ted's other stooges, Bobby Pinkus and Sam "Moody" Braun. Howard returned in September 1928 to finish Spain's national tour.

In early 1929, Healy signed a contract to perform in the Shuberts' new revue A Night in Venice. Healy brought Fine, Shemp Howard, and Moe Howard together for the first time as a trio. "Moe, Larry, and Shemp", along with Fred Sanborn, appeared in Venice from 1929 through March 1930. Fine, Shemp Howard and Moe Howard toured with three different titles: "Ted Healy & His Racketeers", "Ted Healy and his Southern Gentlemen", and "Ted Healy and His Three Lost Souls" before going to Hollywood in the summer to film Fox Studio's Soup to Nuts (1930).

Fine and the Howard brothers broke up with Healy after Soup to Nuts and toured as "Howard, Fine, and Howard: Three Lost Soles" from the fall of 1930 to the summer of 1932. In July 1932, Fine and Moe Howard teamed up with Healy again, adding Moe's youngest brother Jerome "Curly" Howard to the group. The new lineup premiered at RKO Palace Theatre in Cleveland on August 27, 1932. Shemp Howard split off to pursue a solo career.

=== Larry's hair ===
Fine was easily recognized in the Stooge features by his large top bald spot with thick, bushy, curly auburn hair around the sides and back; Moe called him "Porcupine". According to rumor, his trademark hairstyle had its origin from his first meeting with Healy in which Fine had just wet his hair in a sink, with it drying oddly as they talked. Healy encouraged Fine to keep the hairstyle. However, in a 1960 interview, Fine revealed it was J. J. Shubert who encouraged him to keep the hairstyle, not Healy, after Fine had opened the door to him having just shampooed his hair.

=== Three Stooges features ===
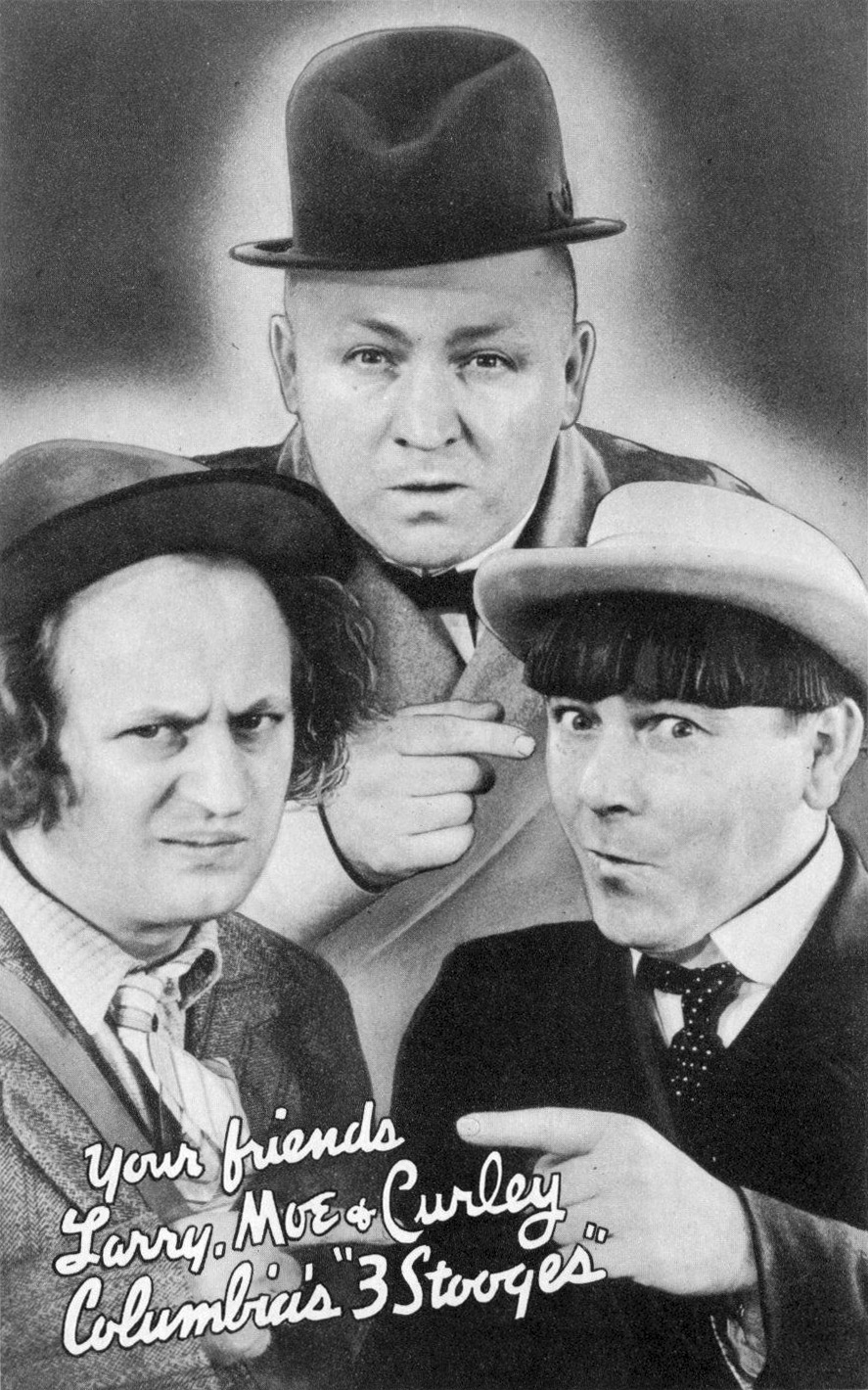
Fine, Curly Howard, and Moe Howard in 1937

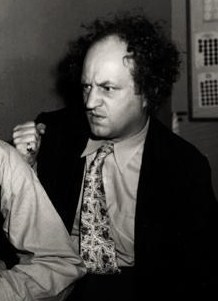
Fine in Sing a Song of Six Pants in 1947

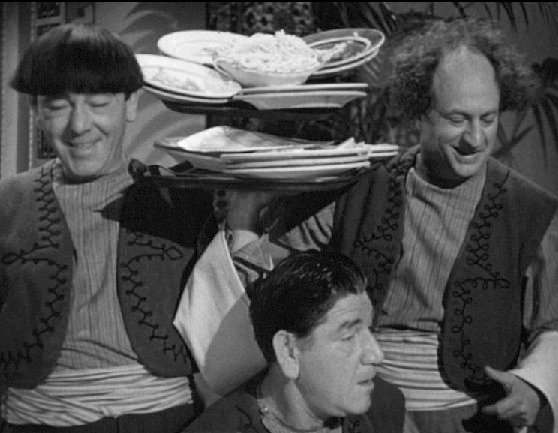
Fine (right) with Moe Howard and his brother Shemp Howard in Malice in the Palace in 1949

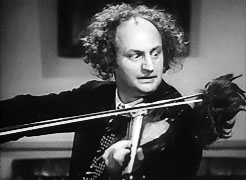
Fine in Disorder in the Court in 1936

Beginning in 1934, The Three Stooges set about making 206 short films and several features, their most prolific period starring Fine, Moe Howard, and Curly Howard. Their career with Healy was marked by disputes over pay, film contracts, and Healy's drinking and verbal abuse. Fine and the Howard brothers finally left Healy for good in 1934.

In films from the Curly era, the Larry character did more reacting than acting, staying in the background and serving as the voice of reason in contrast to the zany antics of Moe and Curly. He was a surrealistic foil and the middle ground between Moe's gruffly "bossy" and Curly's childish personae. Like the other Stooges, Larry was often on the receiving end of Moe's abuse. His reasonableness was the perfect foil to Moe's brusque bluntness and Curly's or Shemp's boyish immaturity, but Larry sometimes proposed something impossible or illogical and was quickly put down verbally and physically by Moe, who often pulled a handful of hair out of Larry's head. Film critic Leonard Maltin wrote, "Larry is the least distinctive character of the trio, but he adds a pleasing touch by siding with either Moe or Curly, depending on the situation, thereby enabling him to show moments of lucidity as well as lunacy."

After Curly suffered a debilitating stroke in May 1946, Shemp replaced him in the act. The Shemp era marked a period of increased onscreen presence for Larry, who had been relegated to a background role during the Curly era. Upon Shemp's return, he was allotted equal onscreen time, even becoming the focus of several films, in particular, Fuelin' Around (1949) and He Cooked His Goose (1952).

On November 22, 1955, Shemp died of a cerebral hemorrhage. Joe Palma doubled for Shemp in the next four films; then Joe Besser succeeded him as the third Stooge in 1956. After Columbia Pictures closed its comedy-shorts department at the end of 1957, Joe DeRita replaced Besser.

In the earliest Stooge films, Larry frequently indulged in utterly nutty behavior. Fine livened scenes up with improvised remarks or ridiculous actions. In the hospital spoof Men in Black (1934), Larry, dressed as a surgeon and wielding a large kitchen knife, chortles: "Let's plug him... and see if he's ripe!" In Disorder in the Court (1936), a tense courtroom scene is interrupted by Larry breaking into a wild Tarzan yell. Of course, after each of his outbursts, Moe would gruffly put him down. According to Fine's brother, Fine developed a callus on one side of his face from being slapped so often by Moe.

Larry's goofiness has been described as an extension of Fine's own relaxed personality. Director Charles Lamont recalled: "Larry was a nut. He was the kind of guy who always said anything. He was a yapper." Writer-director Edward Bernds remembered that Fine's suggestions for the scripts were often "flaky", but occasionally contained good comic ideas.

The Three Stooges became a big hit on television in 1959 when Columbia Pictures released a batch of their films, whose popularity brought them to a new audience and revitalized their careers.

== Personal life ==
Fine met his wife, Mabel Haney, in 1922, when both were working in vaudeville. They married in 1926. The couple had a busy social life.

Fine was called a "yes man" since he was always so agreeable. His devil-may-care personality carried over to the world of finance. He was a terrible businessman and spent his money as soon as he earned it. He had a significant gambling addiction, leading him to gamble his money away at racetracks or high-stakes gin rummy games. In an interview, Fine admitted that he often gave money to actors who needed help and never asked to be repaid. As Joe Besser and director Edward Bernds recalled, because of his constant free-spending and gambling, Fine was almost forced into bankruptcy when Columbia stopped filming Three Stooges shorts in December 1957.

Because of his profligate ways and Mabel's dislike for housekeeping, Larry and his family lived in hotels—first the President Hotel in Atlantic City, New Jersey, where his daughter Phyllis was raised, then the Hollywood Knickerbocker Hotel. He did not own a house until the late 1940s, when he purchased one in the Los Feliz area of Los Angeles, California.

On May 30, 1967, Mabel died of an unexpected heart attack at age 63. Larry was on the road and about to take the stage for a live show at Rocky Point Amusement Park in Warwick, Rhode Island, when he heard the news. He immediately flew home to California, leaving the other two Stooges to improvise their remaining shows at the park.

Mabel's death came five and a half years after the death of their only son, John, in a car crash on November 17, 1961, at age 24. Their daughter, Phyllis, died of cancer on April 3, 1989, aged 60. Phyllis's husband, Don Lamond, was a noted television personality in Los Angeles, best known for hosting the Stooges shorts on KTTV for many years; their son (Larry's grandson) Eric Lamond represented the family in the Stooges' holding company (C3 Entertainment) until his death in 2021.

Fine is sometimes erroneously reported to be the father of sportscaster Warner Wolf, who is the son of Jack Wolf, one of several other "stooges" who played in Ted Healy's vaudeville act at one time or another.

During filming of The Three Stooges Meet Hercules (1962), Fine was diagnosed with Type 2 diabetes during a brief hospital stay after sustaining an injury.

== Final acting years and death ==
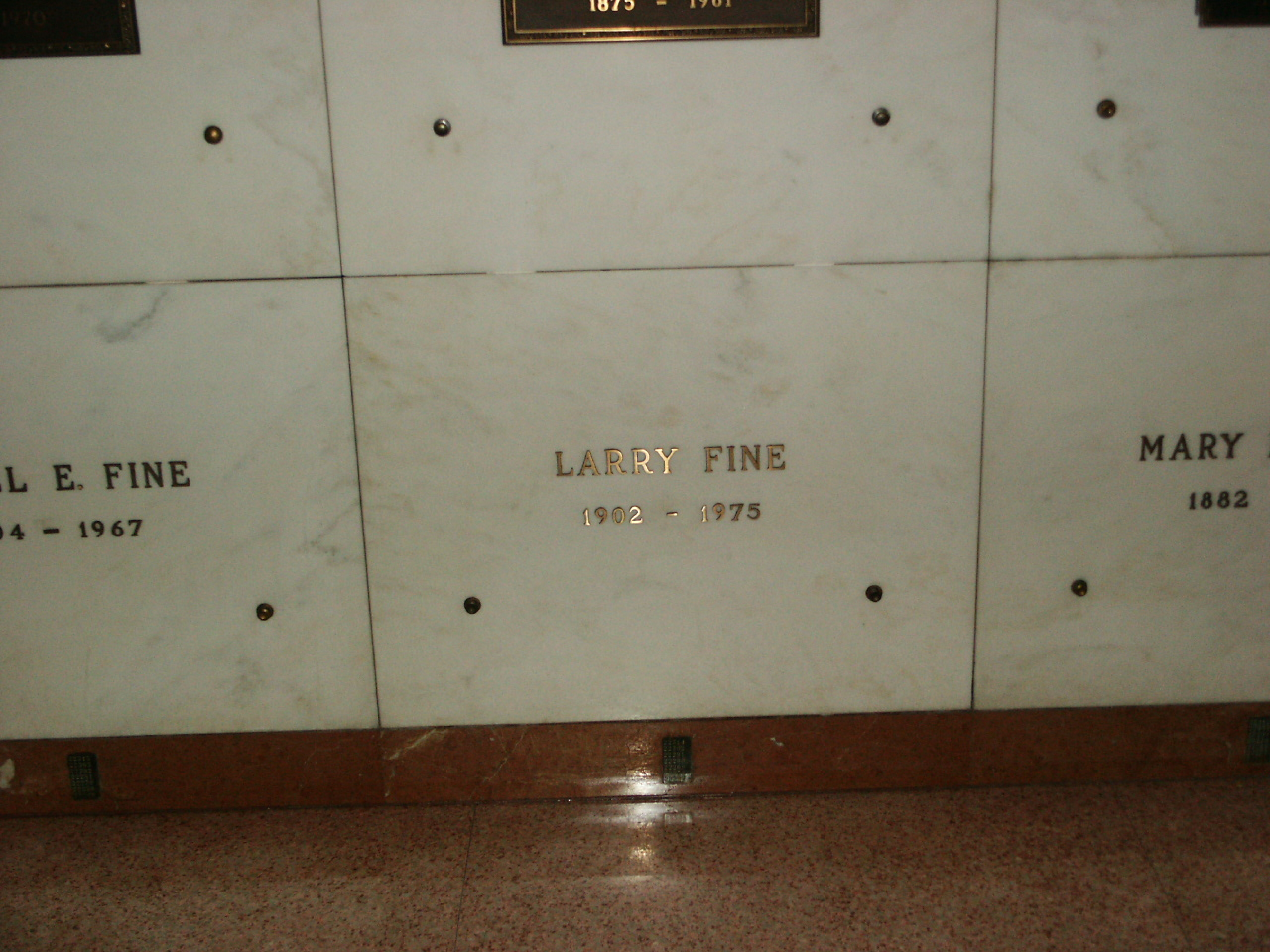
Fine's indoor mausoleum crypt at Forest Lawn Memorial Park Cemetery in Glendale, California

In 1965, Fine, Moe Howard, and Joe DeRita started a new TV comedy show, The New 3 Stooges, a mixture of live and animated segments. The show produced good ratings, but the men were too old to do slapstick comedy well. Fine began showing signs of mental impairment, such as trouble delivering his lines.

A few years later, the men started working on Kook's Tour, a new TV series. On January 9, 1970, Fine suffered a debilitating stroke that paralyzed the left side of his body, which marked the end of his performing career. Producer Norman Maurer subsequently re-edited the footage into a feature-length film, with new footage of Moe Howard introducing the premise.

Fine eventually moved to the Motion Picture Country House, an industry retirement community in Woodland Hills, where he spent his remaining years, and used a wheelchair during the last five. Even in his paralyzed state, Fine did what he could to entertain the other patients, and completed his "as told to" autobiography Stroke of Luck. He also received visits from Moe Howard. Fine remained accessible to Stooge fans, regularly hosting them despite his disability. When asked if spending his life as a Stooge was enjoyable, he answered, "it wasn't fun: it was work—but it paid off good, so I enjoyed it."

Like Curly Howard, Fine suffered several additional strokes before his death on January 24, 1975, at the nursing home in Woodland Hills, aged 72. He is interred with his wife and son in a crypt at Glendale's Forest Lawn Memorial Park Cemetery in the Freedom Mausoleum, Sanctuary of Liberation. Moe died three months later.

== Legacy ==
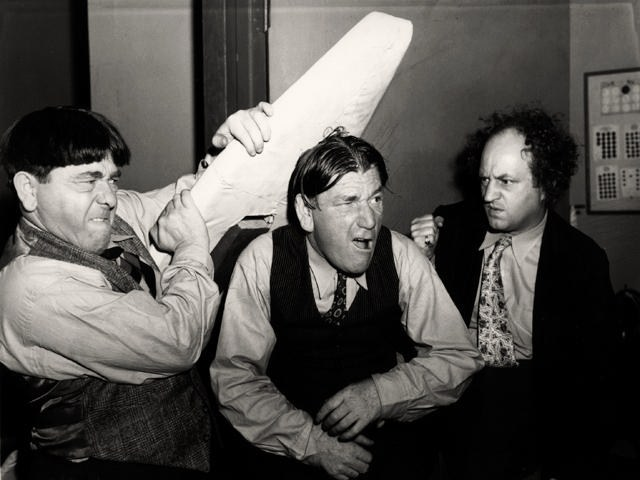
Moe Howard, his brother Shemp Howard, and Fine in Sing a Song of Six Pants in 1947

- The Three Stooges have a star on the Hollywood Walk of Fame in honor of their contributions to the motion-pictures industry at 1560 Vine Street in Hollywood, dedicated on August 30, 1983, with ex-stooge Joe Besser in attendance.
- The voice of Stimpy from The Ren & Stimpy Show was modeled after an "amped up" version of Fine, according to Stimpy's voice actor Billy West.
- In the 2000 made-for-TV movie, Fine was played by Evan Handler.
- In a 2004 New Yorker feature on the Farrelly Brothers' attempt to write a script for a new Three Stooges movie, Peter Farrelly offered his theory of Stooge appreciation: “Growing up, first you watched Curly, then Moe, and then your eyes got to Larry. He’s the reactor, the most vulnerable. Five to 14, Curly; 14 to 21, Moe. Anyone out of college, if you’re not looking at Larry, you don’t have a good brain.”
- A large mural of Fine by Philadelphia artist David McShane appears on a wall at the intersection of Third and South Streets, near his birthplace in Philadelphia. The effort to create a mural on that site began when a local weekly newspaper suggested that the city should somehow honor him. Dedicated on October 26, 1999, with Fine's sister in attendance, that mural showed Larry with a peculiar look on his face. In May 2006, a similar mural showing Larry with a more animated expression and playing the violin was painted over the original mural. This mural stands over the former Jon's Bar and Grill.
- On October 15, 2009, the Associated Alumni of Central High School in Philadelphia inducted Fine into that school's Hall of Fame, though he never graduated. A member of the Central Alumni Hall of Fame Committee pointed out, "Many people are not even aware that Mr. Fine was a Philadelphian and that is a part of what we’re trying to do."
- In the 2012 Farrelly brothers' film The Three Stooges, Larry is portrayed by Sean Hayes. Young Larry is portrayed by Lance Chantiles-Wertz.
