= The Three Stooges filmography =

List of shorts and features with comedy team

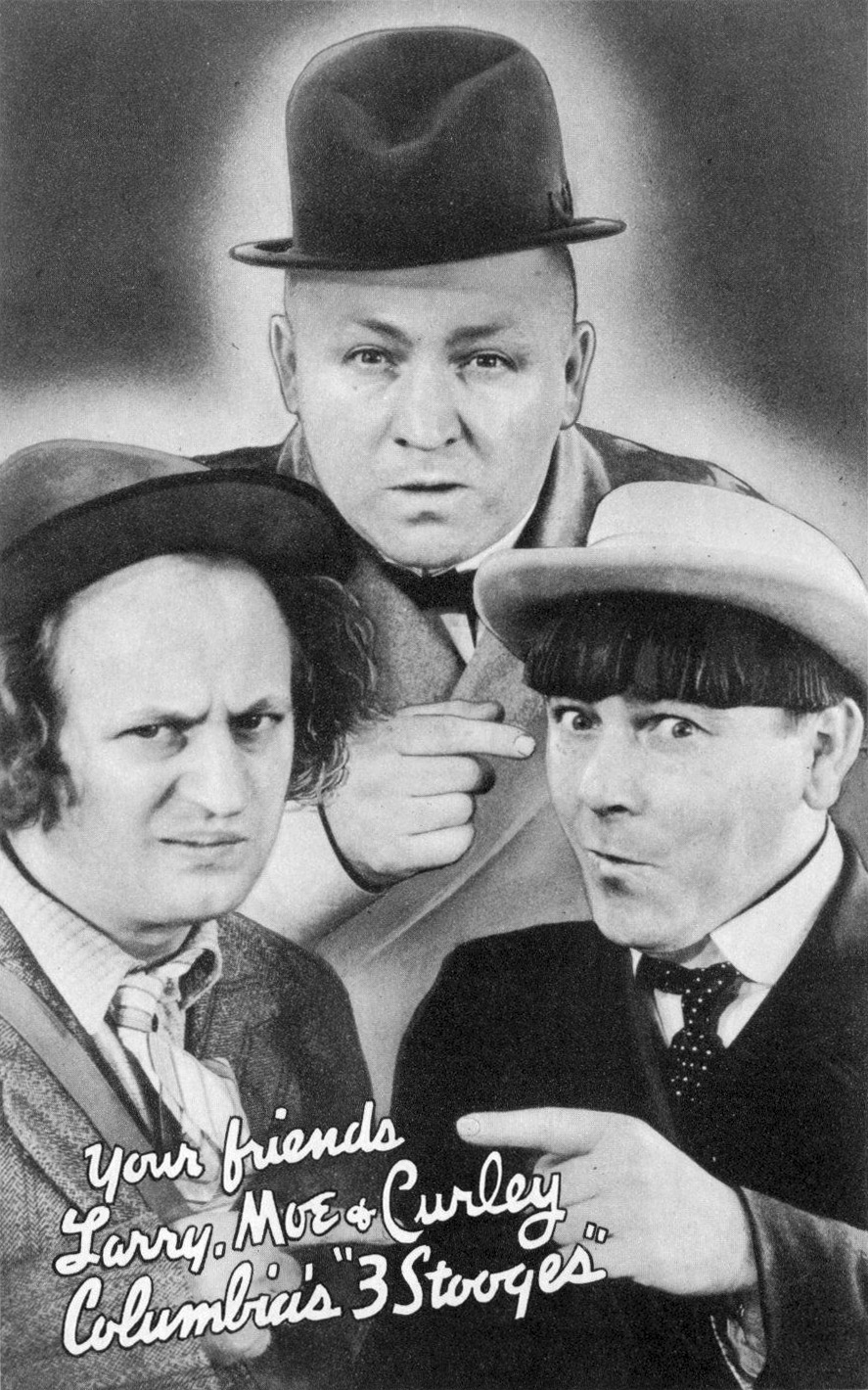
Larry Fine, Curly Howard and Moe Howard in 1937

This is a complete list of short subjects and feature films that featured The Three Stooges released between 1930 and 1970. Moe Howard, Larry Fine and Shemp Howard debuted on screen with Ted Healy in Soup to Nuts (1930) released by Fox Film Corporation. Shemp departed the act in 1932 to pursue a solo career and was replaced by his younger brother Curly Howard. This incarnation of the team appeared in several shorts and feature films with Healy at Metro-Goldwyn-Mayer in 1933 and 1934. Moe, Larry and Curly left Healy in 1934 and moved to Columbia Pictures to begin their successful series of 190 shorts, with their contract extended each year until the final one expired on December 31, 1957. Shemp returned to the act when Curly fell into his illness in 1946 and featured in 77 entries with Columbia Pictures and one independent feature-length production, Gold Raiders (1950), produced between 1947 and 1955. After Shemp's death, 16 shorts were produced with Joe Besser in 1956 and 1957. The final 8 shorts were released in 1958 and 1959 after production had ceased. The Stooges would continue with Moe, Larry, and Joe DeRita (as "Curly Joe"), and make several full-length feature films between 1959 and 1970. For more information about their solo or non-group credits, consult their individual pages.

A complete list of all 190 shorts released by Columbia Pictures between 1934 and 1957 is available in Three Stooges FAQ (2011) by David J. Hogan.

== Key ==
AAN = nominated for an Academy Award
= utilized footage from previous Stooge films
§ = denotes a cameo appearance or supporting role
⚐ = short released by Metro-Goldwyn-Mayer

1930 – 1933 – 1934 – 1935 – 1936 – 1937 – 1938 – 1939
1940 – 1941 – 1942 – 1943 – 1944 – 1945 – 1946 – 1947 – 1948 – 1949
1950 – 1951 – 1952 – 1953 – 1954 – 1955 – 1956 – 1957 – 1958 – 1959
1960 – 1961 – 1962 – 1963 – 1965 – 1968 –1969
1970

== Ted Healy and His Stooges ==
=== 1930 ===
- Soup to Nuts (September 28)

=== 1933 ===
- Nertsery Rhymes (July 6) ⚐
- Beer and Pretzels (August 26) ⚐
- Hello Pop (September 16) ⚐
- Plane Nuts (October 14) ⚐
- Meet the Baron (October 20) §
- Dancing Lady (November 24) §
- Myrt and Marge (December 4) §

=== 1934 ===
- Fugitive Lovers (January 5) §
- The Big Idea (May 12) ⚐
- Hollywood Party (June 1) §

== The Three Stooges: Moe, Larry and Curly (1933–1947) ==
=== 1933 ===
- Turn Back the Clock (August 25) §

=== 1934 ===
- 1 Woman Haters (May 5)
- 2 Punch Drunks (July 13)
- 3 Men in Black (September 28) AAN
- The Captain Hates the Sea (November 28) §
- 4 Three Little Pigskins (December 8)

=== 1935 ===
- 5 Horses' Collars (January 10)
- 6 Restless Knights (February 20)
- 7 Pop Goes the Easel (March 29)
- 8 Uncivil Warriors (April 26)
- 9 Pardon My Scotch (August 1)
- 10 Hoi Polloi (August 29)
- 11 Three Little Beers (November 28)

=== 1936 ===
- 12 Ants in the Pantry (February 6)
- 13 Movie Maniacs (February 20)
- 14 Half Shot Shooters (April 30)
- 15 Disorder in the Court (May 30) †
- 16 A Pain in the Pullman (June 27)
- 17 False Alarms (August 16)
- 18 Whoops, I'm an Indian! (September 11)
- 19 Slippery Silks (December 27)

=== 1937 ===
- 20 Grips, Grunts and Groans (January 13)
- 21 Dizzy Doctors (March 19)
- 22 3 Dumb Clucks (April 17)
- 23 Back to the Woods (May 14)
- 24 Goofs and Saddles (July 2)
- 25 Cash and Carry (September 3)
- 26 Playing the Ponies (October 15)
- 27 The Sitter Downers (November 26)

=== 1938 ===
- 28 Termites of 1938 (January 7)
- 29 Wee Wee Monsieur (February 18)
- Start Cheering (March 3) §
- 30 Tassels in the Air (April 1)
- 31 Healthy, Wealthy and Dumb (May 20)
- 32 Violent is the Word for Curly (July 2)
- 33 Three Missing Links (July 29)
- 34 Mutts to You (October 14)
- 35 Flat Foot Stooges (December 5)

=== 1939 ===
- 36 Three Little Sew and Sews (January 6)
- 37 We Want Our Mummy (February 24)
- 38 A Ducking They Did Go (April 7)
- 39 Yes, We Have No Bonanza (May 19)
- 40 Saved by the Belle (June 30)
- 41 Calling All Curs (August 25)
- 42 Oily to Bed, Oily to Rise (October 6)
- 43 Three Sappy People (December 1)

=== 1940 ===
- 44 You Nazty Spy! (January 19)
- 45 Rockin' thru the Rockies (March 8)
- 46 A Plumbing We Will Go (April 19)
- 47 Nutty but Nice (June 14)
- 48 How High Is Up? (July 26)
- 49 From Nurse to Worse (August 23)
- 50 No Census, No Feeling (October 4)
- 51 Cookoo Cavaliers (November 15)
- 52 Boobs in Arms (December 27)

=== 1941 ===
- 53 So Long Mr. Chumps (February 7)
- 54 Dutiful But Dumb (March 21)
- 55 All the World's a Stooge (May 16)
- Time Out for Rhythm (June 5)
- 56 I'll Never Heil Again (July 11)
- 57 An Ache in Every Stake (August 22)
- 58 In the Sweet Pie and Pie (October 16)
- 59 Some More of Samoa (December 4)

=== 1942 ===
- 60 Loco Boy Makes Good (January 8)
- 61 Cactus Makes Perfect (February 26)
- 62 What's the Matador? (April 23)
- 63 Matri-Phony (July 2)
- 64 Three Smart Saps (July 30)
- 65 Even as IOU (September 18)
- My Sister Eileen (September 24) §
- 66 Sock-a-Bye Baby (November 13)

=== 1943 ===
- 67 They Stooge to Conga (January 1)
- 68 Dizzy Detectives (February 5)
- 69 Spook Louder (April 2)
- 70 Back from the Front (May 28)
- 71 Three Little Twirps (July 9)
- 72 Higher Than a Kite (July 30)
- 73 I Can Hardly Wait (August 13)
- 74 Dizzy Pilots (September 24)
- 75 Phony Express (November 18)
- 76 A Gem of a Jam (December 30)

=== 1944 ===
- 77 Crash Goes the Hash (February 4)
- 78 Busy Buddies (March 18)
- 79 The Yoke's on Me (May 26)
- 80 Idle Roomers (July 15)
- 81 Gents Without Cents (September 22)
- 82 No Dough Boys (November 24)

=== 1945 ===
- 83 Three Pests in a Mess (January 19)
- 84 Booby Dupes (March 17)
- Rockin' in the Rockies (April 17)
- 85 Idiots Deluxe (July 20)
- 86 If a Body Meets a Body (August 30)
- 87 Micro-Phonies (November 15)

=== 1946 ===
- 88 Beer Barrel Polecats (January 10)
- 89 A Bird in the Head (February 28)
- Swing Parade of 1946 (March 16) †
- 90 Uncivil War Birds (March 29)
- 91 The Three Troubledoers (April 25)
- 92 Monkey Businessmen (June 20)
- 93 Three Loan Wolves (July 4)
- 94 G.I. Wanna Home (September 5)
- 95 Rhythm and Weep (October 3)
- 96 Three Little Pirates (December 5)

=== 1947 ===
- 97 Half-Wits Holiday (January 9)

=== 1960 ===
- Stop! Look! and Laugh! (July 1)

== The Three Stooges: Moe, Larry and Shemp (1947–1956) ==
=== 1947 ===
- 98 Fright Night (March 6)
- 99 Out West (April 24)
- 100 Hold That Lion! (July 17)
- 101 Brideless Groom (September 11)
- 102 Sing a Song of Six Pants (October 30)
- 103 All Gummed Up (December 18)

=== 1948 ===
- 104 Shivering Sherlocks (January 8)
- 105 Pardon My Clutch (February 26)
- 106 Squareheads of the Round Table (March 4)
- 107 Fiddlers Three (May 6)
- 108 The Hot Scots (July 8)
- 109 Heavenly Daze (September 2)
- 110 I'm a Monkey's Uncle (October 7)
- 111 Mummy's Dummies (November 4)
- 112 Crime on Their Hands (December 9)

=== 1949 ===
- 113 The Ghost Talks (February 3)
- 114 Who Done It? (March 3)
- 115 Hokus Pokus (May 5)
- 116 Fuelin' Around (July 7)
- 117 Malice in the Palace (September 1)
- 118 Vagabond Loafers (October 6)
- 119 Dunked in the Deep (November 3)

=== 1950 ===
- 120 Punchy Cowpunchers (January 5)
- 121 Hugs and Mugs (February 2)
- 122 Dopey Dicks (March 2)
- 123 Love at First Bite (May 4)
- 124 Self-Made Maids (July 6)
- 125 Three Hams on Rye (September 7)
- 126 Studio Stoops (October 5)
- 127 Slaphappy Sleuths (November 9)
- 128 A Snitch in Time (December 7)

=== 1951 ===
- 129 Three Arabian Nuts (January 4)
- 130 Baby Sitters Jitters (February 1)
- 131 Don't Throw That Knife (May 3)
- 132 Scrambled Brains (July 7)
- 133 Merry Mavericks (September 6)
- Gold Raiders (September 9) §
- 134 The Tooth Will Out (October 4)
- 135 Hula-La-La (November 1)
- 136 Pest Man Wins (December 6)

=== 1952 ===
- 137 A Missed Fortune (January 3)
- 138 Listen, Judge (March 6)
- 139 Corny Casanovas (May 1)
- 140 He Cooked His Goose (July 3)
- 141 Gents in a Jam (July 4)
- 142 Three Dark Horses (October 16)
- 143 Cuckoo on a Choo Choo (December 4)

=== 1953 ===
- 144 Up in Daisy's Penthouse (February 5)
- 145 Booty and the Beast (March 5)
- 146 Loose Loot (April 2)
- 147 Tricky Dicks (May 7)
- 148 Spooks! (June 15)
- 149 Pardon My Backfire (August 15)
- 150 Rip, Sew and Stitch (September 3)
- 151 Bubble Trouble (October 8)
- 152 Goof on the Roof (December 3)

=== 1954 ===
- 153 Income Tax Sappy (February 4)
- 154 Musty Musketeers (May 13)
- 155 Pals and Gals (June 3)
- 156 Knutzy Knights (September 2)
- 157 Shot in the Frontier (October 7)
- 158 Scotched in Scotland (November 4)

=== 1955 ===
- 159 Fling in the Ring (January 6)
- 160 Of Cash and Hash (February 3)
- 161 Gypped in the Penthouse (March 10)
- 162 Bedlam in Paradise (April 14)
- 163 Stone Age Romeos (June 2)
- 164 Wham-Bam-Slam! (September 1)
- 165 Hot Ice (October 6)
- 166 Blunder Boys (November 3)

=== 1956 ===
- 167 Husbands Beware (January 5)
- 168 Creeps (February 2)
- 169 Flagpole Jitters (April 5)
- 170 For Crimin' Out Loud (May 3)
- 171 Rumpus in the Harem (June 21)
- 172 Hot Stuff (September 6)
- 173 Scheming Schemers (October 4)
- 174 Commotion on the Ocean (November 8)

== The Three Stooges: Moe, Larry and Joe Besser (1957–1959) ==
=== 1957 ===
- 175 Hoofs and Goofs (January 31)
- 176 Muscle Up a Little Closer (February 28)
- 177 A Merry Mix Up (March 28)
- 178 Space Ship Sappy (April 18)
- 179 Guns a Poppin! (June 13)
- 180 Horsing Around (September 12)
- 181 Rusty Romeos (October 17)
- 182 Outer Space Jitters (December 5)

=== 1958 ===
- 183 Quiz Whizz (February 13)
- 184 Fifi Blows Her Top (April 10)
- 185 Pies and Guys (June 12)
- 186 Sweet and Hot (September 4)
- 187 Flying Saucer Daffy (October 9)
- 188 Oil's Well That Ends Well (December 4)

=== 1959 ===
- 189 Triple Crossed (February 2)
- 190 Sappy Bull Fighters (June 4)
- Three Stooges Fun-O-Rama (September 1)

All 190 Columbia short films were released in the DVD series The Three Stooges Collection. The series includes seven 2-disc volumes and one 3-disc volume. Volume Seven features 3D glasses for the shorts Spooks! and Pardon My Backfire.

== The Three Stooges: Larry, Moe and Curly Joe (1959–1970) ==
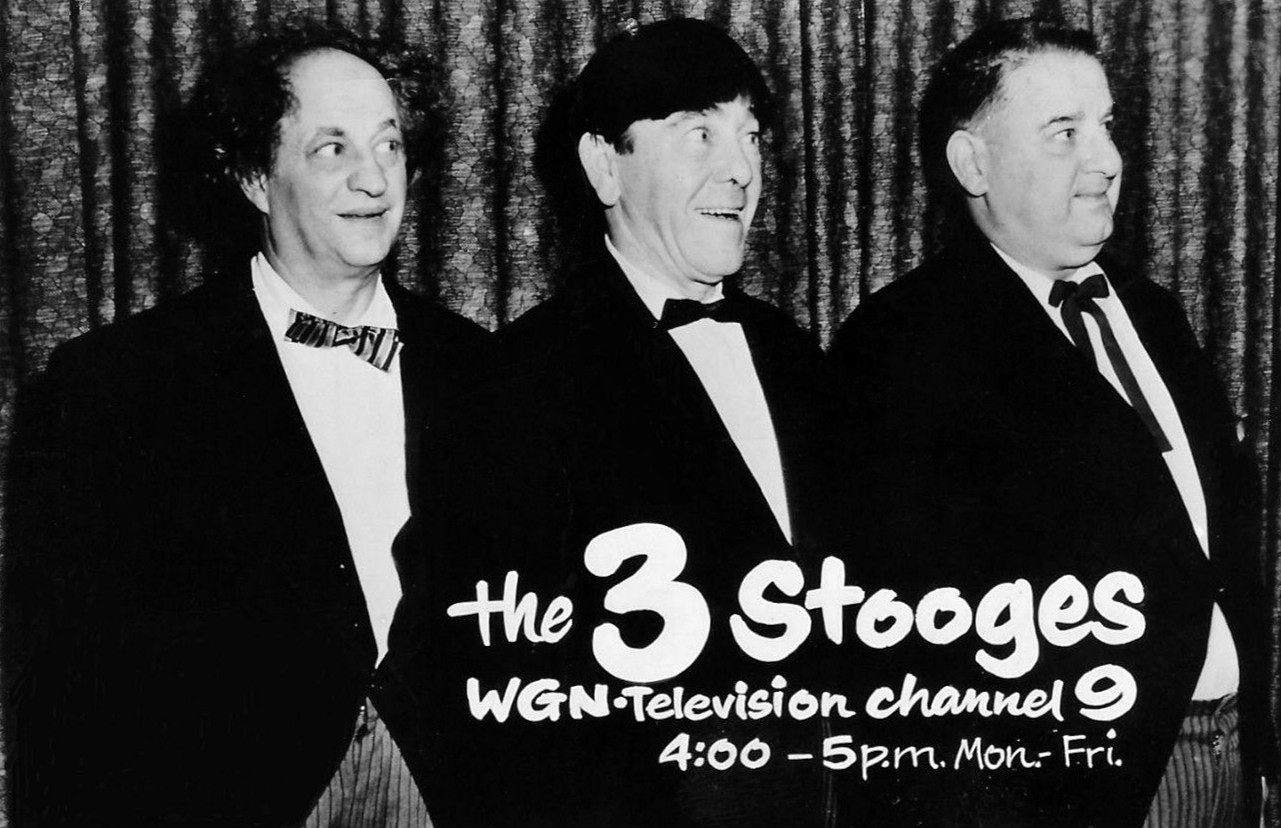
Larry, Moe and Curly Joe in 1962

=== 1959 ===
- Have Rocket, Will Travel (August 1)

=== 1961 ===
- Snow White and the Three Stooges (June 21)

=== 1962 ===
- The Three Stooges Meet Hercules (January 26)
- The Three Stooges in Orbit (July 4)

=== 1963 ===
- The Three Stooges Go Around the World in a Daze (August 21)
- It's a Mad, Mad, Mad, Mad World (November 7) §
- 4 for Texas (December 18) §

=== 1965 ===
- The Outlaws Is Coming! (January 14)

=== 1968 ===
- Star Spangled Salesman (February 9) §

=== 1970 ===
- Kook's Tour (February 5) ~
