= Pop Goes the Easel =

1935 American short film by Del Lord

- The Stooges were not professionally known as "The Three Stooges" when this film was released as they were billed by their individual names
- Directed by: Del Lord
- Written by: Felix Adler
- Produced by: Jules White
- Starring: Moe Howard; Larry Fine; Curly Howard; Bobby Burns; Phyllis Crane; Joan Howard Maurer; Phyllis Fine; William Irving
- Cinematography: Henry Freulich
- Edited by: James Sweeney
- Distributed by: Columbia Pictures
- Release date: March 29, 1935 (U.S.)
- Running time: 18:05
- Country: United States
- Language: English

Pop Goes the Easel is a 1935 short subject directed by Del Lord starring American slapstick comedy team The Three Stooges (Moe Howard, Larry Fine and Curly Howard). It is the seventh entry in the series released by Columbia Pictures starring the comedians, who released 190 shorts for the studio between 1934 and 1959.

== Plot ==
Amidst the economic turmoil of the Great Depression, the Stooges, facing dire unemployment, embark on a desperate quest for livelihood. Their initial plan is to undertake menial labor by borrowing a merchant's brooms to sweep his sidewalk, but this unexpectedly angers the merchant who thinks they are stealing the brooms. He calls for police and the trio find themselves pursued by a law enforcement officer.

In a bid to evade capture, the Stooges seek refuge within the confines of an art school. Donning smocks, berets, and false whiskers in order to disguise themselves as art students, they partake in impromptu art lessons while evading detection by the persistent police officer.

The trio's mishaps include Larry falling out of a window and Moe's destruction of a fellow student's painting. Larry's attempt to create a painting by hurling handfuls of clay at a canvas initiates a clay fight among the Stooges that quickly escalates to a riotous melee in which student artists, models, and bystanders alike are pelted with clay. The film concludes with the trio enduring a resounding defeat at the hands of vengeful artists.

== Cast ==
=== Credited ===
- Moe Howard as Moe
- Larry Fine as Larry
- Curly Howard as Curley

=== Uncredited ===
- Leo White as French artist
- Bobby Burns as Professor Fuller
- Louis Mason as Detective
- Phyllis Crane as 'The Hunt' model
- Joan Howard Maurer as Girl playing hopscotch
- Billy Engle as Storekeeper
- Phyllis Fine as Girl playing hopscotch
- Harold Breen as Art student
- Bobby Callahan as Art student
- Lew Davis as Art student
- Richard Kening as Art student
- Ellinor Vanderveer as Dignified woman
- Jack Kenney as Laughing art student
- Al Thompson as Man in car
- William Irving (actor) as Man panhandled by Curly
- Grace Goodall as Rich woman in car

== Production notes ==
Pop Goes the Easel marks several Stooge firsts:

- Del Lord’s debut as a Stooges director.
- Moe holding out his hand to Curly and asking him to "pick out two" fingers. Curly does, and Moe pokes him in the eyes with them. This would be a recurring joke. In addition, the short contains a very rare scene in which Moe delivers a slap in the face to several people at once. At the end of the clay fight scene, Moe stops everyone and asks, "Who started this?!" Larry yells, "YOU did!", to which Moe angrily replies, "Oh, YEAH?!" and, with right hand extended, spins in a counter-clockwise motion, slapping everyone around him.
- A clay-throwing fight, a precursor to the classic pie fights which would become a staple of the Stooge films. The first genuine pie fight would appear the following year in Slippery Silks.
- Moe holding out his fist to Curly and says, "See that?" When Curly replies, "Yeah," he smacks the fist dismissively, in which it swings in a circle behind Moe's body, over his head, and bops Curly on the head with it.
- Curly dressing in drag, a gag that would be revisited in several later Stooge shorts, such as Uncivil Warriors, Movie Maniacs, Whoops, I'm an Indian!, Wee Wee Monsieur, Mutts to You, Oily to Bed, Oily to Rise, Nutty But Nice, Matri-Phony, Micro-Phonies, Uncivil War Birds and Rhythm and Weep.

The title of the film Pop Goes the Easel is a pun on the nursery rhyme "Pop Goes the Weasel", which is used for the one and only time as the opening theme. The film also ends with the tune, as with the ending of Punch Drunks. It was filmed on February 6–11, 1935.

The two girls playing hopscotch on the sidewalk are Larry Fine's daughter, Phyllis (who died in 1989 at age 60) and Moe Howard's daughter, Joan (Who died in 2021 at the age of 94).

A colorized version of Pop Goes the Easel was released in 2006 as part of the DVD collection entitled "Stooges on the Run".

According to the updated version of the book The Three Stooges Scrapbook, there was an alternate clay fight in the script by Jules White. It was listed as unused or edited. A careful viewer of the clay fight can see some places where the two clay battles were filmed and edited to make one battle. Differences include: The female model is standing in the foreground close to the screen at the beginning, but when she's hit with clay she's standing in front of the windows. She's brunette throughout the whole short, but at the ending, her hair is blonde. As the Stooges walk through the studio, there are spots on the wall made from clay. The officer who was chasing them is out cold and struck with a piece of clay, but later is shown getting his toupee knocked off his head (from a thrown piece) as he is throwing clay.
