= Dizzy Doctors =

1937 American short film by Del Lord

- Directed by: Del Lord
- Screenplay by: Al Ray
- Story by: Charlie Melson
- Produced by: Jules White
- Starring: Moe Howard; Larry Fine; Curly Howard; Vernon Dent; Horace Murphy; Cy Schindell; Frank Mills; Bud Jamison; June Gittelson; Blanche Payson; Ione Leslie; Lew Davis
- Cinematography: Benjamin H. Kline
- Edited by: Charles Nelson
- Distributed by: Columbia Pictures
- Release date: March 19, 1937 (U.S.)
- Running time: 17:41
- Country: United States
- Language: English

Dizzy Doctors is a 1937 short subject directed by Del Lord starring American slapstick comedy team The Three Stooges (Moe Howard, Larry Fine and Curly Howard). It is the 21st entry in the series released by Columbia Pictures starring the comedians, who released 190 shorts for the studio between 1934 and 1959.

== Plot ==
The lazy Stooges, roused from their mid-day slumber by the demands of their spouses to seek gainful employment, serendipitously encounter Dr. Bright, the president of a company in need of salesmen for his novel concoction, Brighto. Marketed with the slogan "it makes old bodies new", Brighto is mistakenly perceived by the Stooges as a polish, prompting them to embark on an enthusiastic street-side campaign to showcase its efficacy to potential clients.

Their demonstrations yield calamitous outcomes: Larry rubs Brighto on a policeman's uniform and the fabric disintegrates, Moe damages a passerby's footwear, and the application of Brighto strips the paint from a gentleman's pristine automobile. Fleeing from their angry victims, the Stooges retreat to Dr. Bright's premises and complain to him about the performance of the supposed polish. Dr. Bright rebukes them but, after elucidating that Brighto is intended as a medicine, he grants the Stooges another opportunity to prove their salesmanship. Emboldened by this second chance, the Stooges infiltrate Los Arms Hospital, endeavoring to peddle Brighto to the ailing patients. Their entrepreneurial zeal, however, is met with further misfortune when they are confronted by the superintendent, who recognizes them as the culprits who damaged the paint on his car.

When he gives chase, the Stooges ingeniously manipulate an elevator, dispatching the superintendent to an unintended destination before hastily escaping into the street via a hospital gurney. Their flight ends in a collision and a jump through an open window into their beds, where they promptly resume their interrupted repose.

== Cast ==
=== Credited ===
- Moe Howard as Moe
- Larry Fine as Larry
- Curly Howard as Curly

=== Uncredited ===
- June Gittelson as Moe's wife
- Blanche Payson as Larry's wife
- Ione Leslie as Curly's wife
- Vernon Dent as Dr. Harry Arms
- Horace Murphy as Dr. Bright
- Betty McMahon as Dr. Bright's secretary
- Louise Carver as Lady by car
- Jack "Tiny" Lipson as Shoe shine customer
- Bud Jamison as Cop
- Lew Davis as Man in small car
- William J. Irving as Surgeon
- Al Thompson as 2nd surgeon
- Cy Schindell, Sam Lufkin as Pursuing orderlies
- Bobby Burns as Patient in wheelchair
- Frank Mills as Sleeping patient
- A. R. Haysel as Dandruff patient
- Harlene Wood as Sleeping/Dandruff patients' attending nurse
- Chuck Callahan as Orderly in operating room
- Casey Columbo as Patient on hospital gurney
- Ella McKenzie as Desk nurse
- Gertrude Messinger, Elaine Waters as Nurses

== Production notes ==
Filming of Dizzy Doctors was completed between December 9 and 12, 1936. The footage of the Stooges sailing on a gurney through the city streets would be reused in From Nurse to Worse.

The Stooges try to sell their medicine in the Los Arms Hospital; this is the same hospital seen in Men in Black.

This is the first of three Stooge shorts with the word "dizzy" in the title.

When Moe hits each of the skulls in turn each sounds a different note. The tones are a parody of the G-E-C pattern used for the NBC Chimes.

A colorized version of this film was released in 2006. It was part of the DVD collection entitled "Stooges on the Run".
