= Three Little Sew and Sews =

1939 film by Del Lord

- Directed by: Del Lord
- Written by: Ewart Adamson
- Produced by: Jules White
- Starring: Moe Howard; Larry Fine; Curly Howard; Harry Semels; James C. Morton; Phyllis Barry; Bud Jamison; Vernon Dent; Lew Davis; Ned Glass
- Cinematography: Lucien Ballard
- Edited by: Charles Nelson
- Distributed by: Columbia Pictures
- Release date: January 9, 1939 (U.S.)
- Running time: 15:47
- Country: United States
- Language: English

Three Little Sew and Sews is a 1939 short subject directed by Del Lord starring American slapstick comedy team The Three Stooges (Moe Howard, Larry Fine and Curly Howard). It is the 36th entry in the series released by Columbia Pictures starring the comedians, who released 190 shorts for the studio between 1934 and 1959.

== Plot ==
The Stooges are sailors stationed at a naval base, where they are gainfully employed within a tailor shop. They are entrusted with cleaning and pressing Admiral Taylor's uniform, which Curly pilfers with the intention of leveraging its authority to impress women. This act of subterfuge sets the stage for a series of misadventures that propel the trio into a plot involving espionage.

Under the guise of the counterfeit Admiral and his purported aides, Moe and Larry, the Stooges unwittingly become ensnared in the machinations of nefarious agents, Count Alfred Gehrol and Miss Olga Arvin, who are operatives of an antagonistic regime. Deceived by their adversaries, the trio is coerced into perpetrating a scheme involving the theft and hijacking of a submarine.

The Stooges eventually realize that Gehrol and Arvin are spies and succeed in apprehending them, thereby thwarting their malevolent designs. However, their triumph is short-lived, as Curly accidentally detonates a bomb during a reenactment of the capture for the genuine Admiral Taylor, with the result that he Stooges are transformed into celestial beings ascending to Heaven. Pursuing them is the irate Admiral, also in celestial form.

== Cast ==
=== Credited ===
- Moe Howard as Moe
- Larry Fine as Larry
- Curly Howard as Curly
- Phyllis Barry as Miss Olga Arvin
- Harry Semels as Count Alfred Gehrol

=== Uncredited ===
- James C. Morton as Admiral H. S. Taylor
- Ned Glass as Sailor
- Pat Lane as Lieutenant
- Cy Schindell as Brig guard
- John Ince as Butler
- Vernon Dent as laughing party guest
- Bud Jamison as Policeman
- John Tyrrell as Naval Officer
- Bert Young, Charles Dorety as S.P.'s on submarine
- Lew Davis, Earlene Heath, Elaine Waters, Al Thompson as party guests

== Production notes ==
Three Little Sew and Sews was filmed on March 21–24, 1938, and was the last entry to utilize "Listen to the Mockingbird" as the Stooges' official theme song. It was filmed directly after Violent Is the Word for Curly but before Flat Foot Stooges, the latter being the first film to employ "Three Blind Mice" as the Stooges' official theme song.

The title Sew and Sew is a pun on "so and so", a softly worded insult for a person one finds unimpressionable, or a euphemism for "son-of-a-bitch".

Three Little Sew and Sews is one of several Stooge shorts in which a sofa spring manages to become attached to someone's backside. This gag was also used in Hoi Polloi, An Ache in Every Stake, Hugs and Mugs and Have Rocket, Will Travel. In addition, footage of war scenes were later used in Boobs in Arms and They Stooge to Conga. The short is also the fifth of sixteen Stooge shorts with the word "three" in the title.

Unlike most Stooge films, Three Little Sew and Sews ends with the trio being killed. This plot device was only used in a handful of their shorts, among them being You Nazty Spy!, I'll Never Heil Again and Half Shot Shooters.
