= Three Little Beers =

1935 American short film by Del Lord

- Directed by: Del Lord
- Written by: Clyde Bruckman
- Produced by: Jules White
- Starring: Moe Howard; Larry Fine; Curly Howard; Bud Jamison; Jack "Tiny" Lipson; Harry Semels; Lew Davis; Althea Henley
- Cinematography: Benjamin H. Kline
- Edited by: William Lyon
- Distributed by: Columbia Pictures
- Release date: November 28, 1935 (U.S.)
- Running time: 16:32
- Country: United States
- Language: English

Three Little Beers is a 1935 short subject directed by Del Lord starring American slapstick comedy team The Three Stooges (Moe Howard, Larry Fine and Curly Howard). It is the 11th entry in the series released by Columbia Pictures starring the comedians, who released 190 shorts for the studio between 1934 and 1959.

== Plot ==
The Stooges are employed at Panther Pilsner Beer company, where they encounter a series of mishaps while loading barrels onto their delivery truck. Upon learning about a cash prize golf tournament sponsored by their company, they hastily head to the Rancho Golf Club to hone their golfing skills. Using makeshift press badges, they infiltrate the event, where their style of play causes chaos and destruction on the golf course.

Curly's attempt to retrieve a stuck golf ball results in him chopping down a tree, Moe leaves the ground pockmarked with divots as he keeps missing his hits with the golf ball, and Larry's effort to remove a root disrupts the putting green. Their behavior enrages the Italian groundskeepers, who alert the golf course management and prompt a police pursuit.

While escaping in their beer truck, the Stooges lose control, sending barrels tumbling down a hill in pursuit. Their frantic flight concludes with them accidentally plunging into wet cement on a nearby sidewalk.

== Cast ==
=== Credited ===
- Moe Howard as Moe
- Larry Fine as Larry
- Curly Howard as Curly
- Bud Jamison as Mr. Panther

=== Uncredited cast ===
- Jack "Tiny" Lipson as Jones
- Eddie Laughton as relief desk clerk
- Jack Kenney as additional desk clerk
- Monte Carter as first groundskeeper
- Harry Semels as second groundskeeper
- William Irving as cement layer
- Stanley Mack as first Press entrant
- Larry Wheat as second Press entrant
- Frank Terry as short man in locker room who shoots perfect 78
- Marvin Loback as bald man in locker room
- John Tyrrell as golfer who shot birdie
- Charles Dorety as annoyed golfer on 18th hole
- Arthur Thalasso as golfer on 18th hole
- Lew Davis as golfer on 18th hole
- George Gray as apologizing caddy on 18th hole
- Chet Brandenburg as second golfer yelling "fore"
- George Ovey as golfer with three girls
- Althea Henley as girl on golf course
- Eve Reynolds as girl on golf course
- Ninette Crawford as girl on golf course
- Frank Mills as golfer with lost ball
- Harry Keatan as golfer who advises Curly his ball is in a tree
- Sam Lufkin as first policeman at golf course
- George Magrill as policeman directing traffic

== Production notes ==
Three Little Beers was filmed on location in Los Angeles, California on October 9–12, 1935; it features more outdoor locations than any other Stooges film. The golf course featured was Rancho Golf Course, on Pico Boulevard and Patricia Avenue in Cheviot Hills, located across the street from 20th Century Fox studios. The scene featuring rolling beer barrels chasing the Stooges down a hilly street was filmed off of Echo Park Avenue in Los Angeles.

This short also marks the first appearances of two Stooge regulars, Eddie Laughton and John Tyrrell.

The leaflet the boys read announcing the Panther Brewing Company’s Sixth Annual Golf Tournament states the event will be held at the Public Golf Course “Sunday, Dec. 19, 1935”, however, December 19 fell on a Thursday that year.

== In popular culture ==
Two slapstick routines from Three Little Beers were reworked in the Farrelly brothers 2012 Three Stooges film:

- Moe smacks Larry with his right hand, and Larry cries "Oh, my neck!", then Moe slaps him again with his left hand and asks "How does it feel now?" and Larry replies "All right," then Moe slaps him yet again with both hands and says "That's good. C'mon on! What's the matter with you?".
- In a deleted scene on the DVD release, Curly is washing his clothes on the golf course (the original scene from 1935 featured Curly using a ball washer for laundering his clothes). Moe is about to smack Curly, but Larry butts in and asks what's going on. Moe tries to poke Larry's eyes, but Curly stops him. Moe then slaps Curly. He turns to Larry, who has his eyes covered. Moe smacks the top of Larry's head, Larry opens his hand, and Moe pokes his eyes, this continues twice. Moe sets up his fist, Curly smacks, Moe begins the around-the-world bop (or "hand-to-hand head clunk"), hitting Larry's chin in the process, then hitting Curly's head.
