= Murder in Times Square =

1943 film directed by Lew Landers

- Directed by: Lew Landers
- Written by: Paul Gangelin; Stuart Palmer
- Produced by: Colbert Clark
- Starring: Edmund Lowe; Marguerite Chapman; John Litel
- Cinematography: L. William O'Connell
- Edited by: Richard Fantl
- Music by: Morris Stoloff
- Production company: Columbia Pictures
- Distributed by: Columbia Pictures
- Release date: April 1, 1943
- Running time: 65 minutes
- Country: United States
- Language: English

Murder in Times Square is a 1943 American mystery film directed by Lew Landers and starring Edmund Lowe, Marguerite Chapman and John Litel.

The film's sets were designed by the art director Lionel Banks.

== Plot ==
A Broadway playwright investigates a series of deaths that appear to be related to his latest play.

== Cast ==
- Edmund Lowe as Cory Williams
- Marguerite Chapman as Melinda Matthews
- John Litel as Dr. Blaine
- William Wright as Det. Lt. Tabor
- Bruce Bennett as Supai George
- Esther Dale as Longacre Lil
- Veda Ann Borg as Fiona Maclair
- Gerald Mohr as O'Dell Gissing
- Sidney Blackmer as George Nevins
- Leslie Denison as Rob Slocumb
- Douglas Leavitt as Henry Trigg
- George McKay as Southcote
- Ernie Adams as Horsetooth
- Richard Bartell as Reporter
- Wilson Benge as Butler
- Symona Boniface as Theatre Patron
- Eddie Borden as Reporter
- Lynton Brent as Audience Member
- Jack Cheatham as Policeman
- Edmund Cobb as Detective
- Lew Davis as Reporter
- Connie Evans as Showgirl
- Bud Geary as Policeman
- Sidney Grayler as Reporter
- Al Hill as Older Detective
- Robert Homans as Meehan, 1st Policeman
- Lloyd Ingraham as Pedestrian
- Eddie Laughton as Younger Detective
- George Lloyd as Policeman
- LeRoy Mason as Party Guest
- David McKim as Newsboy
- Lynn Merrick as Nurse
- James C. Morton as Policeman
- Frank O'Connor as Detective Lewis
- Dagmar Oakland as Theatre Patron
- Gerald Pierce as Newsboy
- Ann Savage as Miss Ruth
- Charles Sullivan as Policeman
- Frank Sully as Benny the Baboon, Snake Exhibit Owner
- Paul Sutton as Drunk
- John Tyrrell as Elevator Operator
- Marin Sais as Minor Role

== Bibliography ==
- Morton, Lisa & Adamson, Kent. Savage Detours: The Life and Work of Ann Savage. McFarland, 2009.
