= Mooching Through Georgia =

- Directed by: Jules White
- Written by: Clyde Bruckman; Buster Keaton
- Produced by: Jules White
- Starring: Buster Keaton; Monte Collins; Lynton Brent Bud Jamison; Ned Glass; Jack Hill; Stanley Mack; Nick Copeland; Joe Murphy; Cy Schindell
- Cinematography: John Stumar
- Edited by: Art Seid
- Distributed by: Columbia Pictures
- Release date: August 11, 1939
- Country: United States
- Language: English

Mooching Through Georgia is the second short subject film starring American comedian Buster Keaton made for Columbia Pictures. Keaton made a total of ten films for the studio between 1939 and 1941.

== Plot ==
Keaton plays an American Civil War veteran named Homer Cobb, who tells his story of being a Kentucky youth who enlisted in the Confederate Army, but discovered that his brother, Cyrus Cobb joined the Union Army. Homer gets captured but Cyrus frees him. Cyrus is captured by the Confederate army but Homer, in turn, frees him. Homer uses all his wits and a few short logs of wood to save his town.

== Cast ==
- Buster Keaton as Homer Cobb
- Monte Collins as Cyrus Cobb

== Production ==
Mooching Through Georgia was Keaton's second film about the American Civil War, his first being The General. The film was later remade in 1946 as Uncivil War Birds starring the Three Stooges (Curly Howard, Moe Howard, and Larry Fine). The song "Dixie" replaces Buster's regular opening theme of "Mary Had a Little Lamb" (later "Three Blind Mice") for this film, and continues as background music for approximately twenty seconds into the opening scene.
