= Lynton Brent =

American actor (1897-1981)

- Brent in The Three Stooges 1940 film From Nurse to Worse
- Born: Lynton Wright Brent; August 2, 1897; Chicago, Illinois, United States
- Died: July 12, 1981 (aged 83); Los Angeles, California, United States
- Occupations: Actor writer
- Years active: 1930–1950

Lynton Wright Brent (August 2, 1897 – July 2, 1981) was an American film actor and a writer. He appeared in over 240 films between 1930 and 1950.

== Career ==
Brent is best known for his prolific work with Columbia Pictures in the Three Stooges short subjects such as A Ducking They Did Go and From Nurse to Worse.

Brent performed on stage for a decade before he began working in films.

In addition to his film career, Brent also wrote a number of literary works, notably Lesbian Gang. Though little recognized when first published in 1964, it has achieved notoriety among a niche queer audience in Peckham, England. His first novel was The Bird Cage.

== Selected filmography ==
- Love Bound (1932)
- King Kong (1933)
- The Intruder (1933)
- Mystery Mountain (1934)
- Three Little Pigskins (1934)
- Restless Knights (1935)
- Streamline Express (1935)
- Ants in the Pantry (1936)
- Half Shot Shooters (1936)
- 3 Dumb Clucks (1937)
- Frontier Town (1938)
- Here's Flash Casey (1938) (unbilled)
- Mr. Wong, Detective (1938)
- It's All in Your Mind (1938)
- A Ducking They Did Go (1939)
- Yes, We Have No Bonanza (1939)
- Calling All Curs (1939)
- Nutty But Nice (1940)
- From Nurse to Worse (1940)
- Cookoo Cavaliers (1940)
- Boobs in Arms (1940)
- Forbidden Trails (1941)
- The Pioneers (1941)
- So Long Mr. Chumps (1941)
- I'll Never Heil Again (1941)
- In the Sweet Pie and Pie (1941)
- The Lone Rider in Cheyenne (1942)
- Raiders of the West (1942)
- Loco Boy Makes Good (1942)
- Man from Cheyenne (1942)
- Overland to Deadwood (1942)
- Trail Riders (1942)
- Dizzy Detectives (1943)
- The Utah Kid (1944)
- Gents Without Cents (1944)
- Valley of Vengeance (1944)
- Micro-Phonies (1945)
- Beer Barrel Polecats (1946)
- Drifting Along (1946)
