= Jack Lipson =

American actor (1901–1947)

- Born: January 17, 1901
- Died: November 28, 1947 (aged 46)
- Other name: Jack "Tiny" Lipson
- Years active: 1927-1947

Jack "Tiny" Lipson (January 17, 1901 – November 28, 1947) was an American film actor. He appeared in over 85 films between 1927 and 1948.

== Career ==
Lipson played character parts, and was usually uncredited. Due to his rotund, towering figure, Lipson gained the nickname "Tiny" and was usually cast as the "fat guy" in films. He played the role of King Vultan the 1936 serial Flash Gordon. In 1941, he appeared in Never Give a Sucker an Even Break as a Turkish passenger aboard an airplane with W. C. Fields, whose mumbled remarks about the passenger's size prompt the retort, "You a big nose have it!" Two years later, Lipson portrayed a German sailor in the Three Stooges' short Back from the Front, in which he is knocked unconscious and collapses on top of a suffocating Larry Fine. Moe Howard comes to the rescue and quips, "Whoa, a German whale!".

== Death ==
Lipson died of a heart attack on November 28, 1947, aged 46. He is interred at Hollywood Forever Cemetery in Hollywood, California.

== Partial filmography ==
- One Hysterical Night (1929) - Masquerade Guest (uncredited)
- The Long Long Trail (1929) - Traveling Salesman in Bar (uncredited)
- Skinner Steps Out (1929) - Neighbor
- Dames Ahoy! (1930) - Scotsman in Kilt (uncredited)
- Undertow (1930) - Beach Vendor (uncredited)
- Human Targets (1932) - Wrangler (uncredited)
- The Fighting Gentleman (1932) - Big Husband at Carnival (uncredited)
- Prosperity (1932) - George, Bank Depositor Demanding Proof (uncredited)
- The Show-Off (1934) - Excursion Boat Passenger (uncredited)
- Manhattan Melodrama (1934) - Uncle Angus (uncredited)
- Punch Drunks (1934, Short) - Fat Ringsider (uncredited)
- King Kelly of the U.S.A. (1934) - Ship's Passenger (uncredited)
- Tailspin Tommy (1934, Serial) - Hefty Extra in Cafe [Ch. 5] (uncredited)
- Babes in Toyland (1934) - Nobleman (uncredited)
- The Painted Veil (1934) - Fat Man (scenes deleted)
- Beginner's Luck (1935, Short) - Audience member #4
- The Drunkard (1935) - Farmer Stevens
- The Case of the Curious Bride (1935) - Big Man with Newspaper (uncredited)
- A Night at the Opera (1935) - Engineer's Assistant (uncredited)
- Three Little Beers (1935, Short) - Jones (uncredited)
- A Face in the Fog (1936) - Fat Detective (uncredited)
- The Lucky Corner (1936, Short) - Crowd extra #6
- Flash Gordon (1936, Serial) - King Vultan [Chs. 5-13]
- Slippery Silks (1936, Short) - Chief of Missing Persons Bureau (uncredited)
- Dizzy Doctors (1937, Short) - Shoeshine Victim (uncredited)
- Brothers of the West (1937) - Jake the Hobo
- Flying Fists (1937) - Duncan
- One Man Justice (1937) - Slim
- Playing the Ponies (1937, Short) - Customer (uncredited)
- Professor Beware (1938) - Brawler (uncredited)
- Six-Gun Trail (1938) - Cafe Waiter (uncredited)
- Outlaws' Paradise (1939) - Toby, Saloon Owner (uncredited)
- Heaven with a Barbed Wire Fence (1939) - Man in Saloon (uncredited)
- Rocky Mountain Rangers (1940) - 2nd Bartender (uncredited)
- Murder Over New York (1940) - Hindu Businessman (uncredited)
- Federal Fugitives (1941) - Henchman (uncredited)
- I'll Never Heil Again (1941, Short) - Bay of Rum (uncredited)
- Manpower (1941) - Midnight Club Bartender (uncredited)
- Never Give a Sucker an Even Break (1941, Short) - Huge Turk (uncredited)
- The Chocolate Soldier (1941) - Captain Masakroff in Show (uncredited)
- Hellzapoppin' (1941) - Junior (uncredited)
- Babes on Broadway (1941) - Hefty Customer at Nick's (uncredited)
- Wild Bill Hickok Rides (1942) - Bass Casino Singer (uncredited)
- I Married an Angel (1942) - Mr. Roquefort (uncredited)
- Back from the Front (1943, Short) - Huge German Sailor (uncredited)
- I Dood It (1943) - Big Man at Bazaar (uncredited)
- When Strangers Marry (1944) - Man in Cafeteria (uncredited)
- Kismet (1944) - Aide to Mansur (uncredited)
- Lost in a Harem (1944) - Café Small Cornet Player (uncredited)
- The Clock (1945) - Garbage Man (uncredited)
- Dillinger (1945) - Movie Theatre Patron (uncredited)
- Two Sisters from Boston (1946) - Drexel - Sleeping Man on Stage (uncredited)
- Suspense (1946) - Spectator (uncredited)
- No Leave, No Love (1946) - Hunky Expectant Father (uncredited)
- Bringing Up Father (1946) - Fat Man (uncredited)
- Three Daring Daughters (1948) - Freddy, Fat Man on Street (uncredited)
- Summer Holiday (1948) - Klaumeyer (uncredited)
- The Bride Goes Wild (1948) - Fat Man (uncredited)
- Luxury Liner (1948) - Fat Guest (uncredited) (final film role)
