= Horses' Collars =

1935 film by Clyde Bruckman

- Mistitled lobby card (as the singular Horse Collars)
- Directed by: Clyde Bruckman
- Written by: Felix Adler
- Produced by: Jules White
- Starring: Moe Howard; Larry Fine; Curly Howard; Dorothy Kent; Fred Kohler; Fred Kelsey
- Cinematography: John W. Boyle
- Edited by: James Sweeney
- Distributed by: Columbia Pictures
- Release date: January 10, 1935
- Running time: 18:01
- Country: United States
- Language: English

Horses' Collars is a 1935 short subject directed by Clyde Bruckman and starring American slapstick comedy team The Three Stooges (Moe Howard, Larry Fine and Curly Howard). It is the fifth entry in the series released by Columbia Pictures starring the comedians, who released 190 short films for the studio between 1934 and 1959.

== Plot ==
The Stooges travel west on behalf of Detective Hyden Zeke to help Nell Higginbottom recover an IOU obtained from her father by outlaw Double Deal Decker. Decker intends to use the IOU to claim Nell's ranch, and the Stooges must retrieve the document to prevent him from taking the property.

The Stooges meet Nell at Decker's saloon and steal his wallet while dancing. When Decker catches them with the wallet, he and his men attempt to hang the trio.

The Stooges later enter Decker's hideout and break into a safe containing the IOU. They confront Decker and his gang, with Curly repeatedly going berserk at the sight of a mouse, giving him extraordinary strength to fight the outlaws.

== Production notes ==
Horses' Collars was filmed on November 23–27, 1934. The opening theme song is titled "At the Races," composed by Louis Silvers. Curly has a violent reaction to the sight of a live mouse at any time, going into a fit while demanding, "Moe! Larry! The Cheese!". The only cure is for someone to feed him cheese, with Curly telling them which kind. The reason for this is explained by Moe & Larry, stating that Curly's father was a rat. The kind of cheeses that Curly calls for are roquefort, camembert, and limburger.

An external stimulus — as with Curly spotting the mouse — that causes him to go bonkers was also used as a plot element in Punch Drunks, Grips, Grunts and Groans, and Tassels in the Air.

Horses' Collars was the first of 17 Western-themed films the Stooges would make. It is also the first short where the Stooges sing "You'll Never Know What Tears Are" in barbershop music style. This song would make an appearance in future shorts Half-Shot Shooters and A Ducking They Did Go.

The casting of Kohler, who played the villain in countless actual westerns, gave the film some added authenticity.
