= Hoi Polloi =

1935 American short film by Del Lord

- Original lobby card
- Directed by: Del Lord
- Written by: Felix Adler; Helen Howard (uncredited)
- Produced by: Jules White
- Starring: Moe Howard; Larry Fine; Curly Howard; Harry Holman; Robert Graves; Phyllis Crane; Geneva Mitchell; William Irving; Bud Jamison; James C. Morton
- Cinematography: Henry Freulich
- Edited by: James Sweeney
- Distributed by: Columbia Pictures
- Release date: August 29, 1935 (U.S.)
- Running time: 17:52
- Country: United States
- Language: English

Hoi Polloi is a 1935 slapstick comedy short subject directed by Del Lord starring American slapstick comedy team The Three Stooges (Moe Howard, Larry Fine and Curly Howard). It is the tenth entry in the series released by Columbia Pictures starring the comedians, who released 190 shorts for the studio between 1934 and 1959.

== Plot ==
In a cinematic adaptation of George Bernard Shaw's 1913 play Pygmalion, Professor Richmond champions the belief that social behavior is predominantly shaped by environmental factors rather than inherent traits. His colleague, Professor Nichols, insists that social behavior is determined by heredity. Proposing a high-stakes wager, Richmond says it would take him no more than three months to transform an individual from the lowest stratum of society into a gentleman through training and exposure to refined surroundings. Nichols accepts the wager on condition that Richmond refine three individuals, thereby testing the limits of Richmond's theory. Soon afterward, the professors encounter the Stooges, employed as garbage men, and recruit them as test subjects.

Despite earnest efforts to instill proper etiquette and refinement, the Stooges continually falter in their assimilation to high society. At a lavish society party hosted by Richmond, the Stooges' comportment is marked by a series of comical mishaps and social blunders. These include sartorial hijinks and a cascade of faux pas involving grooming, culinary decorum, and theft of silverware. Ultimately, their inelegant dancing – marked by much falling – culminates in an exchange of slaps between Curly and his partner, an altercation between Curly and Professor Nichols, and a prolonged beating administered to Curly by Moe.

Acknowledging defeat, Professor Richmond concedes the wager and presents a check to Professor Nichols. However, the attempt to smooth over the disruption with an apology to Mrs. Richmond backfires, leading to a slapstick exchange of physical retribution among the guests, who have acquired the coarse manners of the Stooges. Disillusioned by the absurdity of high society, the Stooges opt to depart, only to be subjected to one final comedic blow from Richmond, Nichols, and the butler.

== Production notes ==
The idea for Hoi Polloi came from Moe Howard's wife, Helen, who was offered either screen credit or money (she took the latter). Moe later stated that the plot of Hoi Polloi was so good that it bore repeating. The Stooges reworked the film twice more, as Half-Wits Holiday in 1947 (Curly's final starring role) and Pies and Guys in 1958. Filming for Hoi Polloi was completed May 2–6, 1935.

In the first street scene where the Stooges are rubbish sanitation workers, the original "Hollywoodland" sign is visible in the distance. On the street is a marquee advertising the film Mississippi featuring Bing Crosby. Coincidentally, this film also co-stars Fred Kohler who portrayed Double Deal Decker in the short Horses' Collars released the same year.

In the Three Stooges 75th Anniversary Special, hosted by Woody Harrelson, the dancing scene with Geneva Mitchell was voted by the fans as their favorite Stooge moment of all time. The dancing sequence footage would be reused in 1941's In the Sweet Pie and Pie.

This is the first of three shorts in which Curly gets a sofa spring attached to his back. The spring gag would be used again in Three Little Sew and Sews, An Ache in Every Stake, with Shemp Howard in Hugs and Mugs and Curly-Joe DeRita in Have Rocket, Will Travel.

During the dance sequence, Larry loses his shoe. At one point actress Phyllis Crane, dancing with Moe, trips on the shoe and falls down, visibly striking her head on the floor; this was not scripted.

A colorized version of this film was released in 2006. It was not released on a Stooge DVD, but rather as a hastily added DVD bonus feature for the Jamie Foxx movie Breakin' All the Rules.
