= Harry Semels =

American film actor (1887–1946)

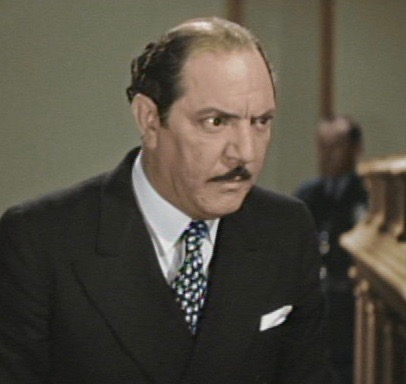
- Semels in the Three Stooges short Disorder in the Court (1936)
- Born: November 20, 1887; New York City, U.S.
- Died: March 2, 1946 (aged 58); Hollywood, California, U.S.
- Occupation: Actor
- Years active: 1917–1946
- Spouse: Jean Semels
- Children: 2

Harry Semels (November 20, 1887 – March 2, 1946) was an American film actor. He appeared in over 315 films between 1917 and 1946.

== Career ==
Semels made his film debut in 1917. He appeared in several Three Stooges shorts for Columbia Pictures including Disorder in the Court, Wee Wee Monsieur and Three Little Sew and Sews. He also appeared in feature films like Road to Morocco, The Princess and the Pirate and The Kid from Brooklyn. A versatile character actor, Semels was often cast as villains, waiters, lawyers and soldiers.

== Personal life ==
Semels was Jewish and had two children, Ruth and David, who was killed in action during World War II.

== Death ==
Semels died of a heart attack on March 2, 1946, in Hollywood, California. He was 58 years old.

== Selected filmography ==
- Here Comes the Bride (1919)
- A Fallen Idol (1919)
- Bound and Gagged (1919)
- The Black Secret (1919)
- Pirate Gold (1920)
- Rogues and Romance (1920)
- The Phantom Foe (1920)
- Velvet Fingers (1920)
- The Sky Ranger (1921)
- Hurricane Hutch (1921)
- Speed (1922)
- Plunder (1923)
- Into the Net (1924)
- The Heart of a Siren (1925)
- Play Ball (1925)
- Moran of the Mounted (1926)
- Stick to Your Story (1926)
- The Demon (1926)
- For Alimony Only (1926)
- The House Without a Key (1926)
- Corporal Kate (1926)
- The Isle of Forgotten Women (1927)
- On Guard (1927)
- Hawk of the Hills (1927)
- The Noose (1928)
- The Yellow Cameo (1928)
- Beware of Blondes (1928)
- The Battle of the Sexes (1928)
- Riley the Cop (1928)
- The Tiger's Shadow (1928)
- Out with the Tide (1928)
- Virgin Lips (1928)
- The Charge of the Gauchos (1928)
- The Royal Rider (1929)
- The Delightful Rogue (1929)
- Those Who Dance (1930)
- Women Everywhere (1930)
- The Lion and the Lamb (1931)
- Dishonored (1931)
- Night Beat (1931)
- Sally of the Subway (1932)
- Sin's Pay Day (1932)
- Vanity Street (1932)
- South of the Rio Grande (1932)
- Young Blood (1932)
- The Wyoming Whirlwind (1932)
- Texas Buddies (1932)
- Drum Taps (1933)
- The Thrill Hunter (1933)
- Damaged Lives (1933)
- The Meanest Gal in Town (1934)
- The Revenge Rider (1935)
- Three Little Beers (1935)
- I'll Name the Murderer (1936)
- Movie Maniacs (1936)
- Under Two Flags (1936)
- Half Shot Shooters (1936)
- Disorder in the Court (1936) – District Attorney (uncredited)
- The Gladiator (1938)
- Wee Wee Monsieur (1938)
- The Marines Are Here (1938)
- Three Little Sew and Sews (1939)
- Ninotchka (1939) Gurganov (uncredited)
- Overland Mail (1939)
- Dutiful But Dumb (1941)
- A Yank on the Burma Road (1942)
- Back from the Front (1943)
- Dizzy Pilots (1943)
- Sailor's Holiday (1944)
- The Unseen (1945) Hurdy Gurdy Man (uncredited)
