= Sailor's Holiday (1944 film) =

1944 film

- Directed by: William Berke
- Written by: Manuel Seff
- Produced by: Wallace MacDonald
- Starring: Arthur Lake; Jane Lawrence; Bob Haymes
- Cinematography: Burnett Guffey
- Edited by: Paul Borofsky
- Music by: Morris Stoloff
- Production company: Columbia Pictures
- Distributed by: Columbia Pictures
- Release date: February 24, 1944
- Running time: 60 minutes
- Country: United States
- Language: English

Sailor's Holiday is a 1944 American comedy film directed by William Berke and starring Arthur Lake, Jane Lawrence and Bob Haymes. It was produced and distributed by Columbia Pictures.

== Cast ==
- Arthur Lake as 'Marblehead' Tomkins
- Jane Lawrence as Clementine Brown
- Bob Haymes as Bill Hayes
- Shelley Winters as Gloria Flynn
- Lewis Wilson as Jerome 'Iron Man' Collins
- Edmund MacDonald as Fred Baxter
- Ann Miller as Ann Miller
- Vi Athens as Maid
- Eddie Bruce as Radio Announcer
- Heinie Conklin as Air Raid Warden
- Harry Depp as Photographer
- Jack Evans as Mug
- George Ford as Ronald Blair
- Jack Gordon as Wolfman
- Harrison Greene as Justice of the Peace
- Dick Jensen as Policeman Swing
- Eddie Laughton as Guard
- Pat O'Malley as Studio Guide
- Joe Palma as King's Guard
- Herbert Rawlinson as Director
- Harry Semels as King's Guard
- Ben Taggart as Director
- Harry Tenbrook as Laundry Man
- Nick Thompson as Indian
- George Tyne as Assistant Director
- John Tyrrell as Guard
- Blackie Whiteford as Mug
- Mary Zavian as Hedy Lamarr's Double

== Bibliography ==
- Erickson, Hal. Military Comedy Films: A Critical Survey and Filmography of Hollywood Releases Since 1918. McFarland, 2012.
