= Back from the Front =

1943 film by Jules White

- Directed by: Jules White
- Written by: Ewart Adamson; Jack White
- Produced by: Jules White
- Starring: Moe Howard; Larry Fine; Curly Howard; Stanley Blystone; Vernon Dent; Bud Jamison; Heinie Conklin; Lew Davis; George Gray; Jack "Tiny" Lipson; Harry Semels; Al Thompson; Adele Mara; Sally Cairns; Ruth Skinner
- Cinematography: John Stumar
- Edited by: Edwin H. Bryant
- Distributed by: Columbia Pictures
- Release date: May 28, 1943 (U.S.)
- Running time: 17:52
- Country: United States
- Language: English

Back from the Front is a 1943 short subject directed by Jules White starring American slapstick comedy team The Three Stooges (Moe Howard, Larry Fine and Curly Howard). It is the 70th entry in the series released by Columbia Pictures starring the comedians, who released 190 shorts for the studio between 1934 and 1959.

== Plot ==
The Stooges bid farewell to their romantic partners and enlist in the Merchant Marines to contribute to the war effort. While aboard ship, they experience seasickness and engage in a brief altercation with Lieutenant Dungen (later revealed as a Nazi spy). When a torpedo penetrates the hull of the ship and intrudes into their space, the Stooges mistake it for a whale and Moe commands its destruction, resulting in an unexpected explosion.

Lost at sea for an extended duration, the Stooges encounter the SS Schicklgruber, where they clandestinely board the vessel. Amidst their time adrift, they had grown full beards. Encountering Lieutenant Dungen once more, they remain unrecognized due to their altered appearances. Realizing the presence of German sailors aboard, they engage in a covert operation to overpower the crew, ultimately assuming control of the ship by forcing the sailors overboard.

== Cast ==
=== Credited ===
- Moe Howard as Moe
- Larry Fine as Larry
- Curly Howard as Curly

=== Uncredited ===
- Stanley Blystone as German Captain
- Neal Burns as German Sailor
- Sally Cairns as Tizzy
- Heinie Conklin as German Sailor
- Vernon Dent as Lt. Dungen
- Hubert Diltz as German Sailor
- Lew Davis as German Sailor
- Kit Guard as Crewman
- George Gray as German Sailor
- Bud Jamison as German Petty Officer
- Johnny Kascier as German Officer
- Sam Lufkin as German Sailor
- Jack "Tiny" Lipson as Heavyset German Sailor
- Adele Mara as Dizzy
- Ruth Skinner as Lizzy
- Harry Semels as German Sentry
- Al Thompson as German Sailor

== Production notes ==
Back from the Front was filmed over four days on July 24–28, 1942. This film marked an innovation for the Stooge franchise, introducing a distinctive sound effect to accompany the eye poke gag. The incorporation of a "TWANG" sound effect accompanying Moe's action of poking Lieutenant Dungen in the eyes distinguished this film from its predecessors.

Subsequent Stooge films experimented with different sound effects to enhance comedic moments. Throughout 1943 and 1944, varying degrees of success were achieved with alternative sound effects. For instance, in Higher Than a Kite, a nose honk sound effect was utilized, albeit inappropriately. Similarly, in Crash Goes the Hash, a xylophone sound effect was integrated into comedic sequences.

The film series found consistency in its use of specific sound effects post-1945. The sound of a ukulele or violin string being plucked became a staple, frequently employed to accentuate comedic moments.

Moe reprises his Adolf Hitler role from You Nazty Spy! and I'll Never Heil Again. The end was satire, with Moe telling the Nazis to use their heads and shoot out their brains, to which Stanley Blystone replies, "But mein Führer, we're Nazis. We have no brains." When the Hitler-disguised Moe sneezes and his toothbrush moustache flies off his face, he gets it back and refers to it as "my personality".

"Schicklgruber" is the surname Adolf Hitler's father, Alois Hitler carried for the first 40 years of his life, until he took the name Hitler (Hiedler) from his stepfather. While Adolf Hitler himself never carried the surname, the British made use of it for propaganda purposes since even to Germans, the name is laughable. The Stooges used it numerous times as the only name by which they would refer to Hitler.
