= Punch Drunks =

1934 film by Lou Breslow

- Directed by: Lou Breslow
- Screenplay by: Jack Cluett
- Story by: Moe Howard; Larry Fine; Curly Howard
- Produced by: Jules White
- Starring: Moe Howard; Larry Fine; Curly Howard; Chuck Callahan; Dutch Hendrian; Frank Moran; William Irving; Jack "Tiny" Lipson; Dorothy Granger; Al Hill; Billy Bletcher; Arthur Housman; Larry McGrath; George Gray; A.R. Heysel; Harry Watson
- Cinematography: Henry Freulich
- Edited by: Robert Carlisle
- Distributed by: Columbia Pictures
- Release date: July 13, 1934 (U.S.)
- Running time: 17:29
- Country: United States
- Language: English

Punch Drunks is a 1934 short subject directed by Lou Breslow starring American slapstick comedy team The Three Stooges (Moe Howard, Larry Fine and Jerry Howard). It is the second entry in the series released by Columbia Pictures starring the comedians, who released 190 short subjects for the studio between 1934 and 1959.

In 2002, Punch Drunks became the first Stooge film to be selected for preservation in the United States National Film Registry by the Library of Congress as being "culturally, historically, or aesthetically significant".

== Plot ==
Moe, a struggling boxing manager, has a lunchtime confrontation with three of his fighters, who are angry that he has not paid them and threaten to abandon him. The disgruntled fighters begin physically bullying their timid waiter, Curly. A serendipitous turn of events unfolds when strolling violinist Larry plays the melody of "Pop Goes the Weasel". The tune triggers a violent outburst from Curly, who becomes hyperanimated and effortlessly knocks out all three fighters. When Curly recovers his composure, he explains to Moe that "every time I hear that 'weasel' tune, something pops inside of me." Moe recruits Curly as a boxer and hires Larry to play the tune ringside so Curly can easily defeat his opponents and win them prize money.

As Curly undergoes rigorous training under Moe's guidance, a chance encounter with a stranded female motorist interrupts their routine. Despite Moe's admonition against entanglements with women, Curly aids the young lady by lifting her car from a ditch, propelled by the musical accompaniment provided by Larry.

Adopting the moniker "K.O. Stradivarius," Curly ascends to prominence in the boxing arena, positioning himself as the leading contender for the heavyweight championship. However, on the eve of the title match, Moe discovers Curly in the company of the lady, prompting a stern reprimand and a directive to focus solely on the impending bout.

The championship showdown ensues, with reigning titleholder Killer Kilduff asserting his dominance by swiftly knocking Curly out of the ring, so that he falls on Larry's violin and breaks it. Desperate to revive Curly's fighting spirit, Larry runs from the arena onto the street on a frantic quest to procure an alternative means of playing the tune. While Kilduff mercilessly pummels Curly, Larry finds a radio broadcasting the tune and hurries back to the arena with it.

Though the music revitalizes Curly, his momentum is lost when the radio abruptly shifts its broadcast, interrupting the crucial musical accompaniment and tilting the scales in Kilduff's favor once more. An infuriated Moe smashes the radio over Larry's head and sends him out to find another means to provide the desired melody. Ultimately, Larry commandeers a politician's campaign truck that is playing the tune, drives back to the arena, and crashes in through the wall just as Curly has been knocked down and is about to be counted out. Curly is energized once again and easily knocks Kilduff out to win the championship, then accidentally knocks out Moe and Larry as the music keeps playing.

== Cast ==
=== Credited ===
- Moe Howard as Moe
- Larry Fine as Larry
- Jerry Howard as Curly (K.O. Stradivarius)
- Dorothy Granger as Curly's girlfriend

=== Uncredited ===
- Chuck Callahan as Mr. McGurn
- Dutch Hendrian as spokesman mug
- Frank Moran as 3rd mug in restaurant (with cut over eye)
- Al Hill as Killer Kilduff
- William Irving as Killer Kilduff's fight manager
- Billy Bletcher as ring announcer
- Larry McGrath as referee
- Arthur Housman as timekeeper
- Harry Watson as gumball-throwing boy
- Jack "Tiny" Lipson as spectator seated next to Curly's girlfriend
- Charles King as man who falls off moving truck

== Production and significance ==
The story for Punch Drunks was developed by the Stooges, credited as "Jerry Howard, Larry Fine, and Moe Howard" and the actual screenplay was by Jack Cluett. According to Moe, the initial treatment of the script was originated by him; on its strength, the studio decided to produce the Stooges' next film sooner than scheduled. Filming was completed May 2–5, 1934.

In 2002, Punch Drunks was selected for preservation in the United States National Film Registry by the Library of Congress as being "culturally, historically, or aesthetically significant", the only Stooge film to achieve such an honor.

== Notes ==
- Punch Drunks was originally titled A Symphony of Punches but was changed before its release. The title Punch Drunks comes from the expression "punch drunk", referring to any fighter who has been hit so many times he is unsteady on his feet. Punch Drunks was remade with Shemp Howard in 1945 as A Hit with a Miss. The plot device of gaining uncontrollable strength after hearing "Pop Goes the Weasel" was reworked with Joe DeRita in the Stooges' 1963 feature film The Three Stooges Go Around the World in a Daze.
- A colorized version of this film was released in 2004 as part of the DVD collection Goofs on the Loose.
- The short is notable as being one of the few in which the Stooges are not an established trio at the beginning of the film.
- Curly's first "woo-woo-woo!", done when Larry first plays "Pop Goes the Weasel", ended up being reused as a stock overdub in several future Stooge shorts featuring Curly.
- This is the first film in which Curly calls himself a "victim of soycumstance!" (circumstance): this comment would become one of Curly's catch-phrases.
- When the Stooges are taking part in Curly's first workout as a boxer (rowing down the street), Larry is playing a tune on his violin that sounds akin to "Let's Fall in Love", a song sung 23 years later by the character Tiny (Muriel Landers) in the Stooge film Sweet and Hot. Larry plays the song before he loses his balance and falls, causing Moe to push him backwards, ending up in a shallow lake. Larry, who has hidden behind the door of the dressing room, suddenly appears, attempting to play a snippet of the same song, later on in the film for the young lady in the dressing room before Moe angrily uses a bucket of water to put on his head, to tell him to go upstairs to the arena.
- Character actor Charles King, who played the man standing on the back of the truck, broke his leg during the fall.
- The short ends with the playing of the song "Pop Goes the Weasel", which would become the opening theme for the short Pop Goes the Easel.
- This is the first of several films in which a normally passive Curly sees, hears, or smells something that triggers a violent reaction from him. The idea would be reused in Horses' Collars, Grips, Grunts and Groans, and Tassels in the Air.
- The boxing option in The Three Stooges video game is based on this short.
- This was also the first of 9 shorts that featured Larry Fine playing his violin.
- Over the course of their 24 years at Columbia Pictures, the Stooges were occasionally cast as separate characters, with this being one such occurrence (the boys start out in separate roles and end up working together).
- During the fight, when Larry is seen running down the street, Curly's voice can be heard in the distance saying, "Run! All the way!" After a few seconds, he also says ‘Then come back!’ This happens twice in the film. This was a mistake in production and was left in.
- As the referee is introducing challenger Curly, an audience member gestures obscenely at the camera.
- Larry's running down the street is sped up for comic effect, with postproduction sounds of rapid footsteps added. His frantic driving of the van, with its speakers booming out "Pop Goes the Weasel" (the same recording as on the radio earlier), is also sped up.
- This film features a rare scene in which Moe smacks someone other than one of his two pals; as several people begin to rub Curly down after a rather painful round of boxing and accidentally pull Moe into it, he slaps one of them in the back of the head.
- The opening title music, "I Thought I Wanted You," composed by Archie Gottler (who directed the previous Stooge film, Woman Haters) and Edward Eliscu, is unique to this and next Stooge film, Men in Black.
- Originally, the song "Stars and Stripes Forever" was going to be used, but the producer did not want to pay royalties, so the song "Pop Goes the Weasel" was selected because it was in the public domain.
- A snippet of Punch Drunks appears in the Eddie Murphy comedy Daddy Day Care.
- The Stooges receive "story" credit for the short, with Curly credited under his real name; they did not actually write the script. The story was submitted by Moe, and he added Larry and Curly's names in consideration of his partners. The "screenplay" was written by Jack Cluett.
- One repeated gag occurs when Moe sees a young boy in the audience and asks for a piece of hard candy so that he could throw it at the bell, causing it to ring and stop the fight, saving Curly by the bell. The kid repeatedly does the throwing, thus keeping Curly in the ring.
