= Jean De Briac =

French actor (1891–1970)

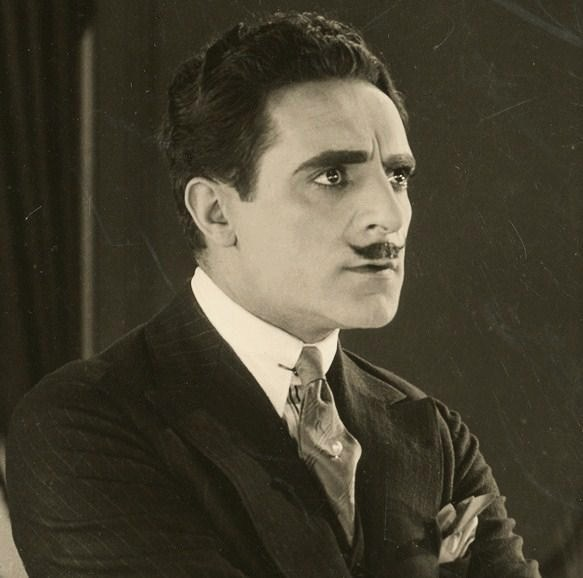
- Jean De Briac in The Frisky Mrs. Johnson (1920)
- Born: Jean-Frederic Weitler; 15 August 1891; Paris, France
- Died: 18 October 1970 (aged 79); Los Angeles, California, U.S.
- Resting place: Valley Oaks Memorial Park
- Occupation: Actor
- Years active: 1920–1962

Jean De Briac (born Jean-Frederic Weitler, 15 August 1891 – 18 October 1970) was a French film actor. He appeared in more than 120 films between 1920 and 1962. He was born in France and died in Los Angeles, California. He immigrated to the United States in 1915.

== Selected filmography ==
- The Frisky Mrs. Johnson (1920)
- The Love Light (1921)
- High Heels (1921)
- The Butterfly Girl (1921)
- The Lady from Longacre (1921)
- The Power of Love (1922)
- Another Man's Shoes (1922)
- One Wonderful Night (1922)
- Around the World in Eighteen Days (1923)
- The Marriage Market (1923)
- The Iron Man (1924)
- Paris at Midnight (1926)
- The Duchess of Buffalo (1926)
- The Ladybird (1927)
- Blotto (1930)
- Be Big! (1931)
- The New Adventures of Tarzan (1935)
- Wise Girl (1937)
- Swiss Miss (1938)
- Wee Wee Monsieur (1938)
- Tassels in the Air (1938)
- A Chump at Oxford (1940)
- Enemy Agent (1940)
- Appointment in Berlin (1943)
- Half Past Midnight (1948)
