= Harrison Greene =

American actor (1884–1945)

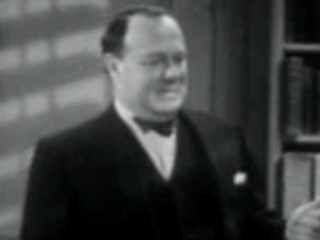
- Greene in Mr. Boggs Steps Out (1938)
- Born: January 18, 1884; Portland, Oregon, U.S.
- Died: September 28, 1945 (aged 61); Los Angeles, California, U.S.
- Occupation: Actor
- Years active: 1931–1945
- Spouse: Katherine Parker

Harrison Greene (January 18, 1884 – September 28, 1945) was an American film actor. He appeared in more than 230 films between 1931 and 1945. The son of a jeweler, Greene was born in Portland, Oregon, but grew up in California. He was a director in addition to performing in vaudeville. He was married to actress Katherine Parker. They performed together as "a team of refined vaudeville entertainers that it would be hard to beat."

== Selected filmography ==
- Damaged Lives (1933)
- Central Airport (1933)
- Jail Birds of Paradise (1934)
- St. Louis Woman (1934)
- Sea Spoilers (1936)
- Ants in the Pantry (1936)
- Senor Jim (1936)
- Ticket to Paradise (1936)
- Dick Tracy (1937)
- Grips, Grunts and Groans (1937)
- The Gladiator (1938)
- Down on the Farm (1938)
- New Frontier (1939)
- Tennessee Johnson (1942)
- Sailor's Holiday (1944)
