= 3 Dumb Clucks =

1937 film by Del Lord

- Directed by: Del Lord
- Written by: Clyde Bruckman
- Produced by: Jules White
- Starring: Moe Howard; Larry Fine; Curly Howard; Lucille Lund; Frank Mills; Eddie Laughton; Cy Schindell; Al Thompson; Harry Tenbrook; Lew Davis
- Cinematography: André Barlatier
- Edited by: Charles Nelson
- Distributed by: Columbia Pictures
- Release date: April 17, 1937 (U.S.)
- Running time: 16:49
- Country: United States
- Language: English

3 Dumb Clucks is a 1937 short subject directed by Del Lord starring American slapstick comedy team The Three Stooges (Moe Howard, Larry Fine and Curly Howard). It is the 22nd entry in the series released by Columbia Pictures starring the comedians, who released 190 shorts for the studio between 1934 and 1959.

== Plot ==
The incarcerated Stooges receive a letter from their mother, detailing the sudden windfall of their father (portrayed by Curly Howard in a dual role). The letter describes the elder Curly's sudden affluence courtesy of an oil strike, his subsequent abandonment of their mother, and his impromptu engagement to a covetous, youthful blonde named Daisy. Prompted by filial duty and a desire to thwart the ill-fated union, the Stooges break out of prison and embark on a mission to disrupt the impending marriage.

However, complications ensue as the physical resemblance between Curly and his father results in Daisy inadvertently betrothing herself to the wrong individual. Subsequently, the trio discovers that Daisy has arranged with a pair of killers to murder Curly immediately after the wedding, thus securing the elder Curly's fortune for the widowed Daisy and her criminal accomplices.

After the marriage ceremony, the elder Curly belatedly arrives for his wedding, confounding the killers as their intended victim seems to be in two places at once. After Curly eludes his antagonists, the Stooges attempt to escape further peril by exiting through a window onto the rooftop, where they climb to the top of a flagpole. Their odyssey culminates in their fall onto the street below. They land on their father, knocking him unconscious, and they escort him back home.

== Cast ==
=== Credited ===
- Curly Howard as Curly Howard and Pop Howard
- Larry Fine as Larry Fine
- Moe Howard as Moe Howard

=== Uncredited ===
- Frank Austin as Prison Guard
- Lynton Brent as Hat Salesman
- Lew Davis as Wedding Guest
- Charles Dorety as Wedding Guest
- William J. Irving as Minister
- Eddie Laughton as Chopper's Henchman
- Frank Mills as Chopper
- Lucille Lund as Daisy
- Cy Schindell as Wedding Guest
- Harry Tenbrook as Henchman guarding stairs
- Al Thompson as Pop's Butler
- Elaine Waters as Wedding Guest

== Production notes ==
Filming for 3 Dumb Clucks commenced between February 1 and 5, 1937. It is a send-up of the feature film Three Smart Girls.

This is the third of sixteen Stooge shorts using the word "three" in the title, however, 3 Dumb Clucks is the only one to use the numeral "3". It was reworked in 1953 as Up in Daisy's Penthouse, using minimal stock footage from the original.

During the scene where Curly's father arrives for his wedding, two of the gold digger's henchmen dispose of him by throwing him down an elevator shaft. The prop men had padded the bottom of the shaft to cushion Curly's fall, but neglected to cover a protruding 2 in × 4 in (51 mm × 102 mm) panel. Curly was thrown down the shaft quickly, and landed head-first on the panel, tearing his scalp open. As the Stooges were workhorses at Columbia Pictures, Curly was not taken to the hospital. Instead, the studio physician was rushed to the set to apply several stitches to Curly's scalp. Some fresh hair was glued over the wound, and with a healthy dose of painkillers, the slightly wobbly Stooge was back in action within a few hours.
