= Movie Maniacs =

1936 American short film by Del Lord

- Directed by: Del Lord
- Written by: Felix Adler
- Produced by: Jules White
- Starring: Moe Howard; Larry Fine; Curly Howard; Mildred Harris; Kenneth Harlan; Bud Jamison; Harry Semels; Heinie Conklin
- Cinematography: Benjamin H. Kline
- Edited by: William Lyon
- Distributed by: Columbia Pictures
- Release date: February 20, 1936 (U.S.)
- Running time: 17:13
- Country: United States
- Language: English

Movie Maniacs is a 1936 short subject directed by Del Lord starring American slapstick comedy team The Three Stooges (Moe Howard, Larry Fine and Curly Howard). It is the 13th entry in the series released by Columbia Pictures starring the comedians, who released 190 shorts for the studio between 1934 and 1959.

== Plot ==
The Stooges are stowaways aboard a boxcar bound for Hollywood, envisioning themselves as future movie stars although they lack any qualifications. They trespass into a movie studio, where the studio boss, who is awaiting the arrival of three New York executives poised to assume control, mistakes the Stooges for the executives and grants them complete authority over film production. The trio's tenure begins on a tumultuous note when they arrive noisily onto a set where a romantic drama is being filmed, destroying the scene and angering the director. Tensions mount as Moe repeatedly interrupts the filming to complain that there is too little action, while Larry and Curly, in a quest for more dynamic performances, annoy the actors by manipulating them like puppets. This prompts the departure of key personnel, leaving the trio to assume acting roles themselves.

Their charade unravels when the studio receives a telegram from the genuine executives, explaining that their arrival has been delayed. Realizing that the Stooges are imposters, the studio boss and the film's crew angrily pursue them. The trio inadvertently take refuge in a lion's den, from which they attempt a hasty escape into a nearby car, but a lion follows them into the vehicle before they drive chaotically away.

== Cast ==
=== Credited ===
- Moe Howard as Moe
- Larry Fine as Larry
- Curly Howard as Curly
- Mildred Harris as Leading lady
- Kenneth Harlan as Leading man
- Bud Jamison as Fuller Rath
- Harry Semels as Cecil Z. Swinehardt, Director

=== Uncredited ===
- Heinie Conklin, Blackie Whiteford as studio guards
- Jack Kenney as Fuller Rath's assistant
- Charlie Phillips as surveyor
- Elaine Waters as "Marie," maid actress
- Hilda Title as script girl
- Lois Lindsey as Moe's kissing partner
- Althea Henley as Larry's kissing partner
- Eve Reynolds as Curly's kissing instructor
- Eddie Laughton as grip
- Tanner The Lion as Lion
- Jackie The Lion as Lion
- Antrim Short as cameraman
- Charlie Phillips as assistant cameraman
- Harry Tenbrook as lighting technician
- Lew Davis as boom operator
- George Gray, Harry Keatan, Bert Young, Charles Dorety as studio crewman
- John Barrymore as Himself (photograph)

== Production notes ==
Movie Maniacs was released on February 20, 1936, only two weeks after the previous release, Ants in the Pantry. It was filmed, though, in October 1935, two months before Ants in the Pantry.

The sign at the studio gate reads "Carnation Pictures: From Contented Actors" The gag refers to Carnation milk, which was long advertised as "from contented cows."

The railroad boxcar at the beginning of the short reads "C. M. & St. P. R.R." which alludes to the Milwaukee Road. The railroad was bankrupt when this short was released (its first bankruptcy was 1925.)

The scene with the Stooges demonstrating kissing techniques was deleted when originally released to television in 1958 by Columbia Studio's television distribution subsidiary Screen Gems, as it was deemed too risqué for children's programming. Home video versions present the completed film with the scene intact.

The original ending involved the Stooges setting fire to the movie set and fleeing the site.

The lions seen at the end of the short were named "Tanner" and "Jackie", both trained by Mel Koontz. The two lions were previously used as Metro-Goldwyn Mayer's mascot. The two would appear in other Stooges shorts (Tanner being the most frequent of the two).
