= Playing the Ponies =

1937 American short film by Charles Lamont

- Directed by: Charles Lamont
- Screenplay by: Al Giebler; Elwood Ullman; Charlie Melson
- Story by: Irv Frisch; Will Harr
- Produced by: Jules White
- Starring: Moe Howard; Larry Fine; Curly Howard; Nick Copeland; Lew Davis; Billy Bletcher; William Irving; Jack "Tiny" Lipson
- Cinematography: Allen G. Siegler
- Edited by: Charles Hochberg
- Distributed by: Columbia Pictures
- Release date: October 15, 1937 (U.S.)
- Running time: 17:07
- Country: United States
- Language: English

Playing the Ponies is a 1937 short subject directed by Charles Lamont starring American slapstick comedy team The Three Stooges (Moe Howard, Larry Fine and Curly Howard). It is the 26th entry in the series released by Columbia Pictures starring the comedians, who released 190 shorts for the studio between 1934 and 1959.

== Plot ==
The Stooges operate a struggling restaurant, the Flounder Inn, but dream of quitting the business and finding their fortune in horse racing. Two unscrupulous patrons, who own a decrepit racehorse named Thunderbolt, overhear the Stooges discussing their ambitions, and seize the opportunity to trade their horse for something of value. They casually mention to the Stooges that they own a champion racehorse but have tired of their exciting careers and would prefer the quiet life of a restaurateur. The Stooges eagerly trade their eatery in exchange for Thunderbolt.

Upon arriving at Thunderbolt's stable, the trio is confronted with the dismal sight of a swaybacked horse. Moe tells Curly to race Thunderbolt around the track – a command that Curly interprets literally, running alongside the horse and beating him to the finish line. However, when mistakenly fed spicy chili pepperino snacks in place of peanuts, Thunderbolt is galvanized into a frenzied dash towards relief at the sight of water.

Undeterred by the unexpected turn of events, the Stooges perceive the pepperinos as a potent racing stimulant, envisioning them as a strategic advantage in future competitions. They enter Thunderbolt in a race, during which his erratic behavior necessitates an impromptu intervention involving motorcycle-mounted Stooges dangling a bucket of water ahead of the horse.

Thunderbolt emerges victorious, securing a triumphant outcome for the Stooges. In the closing scene, they revel in their newfound success, indulging in a feast of turkey while the horse feasts on oats.

== Production notes ==
Playing the Ponies was filmed on May 12–19, 1937. The film title is a straightforward slang expression meaning "betting on racehorses." It is the second and final Stooges film directed by veteran director Charles Lamont.

A colorized version of this film was released in 2004 as part of the DVD collection entitled "Goofs on the Loose."

Nick Copeland and Lew Davis reprise their roles from the last short, Cash and Carry as two con men who once again try to swindle the Stooges.

== See also ==
- List of films about horses
- List of films about horse racing
