= Gents Without Cents =

1944 film by Jules White

- Directed by: Jules White
- Written by: Felix Adler
- Produced by: Jules White
- Starring: Moe Howard; Larry Fine; Curly Howard; Lindsay Bourquin; Laverne Thompson; Betty Phares; Judy Malcolm; John Tyrrell; Lew Davis; Lynton Brent
- Cinematography: Benjamin H. Kline
- Edited by: Charles Hochberg
- Distributed by: Columbia Pictures
- Release date: September 22, 1944 (U.S.)
- Running time: 19:02
- Country: United States
- Language: English

Gents Without Cents is a 1944 short subject directed by Jules White and starring American slapstick comedy team The Three Stooges (Moe Howard, Larry Fine and Curly Howard). It is the 81st of 190 Stooge shorts released by Columbia Pictures.

== Plot ==
The Stooges are vaudevillians rehearsing a comedy sketch in their apartment. Faced with the obstacle of noisy neighbors upstairs disrupting their rehearsals, the trio go to confront them but unexpectedly encounter three talented dancers, Flo, Mary, and Shirley (played by acrobatic dancers Lindsay Bourquin, Laverne Thompson, and Betty Phares, who are billed simply as "Lindsay, Laverne, Betty"). A fortuitous friendship ensues, leading the group to seek representation from talent agent Manny Weeks.

Weeks is unimpressed at first because the trio sings a corny song called "We Just Dropped In to Say Hello". He brightens when they start a more up-to-date, jazzy nonsense scat-singing number called "Rat-tat-toodle-oodle-day-ay". Weeks gives them a chance to entertain defense workers at the Noazark Shipbuilding Company. Their physical-comedy "Slowly I Turned" routine captivates the audience, propelling the Stooges and their newfound friends into the spotlight when they offer to replace the scheduled headliners.

Weeks, impressed by their performance, extends an offer to the Stooges for a Broadway debut. Amid the whirlwind of opportunities, the Stooges grapple with the prospect of leaving their romantic partners behind, ultimately culminating in a series of nuptials and a chase scene reminiscent of their "Slowly I Turned" routine.

== Production notes ==
"Slowly I Turned" is an old burlesque sketch introduced by veteran comic Joey Faye and used by many comedians including Abbott and Costello: a derelict goes crazy every time he hears a certain word or phrase, and assaults the innocent bystander who said the word. The Stooges' version, in which the trigger phrase is "Niagara Falls", was filmed in 1943 for the feature film Good Luck, Mr. Yates, but the scene was cut at the last minute. Instead of wasting the footage, producer-director Jules White built Gents Without Cents around it. The new scenes were filmed June 14–16, 1944.

Gents Without Cents is the first Stooge film to employ a syncopated, jazzy version of "Three Blind Mice" as the Stooges' theme song. The new version is in the key of F, while the key of G was previously utilized. This syncopated version would be used briefly after the next film, No Dough Boys. This version was revamped during the Shemp Howard and Joe Besser era. The title is a play on "without sense." Other parodies include The Noazark (Noah's Ark) Shipbuilding Company and show headliners, the Castor and Earle (castor oil) Revue.

The theatrical agent's sign lists business locations as "New York, Chicago, London ... Berlin soon". This film was released just a few months after D-Day, at a time when Allied forces were making steady advances. The scat-singing part of the Stooges' audition includes parodies of Hideki Tōjō (Larry), Benito Mussolini (Curly), and Adolf Hitler (Moe). Television broadcasts of this short in the 2020s often cut Larry's culturally insensitive Japanese imitation.

An obvious flub was left in the short at approximately 12:27 (the end of the "Niagara Falls" routine) as Larry misses the line "step-by-step", going directly to "inch by inch" while Moe says the line correctly. It is unclear why director Ray Enright left the mistake in; using an alternate, correct take would have taken only a few minutes, unless he felt such a mistake would be consistent with the amateur entertainment Howard, Fine, and Howard were supposed to be providing in the short.

== See also ==
- List of American films of 1944
