= I Can Hardly Wait =

1943 film by Jules White

- Directed by: Jules White
- Written by: Clyde Bruckman
- Produced by: Jules White
- Starring: Moe Howard; Larry Fine; Curly Howard; Al Thompson; Bud Jamison; Lew Davis; Adele Mara
- Cinematography: John Stumar
- Edited by: Charles Hochberg
- Distributed by: Columbia Pictures
- Release date: August 13, 1943 (U.S.)
- Running time: 18:27
- Country: United States
- Language: English

"I Can Hardly Wait" is a 1943 short subject directed by Jules White starring American slapstick comedy team The Three Stooges (Moe Howard, Larry Fine and Curly Howard). It is the 73rd entry in the series released by Columbia Pictures starring the comedians, who released 190 shorts for the studio between 1934 and 1959.

== Plot ==
The Stooges are defense workers at the Heedlock Airplane Corp. (a pun on the Lockheed Aircraft Corporation). Their late night feast begins with a mistaken attempt to crack open a refrigerator, believing it to be a safe, leading to a humble late-night meal of ham, egg, bread, and coffee. Curly's misfortune strikes when he breaks a tooth on the ham bone, resulting in a severe toothache.

After dinner, the Stooges settle into a bunk bed arrangement, with Curly occupying the top tier. Amidst mishaps and failed attempts to alleviate Curly's pain, the scene transitions into his dream, where his incessant complaints about his toothache prompt his comrades to resort to unconventional home dentistry methods. These include using a fishing pole, tying the tooth to a doorknob, suspending it from a ceiling light, and even resorting to a firecracker.

The dream culminates in a visit to the dentist, Dr. Tug, where Curly's fear and resistance complicate the examination. Exhausted, Dr. Tug delegates the task to his partner, Dr. Yank, who mistakenly administers anesthesia to Moe instead of Curly. This leads to a mix-up where Moe undergoes the tooth extraction instead. Upon realizing the error, Moe awakens to find Curly holding the extracted tooth, sparking his ire and resulting in a chaotic scuffle.

Curly begins flailing in his sleep, causing the bunk bed to collapse, sending the Stooges tumbling amidst the wreckage. Moe's frustration culminates in a punch to Curly's jaw, inadvertently dislodging the troublesome tooth. With the ordeal concluded, the trio settles back to sleep amidst the chaos of their collapsed bunk bed.

== Cast ==
- Moe Howard as Moe
- Larry Fine as Larry
- Curly Howard as Curly
- Lew Davis as Dr. Y. Tug
- Bud Jamison as Dr. A. Yank
- Adele Mara as Secretary
- Al Thompson as Patient

== Production notes ==
"I Can Hardly Wait" was filmed on March 15–18, 1943. It is a remake of the 1928 Laurel and Hardy silent short film Leave 'Em Laughing. The film title is officially listed with quotation marks (as "I Can Hardly Wait"), as it represents a phrase Curly repeats throughout the film. The first two malapropistic lines of Curly’s song ("She was bred (bread) in Old Kentucky/But She's only a crumb up here") is also the name of the song the Stooges performed as “Nill, Null, and Void” in the film Loco Boy Makes Good.

As "I Can Hardly Wait" was filmed during World War II, it contains references to wartime activities and propaganda, such as the Stooges working on fighter planes as defense workers and Moe’s reasoning for the dentist to have Curly’s broken tooth removed: “Listen, doc, we're defense workers. If you wanna cut down on absenteeism, yank this guy’s tooth! He won’t let us sleep, he’s sabotaging the war effort!”
