= Tassels in the Air =

1938 American short film by Charley Chase

- Directed by: Charley Chase
- Written by: Al Giebler; Elwood Ullman
- Produced by: Charley Chase; Hugh McCollum
- Starring: Moe Howard; Larry Fine; Curly Howard; Vernon Dent; Symona Boniface; Bess Flowers; Bud Jamison; Victor Travers; Jean De Briac; Gertrude Astor
- Cinematography: Allen G. Siegler
- Edited by: Art Seid
- Distributed by: Columbia Pictures
- Release date: April 1, 1938 (U.S.)
- Running time: 17:04
- Country: United States
- Language: English

Tassels in the Air is a 1938 short subject directed by Charley Chase starring American slapstick comedy team The Three Stooges (Moe Howard, Larry Fine and Curly Howard). It is the 30th entry in the series released by Columbia Pictures starring the comedians, who released 190 shorts for the studio between 1934 and 1959.

== Plot ==
Nouveau riche housewife Mrs. Smirch (Bess Flowers) has intentions to hire the in-demand interior decorator Omay (Jean De Briac) to redecorate her house in a bid for admittance to the "who's who" of the local rich elite. Omay accepts her offer.

Meanwhile, the Stooges are hired as painters to redecorate the building where Omay's office is and are given the job of painting temporary names on the doors of all the offices. They, of course, botch the job. It comes out that Curly has a strange proclivity to fly into a blind rage whenever he sees a tassel, placated only with soft tickling of his chin.

Mrs. Smirch enters the building and mistakes Moe for Omay (as Moe's name in Pig Latin is Oe-may). The real Omay, offended that his office was mislabeled as the janitor's closet, gives up his lease. The boys' boss (Vernon Dent) immediately fires them, then steps through the doorway of what he thinks is his office and falls down an elevator shaft. The Stooges assume the identity of Omay and his two colleagues with intention of doing the work on the Smirch residence. They arrive there and begin to work as Mrs. Smirch entertains a few of her new rich friends. However, the real Omay enters the home and exposes the boys as frauds, publicly embarrassing Mrs. Smirch.

Moe has gotten Mr. Smirch out of the way by asking him to "mix up a batch of spotted paint". Mr. Smirch is seen several times trying to fulfill this request—and is last seen bringing in a Dalmatian dog.

== Production notes ==
Tassels in the Air was filmed on November 26–30, 1937. The film's title is a play on the old expression, "Building castles in the air," i.e. dreaming of achieving the impossible.

Curly exhibits an uncontrollable reaction whenever he encounters tassels, a condition remedied by tickling him under the chin with a paintbrush. This comedic device parallels similar motifs employed in earlier shorts Punch Drunks (1934), Horses' Collars (1935), and Grips, Grunts and Groans (1937).

Several comedic elements featured in the table painting sequence were originally employed by director Charley Chase in his short Luncheon at Twelve (1933). These gags were later repurposed by Moe, Larry, and Shemp in their unaired television pilot Jerks of All Trades (1949), which notably also included actress Symona Boniface. The same material would be reused once more in A Snitch in Time (1950).
