= Slippery Silks =

1936 American short film by Preston Black

- Directed by: Preston Black
- Written by: Ewart Adamson
- Produced by: Jules White
- Starring: Moe Howard; Larry Fine; Curly Howard; Symona Boniface; Vernon Dent; William Irving; Eddie Laughton; Jack "Tiny" Lipson; June Gittelson; Lew Davis
- Cinematography: Benjamin H. Kline
- Edited by: William A. Lyon
- Distributed by: Columbia Pictures
- Release date: December 27, 1936 (U.S.)
- Running time: 17:15
- Country: United States
- Language: English

Slippery Silks is a 1936 short subject directed by Preston Black starring American slapstick comedy team The Three Stooges (Moe Howard, Larry Fine and Curly Howard). It is the 19th entry in the series released by Columbia Pictures starring the comedians, who released 190 shorts for the studio between 1934 and 1959.

== Plot ==
The Stooges are furniture craftsmen tasked with replicating a priceless antique Chinese cabinet owned by a local museum. Mr. Morgan, the courier who delivers the cabinet to the Stooges' workshop, is assured by the trio's boss that the valuable artifact is in competent hands. However, Curly's carelessness with a bandsaw results in calamitous damage to the cabinet, followed by Moe's accidental destruction of the remaining fragments. Fleeing from the wrathful Mr. Morgan, who threatens reprisal, the trio discovers an unexpected inheritance: ownership of the Madame de France boutique, a high-end fashion establishment formerly owned by their late Uncle Pete.

Seamlessly transitioning into the fashion industry, the Stooges draw inspiration from their carpentry background, concocting women's attire that resembles bizarre furniture. Their foray into fashion reaches its zenith when they are commissioned to stage a fashion show, an event orchestrated by none other than Mrs. Morgan Morgan, the spouse of their previous antagonist. Upon Mr. Morgan's arrival, he promptly identifies the Stooges as the culprits responsible for the demise of his cabinet and unleashes a violent assault, primarily upon Curly.

In the ensuing chaos, Moe's attempt to intervene with a pastry triggers a chain reaction, escalating into a melee involving the entire assembly. The pandemonium ends when the Stooges are clubbed unconscious by female attendees wielding mannequin appendages.

== Production notes ==
Slippery Silks was filmed from June 10 to June 15, 1936. The film represents the Stooges' first genuine pie and pastry altercation. Although it involves predominantly cream puffs, a pie becomes inadvertently launched amidst the chaos when Curly obstructs Moe's trajectory while attempting to retrieve a "lucky penny", resulting in him being struck in the face with a pie. It is noteworthy that the earliest prefiguration of a pie fight in a Stooges short occurred in Pop Goes the Easel (1935), wherein sculptor's clay is employed as a substitute projectile hurled at unsuspecting individuals.

Moe Howard stated in his autobiography that over 150 pies were thrown. In Moe's June 8, 1973, appearance on The Mike Douglas Show, he revealed to Douglas that, in making the Stooge pie-fight scenes, he was responsible for most of the pie-throwing, remarking: "the studio auditors claimed I had saved them tens of thousands of dollars with my accuracy in the pie throw." The pie fight scenes were used in the Muppet Babies episode, "Good, Clean, Fun".

"Preston Black" was a pseudonym used for a time by Jack White (brother of producer Jules White), who had been in a nasty divorce and was trying to shield income from his ex-wife.

The ending theme of "Listen to the Mockingbird" features different instrumentation.
