= Lew Davis =

American actor (1884–1948)

- Davis in The Three Stooges film Playing the Ponies (1937)
- Born: Louis Davis; July 16, 1884; Buffalo, New York; U.S.
- Died: January 13, 1948 (aged 63); Inglewood, California; U.S.
- Occupation: Actor
- Years active: 1916–1948
- Spouse: Kathryn West (m. 1908–1948)

Louis Davis (July 16, 1884—January 13, 1948) was an American film actor. He appeared in over 75 films between 1916 and 1948.

== Career ==
A New York native, Davis appeared in his first film in 1916. He began to achieve fame after arriving at Columbia Pictures, appearing in several Three Stooges shorts including Slippery Silks, Dizzy Doctors and Three Little Sew and Sews. His most memorable appearance was as a con man in Cash and Carry and Playing the Ponies. A versatile character actor, Lewis often appeared as villains, waiters, soldiers, lawyers, et al.

== Death ==
Davis died of a gastric hemorrhage on January 13, 1948, in Inglewood, California. His wife Kathryn survived him by 47 years and died on January 17, 1995. Both are buried in Inglewood Park Cemetery.

== Partial filmography ==
- Soul Mates (1916) - Sherman's Confidential Secretary
- Pack Up Your Troubles (1932) - Bank Clerk (uncredited)
- The Captain Hates the Sea (1934) - Deck Steward (uncredited)
- Behind the Evidence (1935) - Waiter (uncredited)
- The Whole Town's Talking (1935) - Ship Steward (uncredited)
- Pop Goes the Easel (1935, Short) - Art Student (uncredited)
- Uncivil Warriors (1935, Short) - Union Orderly (uncredited)
- The Girl Who Came Back (1935) - Sims (uncredited)
- Three Little Beers (1935, Short) - Golfer on 18th Tee (uncredited)
- If You Could Only Cook (1935) - Waiter (uncredited)
- Ants in the Pantry (1936, Short) - Guest in riding gear w / moustache (uncredited)
- The Little Red Schoolhouse (1936) - Mac, Pete's Henchman
- The Crime Patrol (1936) - Bar Customer (uncredited)
- Whoops, I'm an Indian! (1936, Short) - Saloon Patron (uncredited)
- Slippery Silks (1936, Short) - Lawyer (uncredited)
- Half Shot Shooters (1936, Short) - Lawyer (uncredited)
- Grips, Grunts and Groans (1937, Short) - Henchman (uncredited)
- Dizzy Doctors (1937, Short) - Driver Who Gives Curly a Ride (uncredited)
- 3 Dumb Clucks (1937, Short) - Wedding Guest (uncredited)
- The Devil Is Driving (1937) - Bit Part (uncredited)
- Goofs and Saddles (1937, Short) - Cheating Poker Player (uncredited)
- Cash and Carry (1937, Short) - Con-Man (uncredited)
- Playing the Ponies (1937, Short) - Con Man (uncredited)
- I'll Take Romance (1937) - Sailor (uncredited)
- She Married an Artist (1937) - Steward (uncredited)
- All American Sweetheart (1937) - Waiter (uncredited)
- Start Cheering (1938) - Candy Vendor on Train (uncredited)
- The Main Event (1938) - Ticket Seller (uncredited)
- City Streets (1938) - Waiter (uncredited)
- You Can't Take It with You (1938) - Reporter (uncredited)
- The Spider's Web (1938, Short) - Harry Stone (uncredited)
- Tarnished Angel (1938) - Nightclub Waiter (uncredited)
- Adventure in Sahara (1938) - Steward (uncredited)
- The Little Adventuress (1938) - Counter Man (uncredited)
- Three Little Sew and Sews (1939, Short) - Party Guest (uncredited)
- The Lone Wolf Spy Hunt (1939) - Heavy (uncredited)
- Only Angels Have Wings (1939) - Shorty - Mechanic (uncredited)
- Mr. Smith Goes to Washington (1939) - Senate Clerk (uncredited)
- Nutty but Nice (1940, Short) - Pedestrian #2 (uncredited)
- The Great Dictator (1940) - Hospital Orderly (uncredited)
- Dutiful But Dumb (1941)
- Let's Make Music (1941) - Waiter (uncredited)
- So Long Mr. Chumps (1941, Short) - Laughing Pedestrian (uncredited)
- Meet John Doe (1941) - Electrician (uncredited)
- Penny Serenade (1941) - New Year's Party Guest (uncredited)
- Bedtime Story (1941) - Stagehand (uncredited)
- The Remarkable Andrew (1942) - Bit Role (uncredited)
- Sing Your Worries Away (1942) - Taxi Driver (uncredited)
- Mexican Spitfire at Sea (1942) - Ship's Waiter (uncredited)
- So's Your Aunt Emma (1942) - Cigar Counterman (uncredited)
- Dr. Broadway (1942) - Weasel-faced Man (uncredited)
- They All Kissed the Bride (1942) - Employee at Dance (uncredited)
- Three Smart Saps (1942, Short) - Gambler (uncredited)
- The Talk of the Town (1942) - Waiter at Regina's Shop (uncredited)
- Even as IOU (1942, Short) - Race Announcer (uncredited)
- Murder in Times Square (1943) - Reporter (uncredited)
- Gildersleeve's Bad Day (1943) - Juror (uncredited)
- The More the Merrier (1943) - Man Entering Elevator (uncredited)
- Back from the Front (1943, Short) - German Sailor (uncredited)
- Gals, Incorporated (1943) - Waiter (uncredited)
- I Can Hardly Wait (1943, Short) - Dr. Y. Tug (uncredited)
- The Adventures of a Rookie (1943) - Winch Operator (uncredited)
- Casanova in Burlesque (1944) - Driver (uncredited)
- Meet the People (1944) - Ritz Patron (uncredited)
- Gents Without Cents (1944, Short) - Audience Member (uncredited)
- One Mysterious Night (1944) - Exhibit Attendee (uncredited)
- The Big Show-Off (1945) - Waiter with Trash (uncredited)
- Rockin' in the Rockies (1945) - Assistant Croupier (uncredited)
- Boston Blackie's Rendezvous (1945) - Man in Ticket Line (uncredited)
- Along Came Jones (1945) - Stagecoach Passenger (uncredited)
- Incendiary Blonde (1945) - Clown (uncredited)
- Kitty (1945) - Fishhawker (uncredited)
- An Angel Comes to Brooklyn (1945) - Waiter (uncredited)
- Uncivil War Birds (1946, Short) - Soldier with ants (uncredited)
- Holiday in Mexico (1946) - Waiter (uncredited)
- Vacation in Reno (1946) - Desk Clerk at Bar Nothing Ranch (uncredited)
- Boston Blackie and the Law (1946) - Reporter (uncredited)
- It's a Wonderful Life (1946) - High School Teacher at Poolside (uncredited)
- The Thirteenth Hour (1947) - Truck Driver (uncredited)
- The Son of Rusty (1947) - Bored Townsman at Speech (uncredited)
- State of the Union (1948) - Reporter (uncredited)
- The Gallant Blade (1948) - Bit (uncredited) (final film role)
