= Cash and Carry (film) =

1937 American short film by Del Lord

- Directed by: Del Lord
- Screenplay by: Clyde Bruckman; Elwood Ullman
- Story by: Clyde Bruckman
- Produced by: Jules White
- Starring: Moe Howard; Larry Fine; Curly Howard; Sonny Bupp
- Cinematography: Lucien Ballard
- Edited by: Charles Nelson
- Music by: Louis Silvers
- Distributed by: Columbia Pictures
- Release date: September 3, 1937
- Running time: 18:21
- Country: United States
- Language: English

Cash and Carry is a 1937 short subject directed by Del Lord starring American slapstick comedy team The Three Stooges (Moe Howard, Larry Fine and Curly Howard). It is the 25th entry in the series released by Columbia Pictures starring the comedians, who released 190 shorts for the studio between 1934 and 1959.

== Plot ==
Upon their return to their humble abode in the city dump following six months of fruitless prospecting, the Stooges discover that an orphaned young woman and her incapacitated younger brother, Jimmy, have taken up residence in their shack. Despite initial reservations, the Stooges demonstrate compassion upon realizing Jimmy's physical challenges, with Curly even offering assistance with his studies.

While rummaging around in the dump in search of a replacement for their deflated car tire, Curly finds a can brimming with coins. This cache of coins, termed "canned coin" by Curly, leads to a frenzied search through discarded cans in pursuit of further treasures. However, upon learning that the money belongs to Jimmy's sister, who has been saving her meager wages to provide funds for Jimmy's operation, the Stooges' hearts soften. They embark on a mission to augment the sum required for Jimmy's surgery.

The Stooges explore the possibility of accruing interest on their modest sum in a bank account, but are disillusioned to learn that it will take longer than a century to achieve their financial goal. Their predicament worsens when they fall victim to two confidence men who abscond with their $62 worth of savings and their automobile in exchange for a treasure map. The Stooges enthusiastically venture to the indicated location marked on the map. Following a series of mishaps, they inadvertently breach the walls of the United States Treasury. Mistakenly believing they have struck gold, they begin to unearth stacks of currency, only to find themselves swiftly apprehended by the authorities.

Their escapade ultimately leads them into an unexpected encounter with President Franklin D. Roosevelt, who, upon learning of Jimmy's plight, extends a presidential pardon to the Stooges and offers to cover the expenses for Jimmy's much-needed surgery.

== Cast ==
=== Credited ===
- Curly Howard as Curly
- Larry Fine as Larry
- Moe Howard as Moe

=== Uncredited ===
- Sonny Bupp as Jimmy
- Nick Copeland as Confidence Man 1
- Lew Davis as Confidence Man 2
- Lester Dorr as President's Secretary
- John Ince as Vault Chief
- Eddie Laughton as Desk Clerk
- Al Richardson as President Franklin D. Roosevelt
- Cy Schindell as Vault Guard
- Harlene Wood as Jimmy's Sister

== Production notes ==
Involving the Stooges as miners helping a crippled orphan get money for his leg surgery, this film is notable for showing an uncharacteristically sentimental side to the comedy team. Filmed on May 4–8, 1937, the title Cash and Carry was a popular saying of the era. From 1942 to 1945, during the marriage of actor Cary Grant and heiress Barbara Hutton, tabloid newspapers referred to Grant and Hutton as "Cash and Cary".

Writer Clyde Bruckman's story was later adapted for comedian Andy Clyde in his short films A Miner Affair (1945) and Two April Fools (1954).

Nick Copeland and Lew Davis would reprise their roles as con men who swindle the Stooges in the next entry, Playing the Ponies.
