= Grips, Grunts and Groans =

1937 American short film by Preston Black

- Directed by: Preston Black
- Screenplay by: Clyde Bruckman
- Story by: Searle Kramer; Herman Boxer
- Produced by: Jules White
- Starring: Moe Howard; Larry Fine; Curly Howard; Harrison Greene; Chuck Callahan; Casey Columbo; Tony Chavez; Herb Stagman; William J. Irving; Cy Schindell; Blackie Whiteford; Elaine Waters; Lew Davis
- Cinematography: Benjamin H. Kline
- Edited by: Charles Nelson
- Distributed by: Columbia Pictures
- Release date: January 15, 1937 (U.S.)
- Running time: 18:44
- Country: United States
- Language: English

Grips, Grunts and Groans is a 1937 short subject directed by Preston Black starring American slapstick comedy team The Three Stooges (Moe Howard, Larry Fine and Curly Howard). It is the 20th entry in the series released by Columbia Pictures starring the comedians, who appeared in 190 shorts for the studio between 1934 and 1959.

== Plot ==
Following their evasion of railroad authorities, the Stooges forge an acquaintance with Ivan Bustoff, a renowned wrestler embroiled in a high-stakes match orchestrated by his mob-affiliated trainers. Despite the trainers' wager on Bustoff's victory, his predilection for revelry leads to an inebriated stupor, jeopardizing his performance. In a bid to salvage the situation, the mob coerces the Stooges into managing Bustoff and ensuring his sobriety for the impending bout.

However, a mishap in the locker room results in a series of dumbbells falling on Bustoff's head, rendering him unconscious. Fearing the mob's wrath, the panicked Stooges substitute Curly for Bustoff by cutting off the wrestler's beard and pasting it onto Curly. Leveraging Curly's susceptibility to Wild Hyacinth perfume-induced aggression, Moe and Larry devise a strategy to exploit this peculiarity to their advantage. Yet, Curly's performance in the ensuing wrestling match falls short of expectations. Amid mounting pressure from the mobsters, who threaten the Stooges with dire consequences if Curly fails to secure victory, Moe seizes an opportunity to acquire Wild Hyacinth perfume from a spectator. Moe applies the fragrance to Curly, whose violent response incapacitiates the challenger, the referee, and various ringside attendants, culminating in Curly's own knockout.

== Cast ==
- Moe Howard as Moe
- Larry Fine as Larry
- Curly Howard as Curly
- Harrison Greene as Ivan Bustoff
- Chuck Callahan as Tony
- Casey Columbo as Ironhead
- Cy Schindell as Waiter
- William J. Irving as Waiter
- Tony Chavez as Kid Pinky
- Herb Stagman as Referee
- Blackie Whiteford as Mugg
- Elaine Waters as Girl with perfume
- Lew Davis as Tony's henchman
- Everett Sullivan as Policeman on telephone
- Ella McKenzie, Al Thompson, Pat West, Johnny Kascier, Betty McMahon, Solomon Horwitz as Spectators

== Production notes ==
The filming of Grips, Grunts and Groans took place from October 30 to November 5, 1936. Its title parodies the expression "gripes, grunts and groans."

An external stimulus that causes Curly to go berserk was also used as a plot element in Punch Drunks, Horses' Collars, and Tassels in the Air.

A production still shows that Solomon Horwitz — father to Moe, Curly and Shemp Howard — appeared as a spectator during the wrestling scenes.
