= Half Shot Shooters =

1936 American short film by Preston Black

- Directed by: Preston Black
- Written by: Clyde Bruckman
- Produced by: Jules White
- Starring: Moe Howard; Larry Fine; Curly Howard; Stanley Blystone; Vernon Dent; Edward LeSaint; Harry Semels; Heinie Conklin; Lew Davis
- Cinematography: Benjamin H. Kline
- Edited by: Charles Hochberg
- Distributed by: Columbia Pictures
- Release date: April 30, 1936 (U.S.)
- Running time: 18:28
- Country: United States
- Language: English

Half Shot Shooters is a 1936 short subject directed by Preston Black starring American slapstick comedy team The Three Stooges (Moe Howard, Larry Fine and Curly Howard). It is the 14th entry in the series released by Columbia Pictures starring the comedians, who released 190 shorts for the studio between 1934 and 1959.

== Plot ==
Employing a bifurcated temporal structure, the film opens with the Stooges asleep in a foxhole on the final day of World War I in 1918. Upon receiving news of the armistice, their superior, Sgt. MacGillicuddy, discovers the trio asleep and gives the shirkers a severe beating. As a result, when the trio reports to headquarters for their discharge papers they receive medals ostensibly for "wounds in action". Afterwards, the Stooges encounter Sgt. MacGillicuddy on the street and, now liberated from military discipline, physically assault him with gusto.

The plot then transitions to the year 1935, where the Stooges find themselves destitute and hungry on the streets. In search of a job, they accidentally enlist in the army and are alarmed to find themselves under the purview of none other than Sgt. MacGillicuddy. Their arrival at an army base coincides with a mishap involving tomatoes that culminates in MacGillicuddy's reassignment to menial duties.

Subsequently assigned to coastal artillery duty, the Stooges demonstrate their ineptitude, wreaking havoc by targeting unintended objects, including a smokestack, a house, a bridge, and the flagship of a navy admiral. Confronted by MacGillicuddy and a contingent of officers, the Stooges find themselves blamed for the mishap, prompting a comically futile attempt to assign blame amongst themselves.

Feigning approval of the Stooges' performance, MacGillicuddy directs them to stand together as if posing for a photograph. He then fires a deck gun, leaving behind three pairs of smoking boots.

== Production notes ==
Half Shot Shooters was filmed on March 18–21, 1936. The film's title is a pun on Half Shot at Sunrise (1930), an RKO Radio Pictures movie with Wheeler & Woolsey.

This film marked the inaugural appearance of Vernon Dent, who appeared in more Stooge shorts than any other supporting actor. It also marked the final appearance of the old Columbia Pictures logo of a woman bearing a torch during the credits.

Unusually for one of their films, the Three Stooges are killed at the end of Half Shot Shooters. This plot device was used sporadically through their films, also being implemented in 1939's Three Little Sew and Sews, You Nazty Spy! and I'll Never Heil Again among others.

Dick Wessel had a minor role as a gunnery soldier but made his first appearance as a character in 1947's Fright Night (Shemp Howard's return).

Half-Shot Shooters has been criticized for its sadistic violence executed against the Stooges, with MacGillicuddy breaking Moe's arm, deafening all three, and then killing them at the conclusion.

== Quotes ==
- Officer: "Where were you born?!"
- Curly: (unable to hear him) "He says your pants are torn!"
- Moe: "I ain't got any horn!"
- Larry: "No, not warn! Corn!"
- Curly: "What?"
- Larry: "CORN!"
- Curly: "Oh, corn! I got two on both dogs!" (to the officer) "Can you tell where I can get a corn plaster, shorty?"
- Officer: "Were you born in this country?"
- Larry: "What?"
- Officer: "Were you born in this country?!"
- Larry: "No, Milwaukee."
- Officer: "Would you fight for this great republic and-"
- Moe: "Republican? Naw, I'm a Democrat!"
- Curly: "Not me! I'm a pedestrian."
