= Flat Foot Stooges =

1938 American short film by Charley Chase

- Directed by: Charley Chase
- Written by: Charley Chase
- Produced by: Charley Chase; Hugh McCollum
- Starring: Moe Howard; Larry Fine; Curly Howard; Dick Curtis; Lola Jensen; Chester Conklin; Heinie Conklin; Al Thompson
- Cinematography: Lucien Ballard
- Edited by: Art Seid
- Distributed by: Columbia Pictures
- Release date: December 5, 1938 (U.S.)
- Running time: 15:25
- Country: United States
- Language: English

Flat Foot Stooges is a 1938 short subject directed by Charley Chase starring American slapstick comedy team The Three Stooges (Moe Howard, Larry Fine and Curly Howard). It is the 35th entry in the series released by Columbia Pictures starring the comedians, who released 190 shorts for the studio between 1934 and 1959.

== Plot ==
The trio are firemen at Engine Company No. 1, a venerable institution reliant on horse-drawn fire engines and they often mistake the sound of alarm clock and telephone for a fire alarm. A conflict emerges when a dubious salesman, Mr. Reardon, attempts to persuade Fire Chief Kelly of the obsolescence of horse-powered engines, only to face rejection. Undeterred, Reardon resorts to nefarious means, clandestinely entering the fire station and dropping a canister of gunpowder into the fire engine's boiler. The chief's daughter witnesses his act and confronts him, threatening to notify her father.

During a struggle, Reardon is knocked unconscious. A duck alights on a nearby windowsill and, having swallowed spilled gunpowder, lays an egg that explodes upon falling to the floor. The shock causes the chief's daughter to strike her head, rendering her unconscious as well, while the explosion ignites a fire that engulfs the station.

Amidst this chaos, the Stooges, having diverted the firehorses to a Turkish bath, are ill-prepared to respond to the fire alarm. Belatedly realizing that the blaze is located within their own station, the trio races to the fire and arrives in the nick of time to rescue the chief's daughter from the inferno. Reardon, who has jumped from a window, runs to escape violent retribution from the Stooges.

== Production notes ==
Filmed on October 25–28, 1938, the title Flat Foot Stooges is a pun on the 1938 jazz song "Flat Foot Floogie (with a Floy Floy)".

A rarity among Stooge shorts, the boys are shown reciting dialogue incorrectly on several occasions, a result of director Charley Chase's rushed directing style. Chase rarely stopped for retakes in an effort to finish a film ahead of schedule.

When Larry slides down the fire pole and is accidentally punched by Moe, he calls himself a "victim of circumstance". This marks the first time a Stooge other than Curly says the line.

Upon realizing they are heading in the wrong direction, Curly quips "Hey, we're doing the Corrigan!", a reference to aviator Douglas "Wrong Way" Corrigan. Corrigan had recently returned from a transcontinental flight from Floyd Bennett Field in Brooklyn, New York to Long Beach, California. Instead of returning to New York, he bypassed it, and headed to Ireland.

Flat Foot Stooges marks the first usage of "Three Blind Mice" as the Stooges' title theme. However, this was not put to permanent use until We Want Our Mummy.
