= Wee Wee Monsieur =

1938 American short film by Del Lord

- Directed by: Del Lord
- Written by: Searle Kramer
- Produced by: Jules White
- Starring: Moe Howard; Larry Fine; Curly Howard; Vernon Dent; William Irving; Bud Jamison; Harry Semels; John Lester Johnson; Jean De Briac; Alex Novinsky; Eugene Borden; Ethelreda Leopold; Tanner The Lion
- Cinematography: André Barlatier
- Edited by: Charles Nelson
- Distributed by: Columbia Pictures
- Release date: February 18, 1938 (U.S.)
- Running time: 17:38
- Country: United States
- Language: English

Wee Wee Monsieur is a 1938 short subject directed by Del Lord starring American slapstick comedy team The Three Stooges (Moe Howard, Larry Fine and Curly Howard). It is the 29th entry in the series released by Columbia Pictures starring the comedians, who released 190 shorts for the studio between 1934 and 1959.

== Plot ==
The Stooges, Moe, a sculptor, Larry, a music composer, and Curly, a painter, find themselves ensnared in a sequence of events in Paris, France. Threatened with incarceration due to overdue rent, they inadvertently enlist in the French Foreign Legion, misconstruing it for the American Legion. Deployed to a desert outpost, their mission involves safeguarding Captain Gorgonzola from local threats. When the captain is abducted, the Stooges, seizing an opportunity for redemption, embark on a mission.

Disguised as Santa Claus, complete with sleigh and reindeer, the Stooges infiltrate the fortress housing the captive captain. Despite the failure of their ruse to deceive, they swiftly incapacitate a confronting guard, gaining ingress to the stronghold. Within, they discover Captain Gorgonzola ensnared by the nefarious Sheikh Tsimmis, who seeks to barter Legion munitions for opulent treasures and a concubine retinue.

Compelled to adopt another guise, the Stooges assimilate into the sheikh's harem, utilizing a dance interlude to subdue him and his chief aide. During their subsequent escape, they blunder into a lion's den. Through Curly's resourcefulness, the peril is averted, as the lion facilitates their journey back to camp upon a wagon.

== Cast ==
=== Credited ===
- Moe Howard as Moe
- Larry Fine as Larry
- Curly Howard as Curly

=== Uncredited ===
- Jean De Briac as Gendarme
- Eugene Borden as Enlistment Officer
- Vernon Dent as Sheikh Tsimmis
- William Irving as Captain Gorgonzola
- Bud Jamison as Sergeant
- John Lester Johnson as Harem Guard
- Ethelreda Leopold as Harem Girl from Brooklyn
- Ida May as Homely Harem Girl
- Alex Novinsky as Peddler
- John Rand as Man in Street
- Harry Semels as Landlord
- Victor Travers as Pedestrian
- Tanner the Lion as Lion
- Bert Young as Palace Sentry

== Production notes ==
Wee Wee Monsieur was filmed on November 12–17, 1937. The film's title is a parody of "Oui, oui, Monsieur" (French for "Yes, sir").
