= Nutty but Nice =

1940 American short film by Jules White

- Directed by: Jules White
- Written by: Clyde Bruckman; Felix Adler
- Produced by: Jules White
- Starring: Moe Howard; Larry Fine; Curly Howard; Ned Glass; John Tyrrell; Vernon Dent; Cy Schindell; Lynton Brent; Johnny Kascier; Harry Wilson; Bert Young; Lew Davis; Evelyn Young; Ethelreda Leopold
- Cinematography: John Stumar
- Edited by: Mel Thorsen
- Distributed by: Columbia Pictures
- Release date: June 14, 1940 (U.S.)
- Running time: 17:48
- Country: United States
- Language: English

Nutty but Nice is a 1940 short subject directed by Jules White starring American slapstick comedy team The Three Stooges (Moe Howard, Larry Fine and Curly Howard). It is the 47th entry in the series released by Columbia Pictures starring the comedians, who released 190 shorts for the studio between 1934 and 1959.

== Plot ==
The Stooges are singing waiters in a restaurant where they encounter two physicians concerned about the well-being of Betty Williams, a young girl who has been made ill by grief. Betty's father, a bank cashier, has been abducted while transporting bonds valued at $300,000. Motivated by compassion, the Stooges undertake the task of locating the missing father, prompted by a description provided by the doctors: a middle-aged man with a bald spot, sporting an anchor tattoo, and standing at 5'10" in stature. Notably, the father and Betty share a penchant for yodeling, a skill Curly surprisingly demonstrates proficiency in.

The trio embarks on their mission with zeal, interrogating every potential suspect encountered along their path in their signature Stooge manner. Amid their efforts, the sound of a yodeling cowboy on the radio fortuitously leads them to the hideout of one of the kidnappers, Butch, who is monitoring the captive father. The Stooges confront Butch, subdue him, and liberate Betty's father.

Their heroic intervention is soon met with confrontation as three additional members of the gang arrive at the scene. The Stooges and the rescued father barricade themselves in a room, then use a dumbwaiter to descend to the basement. A skirmish ensues in the dark basement—lit intermittently in a series of blackout gags—ultimately culminating in victory for the Stooges, albeit leaving Curly as the sole conscious individual amidst the aftermath.

In the denouement, the father is joyously reunited with Betty, whose spirits are revived from their previous despondency. The Stooges, along with the two doctors, serenade the reunited family.

== Production notes ==
Nutty but Nice was filmed from April 27 to May 2, 1940. The film title is a play on the expression, "naughty but nice".
