= Whoops, I'm an Indian! =

1936 American short film by Del Lord

- Directed by: Del Lord
- Screenplay by: Clyde Bruckman
- Story by: Searle Kramer; Herman Boxer
- Produced by: Jules White
- Starring: Moe Howard; Larry Fine; Curly Howard; Bud Jamison; Beatrice Blinn; Al Thompson; Lew Davis; Eddie Laughton; Blackie Whiteford
- Cinematography: Benjamin H. Kline
- Edited by: Charles Hochberg
- Distributed by: Columbia Pictures
- Release date: September 11, 1936 (U.S.)
- Running time: 17:23
- Country: United States
- Language: English

Whoops, I'm an Indian! is a 1936 short subject directed by Del Lord starring American slapstick comedy team The Three Stooges (Moe Howard, Larry Fine and Curly Howard). It is the 18th entry in the series released by Columbia Pictures starring the comedians, who released 190 shorts for the studio between 1934 and 1959.

== Plot ==
The Stooges, depicted as unscrupulous gamblers residing in the antiquated Western locale of Lobo City, engage in deceitful practices during a game of roulette, unfairly swindling the townsfolk. Their ruse is uncovered, particularly by Pierre, a menacing woodcutter renowned for his formidable stature. Larry's concealment of a horseshoe magnet in his shoe facilitates their deception, leading to their exposure and subsequent flight into the wilderness. Evading capture as fugitives, the trio resorts to survivalist tactics, encompassing hunting, fishing, and assuming disguises reminiscent of Native Americans.

Complications arise when Pierre develops an affection for Curly, who is disguised as an indigenous woman. Their relationship culminates in marriage, albeit briefly, as Curly's disguise is compromised, prompting the Stooges to flee once more. Their quest for sanctuary leads them to what appears to be a secure refuge, only to realize belatedly that they have inadvertently incarcerated themselves within the confines of the Lobo City Jail.

== Production notes ==
Whoops, I'm an Indian! was filmed on June 2–6, 1936. The high-speed canoe footage was reused for the closing of 1937's Back to the Woods.
