= Uncivil War Birds =

1946 film by Jules White

- Directed by: Jules White
- Written by: Clyde Bruckman
- Produced by: Jules White
- Starring: Moe Howard; Larry Fine; Curly Howard
- Cinematography: Philip Tannura
- Edited by: Charles Hochberg
- Production company: Columbia Pictures
- Distributed by: Columbia Pictures
- Release date: March 29, 1946
- Running time: 17:31
- Country: United States
- Language: English

Uncivil War Birds is a 1946 short subject directed by Jules White starring American slapstick comedy team The Three Stooges (Moe Howard, Larry Fine and Curly Howard). It is the 90th entry in the series released by Columbia Pictures starring the comedians, who released 190 shorts for the studio between 1934 and 1959.

== Plot ==
Amidst the backdrop of the American Civil War, the Stooges inadvertently enlist in opposing factions: Moe and Larry in the Union Army, and Curly in the Confederacy. Complications arise when each faction mistakes the others as captives, leading to a series of mistaken identities and comedic misunderstandings.

As the confusion escalates, Moe and Larry, seeking to evade capture, resort to donning Confederate uniforms. However, their ruse is short-lived as they find themselves ensnared within Union army headquarters. In a bid for freedom, the trio resorts to a theatrical minstrel show performance, adopting blackface disguises. Despite the absurdity of their antics, they manage to elude their captors and escape.

Ultimately, the narrative culminates in matrimonial bliss for the Stooges as they wed their respective brides. However, the joyous occasion takes an unexpected turn when the brides promptly retaliate against their newlywed husbands with physical aggression following their first kiss when the trio accidentally spill their drinks behind their new wives backs.

== Cast ==
=== Credited ===
- Moe Howard as Moe
- Larry Fine as Larry
- Curly Howard as Curly

=== Uncredited ===
- Eleanor Counts as Ringa Belle
- Faye Williams as Mary Belle
- Marilyn Johnson as Lulu Belle
- Maury Dexter as Southern gentleman
- Victor Travers as Justice of the Peace

=== Union army ===
- Theodore Lorch as Union Colonel
- John Tyrrell as Union Sergeant
- Robert B. Williams as Union Lieutenant
- Blackie Whiteford as Union officer
- Al Rosen as Union officer
- Bobby Burns as Union soldier
- Joe Palma as Union soldier
- Cy Schindell as Union soldier
- Al Morino as Union soldier
- Harold Breen as Union soldier
- Jack Cooper as Union soldier

=== Confederate army ===
- Brian O'Hara as Confederate officer
- Lew Davis as Confederate soldier with ants
- Johnny Kascier as Confederate soldier with ants
- Heinie Conklin as Confederate soldier
- Bobby Burns as Confederate soldier

== Production notes ==
Uncivil War Birds was filmed on August 24–28, 1945. It is a remake of the 1939 Buster Keaton short Mooching Through Georgia; the stock shot of the union lieutenant on horseback with his battalion of eight was borrowed from that film. The song "Dixie" replaces the Stooges' regular opening theme of "Three Blind Mice" for this film, and continues as background music for approximately twenty seconds into the opening scene. A production error occurs when Curly is set to be executed by firing squad. When an officer attempts to blindfold him, Curly grabs the scarf and blows his nose with it but inadvertently rips off one of the fake sideburns he is wearing. Curly proceeds to throw the scarf and the sideburn prop to the ground. When Curly is shown again in the next scene, the fake sideburn is back on his face.

This short would mark the final appearances of three long-time Stooge regulars Lew Davis, John Tyrrell, and Bobby Burns, who all died in 1948, 1949 and 1966, respectively.

The blackface song and dance routine is often cut from 21st century television broadcasts of this short due to its racial insensitivity towards African-Americans.

=== Curly's illness ===
The film was produced after Curly Howard suffered a mild stroke. As a result, his performance was marred by slurred speech, and slower timing, though Curly was more energetic and displayed better timing than in previous shorts. In addition, Moe Howard and Larry Fine are paired together and given the lion's share of the film's dialogue.
