= A Ducking They Did Go =

1939 film by Del Lord

- Directed by: Del Lord
- Written by: Andrew Bennison
- Produced by: Jules White
- Starring: Moe Howard; Larry Fine; Curly Howard; Lynton Brent; Bud Jamison
- Cinematography: Lucien Ballard
- Edited by: Charles Nelson
- Distributed by: Columbia Pictures
- Release date: April 7, 1939 (U.S.)
- Running time: 16:16
- Country: United States
- Language: English

A Ducking They Did Go is a 1939 short subject directed by Del Lord starring American slapstick comedy team The Three Stooges (Moe Howard, Larry Fine and Curly Howard). It is the 38th entry in the series released by Columbia Pictures starring the comedians, who released 190 shorts for the studio between 1934 and 1959.

== Plot ==
The Stooges botch an attempt to steal a watermelon from a deliveryman (Cy Schindell), which lands them in trouble with a cop (William Irving). The trio winds up at the offices of the Canvas Back Duck Club, a hunting club run by conmen Blackie (Lynton Brent) and Doyle (Jack Gardner), where they are hired to sell club memberships. Unbeknownst to them, the whole thing is a scam. Dressed in duck-hunting gear, Moe, Larry and Curly invade the police station and barge into the office of the police chief (Bud Jamison) and sell memberships to several men, including the police chief and the mayor.

By the time the group arrives at the lodge to hunt ducks, the conmen are gone, and an old man (John Rand) assures them that there are no wild ducks to be found. Moe and Larry hurl rubber decoy ducks over the pond. Curly arrives with a flock of ducks (like the Pied Piper of Hamelin) and leads them into the water where the hunters hunt the ducks. The old man shows up with the constable (Sam Lufkin), saying that Curly has stolen all of his prize domestic ducks and it will cost the hunters $5.00 apiece to replace. The hunters, the old man, and the sheriff begin shooting at the Stooges, who flee; leaping over a bush and landing on a trio of bucking steers.

== Production notes ==
Filmed on November 15–18, 1938, the title A Ducking They Did Go is a play on the old children's song "A-Hunting We Will Go."

The closing shot of the Stooges leaping over a bush and landing on a trio of bucking steers was reused from the end of 1936's A Pain in the Pullman.
