= Ants in the Pantry =

1936 film by Preston Black

- Directed by: Preston Black
- Written by: Al Giebler
- Produced by: Jules White
- Starring: Moe Howard; Larry Fine; Curly Howard; Clara Kimball Young; Bud Jamison; Phyllis Crane; James C. Morton; Douglas Gerrard; Lew Davis; Harrison Greene; Isabelle LaMal; Anne O'Neal; Vesey O'Davoren; Althea Henley; Clarence Nash (uncredited)
- Cinematography: Benjamin H. Kline
- Edited by: William Lyon
- Distributed by: Columbia Pictures
- Release date: February 6, 1936 (U.S.)
- Running time: 17:39
- Country: United States
- Language: English

Ants in the Pantry is a 1936 short subject directed by Preston Black starring American slapstick comedy team The Three Stooges (Moe Howard, Larry Fine and Curly Howard). It is the 12th entry in the series released by Columbia Pictures starring the comedians, who released 190 shorts for the studio between 1934 and 1959.

== Plot ==
The Stooges are employed as pest exterminators. Driven by a lack of clientele, they implement a scheme wherein they both introduce the infestation and subsequently address it. They target and surreptitiously enter an affluent mansion hosting a high society dinner party, whereupon they orchestrate a calculated release of various vermin, including mice, moths, and ants. Their machinations result in their hiring to rectify the very chaos they have created, all while discreetly masquerading as guests so as not to disrupt the soirée.

Things go according to plan until Larry and Curly's concealment of mice-seeking cats within an upright piano initiates a series of events that unravel the facade of order. During a recital of Johann Strauss II's "Blue Danube Waltz", the intrusion of a mouse into the piano incites a cacophony of feline agitation. The Stooges' vigorous efforts to remove the cats from the piano destroy the instrument in its entirety. However, in a surprising turn of events, the guests interpret the Stooges' antics as entertainment and congratulate the hostess for presenting it, thereby sparing her an embarrassment.

Invited to partake in a fox hunt as further amusement, the Stooges experience a final misadventure when Curly lures a skunk he has mistaken for a fox into a sack and then brandishes it in front of Moe, Larry, and a horse, all of whom succumb to the skunk's malodorous emissions.

== Production notes ==
Ants in the Pantry was filmed on December 11–14, 1935; the film title is a pun on the phrase "ants in the pants." Moe Howard later recalled that a nest of ants actually worked their way into his pants:

There was a scene where we were having trouble selling our services, so we complain to our boss, who tells us, 'If they don't have ants, give them some. You dumbkopf!' We got the idea and went from house to house throwing moths in with minks, mice on the floor, and ants in the pantry. During the shooting, I hadn't noticed that a small container of red ants had broken apart in my pocket and the little devils were crawling down my back, in my hair, and into my pants. It was insane. All through the scene I was scratching and squirming and slapping myself on the neck and face and on the seat of my pants. Elated, director Preston Black shouted, 'Great Moe. Keep up that squirming!' It was very funny—to everyone but me.

Veteran voice actor Clarence Nash, most famous for doing Donald Duck, did the sounds of the cats in the piano.

Vesey O'Davoren appeared as Gawkins.

Ants in the Pantry was remade with Shemp Howard in 1951 as Pest Man Wins.
