= William Irving (actor) =

American actor (1893-1943)

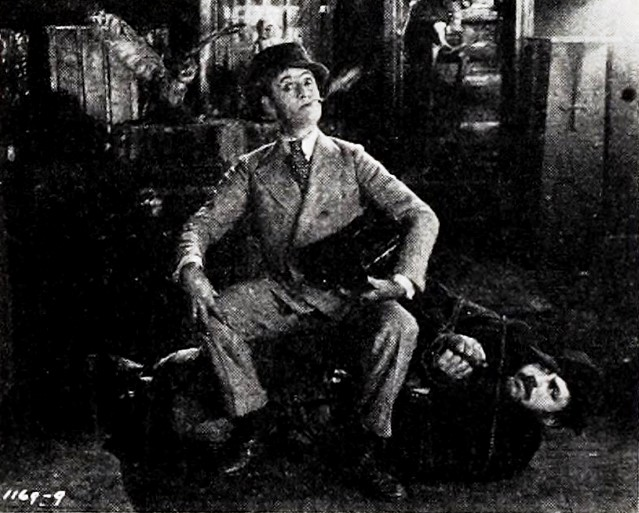
- Still from Call a Cop (1925) with Neal Burns and William Irving (reclining)
- Born: 17 May 1893; Hamburg, Germany
- Died: 25 December 1943 (aged 50); Los Angeles, California, U.S.
- Occupation: Actor
- Years active: 1916-1941

William Irving (17 May 1893 – 25 December 1943) was a German-born American film actor.

== Biography ==
The burly character actor appeared in more than 220 films between 1916 and 1941, often as a "comic heavy" in the Our Gang and Three Stooges comedy short films. Irving also appeared as a cowardly German army cook in All Quiet on the Western Front (1930). He played mostly supporting roles in the silent era, but after the introduction of sound films his appearances got noticeably smaller and he was often uncredited.

On Christmas Day 1943, Irving was crossing the street at the intersection of Hollywood Boulevard and La Brea Avenue in Los Angeles, California, when he was struck and killed by a hit and run driver. His remains were cremated at Pierce Brothers Hollywood. Irving was divorced from his wife, Mildred, at the time of his death. He was survived by a brother.

== Selected filmography ==
- Whose Baby? (1917, Short) - Harold Scull - the Rival
- Till I Come Back to You (1918) - Stroheim
- Someone Must Pay (1919) - Percy Glendenning
- The Heart of a Child (1920) - Perry
- Love's Protegé (1920) - Jack Keith
- Twin Beds (1920) - Andrew Larkin
- Someone in the House (1920) - Percy Glendenning
- Billions (1920) - Frank Manners
- Bell Boy 13 (1923) - Hotel Dining Room Guest (uncredited)
- The Love Trap (1923) - Freddie Rivers
- Gentle Julia (1923) - George Plum
- Love Letters (1924) - Don Crossland
- Pampered Youth (1925) - George Amberson
- Call of the Night (1926) - Chub Biggs
- She's My Baby (1927) - Chuck Callahan
- The Girl in the Pullman (1927) - Oscar McGuff
- Ham and Eggs at the Front (1927) - von Friml
- Coney Island (1928) - Hughey Cooper
- Red Hair (1928) - Demmy
- You're Darn Tootin' (1928, Short) - Musician
- Beautiful But Dumb (1928) - Ward
- The Cameraman (1928) - Photographer (uncredited)
- The Singapore Mutiny (1928) - Huber
- Nothing to Wear (1928) - Detective
- The Rush Hour (1928) - Seasick Shipboard Passenger (uncredited)
- The Bride of the Colorado (1928) - Fritz Mueller
- From Headquarters (1929) - Fritz
- Hearts in Exile (1929) - Rat Catcher
- Song of Love (1929) - Stage Manager (uncredited)
- On the Border (1930) - Dusty
- All Quiet on the Western Front (1930) - Ginger - the Cook (uncredited)
- Rough Waters (1930) - Bill
- Song of the Caballero (1930) - Bernardo
- The Life of the Party (1930) - The 'Yoohoo' Man (uncredited)
- A Soldier's Plaything (1930) - German Actor in Horse (uncredited)
- The Truth About Youth (1930) - Jim Greene (uncredited)
- Her Majesty, Love (1931) - Second Man in Cabaret
- Manhattan Parade (1931) - Suit of Armor (uncredited)
- State's Attorney (1932) - Drunken Tenant in Hallway (uncredited)
- Her Mad Night (1932) - Jury Foreman (uncredited)
- A Farewell to Arms (1932) - Frederic's Friend - Frustrated Opera Singer (uncredited)
- Footlight Parade (1933)
- Three Little Pigskins (1934) - photographer (uncredited)
- Mike Fright (1934)
- It Happened One Night (1934)
- Pop Goes the Easel (1935)
- Hoi Polloi (1935)
- Slippery Silks (1936)
- Mr. Deeds Goes to Town (1936)
- Grips, Grunts and Groans (1937)
- Playing the Ponies (1937)
- Wee Wee Monsieur (1938) - Captain Gorgonzola
- Ninotchka (1939)
- A Ducking They Did Go (1939)
- The Great Dictator (1940)
