= Frank Mills (American actor) =

American film and television actor

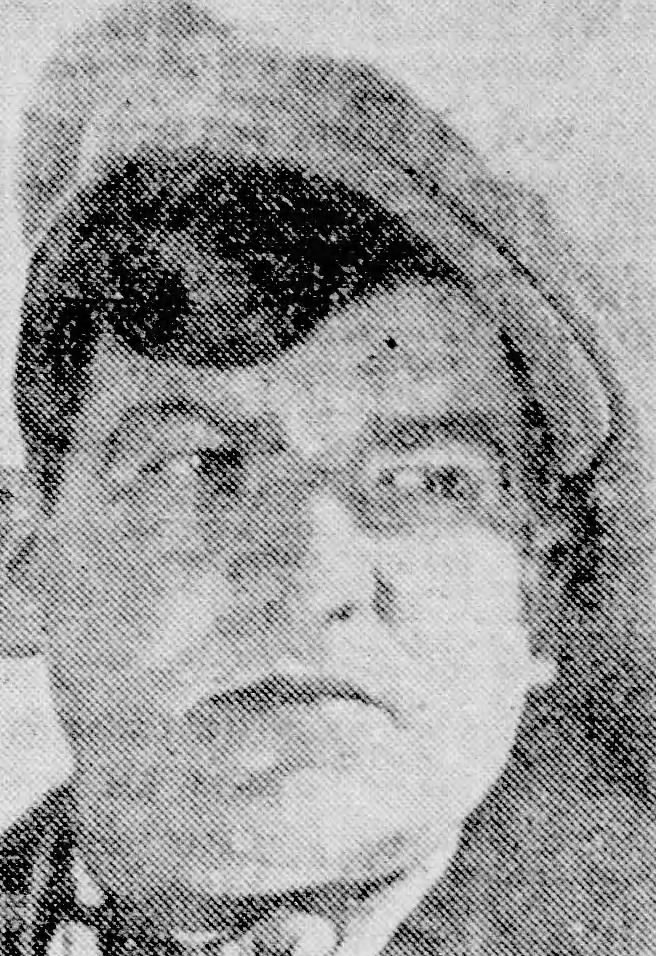
- Mills in 1927
- Born: Frank Clifford Mills; January 26, 1891; Washington, U.S.
- Died: August 18, 1973 (aged 82); Los Angeles, California, U.S.
- Occupations: Film and television actor
- Years active: 1926–1962
- Spouse: Jessie Sawtell

Frank Clifford Mills (January 26, 1891 – August 18, 1973) was an American film and television actor.

== Life and career ==
Mills was born in Washington, the son of William Mills and Ella Walker. He began his screen career in 1926, appearing in the film The Flaming Forest. In 1928, he played Frank in the film Chicago After Midnight.

Later in his career, Mills guest-starred in numerous television programs including The Twilight Zone, The Life and Legend of Wyatt Earp, Tales of Wells Fargo, Sugarfoot, The Deputy, The Lawless Years, Bonanza, Death Valley Days and Perry Mason. He also appeared in numerous films such as Chicago After Midnight, State's Attorney, Barbary Coast, Romance in the Dark, Pacific Liner, Western Union, The Fighting Kentuckian, Cry Danger, The Far Country, Somebody Up There Likes Me and Rio Bravo.

Mills retired from acting in 1962, last appearing in the western television series Gunsmoke.

== Death ==
Mills died on August 18, 1973, in Los Angeles, California, at the age of 82.
