= I'll Never Heil Again =

1941 film by Jules White

- Directed by: Jules White
- Written by: Felix Adler; Clyde Bruckman
- Produced by: Jules White
- Starring: Moe Howard; Larry Fine; Curly Howard; Don Brodie; Mary Ainslee; Vernon Dent; Bud Jamison; Lynton Brent; Jack "Tiny" Lipson; Charles Dorety; Nick Arno; Cy Schindell; Johnny Kascier
- Cinematography: L. William O'Connell
- Edited by: Jerome Thoms
- Distributed by: Columbia Pictures
- Release date: July 4, 1941 (U.S.)
- Running time: 18:12
- Country: United States
- Language: English

I'll Never Heil Again is a 1941 short subject directed by Jules White starring American slapstick comedy team The Three Stooges (Moe Howard, Larry Fine and Curly Howard). It is the 56th entry in the series released by Columbia Pictures starring the comedians, who released 190 shorts for the studio between 1934 and 1959.

== Plot ==
In the Kingdom of Moronika, deposed monarch King Herman the 6+7/8 is visited by the war profiteers Ixnay, Amscray, and Umpchay, engineers of the coup that led to his ouster. They regret their treason, and now seek to overthrow the tyrannical rule of the dictator they once supported, Moe Hailstone. To this end, they seek the assistance of the king's daughter, the princess Gilda.

Dictator Moe Hailstone meets with Field Marshal Herring (Curly) and the Minister of Propaganda (Larry). He directs them to a table set with a roast turkey on a platter, saying "our first move is to kick the stuffing out of turkey" (a parody of Hitler possibly wanting control in Turkey). Larry parodies the attempts to control Greece by saying, "I'll wipe out grease". An argument over possession of the turkey ends when a framed picture of Napoleon on the wall comes to life and absconds with the bird.

Gilda arrives in the guise of an astrologer and warns Hailstone that the stars portend treachery from Chizzilini (a parody of Italian dictator Benito Mussolini) and his other Axis partners. She leads the Stooges to a telescope in which they see a scene of themselves roasting on a spit in Hell. She then covertly replaces the 13 ball on Hailstone's pool table with an explosive ball and flees as Hailstone begins a pool game with his associates. Throughout the game, the cue ball performs impossible maneuvers to avoid hitting the explosive ball.

Hailstone summons the Axis partners to a meeting, which breaks into chaos when Hailstone seizes a world globe from the conference table and declares that the world belongs to him. A brawl erupts over possession of the globe. Finally, with the Axis partners defeated, Hailstone orders Herring to hand him the globe they had fought over. Herring refuses and smashes it over Hailstone's head, sending him into a tantrum. Still angry at Hailstone, Herring grabs the explosive Number 13 ball and throws it against the floor, blowing up the meeting room. Herman regains his throne and the taxidermied heads of the trio are repurposed as hunting trophies.

== Production notes ==
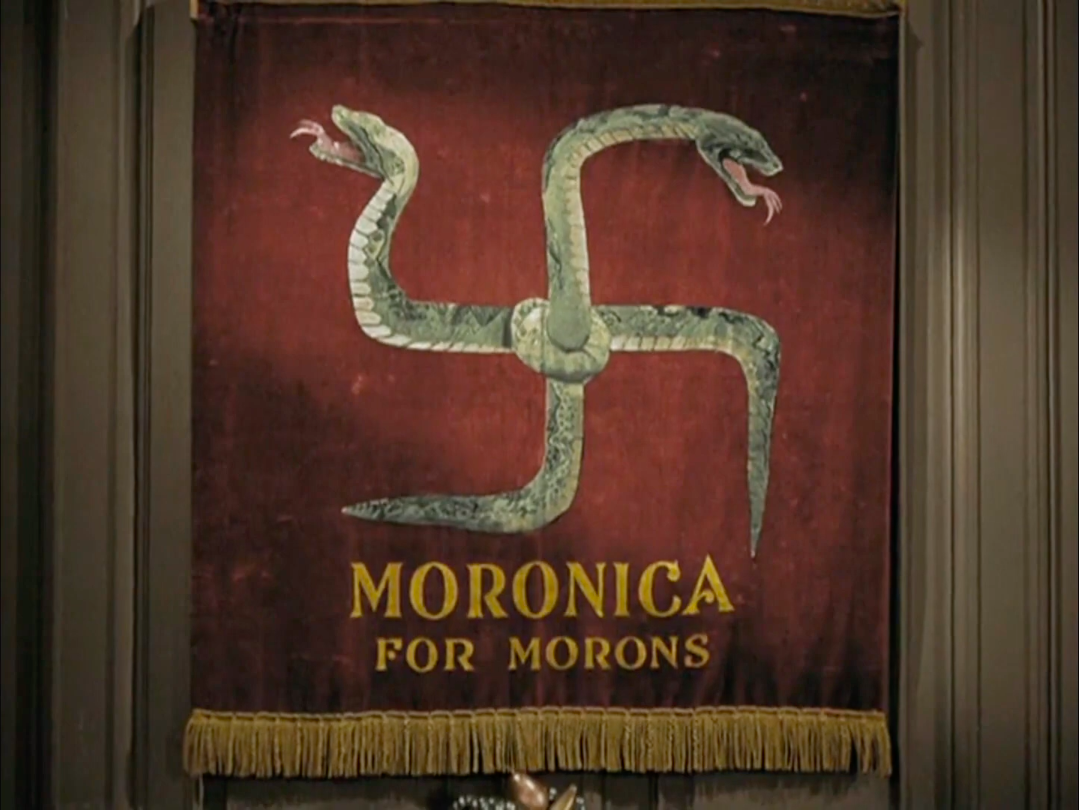
The Flag of Moronica

I'll Never Heil Again was the first sequel in the Stooge film canon, following the earlier setting in Moronica of You Nazty Spy!. It begins with Moe Hailstone firmly ensconced as the Hitler-like dictator of Moronica. Curly Howard plays Field Marshal Herring (a parody of Hermann Göring), who has so many medals that he wears them on both the front and back of his coat. Larry plays the Minister of Propaganda (a combination parody of Joseph Goebbels and to some extent also Foreign Minister Joachim von Ribbentrop). Filming commenced on April 15–18, 1941.

The film title is a parody of song title "I'll Never Smile Again", written by Ruth Lowe. It was released by Tommy Dorsey and His Orchestra featuring vocals by Frank Sinatra with The Pied Pipers in 1940. The song reached No. 1 on Billboard for 12 weeks and was inducted into the Grammy Hall of Fame in 1982.

I'll Never Heil Again marks one of the few times the Stooges break the fourth wall. In one scene, Moe Hailstone is ranting in mock German and Larry is responding in an equally mock Southern accent and Curly says to the camera: "They're nuts." One memorable scene has Hailstone's mustache being ripped off and Hailstone rants: "Give me my personality!"

While filming, devoted family man Moe rushed from the set to his daughter's birthday party in full costume. This caused a few calls to the LAPD. Bystanders reported at what they perceived to be Hitler running red lights in Hollywood.

A colorized version of this film was released in 2007. It was part of the DVD collection entitled Hapless Half-Wits.

== Historical notes ==
In the previous film on this subject, You Nazty Spy!, Hailstone is shown as a tool of arms makers. In this film, they are shown as regretting their support, reflecting the real-life fact that all groups attempting to use the Nazi movement for their own ends ended up being controlled by it.

King Herman the 6 7/8 is a caricature of Kaiser Wilhelm II in his appearance and especially his hobby of chopping wood. I'll Never Heil Again was released 5 weeks and 2 days after the real Wilhelm II died in exile.

I'll Never Heil Again premiered in Argentina in February 1942 (along with the other South American countries), but it was banned during the governments of Juan Perón (1945–1955, 1973–1974) because Perón was a sympathizer of Fascist Italy.
