= List of Three Stooges recycled shorts =

In the later years of The Three Stooges shorts, a tactic was used to cut costs by recycling footage from previous shorts. A typical example consists of using wrap-arounds: new footage is used for an opening, old footage is used for the middle, and new footage is used at the end to wrap things up.

One example is Dizzy Detectives (1943) directed by Jules White. The short incorporates a scene from Pardon My Scotch (1935) – one of the all-time most memorable scenes performed by the Stooges, in which Moe is standing on a table while Curly uses a power-saw to cut it down the middle.

Another example involves the short Husbands Beware. Moe and Larry are shown enduring the agony of married life. As such, they feel that Shemp should be married too. They decide to trick him into getting married. Cut to footage from Brideless Groom where Moe falsely tells Shemp he will inherit $500,000 if he is married by the end of the day. Shemp is married, and the short then ends with new footage of Moe and Larry telling Shemp it was all a lie because he let Moe and Larry marry his two overweight sisters and got divorced.

This was mostly done with shorts featuring Shemp Howard as the previous third stooge Curly Howard was no longer involved in production. There are, however, exceptions, especially when Joe Besser came on board, and far-away shots of Curly could sort of pass for a shot of Joe. After Shemp's death in November 1955, four entries even went so far as to use recycled footage, and a double posing as Shemp ("Fake Shemp") in his place.

Title of Original Short	Production Order	Date of Release	Title of New Short	Production Order	Date of Release	Notes
Pardon My Scotch	9	August 1, 1935	Dizzy Detectives	68	February 5, 1943	carpenter sequence
Hoi Polloi	10	August 29, 1935	In the Sweet Pie and Pie	58	October 16, 1941	dance lesson scene
Ants in the Pantry	12	February, 1936	Pest Man Wins	136	December 6, 1951	plot only; no stock footage
3 Dumb Clucks	22	April 17, 1937	Up in Daisy's Penthouse	144	February 5, 1953	plot only; minimal stock footage
Goofs and Saddles	24	July 2, 1937	Pals and Gals	155	June 3, 1954	saloon escape scene
Oily to Bed, Oily to Rise	42	October 6, 1939	Oil's Well That Ends Well	188	December 4, 1958	some plot reused; only stock shot is Curly riding the oil gusher
Boobs in Arms	52	December 27, 1940	Dizzy Pilots	74	September 24, 1943	drill sergeant sequence
In the Sweet Pie and Pie	58	October 16, 1941	Beer Barrel Polecats	88	January 10, 1946	cell block footage
In the Sweet Pie and Pie	58	October 16, 1941	Pest Man Wins	136	December 6, 1951	minimal pie fight footage
What's The Matador?	62	April 23, 1942	Sappy Bull Fighters	190	June 4, 1959	minimal stock footage used
Idiots Deluxe	85	July 20, 1945	Guns a Poppin!	179	June 13, 1957	minimal stock footage used
Half-Wits Holiday	97	January 9, 1947	Pest Man Wins	136	December 6, 1951	pie fight scenes
Half-Wits Holiday	97	January 9, 1947	Scheming Schemers	173	October 4, 1956	pie fight scenes
Half-Wits Holiday	97	January 9, 1947	Pies and Guys	185	June 12, 1958	minimal stock footage used
Fright Night	98	March 6, 1947	Fling in the Ring	159	January 6, 1955	
Out West	99	April 24, 1947	Pals and Gals	155	June 3, 1954	
Hold That Lion!	100	July 17, 1947	Booty and the Beast	145	March 5, 1953	second half of film remade
Hold That Lion!	100	July 17, 1947	Loose Loot	146	April 2, 1953	first half of film remade
Hold That Lion!	100	July 17, 1947	Tricky Dicks	147	May 7, 1953	filing cabinet sequence
Brideless Groom	101	September 11, 1947	Husbands Beware	167	January 5, 1956	
Sing a Song of Six Pants	102	October 30, 1947	Rip, Sew and Stitch	150	September 3, 1953	two thirds stock footage, one third new footage
All Gummed Up	103	December 18, 1947	Bubble Trouble	151	October 8, 1953	
Shivering Sherlocks	104	January 8, 1948	Of Cash and Hash	160	February 3, 1955	
Pardon My Clutch	105	February 26, 1948	Wham Bam Slam	164	September 1, 1955	
Squareheads of the Round Table	106	March 4, 1948	Knutzy Knights	156	September 4, 1954	
Fiddlers Three	107	May 6, 1948	Musty Musketeers	154	May 13, 1954	
The Hot Scots	108	July 8, 1948	Scotched in Scotland	158	November 4, 1954	
The Hot Scots	108	July 8, 1948	Hot Ice	165	October 6, 1955	Scotland Yard sequence
Heavenly Daze	109	September 2, 1948	Bedlam in Paradise	162	April 14, 1955	
I'm a Monkey's Uncle	110	October 7, 1948	Stone Age Romeos	163	June 2, 1955	
Crime on Their Hands	112	December 9, 1948	Commotion on the Ocean	174	November 8, 1956	Newspaper room scene
Crime on Their Hands	112	December 9, 1948	Hot Ice	165	October 6, 1955	
The Ghost Talks	113	February 2, 1949	Creeps	168	February 2, 1956	
Who Done It?	114	March 3, 1949	For Crimin' Out Loud	170	May 3, 1956	
Hokus Pokus	115	May 5, 1949	Flagpole Jitters	169	April 5, 1956	
Fuelin' Around	116	July 7, 1949	Hot Stuff	172	September 6, 1956	"Fake Shemp"; filmed after Shemp's death
Malice in the Palace	117	September 1, 1949	Rumpus in the Harem	171	June 21, 1956	"Fake Shemp"; filmed after Shemp's death
Vagabond Loafers	118	October 6, 1949	Scheming Schemers	173	October 4, 1956	"Fake Shemp"; filmed after Shemp's death
Dunked in the Deep	119	November 3, 1949	Commotion on the Ocean	174	November 8, 1956	"Fake Shemp"; filmed after Shemp's death
Love at First Bite	123	May 4, 1950	Fifi Blows Her Top	184	April 10, 1958	
Corny Casanovas	139	May 1, 1952	Rusty Romeos	181	October 17, 1957	
He Cooked His Goose	140	July 3, 1952	Triple Crossed	189	February 2, 1959	
