= Loose Loot =

1953 U.S. short film by Jules White

- Directed by: Jules White
- Screenplay by: Jack White
- Story by: Felix Adler
- Produced by: Jules White
- Starring: Moe Howard; Larry Fine; Shemp Howard; Kenneth MacDonald; Tom Kennedy; Emil Sitka; Nanette Bordeaux; Suzanne Ridgeway
- Edited by: Edwin H. Bryant
- Distributed by: Columbia Pictures
- Release date: April 2, 1953 (U.S.)
- Running time: 15:54
- Country: United States
- Language: English

Loose Loot is a 1953 short subject directed by Jules White starring American slapstick comedy team The Three Stooges (Moe Howard, Larry Fine and Shemp Howard). It is the 146th entry in the series released by Columbia Pictures starring the comedians, who released 190 shorts for the studio between 1934 and 1959.

== Plot ==
The Stooges are the sole beneficiaries of a substantial inheritance, yet encounter obstacles in the form of a duplicitous broker named Icabod Slipp, who has taken control of the funds. Engaging in a series of confrontations with Slipp in his office, the Stooges are subjected to false accusations of being the culprits responsible for the misappropriation of funds. Consequently, Slipp absconds with the inheritance, prompting the Stooges to pursue him to a theater.

Within the confines of the theater, a tumultuous exchange ensues between the Stooges and Slipp, along with his associate Joe, as they vie for control of the money. Amidst a flurry of physical altercations and exchanges of the inheritance bag, the Stooges emerge victorious over Slipp and Joe. However, their victory is short-lived as they encounter unexpected resistance from three showgirls who had concealed themselves in a nearby closet during the confrontation. Unbeknownst to the Stooges, these showgirls had become aware of the money and engage in a comical struggle to retain possession of it.

Further complicating matters, a surreal turn of events unfolds when a portrait of Napoleon inexplicably springs to life, seizing the bag of money and attempting to abscond with it. Reacting swiftly, Moe incapacitates the animated Napoleon with a well-aimed brick, allowing the Stooges to reclaim the money. Their triumph culminates in a celebratory dance as they reclaim their rightful inheritance.

== Cast ==
=== Credited ===
- Moe Howard as Moe
- Larry Fine as Larry
- Shemp Howard as Shemp
- Kenneth MacDonald as Icabod Slipp
- Tom Kennedy as Joe

=== Uncredited ===
- Emil Sitka as Attorney (stock footage)
- Nanette Bordeaux as French showgirl
- Suzanne Ridgeway as Suzie, showgirl
- Johnny Kascier as Napoleon
- Beverly Thomas as Showgirl

== Production notes ==
The first half of Loose Loot consists of footage recycled from Hold That Lion!.

Johnny Kascier’s playing of Napoleon in the painting was similar to I'll Never Heil Again with Curly Howard. The Three Stooges are fighting over a turkey, they throw it and Napoleon steals the turkey and runs away. Icabod Slipp's name appears on the door as "I. Slipp." This is a semantic parody on the Long Island town of Islip, New York.
