= Pardon My Backfire =

1953 film by Jules White

- Directed by: Jules White
- Written by: Felix Adler
- Produced by: Jules White
- Starring: Moe Howard; Larry Fine; Shemp Howard; Benny Rubin; Frank Sully; Phil Arnold; Fred Kelsey; Barbara Bartay; Diana Darrin; Angela Stevens; Ruth Godfrey
- Cinematography: Henry Freulich
- Edited by: Edwin H. Bryant
- Distributed by: Columbia Pictures
- Release date: August 15, 1953 (U.S.)
- Running time: 15:52
- Country: United States
- Language: English

Pardon My Backfire is a 1953 short subject directed by Jules White starring American slapstick comedy team The Three Stooges (Moe Howard, Larry Fine and Shemp Howard). It is the 149th entry in the series released by Columbia Pictures starring the comedians, who released 190 shorts for the studio between 1934 and 1959.

== Plot ==
The Stooges are auto mechanics who need money in order to marry their sweethearts. While working in their auto garage, some escaped convicts pull in with a damaged fender. While the trio are working on the vehicle, they hear a news flash over the radio about some escaped convicts. They put the pieces together and realize that the baddies are right in their garage. The boys capture the crooks, collect the reward, and marry their sweethearts.

3-D effects include Moe's eye pokes,Shemp saying "I want a piece of cake in t he worst way"(and gets it)---and such dangerous tools as blowtorches and hammers coming "at you". When Moe's rear end is set afire Shemp tries to put it out with paint thinner(with predictable results).

== Cast ==
=== Credited ===
- Moe Howard as Moe
- Larry Fine as Larry
- Shemp Howard as Shemp
- Benny Rubin as Charles
- Frank Sully as Algernon
- Phil Arnold as Shiv

=== Uncredited ===
- Fred Kelsey as Father
- Barbara Bartay as Gun moll
- Diana Darrin as Bettie
- Angela Stevens as Hettie
- Ruth Godfrey as Nettie
- Blackie Whiteford as first Policeman
- Harold Breen as second Policeman
- Jules White as Radio announcer

== Production notes ==
Pardon My Backfire was the second and last short made by Columbia with the Stooges in 3D, the previous being Spooks! (released June 15). Pardon My Backfire premiered on August 15, 1953 with the 3D Columbia western The Stranger Wore a Gun starring Randolph Scott and featuring Lee Marvin and Ernest Borgnine.

Like its predecessor, Pardon My Backfire took five full days to complete filming due to the complexity of capturing shots and angles required for 3D viewing. New Stooge films produced at the time generally took no more than three days to complete, with remakes being completed in a single day.

This is the third and final Stooge short with the words "pardon my" in the title. This was also the last Stooge short featuring longtime supporting actor Fred Kelsey.
