= Blunder Boys =

1955 American short film by Jules White

- Directed by: Jules White
- Written by: Felix Adler
- Produced by: Jules White
- Starring: Moe Howard; Larry Fine; Shemp Howard; Kenneth MacDonald; Benny Rubin; Frank Sully; Barbara Bartay; Angela Stevens
- Cinematography: Ray Cory
- Edited by: Anthony DiMarco
- Distributed by: Columbia Pictures
- Release date: November 3, 1955 (U.S.)
- Running time: 15:57
- Country: United States
- Language: English

Blunder Boys is a 1955 short subject directed by Jules White starring American slapstick comedy team The Three Stooges (Moe Howard, Larry Fine and Shemp Howard). It is the 166th entry in the series released by Columbia Pictures starring the comedians, who released 190 shorts for the studio between 1934 and 1959.

== Plot ==
Following their military service, the Stooges opt to pursue tertiary education, specializing in the field of criminology. Despite completing their studies with the attainment of the lowest academic honors, the trio subsequently integrate into law enforcement ranks, entrusted with the task of apprehending a notorious bandit known as the Eel, poised to perpetrate a robbery at the esteemed Biltless Hotel.

Their endeavors, however, prove futile, as they fail to apprehend the criminal or recover the pilfered funds, resulting in their expulsion from the police force. Subsequently relegated to menial labor as ditch diggers, the Stooges find themselves grappling with the ramifications of their failed law enforcement venture.

== Cast ==
=== Credited ===
- Moe Howard as Halliday
- Larry Fine as Terriday
- Shemp Howard as Days (Saint Patrick's Day/Groundhog Day/New Year's Day/Christmas Day/Independence Day/Labor Day)
- Benny Rubin as The Eel
- Angela Stevens as Alma Matter
- Kenneth MacDonald as F. B. Eye

=== Uncredited ===
- Frank Sully as Watts D. Matter
- Al Thompson as Desk clerk
- Barbara Bartay as Beautician
- Johnny Kascier as Room service waiter/Moe and Shemp's stand-in
- Bonnie Henjum as Woman in swimsuit
- Barbara Donaldson as Turkish bath tanner
- Marjorie Jackson as Turkish bath brunette
- June Lebow as Turkish bath blonde

== Production notes ==
Blunder Boys was the last Stooge film featuring Shemp Howard that was not a remake. In addition, it would also be the last film released during his lifetime; Shemp died of a heart attack 19 days later after its release. Filming was completed on January 24–26, 1955.

The premise of Blunder Boys is a parody of the television series Dragnet. The ending was also a parody of the company that ran Dragnet, (Mark VII Limited); Moe stamps the logo, "VII 1/2 The End", on Larry's head in a similar fashion to how it is done in the logo.

Of his 16 appearances with the Stooges, Blunder Boys marks the only time Kenneth MacDonald was not cast as the team's antagonist.

Blunder Boys was the last Stooges film to feature new footage of long-time supporting actor Al Thompson.

== See also ==
- List of American films of 1955
