= Hot Ice (1955 film) =

- Directed by: Jules White; Edward Bernds (stock footage)
- Screenplay by: Jack White
- Story by: Elwood Ullman
- Produced by: Jules White
- Starring: Moe Howard; Larry Fine; Shemp Howard; Kenneth MacDonald; Christine McIntyre; Cy Schindell; Barbara Bartay; George Lloyd
- Cinematography: Fred Jackman Jr.
- Edited by: Anthony DiMarco
- Distributed by: Columbia Pictures
- Release date: October 6, 1955 (U.S.)
- Running time: 16:11
- Country: United States
- Language: English

Hot Ice is a 1955 short subject directed by Jules White starring American slapstick comedy team The Three Stooges (Moe Howard, Larry Fine and Shemp Howard). It is the 165th entry in the series released by Columbia Pictures starring the comedians, who released 190 shorts for the studio between 1934 and 1959.

== Plot ==
The Stooges are aspiring detectives who find themselves inadvertently immersed in a case concerning the theft of the esteemed Punjab diamond by the notorious Dapper, prompting a departure for Scotland to investigate. Driven by aspirations of professional validation, the trio embarks on a quest for intelligence at Squid McGuffy's cafe, masquerading as law enforcement officials to elicit cooperation.

Their investigative endeavors yield a fortuitous discovery within the premises, as they chance upon Dapper's accomplice concealing the purloined jewel within a candy receptacle. Despite initial misconceptions and comedic missteps, the Stooges maintain their vigilance, anticipating Dapper's eventual appearance.

During their stakeout, a sequence of events unfolds precipitating a comedic imbroglio, with Shemp inadvertently ingesting the diamond amid flirtatious overtures towards Dapper's moll. The ensuing escalation of tensions culminates in a perilous predicament, with Dapper resorting to drastic measures to retrieve the diamond.

However, a fortuitous turn of events intervenes, as Moe and Larry, incarcerated in a closet, acquire tools enabling their escape, inadvertently stumbling into a confrontation with a gorilla that incapacitates Dapper and his cohort. Subsequent events lead to the unexpected retrieval of the diamond from Shemp's person, facilitated by the unlikely intervention of the gorilla. Shortly thereafter, Shemp elucidates the manner in which he successfully ingested the diamond, attributing his achievement to the replication of the same action.

== Cast ==
=== Credited ===
- Moe Howard as Moe
- Larry Fine as Larry
- Shemp Howard as Shemp
- Kenneth MacDonald as Dapper Malone
- Christine McIntyre as Bea (stock footage)
- Barbara Bartay as Girl in Bar

=== Uncredited ===
- Lester Allen as Runty (stock footage)
- Cy Schindell as Muscles (stock footage)
  - Joe Palma as Muscles (new footage)
- Ray "Crash" Corrigan as Harold the gorilla (stock footage)
- George Lloyd as Squid McGuffey
- Clive Morgan as Inspector McCormick (stock footage)
- James Logan as Constable Dawson (stock footage)
- Jimmy Aubrey as Hawkins
- Heinie Conklin as Bartender
- Harry Wilson as Bum in bed
- Blackie Whiteford as Seaman (stock footage)

== Production notes ==
Hot Ice is a remake of 1948's Crime on Their Hands, using ample recycled footage. In addition, the Scotland Yard scenes were recycled from 1948's The Hot Scots. New scenes were filmed on January 17, 1955.

Joe Palma doubles for Cy Schindell, who died in 1948, in new footage.

== Critical reception ==
In his review, DVD Talk critic Stuart Galbraith IV noted how poorly new footage (below) was matched with old (above), pinpointing that the Stooges' wardrobes do not match.

DVD Talk critic Stuart Galbraith IV deemed Hot Ice "another pointless reworking of material done better the first time around," saying that "the few scraps of new footage...have no particular reason to exist, and are inserted throughout via extremely awkward edits. Take a gander at the sloppy cut between the Three Stooges and the Three Significantly Older Stooges at 10:14; even their clothes don't match." Galbraith also called out director Jules White's penchant for recycling footage, stating that White was "apparently a man with no scruples but a lot of chutzpah: though Edward Bernds directed both earlier shorts, which account for about 90 percent of Hot Ice's running time, White listed only himself as its director."

== See also ==
- List of American films of 1955
