= Rhythm and Weep =

1946 film by Jules White

- Columbia Pictures tagged Moe and Larry's names incorrectly on this one-sheet for Rhythm and Weep.
- Directed by: Jules White
- Written by: Felix Adler
- Produced by: Jules White
- Starring: Moe Howard; Larry Fine; Curly Howard; Nita Bieber; Ruth Godfrey; Jack Norton; Gloria Patrice; Robert Kellard
- Cinematography: Philip Tannura
- Edited by: Edwin H. Bryant
- Distributed by: Columbia Pictures
- Release date: October 3, 1946 (U.S.)
- Running time: 17:50
- Country: United States
- Language: English

Rhythm and Weep is a 1946 short subject directed by Jules White starring American slapstick comedy team The Three Stooges (Moe Howard, Larry Fine and Curly Howard). It is the 95th entry in the series released by Columbia Pictures starring the comedians, who released 190 shorts for the studio between 1934 and 1959.

== Plot ==
The Stooges are aspiring but disillusioned actors on the brink of despair, contemplating ending their lives by leaping from a skyscraper. Their morbid intentions are interrupted when they encounter three young women similarly inclined towards self-destruction due to their failed endeavors in the realm of dance. Instantly smitten, the Stooges develop romantic affections for the distressed women.

However, their shared plight takes an unexpected turn when the sound of piano music wafts through the air, diverting their attention from their grim intentions. Following the melodic trail, they descend to a lower floor where they encounter a wealthy individual engaged in piano performance. This affluent benefactor, intrigued by their talents, offers them a lucrative opportunity to showcase their skills, promising substantial remuneration if they prove to be proficient.

Their performance captivates the millionaire, who not only fulfills his promise of generous compensation but also magnanimously doubles their salaries. Unfortunately, their newfound benefactor's eccentricity becomes apparent when he jests about his lavish spending habits, only to be promptly escorted back to an asylum by attendants.

== Production notes ==
The title parodies the card-game expression "Read 'Em and Weep." Ruth Godfrey was director Jules White's daughter-in-law.

This short contained one of the few instances that the Stooges broke the "fourth wall". During his time on the ledge, Larry hugs his girl, looks into the camera, and says to the audience: "This I like! And I get paid for it, too!"

=== Curly's illness ===
Rhythm and Weep was filmed on April 23–26, 1946, the penultimate entry produced featuring Curly Howard as a member of the Stooges as it was filmed after the next released entry, Three Little Pirates.

The 42-year-old comedian had suffered a series of minor strokes over the previous 16 months prior to filming, and his performances had been unpredictable. By the time of Rhythm and Weep, he had lost a considerable amount of weight, and lines had creased his face.

While director Edward Bernds devised ways to cover his illness, Jules White simply gave most of Curly's lines to Larry. In fact, Curly was so ill during production that he could no longer remember what few lines he had. Moe's son-in-law Norman Maurer was present during filming, and recalled Curly was hurting. "He was having trouble with his coordination," recalled Maurer. "He was supposed to pop pills in his mouth during the (doctor's office) scene, but the scene was switched to Moe putting the pills into Curly's mouth because of Curly's physical problems."
