= Self-Made Maids =

1950 film by Jules White

- Directed by: Jules White
- Written by: Felix Adler
- Produced by: Jules White
- Starring: Moe Howard; Larry Fine; Shemp Howard
- Cinematography: Vincent J. Farrar
- Edited by: Edwin H. Bryant
- Distributed by: Columbia Pictures
- Release date: July 6, 1950 (U.S.)
- Running time: 15:47
- Country: United States
- Language: English

Self-Made Maids is a 1950 short subject directed by Jules White starring American slapstick comedy team The Three Stooges (Moe Howard, Larry Fine and Shemp Howard). It is the 124th entry in the series released by Columbia Pictures starring the comedians, who released 190 shorts for the studio between 1934 and 1959.

== Plot ==
The Stooges are artists who develop romantic attachments to three models: Larraine, Moella, and Shempetta. The narrative commences with the models preparing for their portrait session, hastily departing the studio to avoid tardiness. However, their haste leads to comical mishaps as Larraine and Shempetta collide with a wall, while Moella inadvertently stumbles into an adjacent room.

Upon the arrival of the models at the studio, the Stooges inadvertently ruin each other's artistic endeavors. Their anxiety dissipates upon the models' arrival. Subsequently, the Stooges propose marriage to the models, prompting a visit to their father to seek his approval.

Inadvertently crossing paths with the models' father without recognizing his identity, the Stooges incur his wrath, leading to a confrontation. Despite their initial altercation, the Stooges retaliate in their characteristic manner, prompting the models' father to reject their marriage proposals upon realizing their prior transgressions.

A chaotic pursuit ensues within the confines of the house, culminating in the Stooges apprehending the models' father and employing tickling as a means of persuasion. Ultimately, the models' father relents and consents to the marriages, leading to the union of the three couples. In a subsequent development, each couple is blessed with the arrival of a newborn child, completing their familial aspirations.

== Cast ==
- Moe Howard as Moe, Moella, Father, Murgatroyd
- Larry Fine as Larry, Larraine, Baby Doll and Lady in art
- Shemp Howard as Shemp, Shempetta, Junior and Mustache man in art
- Teddy Mangean as Man in Lobby (uncredited)

== Production notes ==
Self-Made Maids was filmed on March 14–17, 1949. It is one of two Stooge films that does not have a supporting cast, the other being 1958's Oil's Well That Ends Well. The boys all play themselves, a second character in drag, and their children. Moe also plays the girls' father, while Shemp and Larry appear briefly as a couple in a painting.

During the initial scene, Moe sustained a sprained ankle when his right high-heeled foot twisted at the ankle while engaged in skipping. To mitigate disruption to the filming process, Moe exited the camera frame by hopping into an adjacent room. In the process of attempting to break his fall onto a bed, he inadvertently tripped and collided with the bed's leg, resulting in a loss of consciousness. Moe subsequently reported to the set the following day, necessitating the use of crutches due to the ankle injury incurred during the previous day's filming.
