= Slaphappy Sleuths =

1950 film by Jules White

- Directed by: Jules White
- Written by: Felix Adler
- Produced by: Jules White
- Starring: Moe Howard; Larry Fine; Shemp Howard; Stanley Blystone; Gene Roth; Emil Sitka; Nanette Bordeaux; Vernon Dent; Joe Palma; Blackie Whiteford
- Cinematography: Vincent J. Farrar
- Edited by: Edwin H. Bryant
- Distributed by: Columbia Pictures
- Release date: November 9, 1950 (U.S.)
- Running time: 16:09
- Country: United States
- Language: English

Slaphappy Sleuths is a 1950 short subject directed by Jules White starring American slapstick comedy team The Three Stooges (Moe Howard, Larry Fine and Shemp Howard). It is the 127th entry in the series released by Columbia Pictures starring the comedians, who appeared in 190 shorts for the studio between 1934 and 1959.

== Plot ==
The Stooges serve as investigators representing the Onion Oil company, tasked with resolving a series of robberies plaguing the company's service stations. Despite their diligent efforts to provide exemplary customer service, offering unconventional amenities such as shaves, manicures, cologne, and popcorn, the Stooges fall victim to theft while momentarily distracted. Following a trail of motor oil, they ultimately locate the hideout of the perpetrators, where they display unexpectedly proficient boxing prowess, surpassing their earlier detective endeavors.

== Cast ==
=== Credited ===
- Moe Howard as Moe
- Larry Fine as Larry
- Shemp Howard as Shemp
- Stanley Blystone as Ed, the gang leader
- Gene Roth as Fuller Grime
- Emil Sitka as Customer

=== Uncredited ===
- Nanette Bordeaux as Louise
- Vernon Dent as unknown (cut role)
- Joe Palma as Spike, a gang member
- Blackie Whiteford as Butch, a gang member

== Production notes ==
Slaphappy Sleuths was filmed on April 11–14, 1949 and released 19 months later in November 1950.

The gag of a third Stooge acting like a bloodhound and tries to sniff out the tracks of enemies was also used in Goofs and Saddles (1937) and Phony Express (1943). The gas pumps have female gas names: Ethel, Hazel, and Becky.
