= A Merry Mix Up =

1957 film by Jules White

A Merry Mix-Up
- Columbia Pictures made an error by listing the Stooges as "Shemp (who had died in November 1955), Larry and Joe," omitting Moe entirely
- Directed by: Jules White
- Written by: Felix Adler
- Produced by: Jules White
- Starring: Moe Howard; Larry Fine; Joe Besser; Nanette Bordeaux; Jeanne Carmen; Ruth Godfrey White; Suzanne Ridgeway; Harriette Tarler; Diana Darrin; Frank Sully
- Cinematography: Irving Lippman
- Edited by: Harold White
- Distributed by: Columbia Pictures
- Release date: March 28, 1957 (U.S.)
- Running time: 15:51
- Country: United States
- Language: English

A Merry Mix-Up is a 1957 short subject directed by Jules White starring American slapstick comedy team The Three Stooges (Moe Howard, Larry Fine and Joe Besser). It is the 177th entry in the series released by Columbia Pictures starring the comedians, who appeared in 190 shorts for the studio between 1934 and 1959.

== Plot ==
The Stooges play three sets of identical triplets, each born with a one-year interval between them. Following World War II, these nine brothers lose contact with one another, unaware of their shared proximity within the same city. Distinguishing characteristics set them apart: one set (comprising Moe, Larry, and Joe) remains single, another (Max, Louie, and Jack) is wedded, while the third (Morris, Luke, and Jeff) is engaged. Their attire, specifically their neckwear — striped ties for the single brothers, no ties for the married trio, and bow ties for the engaged siblings — serves as a visual identifier.

The narrative escalates when the engaged brothers opt to revel at a local nightclub. Prior to their arrival, the unmarried set makes an entrance, trailed by their brothers' betrothed partners. Mistaken identities ensue as the ladies mistakenly embrace and bestow affections upon the unsuspecting brothers. Subsequently, the wives of the married trio appear, suspecting infidelity on their husbands' part upon witnessing the scene. Convinced that their intended spouses are already wedded, the engaged brothers receive their engagement rings back from the girls, who then depart. As the engaged siblings enter the scene, they are met with reprimand from their fiancees.

A series of misunderstandings ensue as the wives return to confront their husbands, who have been occupied in the kitchen. Amidst confusion, the group decides to revisit the nightclub in an attempt to debunk the allegations. However, the waiter, who remains unconscious throughout the chaos, mistakenly believes their presence and confronts them upon awakening. Amidst the ensuing chase, the engaged and single brothers enter the scene separately, further complicating the situation. Ultimately, the waiter encounters all nine brothers simultaneously, prompting a reaction as he purposely strikes himself with a cleaver.

== Cast ==
=== Credited ===
- Moe Howard as Moe, Max and Morris
- Larry Fine as Larry, Louie and Luke
- Joe Besser as Joe, Jack and Jeff

=== Uncredited ===
- Frank Sully as Waiter and Narrator
- Nanette Bordeaux as May
- Jeanne Carmen as Mary
- Ruth Godfrey White as Leona
- Suzanne Ridgeway as Jill
- Harriette Tarler as Letty
- Diana Darrin as Jane

== Production notes ==
A Merry Mix-Up was filmed on May 14–16, 1956; it is a remake of Laurel and Hardy's Our Relations (1936). Felix Adler provided the screenplay for both films.

The closing matte shot featuring all nine brothers standing side by side took careful planning to expose perfectly, giving the effect of three Moes, Larrys and Joes. To achieve this, each Stooge had to stand behind a specific marker before each shot was taken. For the final exposure, director Jules White suspected that Larry Fine was standing behind the wrong marker when compared to the previous two exposures. Larry knew White was wrong, and went to great lengths to prove it. Luckily, Larry prevailed, and saved the studio from having to refilm thousands of dollars' worth of exposures.
