= Tricky Dicks =

1953 American short film by Jules White

- Directed by: Jules White
- Written by: Felix Adler
- Produced by: Jules White
- Starring: Moe Howard; Larry Fine; Shemp Howard; Benny Rubin; Connie Cezan; Ferris Taylor; Phil Arnold; Murray Alper; Suzanne Ridgeway
- Cinematography: William P. Whitley
- Edited by: Edwin H. Bryant
- Distributed by: Columbia Pictures
- Release date: May 7, 1953 (U.S.)
- Running time: 15:50
- Country: United States
- Language: English

Tricky Dicks is a 1953 short subject directed by Jules White starring American slapstick comedy team The Three Stooges (Moe Howard, Larry Fine and Shemp Howard). It is the 147th entry in the series released by Columbia Pictures starring the comedians, who released 190 shorts for the studio between 1934 and 1959.

== Plot ==
The Stooges, assuming the roles of detectives immersed in a game of gin rummy, contend with constant interruptions, particularly from a persistently ringing telephone. Their focus is momentarily diverted when Shemp introduces the pickpocket Slick Chick, who adeptly eludes the confines of the police station through persuasive rhetoric. Subsequently, Shemp joins the ongoing gin rummy match, adding another layer of complexity to their activities as they grapple with the challenges posed by an obstinate filing cabinet.

Their routine is disrupted by the imposition of a time-sensitive task by their angry superior, Police Chief B. A. Copper, who tasks them with resolving the murder case of Slug McGurk within a 24-hour timeframe. The trio's initial encounter with a prospective suspect named Chopper is marked by linguistic convolution, as his verbose confession bewilders the Stooges, leading to their dismissal of his assertions. Amidst the chaos, Larry's amorous advance towards a female officer is met with a swift rebuke.

Further complicating matters, their office becomes a revolving door for individuals seeking their attention, culminating in a succession of encounters with a witness whose incongruous appearance and linguistic incongruity provoke bewilderment. The comedic trajectory unfolds with Shemp's comical exchange regarding a dismissed bootlegging charge and culminates in a chaotic confrontation with an armed assailant within the confines of their office.

The ensuing pandemonium is mitigated by the intervention of Antonio Zucchini Salami Gorgonzola de Pizza's resourceful monkey, which incapacitates the assailant with a series of well-aimed objects, allowing the Stooges to emerge bewildered but unscathed.

== Cast ==
- Moe Howard as Moe
- Larry Fine as Larry
- Shemp Howard as Shemp
- Ferris Taylor as B. A. Copper
- Benny Rubin as Antonio Zucchini Salami Gorgonzola de Pizza
- Connie Cezan as Slick Chick
- Phil Arnold as Chopper
- Murray Alper as Mr. Pardon
- Suzanne Ridgeway as Policewoman (uncredited)

== Production notes ==
Tricky Dicks was filmed in July 1952 and is a spoof of the 1951 film Detective Story.

The filing cabinet footage is recycled from Hold That Lion!
