= Pest Man Wins =

1951 film by Jules White

- Directed by: Jules White
- Written by: Felix Adler
- Produced by: Jules White
- Starring: Moe Howard; Larry Fine; Shemp Howard; Margie Liszt; Nanette Bordeaux; Emil Sitka; Vernon Dent
- Cinematography: Fayte Brown
- Edited by: Edwin Bryant
- Distributed by: Columbia Pictures
- Release date: December 6, 1951 (U.S.)
- Running time: 16:01
- Country: United States
- Language: English

Pest Man Wins is a 1951 short subject directed by Jules White starring American slapstick comedy team The Three Stooges (Moe Howard, Larry Fine and Shemp Howard). It is the 136th entry in the series released by Columbia Pictures starring the comedians, who released 190 shorts for the studio between 1934 and 1959.

== Plot ==
The Stooges are marginally employed pest exterminators who devise a scheme to develop their business by surreptitiously introducing mice, moths, and ants into an affluent household hosting a dinner party. Their objective is to subsequently offer their services to remediate the pest infestation they themselves created, thereby capitalizing on the situation.

The party's hostess instructs her butler to dress the exterminators in formal attire so they may work discreetly. The three make their entrance into the elegant soirée carrying a sack filled with cats, which the scandalized hostess urges them to conceal immediately. The trio's ill-advised decision to hide the sack inside an upright piano results in chaos moments later, when the esteemed guest pianist, Mr. Philander, takes a seat at the piano to play Johann Strauss II's "Blue Danube Waltz". The recital is quickly disrupted by a cacophony of feline voices, instigated by a mouse's intrusion into the piano. In their attempt to rectify the situation, the Stooges inadvertently exacerbate it.

Following this debacle, a dispute among the Stooges at the pastry table initiates a pie fight, which escalates until all guests are covered with pie. The hostess ends the fracas by knocking the trio unconscious with a club.

== Production notes ==
Pest Man Wins was filmed on February 12–15, 1951. It is a remake of Ants in the Pantry (1936) using minimal stock footage. In addition, a pie fight scene is recycled footage from In the Sweet Pie and Pie (1941) and Half-Wits Holiday (1947).

The title is a parody of the expression "the best man wins."
