= Income Tax Sappy =

1954 American short film by Jules White

- Directed by: Jules White
- Written by: Felix Adler
- Produced by: Jules White
- Starring: Moe Howard; Larry Fine; Shemp Howard; Benny Rubin; Margie Liszt; Nanette Bordeaux; Vernon Dent; Joe Palma
- Cinematography: Ray Cory
- Edited by: Edwin Bryant
- Distributed by: Columbia Pictures
- Release date: February 4, 1954 (U.S.)
- Running time: 16:31
- Country: United States
- Language: English

Income Tax Sappy is a 1954 short subject directed by Jules White starring the American slapstick comedy team The Three Stooges (Moe Howard, Larry Fine and Shemp Howard). It is the 153rd entry in the series released by Columbia Pictures starring the comedians, who released 190 shorts for the studio between 1934 and 1959.

== Plot ==
The Stooges are faced with the imminent deadline for filing their income taxes. During their preparations, Moe remarks on the potential ease of deceit in tax returns without detection. This prompts the three to devise a scheme involving falsifying deductions to secure a substantial refund. Expanding on this plan, Larry and Shemp propose offering fraudulent deductions services to others for a fee, thus positioning themselves as "tax experts".

Their scheme proves lucrative, leading to a period of opulence for the trio, who amass considerable wealth from their deceitful endeavors. However, their prosperity is short-lived. During a dinner event with a client, Mr. Cash, whose distinctive beard inadvertently falls victim to Larry's clumsy hand, tensions escalate due to a series of mishaps and the Stooges' ineptitude. Mr. Cash, revealing himself as an undercover agent for the Internal Revenue Service, promptly calls for backup to arrest the Stooges for tax fraud.

== Cast ==
=== Credited ===
- Moe Howard as Moe
- Larry Fine as Larry
- Shemp Howard as Shemp
- Margie Liszt as Sis
- Benny Rubin as Mr. Cash
- Nanette Bordeaux as Mrs. Cash

=== Uncredited ===
- Frances Curry as Frances
- Vernon Dent as IRS Agent
- Joe Palma as IRS Agent

== Production notes ==
The title Income Tax Sappy is a homonym for "Income Tax Happy."

This is one of only two shorts released in 1954 containing all new footage, the other being Shot in the Frontier. Shemp Howard did not slick down his long hair in either film. This was because he had begun dying his hair by this time, and initially could not use pomade.

Income Tax Sappy features a recurring gag of "Man Vs. Soup," wherein one of the Stooges is about to eat a soup that, at first unbeknownst to them, contains a live crustacean that continually eats all the crackers the Stooge drops in it, and a battle between the two parties ensues. In 1941's Dutiful But Dumb, Former Stooge Curly Howard tries to defeat a stubborn oyster in his stew; in 1948's Shivering Sherlocks, Moe is having problems with clam chowder; in this episode, Larry struggles against lobster gumbo.
