= Pals and Gals =

1954 film by Jules White

- Directed by: Jules White; Edward Bernds (stock footage)
- Screenplay by: Jack White
- Story by: Clyde Bruckman
- Produced by: Jules White
- Starring: Moe Howard; Larry Fine; Shemp Howard; Christine McIntyre; Norma Randall; Ruth White; Stanley Blystone; Norman Willes; Joe Palma; George Chesebro; Heinie Conklin; Vernon Dent; Frank Ellis; Blackie Whiteford
- Cinematography: Gert Anderson
- Edited by: Edwin Bryant
- Distributed by: Columbia Pictures
- Release date: June 3, 1954 (U.S.)
- Running time: 16:41
- Country: United States
- Language: English

Pals and Gals is a 1954 short subject directed by Jules White starring American slapstick comedy team The Three Stooges (Moe Howard, Larry Fine and Shemp Howard). It is the 155th entry in the series released by Columbia Pictures starring the comedians, who released 190 shorts for the studio between 1934 and 1959.

== Plot ==
Shemp's ailment, an enlarged vein in his leg, triggers concerns about potential amputation. Following medical advice, he embarks on a therapeutic journey to the Old West. Arriving in a frontier town characterized by its lawlessness, the trio forms an unlikely bond with the notorious outlaw Doc Barker. Misinterpreting Shemp's reference to his medical condition as a metaphor for a lucrative gold vein, Barker becomes intrigued. However, their newfound camaraderie is tested when Nell, a local resident, reveals Barker's true identity as an outlaw holding her sisters captive.

The Stooges devise a stratagem to acquire the keys to the prison cell where Nell's sisters are held. Shemp engages Barker in a poker game, while Moe and Larry concoct a potent beverage containing various hazardous substances, aiming to incapacitate the outlaws. To safeguard Shemp, they provide him with a harmless sarsaparilla. After Barker unwittingly consumes the toxic concoction and demands water, Shemp douses the gang with a fire hose, enabling Moe and Larry to retrieve the keys and free Nell's sisters.

Barker succumbs to heart failure during the poker game, and his gang plans to execute Larry. Moe and Shemp, aided by makeshift tools, endeavor to rescue their comrade while the sisters seek outside assistance. Evading capture, the Stooges resort to disguising themselves in Southern-style attire but are recognized by a gang member. A frantic chase ensues, leading the trio to seek refuge outside town. When cornered by Barker's gang, Shemp ingeniously repurposes his gun belt as makeshift ammunition, intimidating the assailants into retreat and ensuring the Stooges' triumph.

== Cast ==
=== Credited ===
- Moe Howard as Moe
- Larry Fine as Larry
- Shemp Howard as Shemp
- Christine McIntyre as Nell
- George Chesebro as Quirt
- Norman Willes as Doc Barker (stock footage)

=== Uncredited ===
- Norma Randall as Zell
- Ruth White as Belle
- Stanley Blystone as Pete
- Joe Palma as unnamed henchman
- Heinie Conklin as Bartender (stock footage)
- Vernon Dent as Doctor (stock footage)
- Frank Ellis as Jake
- Blackie Whiteford as Pinto (final film)

== Production notes ==
Pals and Gals is a reworking of Out West (1947), utilizing a substantial amount of stock footage. Notably, scenes featuring the Stooges' egress from the saloon on horseback derive from Goofs and Saddles (1937). To seamlessly integrate disparate footage, insert shots necessary for continuity were filmed on April 28, 1953.

In an effort to imbue the recycled footage with a semblance of narrative cohesion, the character of Doc Barker meets his demise due to heart failure induced by imbibing Moe's Mickey Finn. However, due to oversight in the editing process, Barker inadvertently reappears during a subsequent sequence featuring Nell's performance at the bar. To mitigate this inconsistency and align pre-chase sequences with those from Goofs and Saddles, Stanley Blystone, who appeared as antagonist Longhorn Pete in the latter film, assumed the role of one of the gang members in Pals and Gals. This strategic casting decision aimed to minimize the conspicuous disparity arising from Blystone's appearance in the recycled footage, particularly during the Stooges' escape scene. In Out West, Blystone's role was that of a United States Cavalry Colonel, serving as a pivotal plot element. However, this narrative motif was not retained in Pals and Gals.

Director Jules White, renowned for his attention to detail, leveraged his background as a film editor to ensure seamless continuity between new and existing footage. Utilizing a moviola on set, White meticulously scrutinized each frame to ensure narrative consistency and visual coherence, thereby preserving the integrity of the cinematic narrative.
