= Oil's Well That Ends Well =

1958 film by Jules White

- Directed by: Jules White
- Written by: Felix Adler
- Produced by: Jules White
- Starring: Moe Howard; Larry Fine; Joe Besser
- Cinematography: Irving Lippman
- Edited by: Edwin H. Bryant
- Distributed by: Columbia Pictures
- Release date: December 4, 1958 (U.S.)
- Running time: 16:13
- Country: United States
- Language: English

Oil's Well That Ends Well is a 1958 short subject directed by Jules White starring American slapstick comedy team The Three Stooges (Moe Howard, Larry Fine and Joe Besser). It is the 188th entry in the series released by Columbia Pictures starring the comedians, who released 190 shorts for the studio between 1934 and 1959.

== Plot ==
The Stooges find themselves unemployed and faced with familial responsibility as their father requires surgery, prompting a need for financial support. In response, the father proposes a venture to search for uranium deposits on his mining property as a means to alleviate the financial strain. While exploring the property, the Stooges encounter perilous situations, including a precarious encounter with dynamite, complicating their efforts.

Further complications arise when the trio attempts to repair a malfunctioning water pump, triggering an unexpected eruption of oil. In an attempt to stem the flow, Joe improvises by seating himself atop the pump, inadvertently launching himself into the air upon its sudden cessation. Joe's inadvertent wish for the flow to cease is unexpectedly fulfilled, much to the chagrin of his companions, Moe and Larry.

Nevertheless, Joe manages to restore the flow of oil, leading to a fortuitous turn of events for the Stooges, who find themselves in possession of a lucrative oil source, thus resolving their financial concerns and providing the means to support their father's medical expenses.

== Production notes ==
Though technically a reworking of Oily to Bed, Oily to Rise, none of the original plot is featured in this short. In addition, the only recycled footage utilized in Oil's Well That Ends Well is the shot of Curly Howard riding the oil gusher up into the sky. In addition, the concept of Joe wishing for things that come true was borrowed from Oily to Bed, Oily to Rise. The film was shot over two days on August 26–27, 1957. It is also one of two Stooge films that does not have a supporting cast, the other being 1950's Self-Made Maids.

Oil's Well That Ends Well contains a rare instance where the Stooges break the fourth wall, and directly address the camera audience. Joe, after being chastised by Moe and told to sit down, turns around to the camera and mouths "I hate him!" to the audience before walking off-screen.

The title Oil's Well That Ends Well is a pun of "all's well that ends well."

== See also ==
- List of American films of 1958
