= My Maryland =

- Sheet music cover (cropped)
- Music: Sigmund Romberg
- Lyrics: Dorothy Donnelly
- Book: Dorothy Donnelly
- Basis: 1899 play Barbara Frietchie by Clyde Fitch
- Productions: 1927 Broadway

My Maryland is a "musical romance" with book and lyrics by Dorothy Donnelly and music by Sigmund Romberg, based on the play Barbara Frietchie by Clyde Fitch. The musical takes place in the towns of Frederick, Maryland and Hagerstown, Maryland.

== Production ==
My Maryland was staged by J. C. Huffman. Produced by Lee Shubert and J. J. Shubert, the Broadway production, opened on September 12, 1927 at Jolson's 59th Street Theatre and then moved to the Casino Theatre for a total run of 312 performances. The cast included Nathaniel Wagner, George Rosener, Evelyn Herbert and over 65 others.

== Songs ==
Act I

- Strolling with the One I Love the Best
- Mr. Cupid
- Won't You Marry Me?
- Your Land and My Land
- The Same Silver Moon
- The Mocking Bird

Act II

- Strawberry Jam
- Mexico
- Something Old, Something New
- Old John Barleycorn

Act III

- Song of Victory
- Ker-Choo!
- Boys in Gray
- Mother
- Bonnie Blue Flag
- Hail Stonewall Jackson
