= George Lloyd (actor) =

American actor (1892–1967)

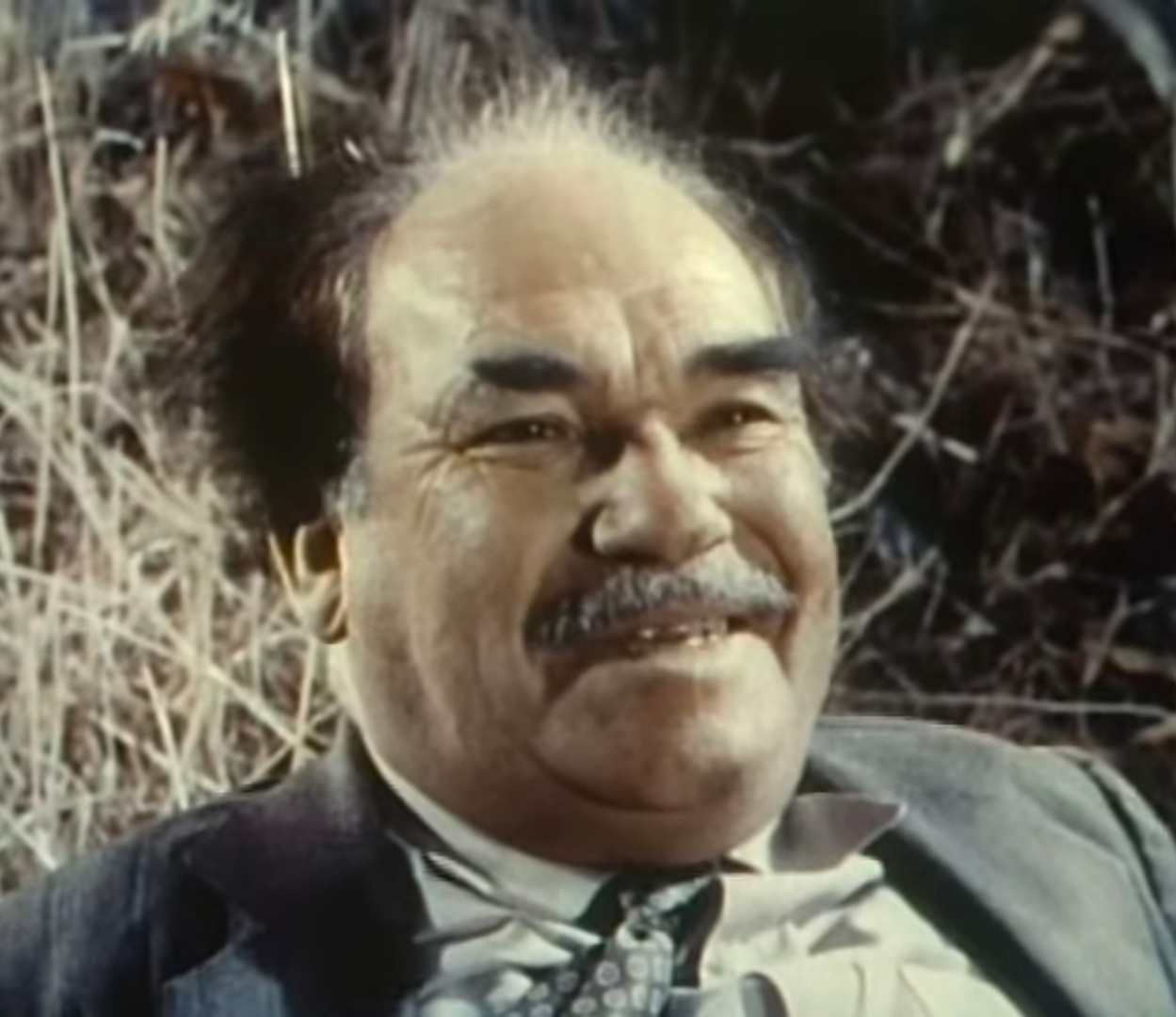
- Lloyd in Under California Stars (1948)
- Born: George Harrington Lloyd; November 5, 1892; Edinburg, Illinois, U.S.
- Died: August 15, 1967 (aged 74); West Los Angeles, California, U.S.
- Resting place: Los Angeles National Cemetery
- Other names: George H. Lloyd; George W. Lloyd
- Occupation: Actor
- Years active: 1932–1956

George Harrington Lloyd (November 5, 1892 – August 15, 1967) was an American vaudevillian and character actor. Born in Edinburg, Illinois, Lloyd appeared in over 270 films between 1932 and 1956.

== Career ==
In the late 1920s, Lloyd had his own vaudeville troupe.

Lloyd appeared in the Three Stooges short subject Pardon My Clutch (1948) as the angry gas station attendant. He was also Squid McGuffy, café owner, in Crime on Their Hands (1948) and its remake, Hot Ice (1955). Other appearances include Mississippi (1935), The Return of Jimmy Valentine (1936), High Sierra (1941), Topper Returns (1941) and My Favorite Brunette (1947). In the 1940s-era morality play I Accuse My Parents (parodied by Mystery Science Theater 3000), he was kindly cafe owner Al, "mistaken" by the MST3K crew for Off.

== Personal life ==
Lloyd retired from films as a character actor in 1955. He died after a cerebrovascular accident on August 15, 1967. Lloyd had been suffering from arteriosclerosis as well at the time of his death. He is interred at the Los Angeles National Cemetery in West Los Angeles, California.

== Partial filmography ==
- Mississippi (1935)
- Circus Shadows (1935)
- Bulldog Edition (1936)
- Wanted! Jane Turner (1936)
- The Magnificent Brute (1936)
- Road Gang (1936)
- Smart Blonde (1937)
- The Case of the Stuttering Bishop (1937)
- Idol of the Crowds (1937)
- Counsel for Crime (1937)
- Thanks for Listening (1937)
- San Quentin (1937) as Convict
- Mr. Wong, Detective (1938)
- Prison Train (1938)
- Devil's Island (1939)
- Behind Prison Gates (1939)
- The Oklahoma Kid (1939) as a Bartender (uncredited)
- They Drive By Night (1940) as Barney (uncredited)
- The Return of Wild Bill (1940)
- She Knew All the Answers (1941)
- Blues in the Night (1941)
- Mokey (1942)
- Hello, Frisco, Hello (1943)
- She Has What It Takes
- The Dancing Masters (1943)
- Destination Tokyo (1943)
- San Diego, I Love You (1944)
- I Accuse My Parents (1944)
- Fog Island (1945)
- The Royal Mounted Rides Again (1945) serial
- The Time, the Place and the Girl (1946) unbilled
- Home in Oklahoma (1946)
- Swing the Western Way (1947)
- Vigilantes of Boomtown (1947)
- Sinbad the Sailor (1947) as Lancer Guard (uncredited)
- Under California Stars (1948)
- French Leave (1948)
- Bodyhold (1949)
- Death Valley Gunfighter (1949)
- The Pecos Pistol (1949)
- Laramie (1949)
