= Savage Mutiny =

1953 film

- Directed by: Spencer Gordon Bennet
- Screenplay by: Sol Shor
- Based on: Jungle Jim; 1934-1954 comic strip by Don Moore and Alex Raymond
- Produced by: Sam Katzman
- Starring: Johnny Weissmuller; Angela Stevens; Lester Matthews
- Cinematography: William P. Whitley
- Edited by: Henry Batista
- Music by: Mischa Bakaleinikoff
- Production company: Columbia Pictures
- Distributed by: Columbia Pictures
- Release date: February 3, 1953
- Country: United States
- Language: English

Savage Mutiny is a 1953 Jungle Jim film starring Johnny Weissmuller. It is the tenth entry in the series.

== Cast ==
- Johnny Weissmuller as Jungle Jim
- Angela Stevens as Joan Harris
- Lester Matthews as Major Walsh
- Nelson Leigh as Dr. Parker
- Charles Stevens as Chief Wamai
- Paul Marion as Lutembi
- Gregory Gaye as Carl Kroman
- Leonard Penn as Emil Bruno
- Ted Thorpe as Paul Benek
- Tamba as Tamba The Chimp
