= Nellie Breen =

American actress (1897–1986)

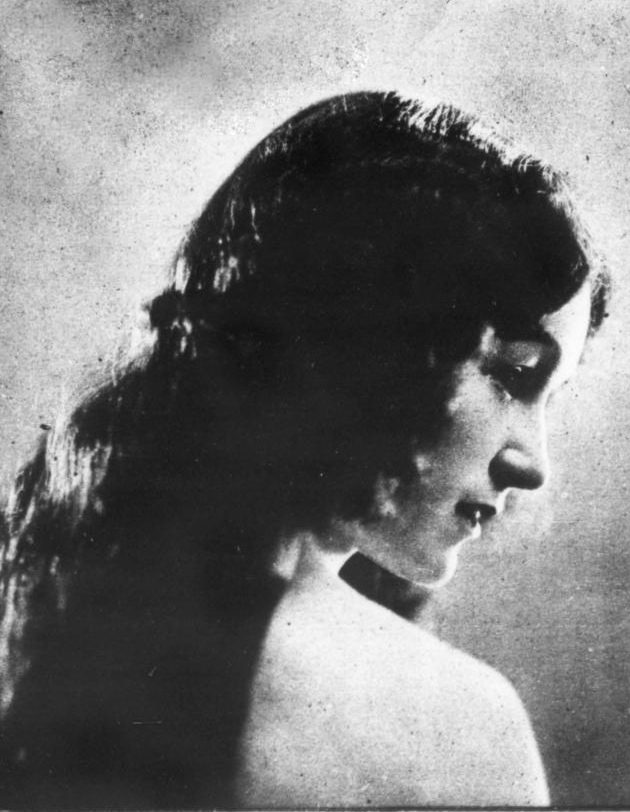
Breen in 1922

Nellie Breen (April 3, 1897 – April 26, 1986) was an American dancer and comedian. Trained as a ballet dancer, she worked in vaudeville as part of a dancing and juggling family act with her father and her siblings in her early career. While performing in this group she intermittently took time off to work as a featured ballerina in Broadway revues like Everything (1919), George White's Scandals (1921), and The Passing Show of 1922. She later worked in vaudeville in a double act with Lester Allen where her gifts as an eccentric dancer and comedian were employed. Her other Broadway theater credits included Ginger (1923), Mercenary Mary (1925), Florida Girl (1925), and The Desert Song (1926).

== Life and career ==
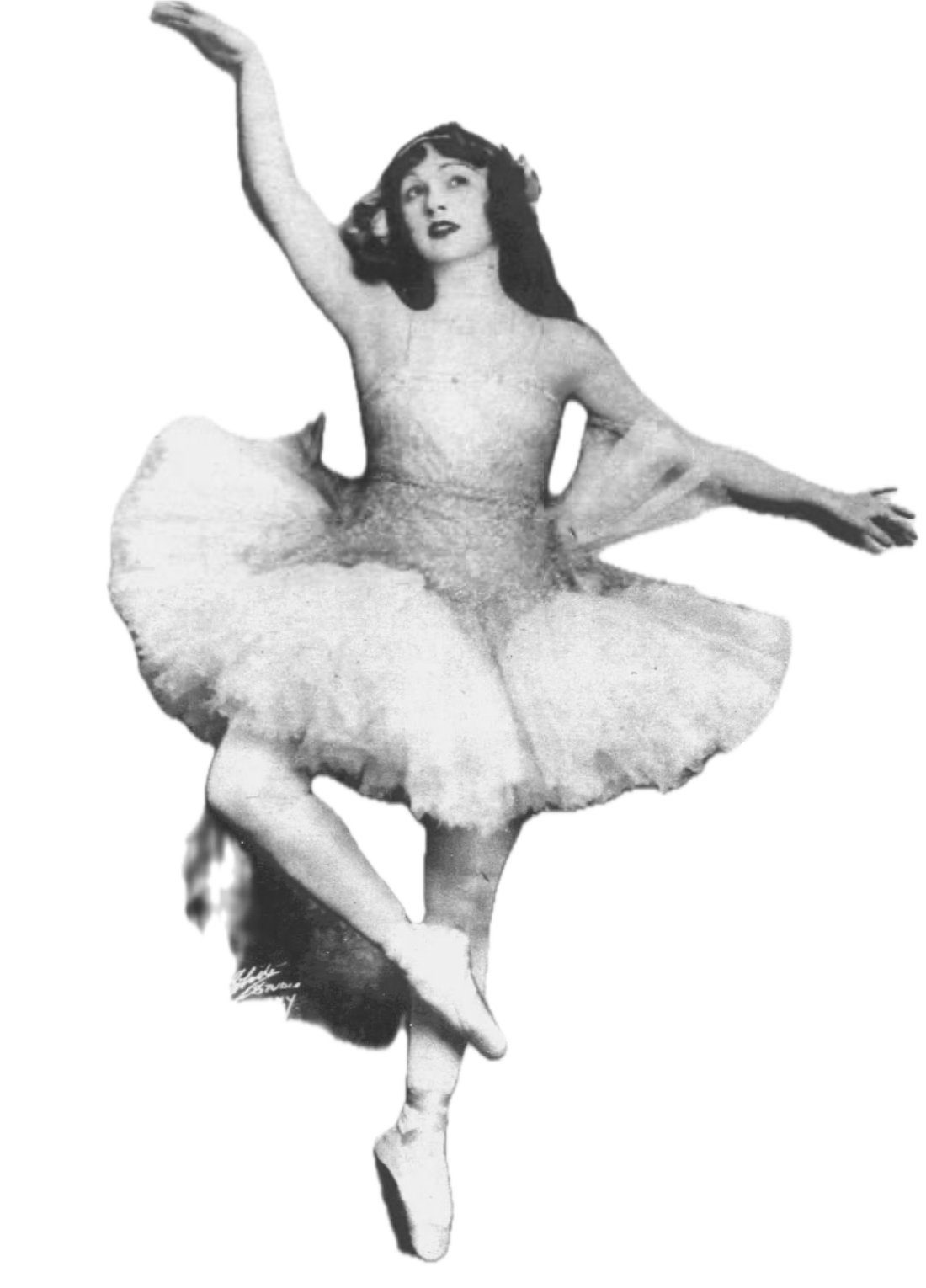
Nellie Breen in The Passing Show of 1922

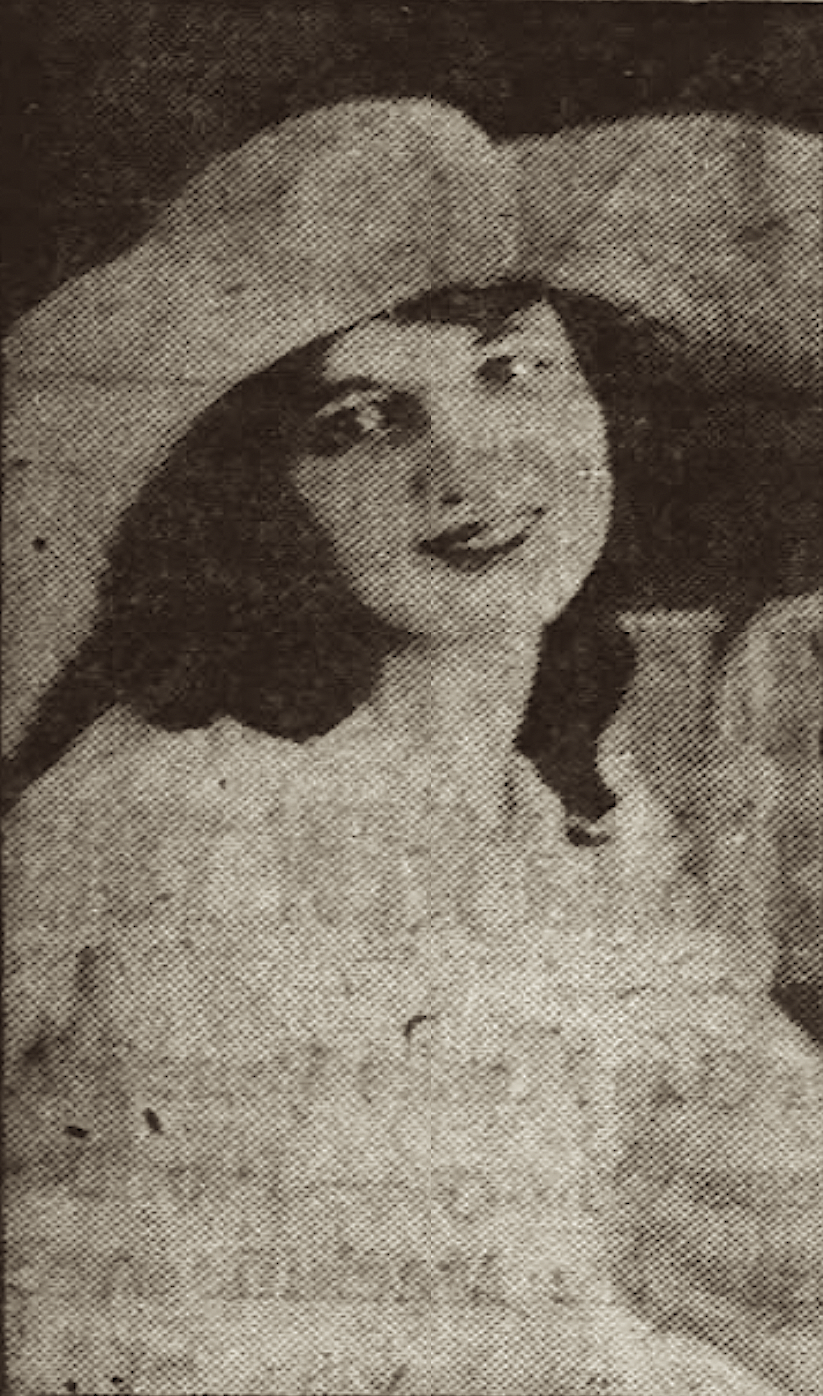
Breen in 1921.

The daughter of Thomas and Mary Breen, Nellie Breen was born April 3, 1897, in Lawrence, Massachusetts. Her mother was of Australian birth, and her father was Irish American. Her sister, Margaret Breen, was also a performer. Nellie trained as a ballet dancer with Luigi Albertieri, dance master of the Metropolitan Opera, in New York City, and also studied dance in Paris and Milan. The Breen family maintained a home in Lawrence, where they lived in the summers while not on tour as a group of family entertainers. As a child, Nellie toured Europe as part of the family dance troupe. By 1914, she was acting on the stage in the role of Anset in the United States touring company of Louis N. Parker's Joseph and His Brethren with a cast led by James O'Neill as Pharaoh. In 1915, she portrayed a waitress in a touring production of the musical The Girl from Utah.

By June 1916 Nellie was working in vaudeville in the B. F. Keith Circuit as part of a dancing family act led by her father. Newspaper accounts from this period state that Nellie and her family members had previously performed with David C. Montgomery and Fred Stone in the musical Chin Chin. She toured in vaudeville in this family act in 1917. The Montreal Star review described Nellie as "a clever toe dancer" whose act featured juggling as well as dancing. A January 1918 review of the Breen family act in The Brooklyn Daily Times praised Nellie's brother Tom for his juggling and stated that there were four Breen family members included in the show. A May 1918 review in The Atlanta Constitution described the act as consisting of Nellie, her father, her brother, and her sister.

Breen was a featured dancer in the Broadway musical revue Everything, a work produced by Charles Dillingham and featuring music by John Philip Sousa and Irving Berlin, that was staged by R. H. Burnside at the Hippodrome Theatre. She danced as a soloist in the style of French ballet in this production which ran from August 22, 1918, through May 17, 1919. After this show closed, she resumed touring in vaudeville in the Breen family act until being hired as a prima ballerina in the Broadway cast of George White's Scandals of 1921. After this show closed in New York City, she toured in the production to the Majestic Theatre in Buffalo, New York in September 1921, and then to other cities with a final stop in Louisville, Kentucky in October 1921.

Nellie continued once again in the Breen family dance act, until joining The Passing Show revue in September 1922. She was the head dancer in this production which ran at the Winter Garden Theatre until closing in December 1922. She then toured in this show in the spring of 1923. The following fall she appeared as Ruth Warewell in Harold Orlob's Ginger at the Daly's 63rd Street Theatre; the show flopped and only had a short run. After this she worked in vaudeville in the first part of 1924 in a musical comedy number, All Through a Letter, with Joe Mack as her partner. The following fall she was partnered with Hal Skelly in vaudeville's Orpheum Circuit with whom she began performing eccentric dance in a work called The Mutual Man.

Breen returned to Broadway as Norah in William B. Friedlander and Con Conrad's Mercenary Mary, a moderately successful show which ran at the Longacre Theatre from April 13, 1925 until August 8, 1925. Immediately following this she worked in another Broadway flop, appearing as Betty in Milton Suskind's Florida Girl which had a short run at the Lyric Theatre in November and December 1925. However, she appeared in this production with Lester Allen who subsequently became her longtime comedy partner in vaudeville. They also appeared together in The Earl Carroll Vanities in 1926. That same year Breen starred in the new musical Castles in the Air for its Chicago run at the Olympia Theater. However, she was replaced by another actress when the production moved to Broadway.

The most successful Broadway show of Nellie's career was The Desert Song which opened at the Casino Theatre on November 30, 1926. Breen portrayed Susan in this show and was featured singing the song "Let's Have a Love Affair". A hit production, it ran for 471 performances on Broadway, closing on January 7, 1928. However, she did not stay in the production for its full run, and by November 1927 had left the show to resume performing in vaudeville with Lester Allen. The pair continued to perform together in comedy acts on and off until as late as 1938. She also occasionally worked in radio with the Historical Dictionary of Vaudeville stating "she is believed to have performed the first tap dance on radio in 1922", an event described in that book as an "odd choice" for an audio-only medium.

Nellie Breen died in Santa Clara County, California, on April 26, 1986, at the age of 89.
