= Up in Daisy's Penthouse =

1953 American short film by Jules White

- Directed by: Jules White
- Screenplay by: Jack White
- Story by: Clyde Bruckman
- Produced by: Jules White
- Starring: Moe Howard; Larry Fine; Shemp Howard; Connie Cezon; Blackie Whiteford; Jack Kenney; John Merton; Curly Howard
- Cinematography: Henry Freulich
- Edited by: Edwin H. Bryant
- Distributed by: Columbia Pictures
- Release date: February 5, 1953 (U.S.)
- Running time: 16:38
- Country: United States
- Language: English

Up in Daisy's Penthouse is a 1953 short subject directed by Jules White starring American slapstick comedy team The Three Stooges (Moe Howard, Larry Fine and Shemp Howard). It is the 144th entry in the series released by Columbia Pictures starring the comedians, who released 190 shorts for the studio between 1934 and 1959.

== Plot ==
The Stooges awaken to their mother's distressing revelation regarding their father's divorce, precipitated by his newfound wealth through an oil well venture. Their father (Shemp Howard in a dual role), stands poised to marry Daisy, a youthful and opportunistic blonde, that same day. Driven by familial concern, the Stooges embark on a mission to thwart the impending nuptials.

However, complications ensue as the visual resemblance between Shemp and his father confounds the matrimonial proceedings, resulting in Daisy inadvertently marrying the wrong man. As the narrative progresses, the Stooges find themselves entangled in perilous circumstances orchestrated by nefarious individuals intent on seizing their father's newfound riches. Despite these adversities, the Stooges demonstrate resourcefulness and fortitude, ultimately rescuing their father from imminent danger.

== Cast ==
=== Credited ===
- Moe Howard as Moe Howard
- Larry Fine as Larry Fine
- Shemp Howard as Shemp Howard and Shemp "Pop" Howard Sr.
- Connie Cezon as Daisy Flowers
- John Merton as Butch
- Jack Kenney as Chopper

=== Uncredited ===
- Heinie Conklin as Justice of the Peace
- Suzanne Ridgeway as Maid
- Blackie Whiteford as Thug guarding stairs
- Unknown actress as Ma Howard

== Production notes ==
Up in Daisy's Penthouse is a remake of 3 Dumb Clucks, using minimal footage from the original film. This is noticeable when the trio are on the flagpole, as audio of Curly's "woo woo"s can be heard, the first commemoration of former Stooge Curly Howard's death on January 18, 1952.
