= Margaret Breen =

American actress (1907–1960)

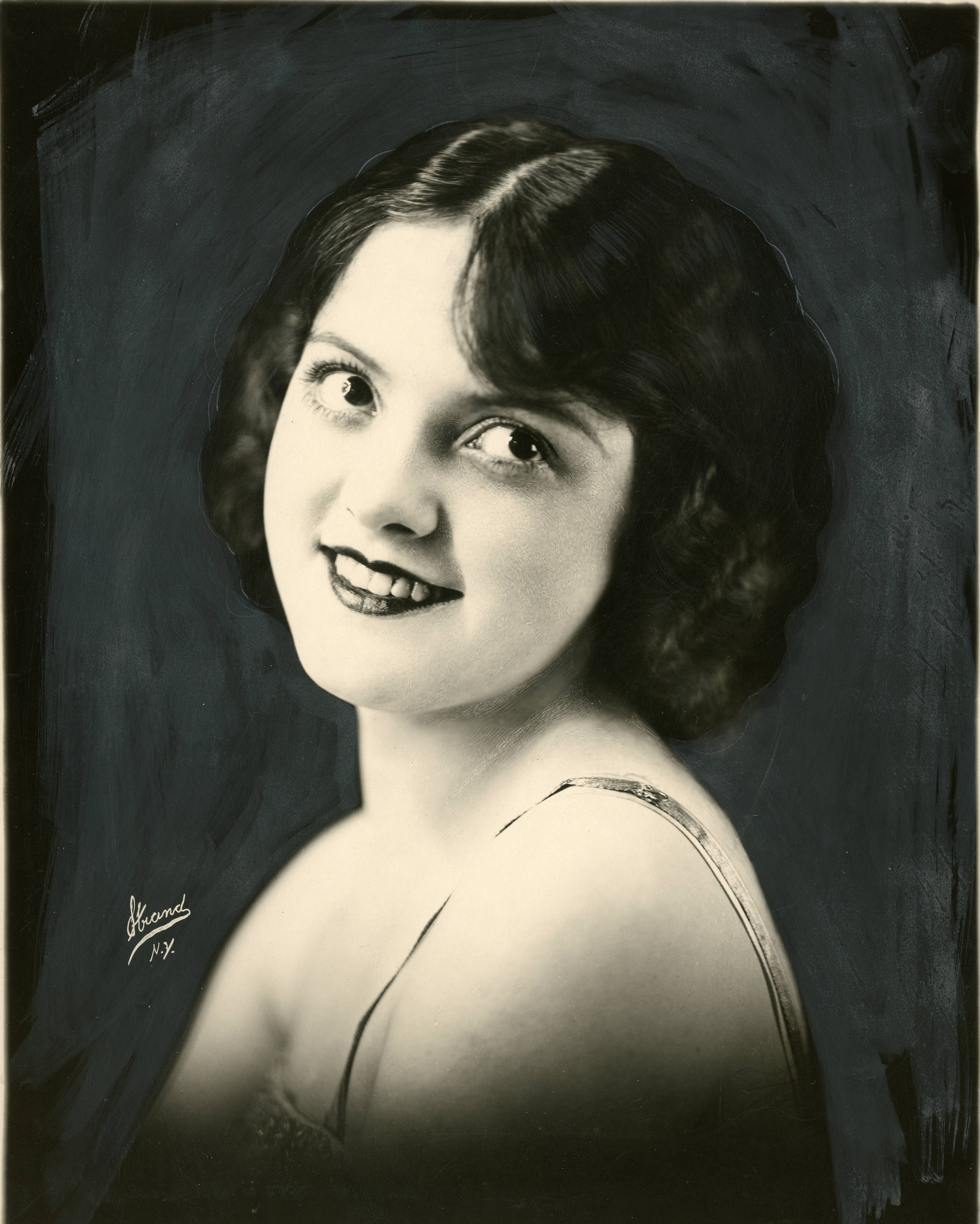
Actress Margaret Breen

Margaret Breen (February 3, 1907 – December 5, 1960) was an American stage and film actress.

== Biography ==
Margaret Breen was born in Missouri on February 3, 1907. She came from a theatrical family; ten of her eleven siblings, including Nellie Breen, were in show business. She performed on stage at the age of four.

Breen performed in several Broadway shows, including George White's Scandals, in the 1920s and in several short films in the early 1930s.

She married Art Hamburger, a miner and millionaire, in 1931. They lived in Plymouth, California. They had a son and a daughter in the 1930s.

Breen died in California on December 5, 1960.

== Selected stage credits ==
- George White's Scandals, June 18 – November 10, 1923; June 30 – December 13, 1924
- The Passing Show, 1925
- Princess Flavia, as Helga, November 2, 1925 – March 13, 1926
- The Merry World, June 8 – August 21, 1926
- Peggy-Ann, as Patricia Seymour, December 27, 1926 – October 29, 1927
- Simple Simon, as Elaine King, March 9 – March 21, 1931

== Filmography ==
- Heads Up (1930) as Mary Trumbull
- It Might Be Worse (1931 short) as Ethel
- The Tamale Vendor (1931 short)
- Selling Shorts (1931 short) as The Girl
