= Heads Up (1930 film) =

1930 film by Victor Schertzinger

- Directed by: Victor Schertzinger
- Screenplay by: Lorenz Hart; Rick Kirkland; John McGowan; Richard Rodgers; Paul Gerard Smith; Louis Stevens
- Starring: Charles "Buddy" Rogers; Helen Kane; Victor Moore; Helen Carrington; Margaret Breen; Gene Gowing; Harry Shannon
- Cinematography: William O. Steiner
- Music by: Richard Rodgers
- Production company: Paramount Pictures
- Distributed by: Paramount Pictures
- Release date: October 11, 1930
- Running time: 76 minutes
- Country: United States
- Language: English

Heads Up is a 1930 American Pre-Code comedy film directed by Victor Schertzinger and written by Lorenz Hart, Rick Kirkland, John McGowan, Richard Rodgers, Paul Gerard Smith and Louis Stevens. The film stars Charles "Buddy" Rogers, Helen Kane, Victor Moore, Helen Carrington, and Harry Shannon. The film was released on October 11, 1930, by Paramount Pictures.

== Cast ==
- Charles "Buddy" Rogers as Jack Mason
- Helen Kane as Betty Trumbul
- Victor Moore as Skippy Dugan
- Helen Carrington as Mrs. Martha Trumbull
- Margaret Breen as Mary Trunbull
- Gene Gowing as Rex Cutting
- Harry Shannon as Capt. Denny

== Production ==
Yacht scenes were filmed in Port Washington, New York, with a sound truck on shore and another on an adjoining barge to capture the sound on board. Paramount location chief O.V. Johnson was sent on location to New London, Connecticut to film the U.S. Coast Guard.
