= Angela Stevens =

American actress and singer (1925–2016)

- Born: Ann Evelyn Allen; May 8, 1925; Eagle Rock, Los Angeles, California, U.S.
- Died: March 17, 2016 (aged 90); Sun City, Menifee, California, U.S.
- Other names: Ann Zika
- Occupation: Actress
- Years active: 1950–63
- Spouse: George Zika (1940s-1999)
- Children: 2

Angela Stevens (born Ann Evelyn Allen, May 8, 1925 – March 17, 2016) was an American film actress and singer.

== Biography ==
Stevens was born in Eagle Rock, California. She appeared in several Three Stooges films, such as He Cooked His Goose, Pardon My Backfire and Blunder Boys. Other credits include The Hoodlum, The Sun Was Setting by Edward D. Wood Jr, Without Warning!, Creature with the Atom Brain, The Harder They Fall and The Wild One.

In 1955, Stevens sued a dress shop owner for $36,500, saying that an attack from a "wild and vicious" ocelot disfigured her, which cost her a role in a film.

Stevens married George Zika in the early 1940s

== Filmography ==
=== Feature films ===
- Utah Blaine (1957) as Mary Blake
- The Shadow on the Window (1957) as Myra
- The Harder They Fall (1956) as Girl
- Blackjack Ketchum, Desperado (1956) as Laurie Webster
- The Naked Street (1955) as Janet
- Women's Prison (1955) as Prisoner
- Creature with the Atom Brain (1955) as Joyce Walker
- Devil Goddess (1955) as Nora Blakely
- The Wild One (1954) as Betty
- The Last Time I Saw Paris (1954) as Pert young girl
- Savage Mutiny (1953) as Joan Harris
- Jack McCall, Desperado (1953) as Rose Griffith
- From Here to Eternity (1953) as Jean
- The Mississippi Gambler (1953) as Girl
- Without Warning! (1952) as Blonde
- Eight Iron Men (1952)
- The Kid from Broken Gun (1952) as Gail Kingston
- Outlaw Women (1952)
- Just This Once (1952) as Girl
- In Old Amarillo (1951) as Bar girl
- Two Tickets to Broadway (1951) as Blonde
- The Hoodlum (1951) as Christie Lang
- Iron Man (1951) as Girl
- Katie Did It (1951) as Taffy
