= Nanette Bordeaux =

Canadian-American film actress (1911–1956)

- Bordeaux in the 1940s
- Born: Hélène Olivine Veilleux; April 3, 1911; Saint-Georges, Quebec, Canada
- Died: September 20, 1956 (aged 45); Los Angeles, California, U.S.
- Other names: Francine Bordeaux
- Years active: 1942–1956

Hélène Olivine Veilleux (April 3, 1911 – September 20, 1956), known professionally as Nanette Bordeaux, was a French Canadian-born American film actress. Bordeaux made over 15 film appearances between 1942 and 1956.

== Career ==
Bordeaux moved with her family from Quebec to New York City in the 1930s, where she began auditioning for several theatre productions. By 1938, Bordeaux did a screen test at the Hal Roach Studios, and was chosen over 50 other actresses. She made appearances in several small movies in the 1940s, under the name Francine Bordeaux.

Bordeaux was hired by Columbia Pictures director Jules White in 1949, and began appearing in several short subjects, most notably with the Three Stooges. As she sported a genuine French accent, she was often cast as a "Fifi," in films such as Hugs and Mugs, Pest Man Wins, A Missed Fortune and Loose Loot. She also had to hide her French accent under an American one in such films as Slaphappy Sleuths and Income Tax Sappy.

== Death ==
Bordeaux's career was cut short when she died of acute bronchopneumonia on September 20, 1956, at age 45. Her last film, A Merry Mix Up, was released six months after her death.

== Selected filmography ==
- I Married an Angel (1942) (as Francine Bordeaux)
- Women in Bondage (1943) (as Francine Bordeaux)
- So Dark the Night (1946) (as Francine Bordeaux)
- Homecoming (1948) (as Francine Bordeaux)
- Flung by a Fling (1949)
- Hugs and Mugs (1950)
- Three Hams on Rye (1950)
- Pest Man Wins (1951)
- A Missed Fortune (1952)
- Loose Loot (1953)
- He Popped His Pistol (1953)
- Come on Seven (1956)
- A Merry Mix Up (1957)
