= Hugs and Mugs =

1950 film by Jules White

- Directed by: Jules White
- Written by: Clyde Bruckman
- Produced by: Jules White
- Starring: Moe Howard; Larry Fine; Shemp Howard; Christine McIntyre; Nanette Bordeaux; Kathleen O'Malley; Emil Sitka; Joe Palma; Pat Moran; Blackie Whiteford
- Cinematography: Vincent J. Farrar
- Edited by: Edwin Bryant
- Distributed by: Columbia Pictures
- Release date: February 2, 1950 (U.S.)
- Running time: 15:57
- Country: United States
- Language: English

Hugs and Mugs is a 1950 short subject directed by Jules White starring American slapstick comedy team The Three Stooges (Moe Howard, Larry Fine and Shemp Howard). It is the 121st entry in the series released by Columbia Pictures starring the comedians, who released 190 shorts for the studio between 1934 and 1959.

== Plot ==
Following a period of incarceration for jewel theft, three alluring women embark on a quest to locate a pearl necklace that eluded detection by law enforcement. However, their endeavors encounter an obstacle when the warehouse wherein they concealed the necklace is sold to the Shangri-La Upholstering Company, managed by the Stooges.

As the Stooges undertake the restoration and pricing of assorted furniture pieces, Shemp inadvertently discovers the necklace and opts to retain it for himself, despite Larry and Moe dismissing it as mere "beads." Subsequently, the women feign flirtation with the Stooges as a diversionary tactic to scour the shop for the necklace, inadvertently causing damage to an upholstered chair. Despite Shemp's conviction that the pearls are counterfeit, he endeavors to relinquish the necklace to the women. However, their former gangster partners trace their whereabouts to the shop, demanding the necklace.

The ensuing chaos culminates in a six-way altercation, with the Stooges valiantly defending the women against the aggressors. Shemp ultimately incapacitates the gangsters with a well-aimed blow from an iron, rendering them unconscious. Prompted by this turn of events, the women renounce their criminal past and elect to return the pearls to their rightful owners.

== Cast ==
=== Credited ===
- Moe Howard as Moe
- Larry Fine as Larry
- Shemp Howard as Shemp
- Christine McIntyre as Lily
- Nanette Bordeaux as Fifi
- Kathleen O'Malley as Ella

=== Uncredited ===
- Emil Sitka as Warehouse clerk
- Joe Palma as Muggsy
- Blackie Whiteford as Bill
- Pat Moran as Red

== Production notes ==
Hugs and Mugs was filmed over three days on February 15–17, 1949.

The comedic device wherein a sofa spring becomes inadvertently affixed to an individual's posterior is also featured in Hoi Polloi (1935), Three Little Sew and Sews (1939), An Ache in Every Stake (1941) and Have Rocket, Will Travel (1959).
