= A Missed Fortune =

1952 American short film by Jules White

- Directed by: Jules White
- Screenplay by: Jack White
- Story by: Searle Kramer
- Produced by: Jules White
- Starring: Moe Howard; Larry Fine; Shemp Howard; Vernon Dent; Stanley Blystone; Nanette Bordeaux; Vivian Mason; Suzanne Ridgeway
- Cinematography: Fayte M. Browne
- Edited by: Henry DeMond
- Distributed by: Columbia Pictures
- Release date: January 3, 1952 (U.S.)
- Running time: 16:06
- Country: United States
- Language: English

A Missed Fortune is a 1952 short subject directed by Jules White starring American slapstick comedy team The Three Stooges (Moe Howard, Larry Fine and Shemp Howard). It is the 137th entry in the series released by Columbia Pictures starring the comedians, who released 190 shorts for the studio between 1934 and 1959.

== Plot ==
Shemp unexpectedly wins a substantial sum of $50,000 by correctly identifying a car make in a radio contest. The trio subsequently lodges at the opulent Hotel Costa Plente, where they promptly deplete their winnings. Despite their lavish surroundings, they inadvertently damage numerous expensive furnishings within their suite. Their misfortune is compounded when the hotel manager, upon delivering a telegram, reveals that a significant portion of Shemp's prize money has been withheld for taxes, leaving them with a mere $4.85.

Their predicament takes a further downturn when three opportunistic gold diggers, also guests at the hotel, manage to gain access to the Stooges' room through deceptive means. Following two accidental dousings with ice water initiated by the trio, the women retaliate by striking the Stooges over the head with champagne bottles.

== Production notes ==
Filmed over two days in 1951 (January 22–23), A Missed Fortune is a remake of 1938's Healthy, Wealthy and Dumb, using minimal stock footage. When Shemp falls onto the top of the bed, the footage is actually Curly borrowed from Healthy, Wealthy and Dumb (Curly can be heard yelling during the fall). Additionally, Larry taking a bath as well as the close-up of Moe yelling "Get this Henry the VIII off my neck!" is also stock. A slight inconsistency can be noted, as the pattern on the wood changes from shot to shot. The glue Moe accidentally pours onto his hotcakes, "Stik Fast Glue", is the same product Curly writes a slogan for in Healthy, Wealthy and Dumb.

This is the last Three Stooges film to be released during Curly Howard's lifetime. He died on January 18, 1952.
