= Corny Casanovas =

1952 American short film by Jules White

- Film poster
- Directed by: Jules White
- Written by: Felix Adler
- Produced by: Jules White
- Starring: Moe Howard; Larry Fine; Shemp Howard; Connie Cezan
- Cinematography: Henry Freulich
- Edited by: Aaron Stell
- Distributed by: Columbia Pictures
- Release date: May 1, 1952 (U.S.)
- Running time: 16:24
- Country: United States
- Language: English

Corny Casanovas is a 1952 short subject directed by Jules White starring American slapstick comedy team The Three Stooges (Moe Howard, Larry Fine and Shemp Howard). It is the 139th entry in the series released by Columbia Pictures starring the comedians, who released 190 shorts for the studio between 1934 and 1959.

== Plot ==
The Stooges engage in household chores with joyful anticipation of their impending marriages, oblivious to the fact that they are all betrothed to the same woman, Mabel.

Amidst their cleaning endeavors, comedic mishaps abound. Shemp, in an attempt to utilize a pistol handle as a makeshift hammer, inadvertently triggers the firearm, resulting in Moe's distinctive sugarbowl hairstyle being split down the middle. Subsequently, their efforts to reupholster a davenport lead to further chaos, with Moe enduring various indignities including having his clothing mistakenly trimmed and being bombarded with upholstering tacks from a makeshift machine gun.

Following the completion of their chores, each Stooge separately ventures to Mabel's residence to propose, each bearing an engagement ring. The revelation of their shared engagement prompts a frenzied altercation, culminating in the Stooges incapacitating each other. Seizing the opportunity, Mabel swiftly procures three engagement rings and slips away amidst the chaos.

== Production notes ==
Corny Casanovas was filmed on December 3–5, 1951. It was remade with Joe Besser in 1957 as Rusty Romeos, using ample recycled footage. A mild variation of the Stooges' theme song "Three Blind Mice" was used for this film. This version would be used throughout 1952.

Director Jules White distinguished himself through the incorporation of numerous comedic elements centered around physical humor, particularly involving depictions of violence directed at the buttocks. While such humor was perceived as coarse by other directors at Columbia Pictures, White viewed it as integral to the comedic essence of the Stooges' brand. He maintained a steadfast commitment to this style of humor, considering it a defining characteristic of the Stooges' comedic repertoire, and thus, essential to the authenticity of their comedic performances.

== Memorable quotes ==
- Larry: "The tacks won't come out!"
- Shemp: "They went in. Maybe they're income tacks!"
