= Women in Bondage =

1943 film by Steve Sekely

- Directed by: Steve Sekely
- Written by: Houston Branch; Frank Wisbar (story)
- Produced by: Trem Carr (executive producer); Herman Millakowsky (producer); Jeffrey Bernerd (associate producer)
- Starring: Gail Patrick; Nancy Kelly; William Henry
- Cinematography: Mack Stengler
- Edited by: Richard Currier
- Music by: Edward J. Kay
- Distributed by: Monogram Pictures
- Release date: 1943
- Running time: 72 minutes
- Country: United States
- Language: English
- Budget: $104,000
- Box office: $1,000,000

Women in Bondage is a 1943 World War II film about conditions for women under Hitler's regime directed by Steve Sekely and starring Gail Patrick and Nancy Kelly. The plot involves two women imprisoned for speaking out against the government.

== Cast ==
- Gail Patrick as Margot Bracken
- Nancy Kelly as Toni Hall
- William Henry as Heinz Radtke (as Bill Henry)
- Tala Birell as Ruth Bracken
- Gertrude Michael as District Director Schneider
- Alan Baxter as Otto Bracken
- Maris Wrixon as Grete Ziegler
- Rita Quigley as Herta Rumann
- Felix Basch as Dr. Mensch
- H.B. Warner as Pastor Renz
- Anne Nagel as Deputy District Director
- Mary Forbes as Gladys Bracken
- Roland Varno as Ernest Bracken
- Nanette Bordeaux (billed as Francine Bordeaux) as Litzl Neumann

== Reception ==
The film was one of the most successful in the history of Monogram.
