= A Lady Without Passport =

- Theatrical release poster
- Directed by: Joseph H. Lewis
- Written by: Cyril Hume (adaptation)
- Screenplay by: Howard Dimsdale
- Story by: Lawrence Taylor
- Produced by: Samuel Marx
- Starring: Hedy Lamarr; John Hodiak
- Cinematography: Paul C. Vogel
- Edited by: Fredrick Y. Smith
- Music by: David Raksin
- Production company: Metro-Goldwyn-Mayer
- Distributed by: Metro-Goldwyn-Mayer
- Release date: August 3, 1950 (United States)
- Running time: 74 minutes
- Country: United States
- Language: English
- Budget: $1,088,000
- Box office: $1,004,000

A Lady Without Passport is a 1950 American film noir film directed by Joseph H. Lewis and starring Hedy Lamarr and John Hodiak. Written by Howard Dimsdale, the film is about a beautiful concentration-camp refugee who waits in Cuba for permission to enter the United States. An undercover immigration agent uses her as an informant to entrap the leader of an alien-smuggling ring.

== Plot ==
In the aftermath of World War II, immigrants in Cuba who are refused visas try to sneak into the United States illegally with the help of a human smuggling ring run by Palinov, a Levantine café owner. Following the death of one immigrant, American operative Pete Karczag is sent to Havana, where he poses as a Hungarian in need of Palinov's services. During his dangerous undercover investigation, Pete meets Marianne Lorress, a penniless Austrian refugee of the Buchenwald concentration camp who is waiting to be smuggled into the U.S. by Palinov. Pete plots to use her to obtain the place and time of Palinov's next operation.

However, Pete falls in love with Marianne, and convinces her to remain in Cuba. Palinov discovers Karczag's true purpose and exposes Pete to Marianne, who angrily decides to proceed with the smuggling trip. Palinov tries to have Pete killed, but Pete wrests the information from him and reports it to his superior, Frank Westlake. Palinov flies to the U.S. with Marianne and the other smuggled passengers. However, the airplane is being tracked by American authorities and is unable to refuel in Florida. Palinov and his pilot crash in the Florida Everglades in a desperate attempt to elude capture.

Palinov forces Marianne to accompany him and his pilot, seeking a boat hidden on a river. He kills one of the passengers trying to board their small raft, and the rest flee into the Everglades. Pete and Westlake pursue but are separated when Westlake prioritizes saving the lives of the remaining immigrants over arresting Palinov. Pete continues after the fugitives and Marianne. The pilot is bitten by a poisonous snake and is left behind. Pete finds the hidden boat and gives it to Palinov in exchange for Marianne, although Palinov tries but fails to shoot them during his escape. Pete reassures her that Palinov won't get far, because he has emptied the boat's fuel tank.

== Cast ==
- Hedy Lamarr as Marianne Lorress
- John Hodiak as Peter Karczag
- James Craig as Frank Westlake
- George Macready as Palinov
- Steven Geray as Frenchman
- Bruce Cowling as Archer Delby James
- Nedrick Young as Harry Nordell
- Steven Hill as Jack
- Robert Osterloh as Lt. Lannahan
- Trevor Bardette as Lt. Carfagno
- Charles Wagenheim as Ramon Santez
- Renzo Cesana as A. Sestina
- Esther Zeitlin as Beryl Sandring
- Carlo Tricoli as Mr. Sandring
- Marta Mitrovich as Elizaveth Alonescu
- Don Garner as Dmitri Matthias
- Richard Crane as Navy Flyer
- Nita Bieber as Dancer

== Production ==
The film was in production from early January through late February 1950. Its working title was Visa but was changed to A Lady Without Passport soon after production wrapped.

Hedy Lamarr initially refused to appear in the film and requested $150,000 for her work. She then negotiated a $90,000 guarantee with M-G-M studio head Louis B. Mayer, but waived script approval in return. This left her bound to a poorly received immigration drama featuring an unsympathetic protagonist. Although her agents warned her that major stars were frequently drafted to carry routine studio "programmers," she was ultimately left to make the best of sub-par material.

The Florida scenes were originally intended to take place in a hotel. When producer Samuel Marx was unable to locate an empty hotel that could be used for filming, he had the climactic scenes moved to the Everglades. The scenes in Cuba were shot on location.

== Reception ==
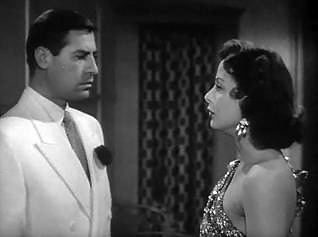
Hodiak and Lamarr

In a contemporary review for The New York Times, critic A. H. Weiler wrote: "Romance is slightly more important than reason in this number, and while the scenery, meaning Havana and Florida, is authentic and picturesque, the goings-on are as intriguing as those in any garden variety melodrama. The ring of connivers who are dedicated to smuggling aliens into this country get their come-uppance but it hardly seems worth all the effort. ... Unimpressive, come to think of it, is the word for 'A Lady Without Passport.'"

Variety praised the film: "Beginning is a bit too cryptic for quick understanding, but when plotline [adapted by Cyril Hume from a suggested story by Lawrence Taylor] does take shape, the story builds and holds attention. Joseph H. Lewis' direction spins it along expertly, neatly pacing the suspenseful sequences."

According to MGM records, the film earned $668,000 in the U.S. and Canada and $336,000 elsewhere, leading to a loss of $444,000.

== Music ==
The dramatic score for the film, an ethnic Caribbean motif, was composed by David Raksin and conducted by Johnny Green.

A suite of Raksin's music that survives on the film's master tape was issued on CD in 2009 on Film Score Monthly records.
