= Ruth Godfrey (actress) =

American actress (1922–1985)

- Godfrey in The Three Stooges film Rhythm and Weep (1946)
- Born: Ruth Godfrey; February 24, 1922; Illinois, United States
- Died: January 7, 1985 (aged 62); Northridge, Los Angeles, California, United States
- Other names: Ruth White, Ruth Godfrey White

Ruth Godfrey (February 24, 1922 – January 7, 1985) was an American film actress, best known for her work in several Three Stooges shorts. She also worked under the name of Ruth Godfrey White.

== Career ==
=== Stage ===
Godfrey danced in a production of Meet the People at La Conga, a New York night club, in 1942. She danced in Something for the Boys on Broadway in 1943 and joined other cast members in entertaining soldiers at a hospital. She and other performers, including Allen Jenkins, did a four-month tour of the Hawaiian islands with USO-Camp Shows.

=== Film ===
Godfrey was assistant dance director at Warner Brothers for ten years. She was under contract to Columbia Studios for two years, starting in 1946

She was the choreographer for The Ten Commandments at Paramount Pictures. Godfrey taught such stars as Jimmy Cagney, Gene Nelson, Jane Powell, Ann Sothern and Lucille Ball.

Godfrey first joined Columbia Pictures as a member of The Jack Cole Dancers, along with supporting actresses Nita Bieber and Gloria Patrice. All three would appear in her 1946 debut film with the Stooges, Rhythm and Weep.

She was the featured dancer in the Soundie Hats Off (1943), performing to the song "Where Did You Get That Hat?" with the Winnie Hoveler Dancers.

Godfrey appeared in several more Three Stooges films throughout the 1950s, such as Shot in the Frontier, Musty Musketeers and Pardon My Backfire. Memorably, Godfrey became the only actress in the history of the slapstick comedy trio to deliver a triple slap—twice—to the Stooges in 1957's A Merry Mix Up. Though she made less than 10 films with the comedy team, Godfrey is one of the few actresses to have worked with five of the six Stooges (Shemp Howard, Moe Howard, Larry Fine, Curly Howard and Joe Besser) on film in the various incarnations of the group.

Godfrey retired from film shortly after production of Stooge shorts films ceased in December 1957.

== Personal life and death ==
Godfrey's father-in-law was Columbia Pictures short subject head Jules White. Godfrey died of chronic obstructive pulmonary disease in the Northridge section of Los Angeles, California on January 7, 1985.
