= Princess Flavia =

Musical

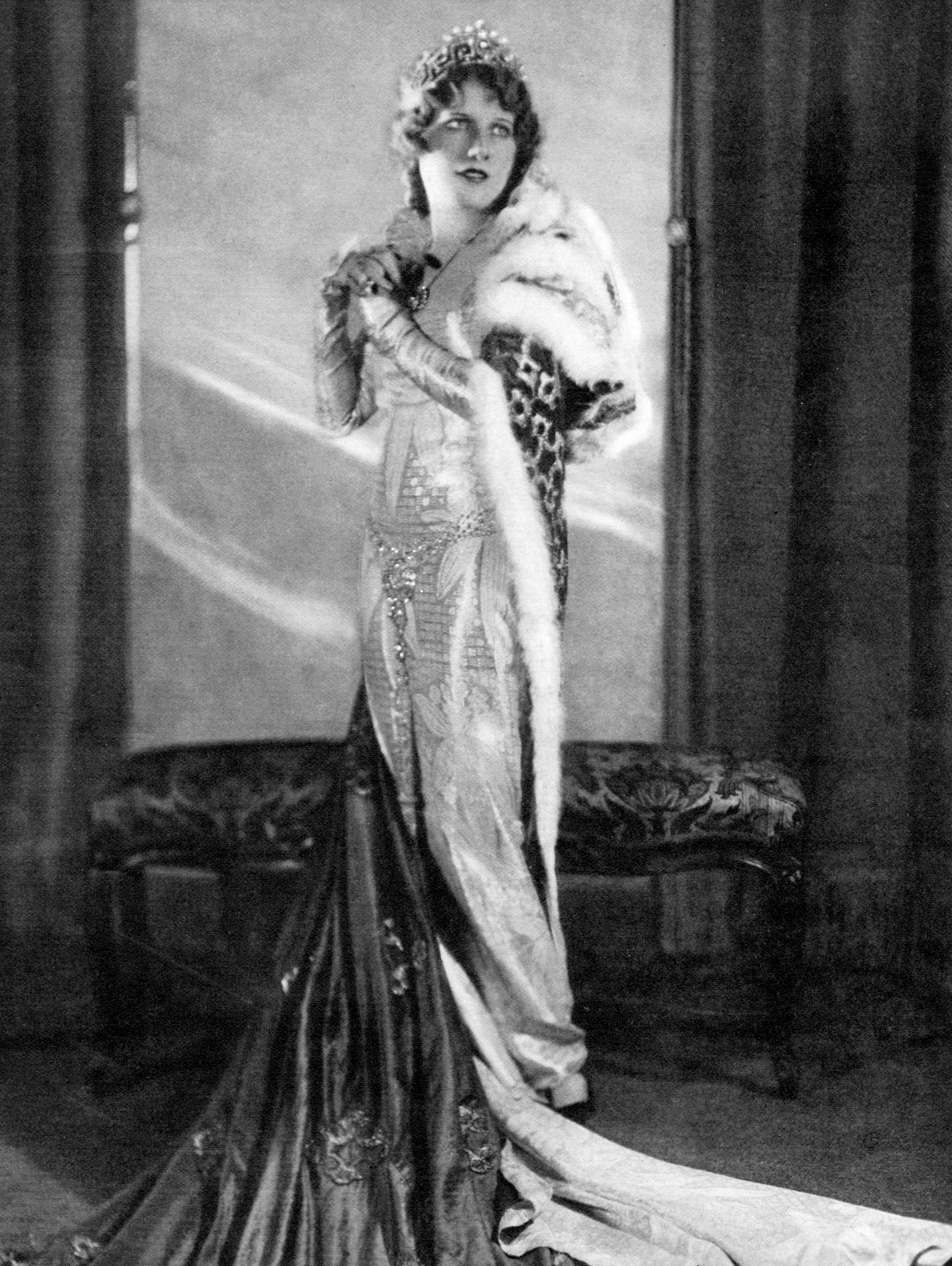
- Evelyn Herbert in the title role of Princess Flavia (1925)
- Music: Sigmund Romberg
- Lyrics: Harry B. Smith
- Book: Harry B. Smith
- Basis: 1894 novel The Prisoner of Zenda by Anthony Hope
- Premiere: November 2, 1925: Century Theatre, New York City, New York

Princess Flavia is a 1925 operetta in three acts based on Anthony Hope's novel The Prisoner of Zenda, with book and lyrics by Harry B. Smith and music by Sigmund Romberg. It is set in the fictional European country of Zenda.

== Production ==
Princess Flavia was staged by J. C. Huffman and produced by Lee Shubert and J. J. Shubert. The Broadway show opened November 2, 1925, at the Century Theatre. On February 1, 1926, it moved to the Shubert Theatre, continuing for a total run of 152 performances. The large cast was led by Harry Welchman, a popular tenor of the London stage, and soprano Evelyn Herbert.

== Cast ==
Sheet music cover

- Harry Welchman as Rudolf Rassendyl and Rudolph, Crown Prince of Ruritania
- William Pringle as General Sapt
- John Clarke as Rupert of Hentzau
- William Danforth as Franz Teppich
- James Marshall as Lieut. Fritz van Tarlenheim
- Alois Havrilla as Gilbert Bertrand
- Douglass Dumbrille as Michael
- Evelyn Herbert as Princess Flavia
- Margaret Breen as Helga
- Felicia Drenova as Antoinette de Mauban
- Maude Odell as Sophie
- Dudley Marwick as Lackey
- Edmund Ruffner as Marshal Momsen
- Joseph Calleia as Senor Poncho
- Earle Lee as Lord Topham
- Stella Shiel as Princess Edelstein
- Dudley Marwick as Innkeeper
- Alois Havrilla as Josef
- Donald Lee as Cardinal

== Songs ==
Sheet music cover

Act I

- Yes or No
- On Comrades
- Marionettes
- What Care I?
- Convent Bells are Ringing
- I Dare Not Love You
- By This Token

Act II

- Dance With Me
- Twilight Voices
- Only One

Act III

- I Love Them All
- In Ruritania

== Reception ==
The New York Times review of the premiere of Princess Flavia described the show as "beautiful, tuneful, majestic and splendid in all its appointments."

Last night's audience, a gathering of habitual theatregoers who have known the splendors of The Student Prince and Rose-Marie and The Love Song during recent months, was forced to pay homage repeatedly throughout the evening to the even greater lavishness … and the stirring choruses evoked prolonged ovations at the end of each act.

Particular praise was accorded the performances of Welchman, Herbert, Dumbrille and the large chorus, as well as the sets by Watson Barratt.
