= Melody (musical) =

Musical in three acts with music by Sigmund Romberg

Melody is a musical in three acts with music by Sigmund Romberg, lyrics by Irving Caesar, and a book by Edward Childs Carpenter. Produced and directed by George White, it premiered at the Casino Theatre on February 14, 1933. It ran there for a total of 79 performances; closing on April 22, 1933. The show was choreographed by Bobby Connolly. The sets were designed by Joseph Urban and the costumes designed by Charles LeMaire. Music directors for the show were Al Goodman and Frank Cork.

The cast of Melody was led by Evelyn Herbert in the main parts of Andree De Nemours and Paula DeLaurier. Others in the cast included George Houston as Pierre, Vicompte DeLaurier, Everett Marshall as Tristan Robillard, Walter Woolf as George Richards, Hal Skelly as François Trapadoux, and Louise Kirtland as Ninon Revelle.
