= Rusty Romeos =

1957 American short film by Jules White

- Directed by: Jules White
- Screenplay by: Jack White
- Story by: Felix Adler
- Produced by: Jules White
- Starring: Moe Howard; Larry Fine; Joe Besser; Connie Cezon
- Edited by: Saul A. Goodkind
- Distributed by: Columbia Pictures
- Release date: October 17, 1957 (U.S.)
- Running time: 16:16
- Country: United States
- Language: English

Rusty Romeos is a 1957 short subject directed by Jules White starring American slapstick comedy team The Three Stooges (Moe Howard, Larry Fine and Joe Besser). It is the 181st entry in the series released by Columbia Pictures starring the comedians, who released 190 shorts for the studio between 1934 and 1959.

== Plot ==
Upon awakening one auspicious morning, the Stooges find themselves joyously anticipating their impending nuptials. Following a hearty breakfast, they embark upon the task of tidying their abode, inadvertently wreaking havoc in the process.

Their attempts at reupholstering a Davenport sofa result in a series of mishaps, culminating in Moe being on the receiving end of several unfortunate incidents. Initially, Larry's endeavor to trim the upholstery leads to the unintended alteration of Moe's attire. Subsequently, their misguided attempt to expedite the process by employing a machine gun to dispense upholstery tacks backfires, quite literally, with Moe bearing the brunt of the mishap as he inadvertently becomes the target of the sharp projectiles, eliciting a colorful reaction.

Events unfold as the Stooges embark on their separate paths to marry their respective sweethearts, unbeknownst to them that they are all engaged to the same woman, who has given each of them a different name; Moe knows her as "Sally," Larry as "Mabel" and Joe as "Mary." The ensuing revelation sparks a tumultuous altercation, resulting in Moe and Larry rendering each other unconscious. Meanwhile, Joe, having departed earlier, returns in the midst of the chaos and employs a clever ruse to subdue the woman, ultimately administering a punitive measure involving the aforementioned tacks and rifle, followed by a comical spanking.

== Production notes ==
Rusty Romeos is a remake of 1952's Corny Casanovas, using ample stock footage from the original. New footage was shot in two days on February 12–13, 1957.

Director Jules White was known for including many violent jokes revolving around the buttocks. Many other Columbia directors felt this type of humor was crass, and often shied away from it. However, White felt this was the trademark of the Stooges' mayhem. Nothing was too crass or exaggerated to be taken seriously.

When Larry is hitting Moe's head with a fireplace shovel, Shemp Howard's portrait can be seen in the background instead of Joe's. This was because Jules White opted not to reshoot this scene, hoping that audiences would focus on the fighting Moe and Larry instead of the portrait.

== Quotes ==
  - Larry: "The tacks won't come out!"
  - Joe: "They went in; they must be income tax."
