= Connie Cezon =

American actress (1925–2004)

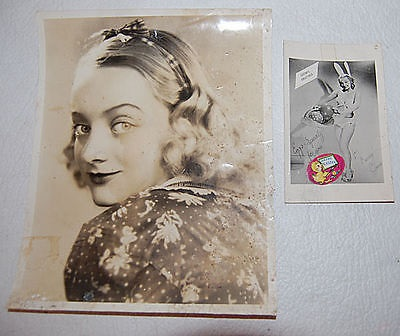
- Cezon in the 1950s
- Born: March 28, 1925; Oakland, California, U.S.
- Died: February 26, 2004 (aged 78); Glendale, California, U.S.
- Occupation: Actress
- Years active: 1951–1966

Consuelo Lord Cezon (March 28, 1925 – February 26, 2004), known professionally as Connie Cezon, was an American film actress. She made over 30 film and television appearances between 1951 and 1964.

== Early years ==
Born in Oakland, California, Cezon attended Neely Dickson's Hollywood Community School of the Theater as a child. She has a younger brother, Ricardo. She was a student in the drama department of the Fanchon and Marco School of the Theater.

== Movies and television ==
Cezon appeared in Ken Murray's Blackouts. She played a blond "gold digger" in several Three Stooges films. Her flair for physical comedy helped, and she made memorable appearances in Corny Casanovas, Up in Daisy's Penthouse, and Tricky Dicks. After leaving the Columbia shorts department, Cezon had a recurring role as Perry Mason's receptionist Gertrude "Gertie" Lade on Perry Mason between 1957 and 1964. Cezon had mixed feelings about her role as Gertie. She would have preferred having more time on screen in the show, but she acknowledged the credit's value as she sought other acting jobs. She also worked as Bette Davis' stand in and body double, most notably in the 1964 thriller Dead Ringer.

Though her surname was spelled "Cezan" in the Three Stooges films, it appears as "Cezon" in all her other appearances. Cezon confirmed that the correct spelling is the latter.

== Stage ==
Cezon appeared in the Bliss-Hayden Theater's production of Nine Girls in 1943 and in Once Over Lightly at the Wilshire Ebell Theater in 1945. She was in a revival of Broadway presented by the Equity Library Theatre in 1950, and in 1951 she had the lead role in Why Wives Worry, presented by the Fairfax-Adams Players at the Coronet Theatre in Los Angeles.

== Other activities ==
Cezon began sculpting as a hobby, but that activity turned into a business. Her works, called Connie's Creations, were displayed in well-known establishments. Her projects included one order of 500 ash trays in 1948.

After retiring from the screen in 1966, Cezon operated and ran a cat-boarding service in Los Angeles called Connie's Kitty Castle.

== Lawsuit ==
In February 1952 Cezon sued Zomba Cafe for $15,000 for invasion of privacy. The basis for the suit was that the club, which featured strip-tease dancers, displayed two life-size pictures of Cezon on the front of the building, showing her scantily clad. She lost the suit because she had signed a release that gave the photographer authorization to sell copies of the picture for publicity uses.

== Death ==
Cezon died on February 26, 2004, in Glendale, California, of complications from breast cancer surgery. She was interred alongside her parents, Pedro and Mireio, in the Great Mausoleum at Forest Lawn Memorial Park in Glendale.

== Selected filmography ==
- Boston Blackie (1951)
- Outlaw Women (1952) - One of Uncle Barney's Girls
- Corny Casanovas (1952) - Mabel
- So You Want to Go to a Convention (1952) - Fortune Teller (uncredited)
- The Abbott and Costello Show (1953) - Tunnel Girl / Stella
- Up in Daisy's Penthouse (1953) - Daisy Flowers
- Tricky Dicks (1953) - Slick Chick
- Playgirl (1954) - Girl (uncredited)
- Gang Busters (1952–1955)
- Adventures of Rin Tin Tin (1955) - Charlotte / Mollie McCoy
- Female Jungle (1955) - Connie
- Hot Stuff (1956) - Uranian Officer (uncredited)
- Rusty Romeos (1957) - Sally/Mabel/Mary
- Perry Mason (1957–1964, 17 episodes) - Gertie Lade (final appearance)
- Triple Crossed (1959) - Belle (uncredited)
- Dead Ringer (1964) - (stand-in: Bette Davis during twin scenes - uncredited)
