= Three Hams on Rye =

1950 film by Jules White

- Directed by: Jules White
- Written by: Clyde Bruckman
- Produced by: Jules White
- Starring: Moe Howard; Larry Fine; Shemp Howard; Emil Sitka; Christine McIntyre; Nanette Bordeaux; Ned Glass; Danny Lewis; Judy Malcolm; Brian O'Hara; Mildred Olsen; Blackie Whiteford
- Cinematography: Al Zeigler
- Edited by: Edwin H. Bryant
- Distributed by: Columbia Pictures
- Release date: September 7, 1950 (U.S.)
- Running time: 15:44
- Country: United States
- Language: English

Three Hams on Rye is a 1950 short subject directed by Jules White starring American slapstick comedy team The Three Stooges (Moe Howard, Larry Fine and Shemp Howard). It is the 125th entry in the series released by Columbia Pictures starring the comedians, who released 190 shorts for the studio between 1934 and 1959.

== Plot ==
The Stooges are stagehands with minor roles in the production of The Bride Wore Spurs. They regularly incur the disfavor of their producer, B.K. Doaks, whose recent theatrical endeavors have been unfavorably reviewed by renowned critic Nick Barker. Determined to ensure the success of his latest production, Doaks enlists the Stooges to prevent Barker from attending the play. However, their attempts to thwart Barker's entry are marred by their inept disguises, resulting in chaos and inadvertent confrontation with B.K. himself.

Following their failed assignment, B.K. tasks the Stooges with preparing props for the final act, including a cake and salad. Unfortunately, Moe's oversight in procuring the necessary ingredients compels the Stooges to improvise, concocting a cake and salad from scratch late into the night. Amidst the cake preparation, Shemp inadvertently contaminates the batter with a pot holder, unbeknownst to Moe.

During the climactic scene of the play, numerous actors, including the Stooges, vie for the affections of "Janie Belle" by consuming portions of her cake. However, the presence of the pot holder renders the cake nearly inedible, causing the actors to choke on feathers concealed within the confectionery. The ensuing spectacle elicits laughter from the audience, much to B.K.'s embarrassment, prompting him to abruptly halt the performance and chastise the Stooges.

Despite their dismissal, Barker perceives the play as a humorous satire and commends the Stooges' contribution, expressing interest in B.K.'s future productions. Capitalizing on this unexpected turn of events, B.K. assures Barker that the Stooges will assume prominent roles in his next endeavor, thereby securing a favorable outcome for the trio.

== Cast ==
=== Credited ===
- Moe Howard as Moe
- Larry Fine as Larry
- Shemp Howard as Shemp
- Emil Sitka as B. K. Doaks
- Christine McIntyre as Janie Belle
- Nanette Bordeaux as Lula Belle

=== Uncredited ===
- Ned Glass as Nick Barker
- Danny Lewis as Shorter actor
- Judy Malcolm as Brunette showgirl
- Brian O'Hara as Taller actor
- Mildred Olsen as Blonde showgirl
- Blackie Whiteford as Stagehand

== Production notes ==
The plot device of the coughing up feathers due to a misplaced potholder was borrowed from 1935's Uncivil Warriors. Three Hams on Rye is the fourteenth of sixteen Stooge shorts with the word "three" in the title.

Three Hams On Rye was filmed on December 14–16, 1948 but withheld from release until September 7, 1950. The 630 days between filming and releasing the short are the longest for any Shemp film released as a member of the team, Love at First Bite coming in second at 620 days.

Danny Lewis has appeared in one other Three Stooges short and was also the father of actor Jerry Lewis. According to Director Jules White, he swallowed a feather during filming.
