= Evelyn Herbert =

American opera singer and actress

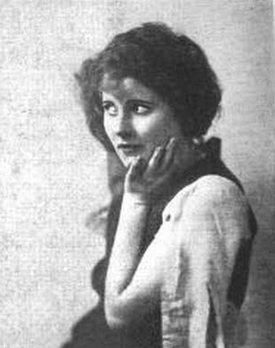
Evelyn Herbert in 1920.

Evelyn Herbert, born Evelyn Hostetter, (March 18, 1898 – 22 February 1975) was an American opera singer and musical theatre actress. She began her career as a principal soprano with the Chicago Opera Association in 1919–1920, notably creating the role of Peterkee in the world premiere of Reginald De Koven's folk opera Rip Van Winkle (1920). She worked as a performer on Broadway in operettas and musicals in the 1920s and 1930s; making her musical theatre debut in Efrem Zimbalist's Honeydew in 1920 where she was billed as Evelyn Earle in the role of Daisy.

In New York Herbert starred in several original operettas by Sigmund Romberg, including Princess Flavia (1925), My Maryland (1927), The New Moon (1928), and Melody (1933). She recorded several works by Romberg for HMV, including the popular standard "Lover, Come Back to Me" which she introduced in The New Moon. Her final Broadway appearance was in Noël Coward's Bitter Sweet in 1934.

In London's West End Herbert starred in Johann Strauss I's Waltzes in Vienna in 1931. In 1935 she was the prima donna in the United States premiere of Oscar Straus's operetta Die Teresina at the St. Louis Municipal Opera. She was married to baritone Robert Halliday with whom she performed in concerts, on stage, and in film. She retired in the mid 1930s as a result of both the decline in popularity of operetta and the financial pressures of the Great Depression. She died in California in 1975.

== Early life and career ==
Evelyn Hostetter was born on March 18, 1898 in Philadelphia, Pennsylvania. She grew up in Brooklyn. On the advice of Enrico Caruso, she studied singing with opera singer Gina Ciaparelli Viafora in New York City. She also studied acting in New York with Enrica Clay Dillon. She made her concert debut there in 1917 at the Waldorf Astoria New York in an event sponsored by the Eclectic Club, and gave a recital the following year at the Plaza Hotel under the auspices of the American Criterion Society. In 1919 she performed in a concert series organized by Mana-Zucca at the Louis H. Chalif Normal School of Dancing.

Herbert made her professional opera debut in 1919 with the Chicago Opera Association (COA) as Mimì in La bohème with Alessandro Bonci as Rodolfo. Soon after she performed in the Chicago premiere of Puccini's Il trittico as Lauretta in Gianni Schicchi. On January 2, 1920 she appeared with the COA as Peterkee in the world premiere of Reginald De Koven's folk opera Rip Van Winkle. She repeated these roles in New York City when the COA toured to the Lexington Avenue Opera House in 1920. The company also presented the United States premiere of Camille Erlanger's Aphrodite with Herbert as Myrto.

== Broadway ==
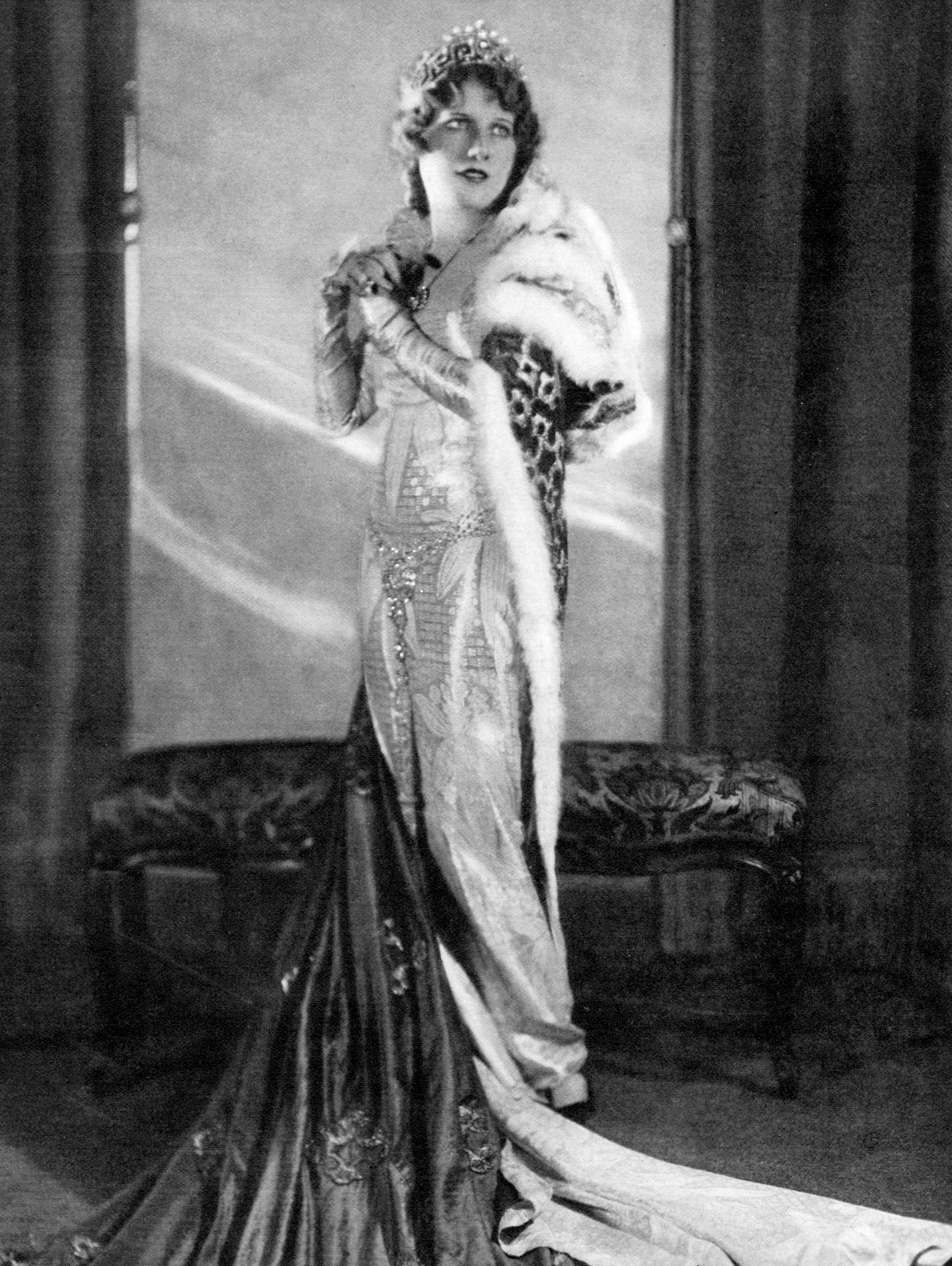
Evelyn Herbert as Princess Flavia.

In September 1920 Herbert joined the original Broadway cast of Efrem Zimbalist's musical Honeydew at the Casino Theatre where she was billed as Evelyn Earle in the role of Daisy. She then became a member of Samuel Roxy Rothafel's "Roxy Gang" which performed regular concerts with orchestra broadcast live on the radio from the Capitol Theatre, New York City. She performed as a soloist in many concerts with the Capitol Theatre Orchestra led by conductor Ernö Rapée These were often presented in conjunction with screenings of silent films. She also worked as a soloist at the Rialto Theatre; singing music from Puccini's Madama Butterfly and other classical works.

In 1923-1924 she returned to Broadway as Lupina in Jerome Kern's musical Stepping Stones at the Globe Theatre. In 1925 she player Herminie in The Love Song at the Century Theatre; an operetta by Eduard Künneke and Harry B. Smith which fictionalized the life of composer Jacques Offenbach. She was particularly successful on Broadway in two operettas by Sigmund Romberg: as Barbara Frietchie in the Civil War era musical My Maryland (1927), and as the French aristocrat Marianne Beaunoir in The New Moon (1928). She also portrayed the title role in the original production of Romberg's Princess Flavia in 1925-1926.

Herbert remained active on Broadway during the early 1930s portraying the title role in Albert Szirmai's Princess Charming (1930) and the duo roles of Andree De Nemours and Paula DeLaurier in Romberg's Melody (1933). Her final Broadway appearance was in Noël Coward's Bitter Sweet in 1934.

== Other work, personal life, and death ==
Herbert recorded several songs by Romberg on the HMV label. These included two songs from My Maryland, "Mother" and the duet "Silver Moon" (sung with Franklyn Baur), in 1927; two songs from The New Moon, "Lover, Come Back to Me" and "One Kiss", in 1929; and the songs "Prince Charming" and "Love Comes Only Once in a Lifetime" from Princess Charming in 1930. In 1933 she appeared as herself in the film Mr. Broadway which was created as a starring vehicle for Ed Sullivan.

In 1931 Herbert starred in Johann Strauss I's Waltzes in Vienna at the Alhambra Theatre in London. In 1935 she portrayed the title role in the United States premiere of Oscar Straus's operetta Die Teresina at the St. Louis Municipal Opera. In 1935-1936 she and her husband toured the United States in My Maryland; reprising their roles from the Broadway production years earlier. The decline of operetta and the Great Depression’s impact on theatre in the United States led her to retire in the mid 1930s.

Herbert was married to operetta baritone Robert Halliday. They starred together on Broadway in The New Moon and Princess Charming. They also were the leads in the 1935 Universal Pictures short film Desert Harmonies.

Herbert died on 22 February 1975 in California.
