= Out West (1947 film) =

1947 American short film by Edward Bernds

- Theatrical release poster
- Directed by: Edward Bernds
- Written by: Clyde Bruckman
- Produced by: Hugh McCollum
- Starring: Moe Howard; Larry Fine; Shemp Howard; Christine McIntyre; Norman Willis; Jock Mahoney; Stanley Blystone; George Chesebro; Heinie Conklin; Vernon Dent; Frank Ellis; Blackie Whiteford
- Cinematography: George F. Kelley
- Edited by: Paul Borofsky
- Distributed by: Columbia Pictures
- Release date: April 24, 1947 (U.S.)
- Running time: 17:32
- Country: United States
- Language: English

Out West is a 1947 short subject directed by Edward Bernds starring American slapstick comedy team The Three Stooges (Moe Howard, Larry Fine and Shemp Howard). It is the 99th entry in the series released by Columbia Pictures starring the comedians, who released 190 shorts for the studio between 1934 and 1959.

== Plot ==
Shemp finds himself afflicted with a troublesome medical condition caused by a swollen vein in his leg. Following medical advice, he embarks on a therapeutic sojourn to the rugged terrain of the Old West. Upon arrival in a somewhat lawless town, the boys befriend the thuggish Doc Barker. When Shemp mentions to Barker that he has "the biggest vein you ever saw", Barker mistakenly believes he is describing a gold-bearing vein worth millions, and hatches a scheme to seize the gold for himself. Meanwhile, the Stooges are informed by the beautiful Nell that Barker is an outlaw who is holding the Arizona Kid, Nell's paramour, hostage in the basement of the saloon. Upon learning of Barker's villainous identity, the Stooges devise a plan to obtain the prison cell keys from Barker's coat.

While Shemp joins Barker in a game of poker, Moe and Larry concoct a treacherous beverage intended to incapacitate Barker and his associates. To safeguard Shemp, they provide him with a harmless sarsaparilla. Barker downs the concoction, and screams for water. Shemp grabs a nearby fire hose and sprays the entire gang, soaking them. Moe and Larry quickly grab Barker's coat (on the pretext of saving him from pneumonia) and hand the cell keys to Nell, who frees the Arizona Kid. When Barker sees what has happened, he throws Larry in the cell and vows to kill him at sunrise.

With Larry's life hanging in the balance, the Arizona Kid embarks on a mission to summon the United States Cavalry for assistance. Meanwhile, after much reckless work with hammers, Moe and Shemp liberate Larry, and the Stooges triumph by incapacitating Barker and his gang with a stick of dynamite. The Cavalry arrives but is unneeded – and miffed at having "made this nasty trip for nothing". The film ends as Nell and the Arizona Kid are reunited.

== Production notes ==
Out West was filmed July 8–11, 1946, and is the second short to feature Shemp Howard, taking the place of his brother Curly Howard. Like the previous short, Fright Night, Out West was originally written for Curly, but had to be adjusted for Shemp upon his return to the act. The film is also a remake of Pistol Packing Nitwits starring Harry Langdon and El Brendel. It would later be remade in 1954 as Pals and Gals, using ample stock footage.

The congested vein is originally in Shemp's right leg, but he favors his left leg throughout the film.
