= Lester Allen =

American actor (1891–1949)

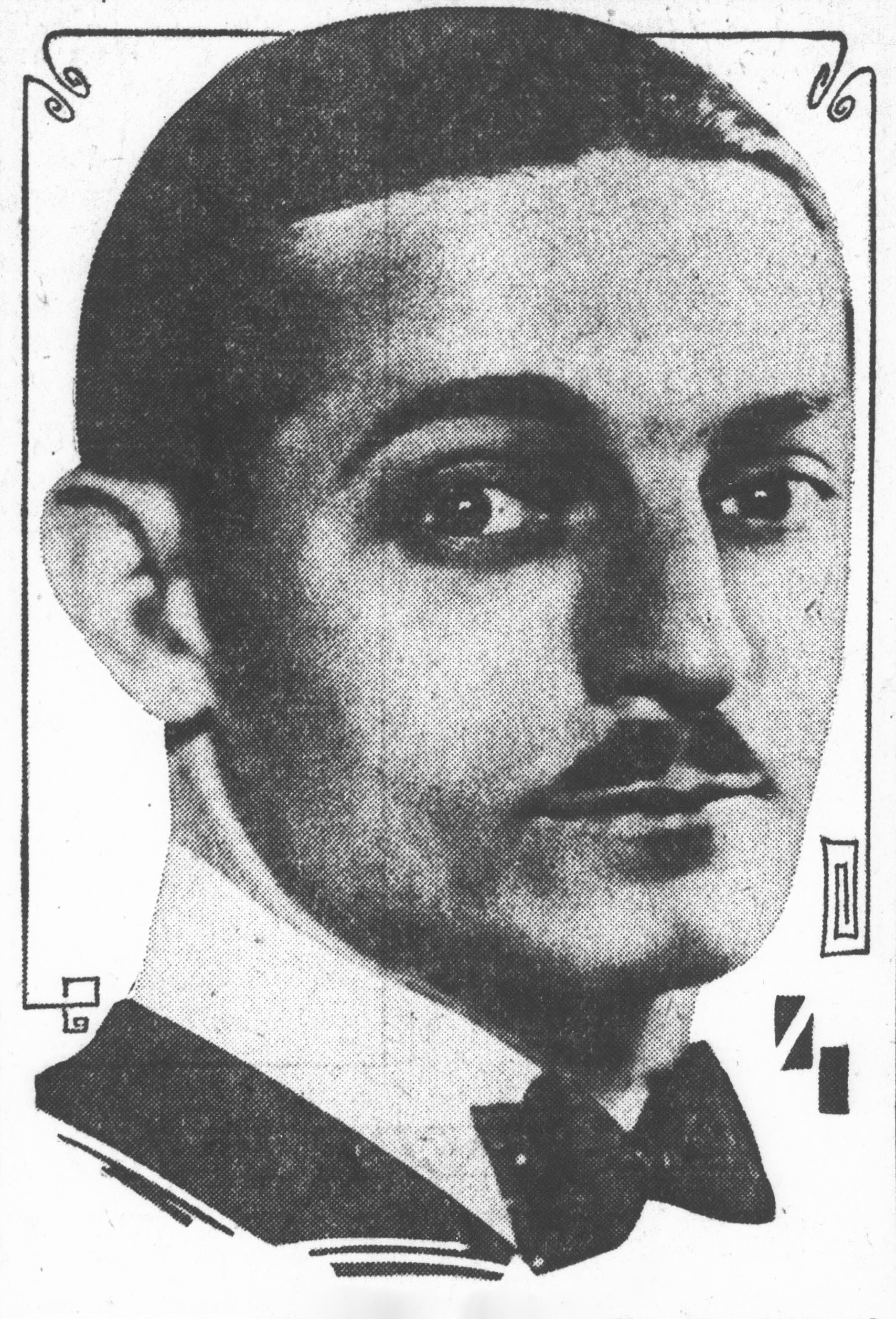
- Born: November 17, 1891; Utica, New York, U.S.
- Died: November 6, 1949 (aged 57); Hollywood, California, U.S.
- Occupation: Actor
- Years active: 1929–1949

Lester M. Allen (November 17, 1891 – November 6, 1949) was an American actor, dancer, singer, comedian, and circus performer. After beginning his career as a child acrobat with the Barnum and Bailey Circus, he became a performer in minstrel shows, burlesque, and vaudeville. He worked as primarily a dancer and acrobat in the Broadway musical revues George White's Scandals and Ziegfeld Follies in the 1910s and early 1920s; ultimately progressing to singing and comedic acting parts. He starred as a comic actor in several musical comedies on Broadway during the 1920s and the early 1930s. He transitioned into work as a film actor, appearing in more than 15 films released from 1941 to 1950. He was killed after being struck by a motor vehicle in 1949.

== Life and career ==
Lester Allen was born on November 17, 1891, in Utica, New York. The son of Russian immigrants Raphael Allen (1855 – October 21, 1923, Chicago) and Ida Bobin (1858– February 1948), his family was Jewish. He began his career in entertainment as a child, running away from home to become a circus acrobat at the age of nine. He was employed by the Barnum and Bailey Circus in the first years of the twentieth century. After leaving the circus, he became a performer in first minstrel shows and then burlesque and vaudeville, working as a dancer, singer, comedian, and actor.

Allen made his Broadway debut as the bridegroom in the 1907 musical Miss Pocahontas at the Lyric Theatre. In 1908 he toured with the vaudeville act Lawrence & Healey, performing the role of 'Jake, the Jew Kid' in their musical sketch "Stage Struck Kid". He returned to Broadway in 1909, portraying Oliver Hartford in Roy McCardell's play The Gay Life at Daly's Theatre. That same year he toured in the vaudeville sketch series Napanese with a cast led by Harry W. Fields. In 1911 he toured in a vaudeville act in which he did a variety of celebrity impersonations. In 1913 he toured the vaudeville circuits as a member of Joe Oppenheimer's Fay Foster Company, appearing in the burlettas "Yankees in Japan" and "Abe". In 1915 he toured with the burlesque organization Million Dollar Dolls.

Allen achieved success on the Broadway stage as a dancer and acrobat in musical revues during the 1910s and early 1920s; including performances in several of the George White's Scandals and in the Ziegfeld Follies. His gift for comedy was mixed with his gift for dancing and acrobatics, most notably in a highly praised comedic take on the apache dance in the 1922 George White's Scandals. Likewise a review in the Boston Sunday Post of the Scandals of 1919 stated about Allen that, "He is quite an acrobat, he can play his features like an artist, and can wring a laugh from the audience which is quite spontaneous. He is unique." He, along with several other performers from the George White's Scandals, were cast in the original production of George Gershwin's one act jazz opera Blue Monday (1922), playing the role of the café worker and custodian Sam in blackface. In the Scandals of 1924 he and actress Winnie Lightner sang a duet which parodied the comedy Abie's Irish Rose.

As he aged, Allen's Broadway career shifted emphasis from dancing and acrobatics towards comedic acting. He starred in several musical comedies on Broadway, including the roles of Sandy in Florida Girl (1925), both Señor Tostado and Mr. Brown in Rufus LeMaire's Affairs (1927), Planchet in The Three Musketeers (1928), Elmer Peters in Top Speed (1929), and Al Darcy in Shady Lady (1933). In Top Speed he sang the show's hit song, "Keep Your Undershirt On", with Ginger Rogers who was making her Broadway debut in this show. On the vaudeville stage during the 1920s and 1930s, he appeared in a double act with Nellie Breen and also emceed at the Palace Theatre. In 1926 he toured in the musical revue Hello Paris with Sophie Tucker as his co-star.

In 1929 Allen starred in his first screen role, portraying the title part in the 1929 short film The Pusher-in-the-Face. In 1930 he starred in the film Leave it to Lester, a work directed by Frank Cambria and named for him. The film co-starred the Broadway torch singer Evelyn Hoey who was later tragically murdered in 1935. After the decline of vaudeville in the 1930s, Allen transitioned into work as a film actor. He appeared in more than 15 films released from 1941 to 1950. One of his notable film roles was the recurring character of Geoduck in the Ma and Pa Kettle film series in which he partnered with actor Chief Yowlachie (as Crowbar) to form a comedic duo of Native Americans. He portrayed Judy Garland's uncle in Vincente Minnelli's 1948 film The Pirate. Garland wore a clown costume in one scene in this film that was previously made for Allen for his performances in the Broadway musical Rufus LeMaire's Affairs.

Allen was killed after being struck by a motor vehicle in North Hollywood on November 6, 1949.

== Filmography ==
| Year | Title | Role | Notes |
|---|---|---|---|
| 1930 | Leave It to Lester | Lester Aloysius Sebastian Brown | |
| 1941 | The Devil Commands | Dr. Van Den | Uncredited |
| 1941 | Underground | Herr Krantz | Uncredited |
| 1943 | The Heat's On | Mouse Beller | |
| 1943 | Klondike Kate | Duster Dan | |
| 1944 | Irish Eyes Are Smiling | Heming | Uncredited |
| 1945 | The Great Flamarion | Tony | |
| 1945 | The Dolly Sisters | Morrie Keno | Uncredited |
| 1946 | The Dark Mirror | George Benson | |
| 1947 | Fun on a Weekend | Hot Dog Vendor | |
| 1948 | The Pirate | Uncle Capucho | |
| 1948 | That Lady in Ermine | Jester | Uncredited |
| 1948 | Crime on Their Hands | Runty | Short |
| 1949 | Ma and Pa Kettle | Geoduck | |
| 1950 | Ma and Pa Kettle Go to Town | Geoduck | Uncredited |
| 1950 | Johnny One-Eye | Designer-Choreographer | |
| 1950 | Love That Brute | Al Allen | Uncredited |
