= Crime on Their Hands =

1948 American short film by Edward Bernds

- Directed by: Edward Bernds
- Written by: Elwood Ullman
- Produced by: Hugh McCollum
- Starring: Moe Howard; Larry Fine; Shemp Howard; Kenneth MacDonald; Christine McIntyre; Charles C. Wilson; Cy Schindell; Ray "Crash" Corrigan; Lester Allen
- Cinematography: Henry Freulich
- Edited by: Henry DeMond
- Distributed by: Columbia Pictures
- Release date: December 9, 1948 (U.S.)
- Running time: 17:44
- Country: United States
- Language: English

Crime on Their Hands is a 1948 short subject directed by Edward Bernds starring American slapstick comedy team The Three Stooges (Moe Howard, Larry Fine and Shemp Howard). It is the 112th entry in the series released by Columbia Pictures starring the comedians, who released 190 shorts for the studio between 1934 and 1959.

== Plot ==
Employed as janitors within a newspaper establishment, the Stooges chance upon a significant journalistic opportunity upon discovering the theft of the priceless Punjab diamond from a local museum, orchestrated by the malevolent antagonist Dapper Malone. Motivated by aspirations of transitioning into authentic reporters, the trio embarks on a quest to locate Dapper, masquerading convincingly as law enforcement officers within Squid McGuffy's cafe.

During their investigative pursuit, the Stooges encounter Dapper's accomplice, Bee, who hastily conceals the stolen gem within a bowl of mints. Unwilling to depart without apprehending Dapper, the Stooges prolong their presence, leading to a misadventure wherein Shemp ingests the diamond alongside confectionery mints. The subsequent revelation of the Stooges' true identities prompts Bee to summon Dapper and his enforcer, Muscles, in a frenzied attempt to extract the gem from Shemp.

Dapper resorts to performing impromptu surgery on Shemp to retrieve the diamond, while Moe and Larry are locked in a closet. They find a toolkit, which allows them to free themselves, but they end up encountering a gorilla named Harold. In the ensuing chaos, Harold incapacitates Dapper and Muscles. The gorilla then unexpectedly befriends Shemp and helps recover the precious diamond.

== Cast ==
=== Credited ===
- Moe Howard as Moe
- Larry Fine as Larry
- Shemp Howard as Shemp
- Kenneth MacDonald as Dapper Malone
- Christine McIntyre as Bea
- George C. Wilson as J. L. Cameron
- Lester Allen as Runty

=== Uncredited ===
- Cy Schindell as Muscles
- Ray "Crash" Corrigan as Harold the gorilla
- Charlie Cross as Drunk
- Budd Fine as Sailor
- George Lloyd as Squid McGuffey
- Jimmy Aubrey as Hawkins
- Heinie Conklin as Bartender
- Blackie Whiteford as Seaman
- Frank O'Connor as Policeman
- Joe Palma as Barfly

== Production notes ==
Crime on Their Hands was filmed on September 9–12, 1947. The title Crime on Their Hands is a parody of the expression "time on their hands." The press room scene was recycled in 1956's Commotion on the Ocean, while the remaining portion of Crime on Their Hands was utilized in 1955's Hot Ice. It is a partial remake of the 1942 Andy Clyde short All Work and No Pay.

Crime on Their Hands marked the final appearance of longtime Stooge supporting actor Cy Schindell. Drafted into the Marines during World War II, Cy Schindell developed a severe case of jungle rot while on Guadalcanal, which eventually developed into terminal cancer. Knowing he was dying, Schindell worked constantly during his illness to assure his family would be financially secure after his death. Excessive makeup was used during the filming of Crime on Their Hands to mask Schindell's cancer-ridden face.
