= Nita Bieber =

American actress and dancer (1926–2019)

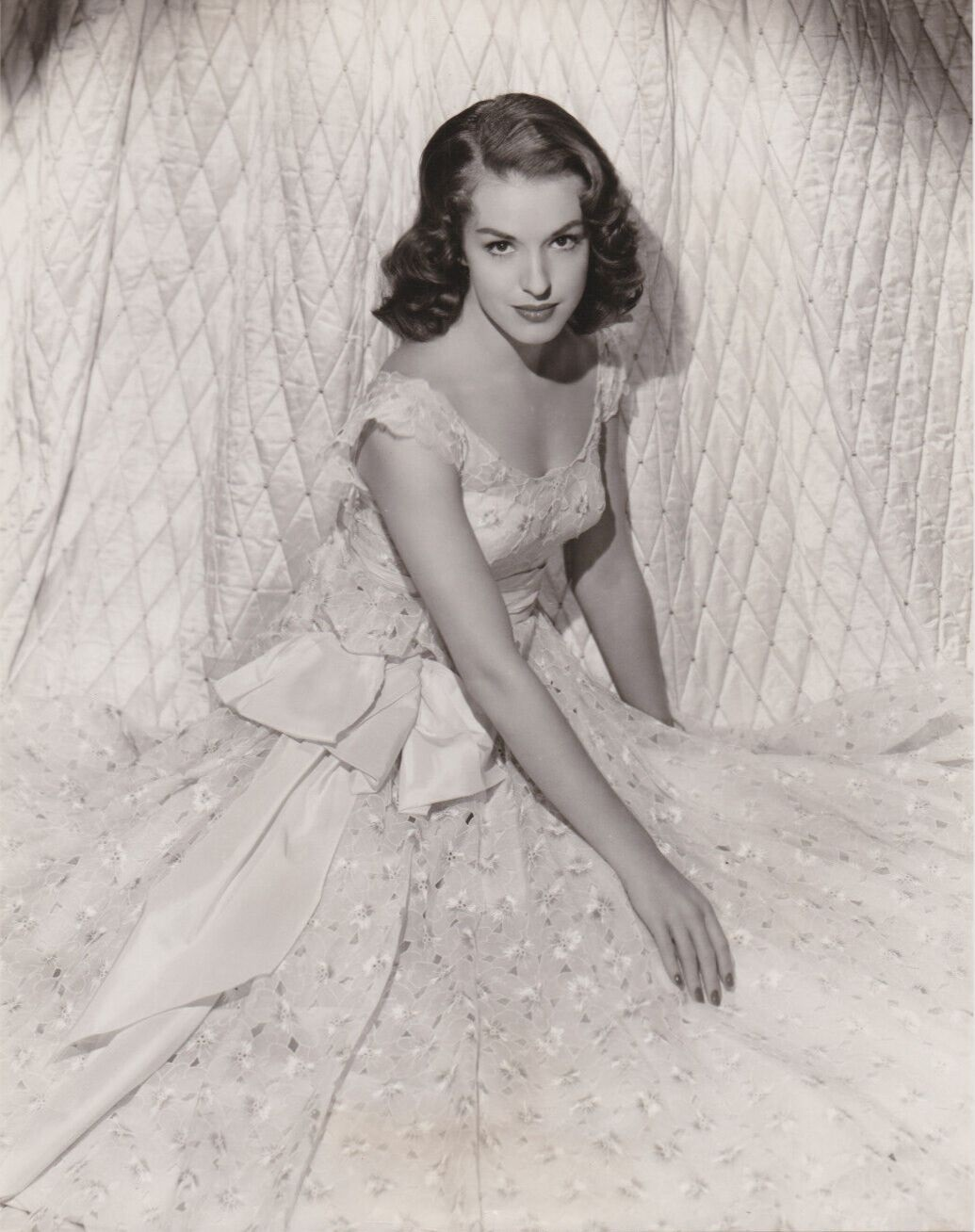
- Bieber in 1950
- Born: Nita Gale Bieber; July 18, 1926; Los Angeles, California, U.S.
- Died: February 4, 2019 (aged 92)
- Occupations: Film, stage actress, dancer
- Years active: 1946–1955
- Spouse: Dr. Jack Wall (1949–2019)
- Children: 2
- Website: http://www.nitabieber.com

Nita Gale Bieber (July 18, 1926 – February 4, 2019) was an American actress and dancer.

== Early years ==
Bieber was born in Los Angeles, California, the daughter of Callie Mae (Robbins) and William Carl Bieber. She was one of five siblings who studied dancing from childhood. After graduating from Hollywood High School, she traveled with a USO troupe.

== Film career ==
In 1946, Bieber appeared in several films for Columbia Pictures, most notably Rhythm and Weep with the Three Stooges. In 1947, she appeared in three more films for Columbia and also appeared in a couple of Monogram flicks, most notably as Mame in the Bowery Boys movie News Hounds. She was featured on the cover of the 28 November 1949 issue of LIFE.

The article described her 7-year contract with MGM and Nita's big dance number in the new movie musical Nancy Goes to Rio; but her dance was not included in the final release (it does, however, appear in the home video DVD version). Bieber appeared in movies for MGM and Universal until 1955. She appeared as the character Sarah Higgins in Summer Stock, starring Judy Garland and Gene Kelly. Bieber also worked with stars such as Tony Curtis (The Prince Who Was a Thief), Hedy Lamarr (A Lady Without Passport), and Larry Fine (Rhythm and Weep). Her final movie before retiring was Kismet (1955) with Howard Keel and Vic Damone.

== The Nita Bieber Dancers ==
Bieber was the creator of her own dance group, The Nita Bieber Dancers, which gave short performances produced in 1951-1952 for local television stations needing "filler" programming, including those for Jerry Gray (1950) and The Colgate Comedy Hour (1954; with Dean Martin and Jerry Lewis). They headlined in Las Vegas (El Rancho Vegas, 1951, with Benny Goodman) and in 1952 were showcased at the Frontier Hotel.

In the early 1950s, Bieber's dancing career was interrupted when she was diagnosed with polio. Doctors told her that her dancing was ended and she might never walk again, but she proved them wrong and returned to performing.

== Personal life ==
Bieber married Dr. Jack Wall, a dentist. They had two children.

== Filmography ==
=== Film ===
Year	Title	Role	Notes
1946	Talk About a Lady	Herself (dancer)	Uncredited
1946	Rhythm and Weep	Wilda	Short
1946	The Jolson Story	Dancer in nightclub revue	Uncredited
1947	The Lone Wolf in Mexico	Cute hotel maid	Uncredited
1947	Millie's Daughter	Model	
1947	Little Miss Broadway	Herself Dancer	
1947	Kilroy Was Here	Waitress	
1947	News Hounds	Mame	
1950	A Lady Without Passport	Cuban Dancer	
1950	Summer Stock	Sarah Higgins	
1950	Jerry Gray and the Band of Today	The Nita Bieber Dancers	Short
1951	The Prince Who Was a Thief	Cahena	
1952	Don Cornell Sings	Herself (dancer)	Short
1955	Kismet	Samaris	Uncredited, (final film role)

=== Television ===
Year	Title	Role	Notes
1954	The Colgate Comedy Hour	The Nita Bieber Dancers	episode #44
1954	The Colgate Comedy Hour	The Nita Bieber Dancers	episode #45
