= Suzanne Ridgeway =

American film actress (1918–1996)

- Ridgeway in 1937
- Born: Suzanne Parsons; January 27, 1918; Los Angeles, California, U.S.
- Died: May 6, 1996 (aged 78); Burbank, California, U.S.
- Years active: 1933-1959

Suzanne Ridgeway (born Suzanne Parsons; January 27, 1918 – May 6, 1996) was an American film actress who appeared in approximately 115 films between 1933 and 1959. She was most often credited as Suzanne Ridgway. Other billings included Suzy Marquette and Susan Ridgway.

== Career ==
Born as Suzanne Parsons, Ridgeway is familiar to modern viewers as the tall, lanky brunette in several Three Stooges short subjects such as Rumpus in the Harem, A Missed Fortune, and A Merry Mix Up. She was also in Outpost in Morocco (1949).

Ridgeway was one of the Bonfire Starlets of 1942, a group of six young actresses chosen by 25 film directors as "the most physically attractive young women to come before their gaze during 1941".

== Death ==
Ridgeway died on May 6, 1996, in Burbank, California.

== Selected filmography ==
- The Steel Lady (1953)
- Around the World in 80 Days (1956)
- From Hell It Came (1957)
