= Barbara Bartay =

Czech-American actress (1921–86)

- Born: Vari Komp; 21 March 1921; Chrochvice, Děčín, Czechoslovakia
- Died: 20 August 1986 (aged 65); Los Angeles, California, U.S.
- Other name: Barbara Bartay
- Occupation: Actress
- Years active: 1951–1957
- Spouse(s): ? Bartay (m. 1947; his death ?); Maytor H. McKinley (m. 1957; div. ?); Samuel McCormac (m. ?)

Vari Komp (19 March 1921 – 20 August 1986), known professionally as Barbara Bartay, was a Czech-born American film actress. She appeared in several short films at Columbia Pictures between 1951 and 1956.

== Career ==
Bartay was born in Chrochvice, Czechoslovakia (now Czech Republic) in 1921 and immigrated to the U.S. in 1948 under a prospective War Bride arrangement. She received U.S. citizenship by 1952.

Bartay is best known for her appearances in several Three Stooges comedies in the 1950s, generally sporting a thick foreign accent similar to that of her native Czech tongue. In addition to her acting career, Bartay was active in the Metropolitan Opera Guild, International Orphans, Inc., National Art Education Association, and the Los Angeles Orphanage Guild.

== Personal ==
Bartay was married three times. Though the first name of her first husband remains unknown, this union gave her the surname of "Bartay." She was married in 1957 to her second husband, Maytor H. McKinley, founder of Utter-McKinley Mortuaries. They remained married until his death. Her third marriage was to Utter-McKinley Mortuaries attorney Samuel McCormac, a union which lasted until her death.

Bartay died of colorectal cancer on 20 August 1986 in Los Angeles, California, at age 65.
