= Felix Adler (screenwriter) =

American comedy film screenwriter (1884–1963)

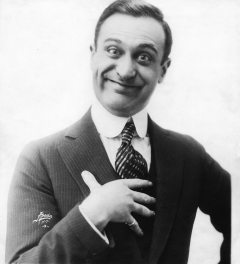
- Born: January 22, 1884; Chicago, Illinois, US
- Died: March 25, 1963 (aged 79); Woodland Hills, California, US
- Resting place: Chapel of the Pines Crematory
- Occupations: Screenwriter; Vaudeville performer
- Years active: 1922–1960
- Spouse: Gertrude Hess(? - 1938)

Felix Adler (January 22, 1884 – March 25, 1963) was an American comedy film screenwriter and vaudeville performer whose career spanned over 30 years. He is best known for his work with the Three Stooges, including their 1934 short Men in Black, which received an Academy Award nomination for "Best Short Subject - Comedy". He had also worked with Will Rogers, Harold Lloyd, Laurel and Hardy, and Abbott and Costello on some of their films.

== Life ==
Adler was born on January 22, 1884, in Chicago, Illinois. He started as a vaudeville actor and then became a title writer for Mack Sennett silents in the early 1920s, easing into talkies with three Harold Lloyd features and as a staff writer for the Columbia Pictures Short Subject department, a position he held until its demise in 1957.

While the vast majority of Adler's writing credits were for Sennett and Three Stooges short subjects, Adler co-wrote six features for Laurel and Hardy and two for Abbott and Costello.

A resident of Hollywood Hills, he was sociable, chatting with neighbors at the Beachwood Village Laundry and giving pocket money to local children. His house became a stop-off for neighbors on their way to and from the Beachwood Market because he would invariably invite them in for a refreshment.

== Death ==
Adler died of abdominal cancer at the Motion Picture & Television Country House and Hospital in Woodland Hills, California, on March 25, 1963. He was 79.

Adler was cremated; his ashes are interred at the Chapel of the Pines Crematory in Los Angeles, with services privately held by his family.

== Filmography ==
- Welcome Danger (1929)
- Feet First (1930)
- Movie Crazy (1932)
- Men in Black (1934)
- Three Little Pigskins (1934)
- Disorder in the Court (1936)
- Our Relations (1936)
- Way Out West (1937)
- Swiss Miss (1938)
- Block-Heads (1938)
- You Nazty Spy! (1940)
- A Chump at Oxford (1940)
- Saps at Sea (1940)
- Here Come the Co-Eds (1945)
- The Naughty Nineties (1945)
- Hold That Lion! (1947)
- Malice in the Palace (1949)
- Oil's Well That Ends Well (1958)

== Notes ==
- As a joke, Adler would sometimes misspell his surname as "Alder" in the credits
- In some Three Stooges shorts, there were many things named after Adler such as a box of soap in Baby Sitters Jitters and a liquor store in Nutty But Nice.
- The last Three Stooges film featuring Adler's writing was Stop, Look and Laugh, a compilation of previously filmed shorts, released in 1960, just three years before he died. The last original Stooge short Adler wrote was 1958's Oil's Well That Ends Well.
- Sometimes Adler would co-write with another writer who had worked with The Three Stooges many times, Clyde Bruckman, like in You Nazty Spy!, which they both co-wrote together.

== Sources ==
- Felix Adler at IMDb
- Men in Black at IMDb
