= Alberto Columbo filmography =

Alberto Colombo (November 27, 1888 – March 24, 1954) was an American composer and music director whose career spanned 20 years, from 1934 through 1953. At the 10th Academy Awards he was nominated for an Oscar in the category of Best Score for the film Portia on Trial.

== Filmography ==
(as per AFI's database)

Year	Title	Credit	Director	Production Co.
1934	Red Morning	Music Director	Wallace W. Fox	RKO Radio Pictures
1934	The Silver Streak	Music Director	Tommy Atkins	RKO Radio Pictures
1935	Annie Oakley	Music Director	George Stevens	RKO Radio Pictures
1935	His Family Tree	Music Director	Charles Vidor	RKO Radio Pictures
1935	The Return of Peter Grimm	Music Director	George Nicholls Jr.	RKO Radio Pictures
1935	Hooray for Love	Music Director	Walter Lang	RKO Radio Pictures
1935	Hot Tip	Music Director	Ray McCarey, James Gleason	RKO Radio Pictures
1935	Village Tale	Music Director	John Cromwell	RKO Radio Pictures
1935	Chasing Yesterday	Music Director	George Nicholls Jr.	RKO Radio Pictures
1935	Seven Keys to Baldpate	Music Director	William Hamilton, Edward Killy	RKO Radio Pictures
1935	A Dog of Flanders	Music Director	Edward Sloman	RKO Radio Pictures
1935	Jalna	Music Director	John Cromwell	RKO Radio Pictures
1935	Powdersmoke Range	Music Director	Wallace W. Fox	RKO Radio Pictures
1935	Freckles	Music Director	Edward Killy, William Hamilton	RKO Radio Pictures
1935	To Beat the Band	Music Director	Benjamin Stoloff	RKO Radio Pictures
1935	Romance in Manhattan	Music Director	Stephen Roberts	RKO Radio Pictures
1936	Two in the Dark	Music Director	Benjamin Stoloff	RKO Radio Pictures
1936	M'Liss	Music Director	George Nicholls Jr.	RKO Radio Pictures
1936	Two in Revolt	Music Director	Glenn Tryon	RKO Radio Pictures
1936	Yellow Dust	Music Director	Wallace W. Fox	RKO Radio Pictures
1936	Love on a Bet	Music Director	Leigh Jason	RKO Radio Pictures
1936	Chatterbox	Music Director	George Nicholls Jr.	RKO Radio Pictures
1936	Grand Jury	Music Director	Albert S. Rogell	RKO Radio Pictures
1936	The Last Outlaw	Music Director	Christy Cabanne	RKO Radio Pictures
1936	Second Wife	Music Director	Edward Killy	RKO Radio Pictures
1936	The Farmer in the Dell	Music Director	Ben Holmes	RKO Radio Pictures
1937	Dangerous Holiday	Music Supervisor	Nicholas Barrows	Republic Pictures
1937	It Could Happen to You	Music Supervisor	Phil Rosen	Republic Pictures
1937	Exiled to Shanghai	Music Director	Nick Grinde	Republic Pictures
1937	Meet the Boyfriend	Music Director	Ralph Staub	Republic Pictures
1937	Portia on Trial	Music Score	George Nicholls Jr.	Republic Pictures
1937	Affairs of Cappy Ricks	Music Supervisor	Ralph Staub	Republic Pictures
1937	The Sheik Steps Out	Music Director	Irving Pichel	Republic Pictures
1937	Springtime in the Rockies	Music Director	Joseph I. Kane	Republic Pictures
1937	Rhythm in the Clouds	Music Supervisor	John H. Auer	Republic Pictures
1937	Wild Horse Rodeo	Music Director	George Sherman	Republic Pictures
1937	Escape by Night	Music Director	Hamilton MacFadden	Republic Pictures
1937	The Duke Comes Back	Music Director	Irving Pichel	Republic Pictures
1937	The Wrong Road	Music Director	James Cruze	Republic Pictures
1937	Youth on Parole	Music Director	Phil Rosen	Republic Pictures
1937	Sea Racketeers	Music Director	Hamilton MacFadden	Republic Pictures
1937	The Hit Parade	Music Director	Gus Meins	Republic Pictures
1937	Michael O'Halloran	Music Supervisor	Karl Brown	Republic Pictures
1937	All Over Town	Music Director	James W. Horne	Republic Pictures
1937	Manhattan Merry-Go-Round	Music Director	Charles F. Reisner, John H. Auer	Republic Pictures
1938	Outside of Paradise	Music Director	John H. Auer	Republic Pictures
1938	Arson Gang Busters	Music Director	Joseph I. Kane	Republic Pictures
1938	Call the Mesquiteers	Music Director	John English	Republic Pictures
1938	Hollywood Stadium Mystery	Music Director	David Howard	Republic Pictures
1938	Call of the Yukon	Music Score	B. Reeves Eason	Republic Pictures
1938	Gold Mine in the Sky	Music Score	Joseph I. Kane	Republic Pictures
1938	Born to be Wild	Music Director	Joseph I. Kane	Republic Pictures
1938	King of the Newsboys	Music Director	Bernard Vorhaus	Republic Pictures
1938	The Old Barn Dance	Music Director	Joseph I. Kane	Republic Pictures
1938	Romance on the Run	Music Director	Gus Meins	Republic Pictures
1938	Ladies in Distress	Music Director	Gus Meins	Republic Pictures
1938	Riders of the Black Hills	Music Director	George Sherman	Republic Pictures
1938	Army Girl	Music Score	George Nicholls Jr.	Republic Pictures
1938	Invisible Enemy	Music Director	John H. Auer	Republic Pictures
1938	Gangs of New York	Music Director	James Cruze	Republic Pictures
1938	Under Western Stars	Music Director	Joseph I. Kane	Republic Pictures
1938	Outlaws of Sonora	Music Director	George Sherman	Republic Pictures
1938	The Purple Vigilantes	Music Director	George Sherman	Republic Pictures
1938	Prison Nurse	Music Director	James Cruze	Republic Pictures
1938	Lady Behave!	Music Director	Lloyd Corrigan	Republic Pictures
1938	Mama Runs Wild	Music Director	Ralph Staub	Republic Pictures
1938	Billy the Kid Returns	Co-composer	Joseph I. Kane	Republic Pictures
1938	Heroes of the Hills	Co-composer	George Sherman	Republic Pictures
1940	Hi-Yo Silver	Music Director	William Witney, John English	Republic Pictures
1941	Federal Fugitives	Music Director	William Beaudine	Producers Releasing Corporation
1941	South of Panama	Music Director	Jean Yarbrough	T. H. Richmond Productions
1942	The Power of God	Music Score	Hamilton MacFadden	Roland Reed Productions
1943	The Fighting Devil Dogs	Music Director	William Witney, John English	Republic Pictures
1945	Youth for the Kingdom	Music Director	Hamilton MacFadden	Lutheran Laymen's League
1947	Messenger of Peace	Music Director	Frank R. Strayer	Lutheran Laymen's League
1948	Reaching from Heaven	Music Director	Frank R. Strayer	Lutheran Church–Missouri Synod
1949	The Sickle or the Cross	Music Director	Frank R. Strayer	Lutheran Laymen's League
1949	The Pilgrimage Play	Music Director	Frank R. Strayer	Roland Reed Productions
1950	Black Hand	Music Score	Richard Thorpe	Metro-Goldwyn-Mayer
1950	The Sundowners	Composer	George "Dink" Templeton	LeMay-Templeton Productions
1951	Inside Straight	Additional music	Gerald Mayer	Metro-Goldwyn-Mayer
1951	All That I Have	Music Score	William F. Claxton	Family Films
1951	Go for Broke!	Music Director	Robert Pirosh	Metro-Goldwyn-Mayer
1951	Talents	Music Director	William F. Claxton	Family Films
1951	Across the Wide Missouri	Composer	William A. Wellman	Metro-Goldwyn-Mayer
1952	Holiday for Sinners	Music Director	Gerald Mayer	Metro-Goldwyn-Mayer
1952	You for Me	Music Director	Don Weis	Metro-Goldwyn-Mayer
1952	It's a Big Country	Music Adaptation	8 sequence directors	Metro-Goldwyn-Mayer
1952	Apache War Smoke	Music Director	Harold F. Kress	Metro-Goldwyn-Mayer
1953	Rogue's March	Music Director	Allan Davis	Metro-Goldwyn-Mayer
1953	Big Leaguer	Music Director	Robert Aldrich	Metro-Goldwyn-Mayer
1953	Code Two	Music Director	Fred M. Wilcox	Metro-Goldwyn-Mayer
1953	Fast Company	Music Director	John Sturges	Metro-Goldwyn-Mayer
1953	A Slight Case of Larceny	Composer	Don Weis	Metro-Goldwyn-Mayer
