= Lutheran Hour Ministries =

- Formation: 1917; 109 years ago
- Purpose: Christian outreach ministry
- Headquarters: St. Louis, Missouri
- Location: United States
- Official language: English
- Formerly called: Lutheran Laymen's League

Lutheran Hour Ministries (LHM) is a Christian outreach ministry affiliated with the Lutheran Church – Missouri Synod (LCMS), the Lutheran Church – Canada, and Lutheran Women in Mission (LWML). Its mission is "Bringing Christ to the Nations—and the Nations to the Church". LHM's flagship radio program, The Lutheran Hour, one of the longest-running Christian radio broadcasts, was at one time the most-syndicated, and the speakers have been some of the most-heard preachers of the 20th century. The supporters of The Lutheran Hour helped its founding organization, the Lutheran Laymen's League (LLL), become a multimillion-dollar Christian missionary foundation.

Today, Lutheran Hour Ministries produces Christian radio and TV programming for broadcast, as well as Internet and print communications, dramas, music, and outreach materials. It has ministry centers in dozens of countries around the world.

== History ==
The Lutheran Laymen's League began in 1917 when 12 laymen organized to pay off debts of the LCMS. It also created a pension fund for church workers.

During the spring of 1917, pastor E. H. Eggers of Immanuel Lutheran Church in Seymour, Indiana, urged Albert Andrew Henry (A.H.) Ahlbrand, a prominent member of the congregation, to write an outline of a business corporation for the synod. Ahlbrand suggested that the synod have one man for a sales manager, with a salesman in every large district or group of smaller districts. These men were to be selected based on their qualifications for this work. They were to contact congregations in their respective territories and report their results each week to the sales manager. They were to encourage the congregations to increase their contributions for the work of the synod. They were also to contact the synodical officials in the districts for their assistance in the effort. If these salesmen were not getting the results desired, the sales manager would have the right to ask them to resign and put another man in his place. Eggers suggested that Ahlbrand submit the plan to the synod.

Since there was a $100,000 debt hanging over the synod, a petition was presented by one of the districts at the 1917 synodical convention that the convention not make any new appropriations until the present indebtedness was removed. With this thought in mind, a number of men, including Ahlbrand, met at the home of Fred Fritzlaff to discuss how to get rid of this debt. A. G. Brauer mentioned that he had endeavored to get 100 people to contribute $1,000 each so as to cover this, had not been successful. After some discussion it was proposed that the members state what they would contribute to pay off the debt. In taking a round table pledge, $26,000 was pledged. Discussion ensued on how to get others to contribute, so that the entire $100,000 could be paid. As a result, the LLL was organized. During these meetings, circuit organizations of laymen was proposed. The entire matter was proposed to the convention and both projects were accepted by a unanimous vote.

Theo. Lamprecht was elected as president and A. G. Brauer as secretary of the LLL. The money was soon raised, and an additional amount of several thousand dollars remained in the treasury of the LLL.

At the Detroit convention of the synod in 1920, Ahlbrand submitted a detailed plan: At the circuit meetings, known as Layman's Conferences, every congregation was to report the money they had contributed to the synod together with a report showing what they contributed for their local congregation and other purposes. These reports were then discussed with a view of encouraging every congregation to do its full part towards contributing to the Lord's Kingdom both at home and abroad. A budget was to be submitted by each congregation based on the communicant membership of such congregation. This plan later became known as the "Ahlbrand Plan".

=== Media projects ===
In 1930, Walter A. Maier secured funding from the LLL for a new radio program titled The Lutheran Hour. The program saw some rocky times during the Great Depression of the 1930s, but persevered to grow listenership and financial support throughout the 20th century. By the end of the 1940s, the income of the LLL had grown to $1.25 million, and The Lutheran Hour was being broadcast on more than 1,000 radio stations worldwide.

Starting in the late 1940s, the LLL and the LCMS worked together to create and distribute a series of Christian drama films directed by Frank Strayer: Messenger of Peace (1947), Reaching from Heaven (1948), The Sickle or the Cross (1949), and Venture of Faith (1951).

In 1952, the LLL began handling the distribution of The Fisher Family, a new Christian drama series for television produced by the LCMS. In 1956, the show evolved into a new format entitled This Is the Life, which continued in production until 1988.

In the 1970s, the LLL produced or worked with the LCMS to produce several animated television shows for Christmas and Easter: Christmas Is (1970), Easter Is (1974), and The City That Forgot About Christmas (1974). In 1987, the LLL worked with Hanna-Barbera to produce The Little Troll Prince, an animated Christmas television special. It has also released other animated holiday specials, including Little Shepherd and Red Boots for Christmas.

The LLL expanded its programs beyond just The Lutheran Hour over the next several decades, and the organization's name was changed in 1992 to Lutheran Hour Ministries due to the popularity of its flagship radio program.

Lutheran Hour Ministries remains a multi-faceted ministry. In addition to The Lutheran Hour, Lutheran Hour Ministries airs the Woman to Woman radio program, has ministry centers in more than 30 nations, offers witnessing training workshops, and has an interactive web site for children called JCPlayZone. In 2008, LHM started a Spanish-language version of The Lutheran Hour called Para el Camino. In 2009, LHM launched its new online men's ministry product, Men's NetWork. In 2010, LHM added more than 350 new stations to its broadcast network through a partnership with Christian Satellite Network. The Lutheran Hour now airs on more than 1,350 stations across North America.
