= Walter A. Maier =

American radio personality and theologian

- Born: October 4, 1893; Boston, Massachusetts, US
- Died: January 11, 1950 (aged 56)
- Education: Boston University (BA); Concordia Seminary (MDiv); Harvard Divinity School (PhD)
- Occupations: Lutheran theologian, Lutheran Hour speaker, professor, author
- Years active: 1917–1950
- Notable work: For Better, Not for Worse: A Manual of Christian Matrimony (1934)
- Title: Speaker of The Lutheran Hour
- Term: 1930–1950
- Successor: Oswald Hoffmann
- Spouse: Hulda Augusta Eickhoff (m. 1924)
- Children: Walter A. Maier II; Paul L. Maier
- Denomination: Lutheran Church – Missouri Synod
- Ordination: May 20, 1917

Walter Arthur Maier (October 4, 1893 – January 11, 1950) was a noted radio personality, public speaker, prolific author, university professor, scholar of ancient Semitic languages and culture, Lutheran theologian and editor. He is best known as the speaker for The Lutheran Hour radio broadcast from 1930 to 1950.

== Early life and education ==
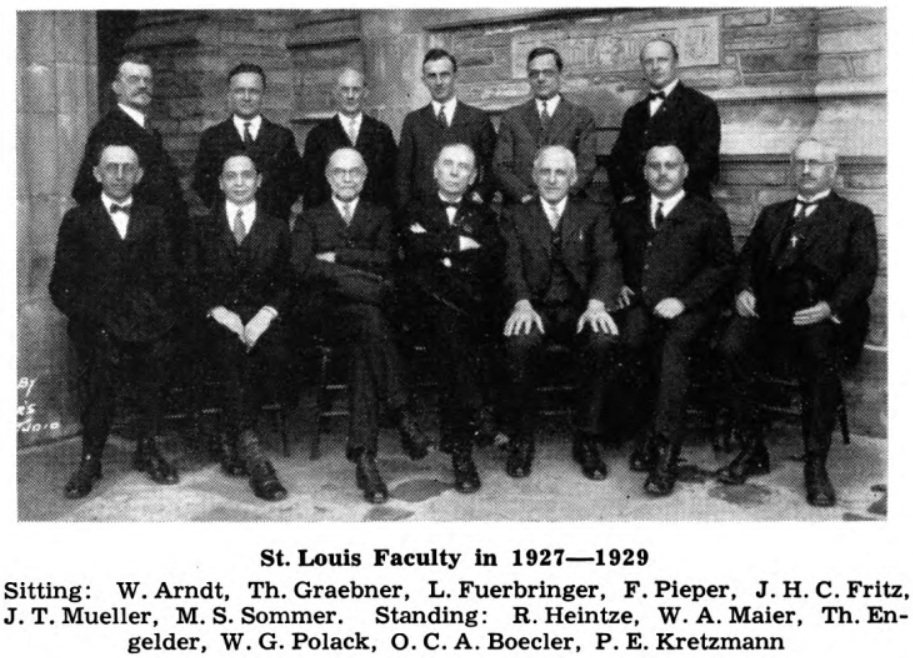
Walter A. Meier is standing in the back row, the second one from the left. This is a picture of the faculty of the St. Louis Seminary in 1927–1929.

Maier was born in Boston, Massachusetts, on October 4, 1893, the fourth of five children to German immigrants Emil William and Anna Katherine "Grossie" Maier. Maier grew up in Boston as an integral part of this large, close-knit, devoutly Christian family, spending his summers at the family farm near Canaan, New Hampshire. Maier planned to enter the ministry from an early age. His family supported his goals by arranging for him to attend the Concordia Collegiate Institute in New York, an academy combining both high school and junior college in the fashion of a European Gymnasium. Here, Maier learned Greek, Latin, and German, along with other background materials suitable for an aspiring Lutheran minister. And here he first developed his love for studies in Hebrew, the language of most of the Christian Old Testament.

After graduating as valedictorian of the Concordia Institute, Maier obtained his B.A. from Boston University in 1913. From there, he went to Concordia Seminary in St. Louis, Missouri, where he supported himself by selling Oliver typewriters. Here, once again, it was the Hebrew language and Old Testament studies that engrossed Maier. Upon graduation in 1916, in recognition of his proficiency in the field, Maier was awarded a graduate fellowship in Old Testament studies at Harvard Divinity School.

Maier studied at Harvard Divinity School from 1916 to 1918, and at Harvard Graduate School of Arts and Sciences from 1918 to 1920. These four years saw the completion of course requirements for both Master of Arts and Doctor of Philosophy degrees, and the creation of a first draft of his doctoral dissertation, Slavery in the Time of the Hammurabi Dynasty. His perspicacity concerning Biblical Hebrew led to the mastery of other Semitic languages such as Arabic, Assyrian, and Babylonian, as well as the Hittite and Sumerian languages; and included the ability to read ancient cuneiform. The study of Semitics also led to his deep understanding of the history, literature, and culture of the ancient societies associated with these languages. In 1917, Harvard Divinity School awarded Maier the Billings Prize for oratory. He received an M.A. in Semitic language, literature and history from Harvard University in 1920; and in 1929 became the twentieth person to ever receive his doctorate from Harvard in Semitics. Since America's oldest college had been founded in 1636, an average of one successful candidate every fifteen years had received this degree.

During these years at Harvard, Maier was ordained into the ministry on May 20, 1917. He served as assistant pastor for the Zion Lutheran Church in Boston from 1917 to 1920. To these duties he added service as a United States Army chaplain from 1918 onward. Much of his work in the chaplain corps was spent working with German prisoners of World War I being held in the Boston area. For his ministry to these captured Germans, Maier was eventually presented with a 1541 Luther Bible, 2nd edition.

== Walther League ==
Upon receipt of his M.A. degree in 1920, Maier was offered a number of university teaching positions that would have facilitated his preparation for the doctorate. Although the opportunity to continue his academic career obviously held great appeal, Maier chose to first answer the call of the church. Founded the year of Maier's birth, the Lutheran young people's organization known as the Walther League was in need of a national director. Among other responsibilities, this office included editorship of the organization's monthly journal, The Walther League Messenger. Forsaking his cherished New England for this position in Milwaukee, Maier was installed as executive secretary on October 7, 1920.

One of the first tasks suggested to Maier by the League's executive board was to discontinue funding of the Wheat Ridge Tuberculosis Sanatorium, an expensive facility maintained largely through League support. The young League executive visited the clinic himself, planning to deliver the bad news in person. But after seeing the need of the patients and the vision of the Wheat Ridge staff, and without consulting his board, Maier ended up pledging the League's support for capital expansion of the hospital. Amazingly, the young people of the Walther League were able to raise more than $200,000 in the following months to keep this promise. Today the sanatorium is no longer needed, but a viable Wheat Ridge Ministries is still about "Lutherans seeding new ministries of health and hope in the name of the healing Christ".

As editor of The Walther League Messenger, Maier also enhanced the publishing arm of the League. He increased the size of the magazine, added features and pictures, wrote stirring editorials, and wrapped it all in a new, more appealing format. Through these improvements and the rapid growth of League membership under Maier's direction, the circulation of the Messenger doubled in a few months.

One of these new readers was a young suburban Indianapolis teacher by the name of Hulda Augusta Eickhoff. Impressed by the solid message and zestful writing style of the articles signed only with the initials “W.A.M.”, Eickhoff decided to join the Walther League. Soon she was elected secretary of the Indianapolis chapter. Her program material had to be approved by “W.A.M.” in Milwaukee, who became as smitten with her writing as she was with his. Eventually the handsome 27-year-old national secretary met the secretary of the Indianapolis chapter; a slender brunette with expressive brown eyes and sparkling smile who was destined to become his bride. Married in 1924, they eventually had two sons: Walter A. Maier II, born in 1925; and Paul L. Maier, born in 1929. Maier continued in his capacity as editor of the Messenger through 1945.

== Concordia Seminary ==
In 1922, Maier became Professor of Old Testament History and Interpretation at Concordia Seminary. At 29 years of age he was the youngest person to hold the rank of full professor in the institution's 83-year history. In order to take the post in St. Louis, Maier resigned as executive secretary of the Walther League, but retained the responsibility of editor for the Messenger. At the seminary Maier was known as "a bear in the classroom, but a prince at home" by the generation of young seminarians to whom he expounded the Hebrew language and Old Testament exegesis. Maier would invite entire classes of students – sometimes over 100 strong – into his home for meals and entertainment.

In 1926, Concordia Seminary moved from southern St. Louis on Jefferson Avenue into a newly constructed facility west of St. Louis in the suburb of Clayton. The Maier family moved into a house built on the Clayton campus, where Maier lived for the rest of his life.

== Entry into radio broadcasting ==
In March 1923, the Messenger featured a W.A.M. editorial entitled “Why not a Lutheran Broadcasting Station?” Meier had long recognized the potential of radio to carry the gospel message to the masses, and dedicated numerous articles, editorials, conferences, and addresses towardd the realization of this goal. Funded by appropriations from the Walther League, the Lutheran Layman's League (LLL), friends, and seminary students, a 500-watt transmitter was purchased and the first Christian radio station was born at Concordia Seminary. The new station, designated KFUO by the Federal Radio Commission, first proclaimed “The Gospel Voice” upon a 545.1 meter wavelength on Sunday, December 14, 1924, at 9:15 p.m. Maier had two weekly programs on the fledgling station, but repeatedly promised, “This is only the beginning!”

Although KFUO was well received and well supported, Maier envisioned a broader audience than could be reached by constructing local radio stations. By 1929, with the goal of spreading the gospel from coast-to-coast, he was investigating the logistics of network broadcasting. At this time, the major radio networks donated air time to the Federal Council of Churches, but no single denomination had ever produced a nationwide radio show dedicated to spreading the gospel. Having persuaded the Missouri Synod of the validity of this project, Maier contacted the National Broadcasting Company early in 1930. He was disappointed to find that NBC would not donate air time to the Lutheran Church, or any other single denomination. Worse still, they would not even allow the Lutheran Church to purchase air time. NBC's policy, Maier was told, precluded putting religious time on a commercial basis.

Maier then approached the Columbia Broadcasting System. CBS accepted paid religious programs but would the charge full commercial rate of $4500 per half-hour to broadcast over its thirty-four city network. An expense of over $200,000 annually seeming too much for the Synod during the depths of the Great Depression, the project was turned over to the Lutheran Layman's League. The LLL had already shown enthusiasm for religious broadcasting, and had great respect for Maier. In the end, the LLL. and Walther League were able to raise commitments of $94,000 by late summer – enough to sign the contract with CBS and commence broadcasting. With Maier as speaker, The Lutheran Hour premiered on Thursday, October 2, 1930, at 10:00 (Eastern) or 7:00 (Pacific); immediately following CBS's hit mystery, The Shadow.

Polling systems for ratings had not yet been invented. The size of a listening audience was estimated by counting each program's fan mail. 15,000 communications were received during the first few weeks of broadcasting. Within a few months, with the listening audience estimated at five million hearers, The Lutheran Hour was receiving more mail than such top secular shows as Amos ‘n’ Andy. The Lutheran Hour was featured in over eight-hundred newspapers nationwide and regularly selected by both the New York Herald Tribune and the New York Post as a recommended program for Thursdays. The program ran for 36 weeks its first season, and received over 57,000 pieces of correspondence. Due to financial concerns, The Lutheran Hour was discontinued from June 1931 through 1934.

== Public speaking ==
Discontinuation of the Lutheran Hour caused Maier to redouble speaking efforts. He still had access to KFUO for local broadcasting as several times he was invited to speak on The Lutheran Hour of Faith and Fellowship, a Detroit-based program that broadcast on a seven-station network in Michigan and Indiana. Additionally, he could reach the public through Messenger editorials and others. He also taught Semitic languages and culture and how to apply this knowledge to a better understanding of Scripture to scores of young seminarians. Maier could also reach vast audiences through public speaking. From the time that he received the coveted Billings prize, he had received praise for his talking style.

In 1917, while attending Harvard, young Maier's addresses in Clinton, Massachusetts, garnered glowing reviews from the local newspaper. By 1920, Executive Secretary Maier was addressing audiences numbering in the thousands. In 1925, he was keynote speaker before an audience of 10,000 for the Lutheran Day Festival at Ocean Grove, New Jersey. On Sunday, June 23, 1929, some 70,000 people attending the quadricentennial celebration of Luther's Small and Large catechisms listened attentively to Meier as the event's featured speaker He continued to speak before audiences numbering in the tens of thousands thereafter.

Soon after the Lutheran Hour went off the air, Maier presented one of his most significant essays, “The Jeffersonian Ideals of Religious Liberty”, before the Institute of Public Affairs at the University of Virginia. For this highly publicized conference on church-state relationships, he shared the rostrum with such notables as President Herbert Hoover and Rear Admiral Richard E. Byrd. Maier's presentation was given a standing ovation, made headlines across the nation the next morning, and was later published.

Later in 1930, Maier was challenged by the Chicago Chapter of the American Association for the Advancement of Atheism to a debate with the renowned atheist Clarence Darrow. The matter reached the newspapers, igniting strong sentiments from both atheists and Christians. Darrow issued a statement to the Associated Press: “I never issued any challenge of this nature and no one has been authorized to issue such a challenge on my behalf.” Despite further entreaty from the challenging institution, Darrow declined to enter the fray, much to the Maier's disappointment.

During this period, Maier accepted speaking engagements nearly every weekend. Time magazine featured articles on his “Seven Fatal Follies” and “Back to Luther!” addresses at Ocean Grove (July 27, 1931, and Sept. 4, 1933, respectively). In the fall of 1932, he and Michigan governor Wilber M. Brucker addressed 11,000 at the Motor City's State Fair Coliseum to honor the bicentennial of George Washington’s birth. Maier spoke before 16,000 at Olympia Stadium in Detroit in 1933 and over 25,000 at Belle Isle in 1934. When the Lutheran Hour resumed in 1935, Maier continued to speak before capacity crowds, deeming the message more important than his own well-being.

Maier became a chief spokesman for the vigorous reassertion of classic Christianity. A superb orator, with the educational background to support his positions, Maier possessed the ability to communicate traditional Christianity in an untraditional manner, (as one magazine writer quipped, “the soapbox delivery of a Harvard script”). His version of traditional Christianity was pure Protestant orthodoxy based on Scripture and mediated through the Lutheran confessional traditions. In 1948, when Eleanor Roosevelt labeled him as a "fanatic fundamentalist," he replied with a sermon entitled, "You, Too, Should be a Fundamentalist!" (Roosevelt later retracted her charge and apologized to Maier)

== The Lutheran Hour ==
From the time that The Lutheran Hour went off the national air in 1931, Maier never stopped working for its return. To avoid the prohibitive costs associated with the first network season, Maier and the radio committee of The Detroit Lutheran Pastoral Conference decided to recommence operations on the newly formed Mutual Broadcasting System. Although the reinstituted Lutheran Hour would broadcast on only eight stations, it included heavyweight WLW of Cincinnati. Broadcasting at 500,000 watts, or ten times the maximum output allowed by the Federal Communications Commission (FCC) today, WLW could be heard anywhere east of the Rocky Mountains. Commencing on Sunday, February 10, 1935, the Lutheran Hour proclaimed its second season from Epiphany Lutheran Church in Detroit. Brace Beemer, the voice of WLW's original Lone Ranger, was the announcer and Maier returned as speaker. Over a thousand letters from 16 states and Canada were received after the first broadcast, providing some gauge of the program's reach. During the season, KFUO; WTJS, Jackson, Tennessee; and KLCN, Blytheville, Arkansas, joined the stations covering the program. By the end of the fourteen broadcasts, over 16,000 letters had arrived from 35 states and several provinces of Canada.

From its third season onward, the Lutheran Hour originated from KFUO on the Concordia Seminary campus, a welcome relief from the 450-mile (720 km) weekly commute to Detroit endured by Maier during the second season. By the fourth season, the Lutheran Hour was reaching west of the Rockies again with the addition of nine stations of California's Don Lee Network and KFEL in Denver. The total number of outlets was now 31, almost as many as the original network contract provided for in 1930. This series received over 90,000 pieces of correspondence from every state of the Union as well as provinces of Canada and Mexico. The fifth season (1937–38) broadcast over 62 stations; the sixth (1938–39), 66; and with the advent of electronic transcription, the seventh Lutheran Hour (1939–40) was aired on 171 radio stations. The Spanish Lutheran Hour was also added in 1939, originating with short-wave radio station HCJB (“The Voice of the Andes”) in Quito, Ecuador. Soon stations were added in Puerto Rico, Panama, Columbia, Venezuela, Bolivia, and the Philippines.

=== Freedom of speech ===
In 1938, the Federal Council of Churches petitioned the National Association of Broadcasters and the Federal Communications Commission formally requesting that all paid religious programs be barred from the air. The major radio networks at this time donated time to the three major divisions of organized religion in the United States: Protestant, Roman Catholic, and Judaism. Protestant programming had been placed under exclusive direction of the council, an organization which represented about thirty denominations but less than half of American Protestantism. Overtly liberal in its theology, the Federal Council would not sponsor a conservative, Christ-centered program such as the Lutheran Hour. Jealous of its privilege, the council's general secretary was on record as having said in 1929, “in the future, no denomination or individual church will be able to secure any time whatever on the air unless they are willing to pay prohibitively high prices....”

Having overcome the disadvantage of providing its own financing, the Lutheran Hour was now the largest religious broadcast in radio. But the Federal Council sought to end all such endeavors, allowing no viewpoint except its own. Championing the cause of religious freedom and freedom of speech, Maier was a strong voice against such “totalitarian tendencies”. As portrayed in a 1938 article by Time magazine, Maier's pulpit helped to preserve the heritage of liberty enjoyed by citizens of the United States.

=== Continued growth ===
By its eighth season (1940–41) 52 foreign stations brought the Lutheran Hour’s total to 310. That year the program received 200,000 communications, including as many as 5,000 items in a single day. The 1941–42 Lutheran Hour saw the entry of the United States into World War II. The same year the Icelandic government granted the Lutheran Hour use of 100,000-watt Radio Reykjavic for programs in English and Icelandic. For the first time, the Lutheran Hour could be heard in Europe. A mail count of 260,000 corroborated other means of audience measurement in creating an estimate of 10,000,000 listeners worldwide.

The tenth season (1942–43) was the first to run for 52 weeks. The eleventh season (1943–44) was carried on 540 stations; the twelfth (1943–44) on 609; and the thirteenth (1944–45) on 809 stations. During the twelfth season the Mutual Broadcasting System enacted a new policy that prohibited solicitation of funds on the broadcast. Up to this time, contributions from radio listeners had supported about 75% of program costs, with Lutheran agencies and friends of the ministry providing the rest. Despite a cost which had risen to $29,000 per program, or $1,500,000 per season, listeners continued to support the majority of the broadcast without being asked.

These trends continued into Maier’s last year as speaker. In 1949, ABC announced that they had decided to accept paid religious broadcasting. With this addition, the Lutheran Hour was now heard on 1,236 stations worldwide. ABC and CBS also offered television facilities for the program. Several such telecasts were produced beginning with a local show over St. Louis’ KSD-TV on New Year's Day, 1948. By end of year, 1949, the Lutheran Hour was broadcast from 55 countries to a potential listening audience of 450,000,000 in 120 different lands. Programming was translated into 36 languages, and plans were in motion to raise that tally to 50. An agreement had been reached to add a 111-station Japanese Lutheran Hour to ongoing broadcasts in Spanish, Afrikaans, German, Chinese, Arabic, Slovak, Italian, Greek, Estonian, Latvian, Hungarian, Bulgarian, Polish, Russian, and others. The broadcast could be heard in Australia, Latin America, throughout Africa, the Far East including much of Communist China, the South Pacific Islands and the West Indies, and all of Europe, including Soviet Eastern Europe and some of Asiatic Russia. The estimated weekly listening audience rose from 12,000,000 (Time, 1943), to 15,000,000 (Collier's, 1944), to 20,000,000 people (Saturday Evening Post, 1948). Mail count continued to exceed the rate that had produced 450,000 items in the previous season, culminating in a record of 17,000 letters received in one day. All of this indicated success for Maier's vision of “Bringing Christ to the Nations".

== Writing career ==
Maier was editor of the Walther League Messenger for 25 years, from 1920 to 1945. Once a month the magazine addressed timely issues, secular and religious, within an illustrated format which averaged 64 pages in length. Each issue included at least three editorials and articles authored by “W.A.M.” In over 900 essays W.A.M. explored subjects including archaeology, literature and education, music and the fine arts, science and medicine, society and entertainment, and business and labor. His object was to provide thinking church people with spiritual insights into current topics, a perspective not addressed in secular periodicals. During the quarter century under Maier as editor, Messenger circulation grew from 7,000 to 80,000, indicating that his target audience appreciated this approach.

When the national Lutheran Hour went off the air in 1931, many listeners wrote to express interest in continuing its message. Its speaker's first book, The Lutheran Hour, was a collection of broadcast sermons from that first season intended to alleviate these concerns until a second season could be developed. When the Lutheran Hour broadcast resumed in 1935, the radio public continued to request sermons in printed form. This led to 20 volumes of his sermons during his years as speaker. When Maier prepared a radio sermon, he dealt with each subject exhaustively. The transcripts of his message typed in pica were typically 22 to 24 pages long, with far more detail than he could include in a 20-minute delivery. The complete messages were included in the published collections, which meant that a reader would get fresh information, even on a subject that he had already heard on the radio. The books averaged 350–400 pages each and served as resource materials for many Protestant ministers. The following excerpts are illustrative of the national reviews:

…sober, sensible, and fervent talks on religion…that have moved many people to serious thinking…–Boston Globe, January 23, 1932

…a clarity unusual in this day of foggy verbiage. – Dallas Times-Herald, January 24, 1932

…earnest, evangelical, and absolutely sound…–The Christian Century, XLIX, 258

In 1934, Maier published For Better, Not for Worse: A Manual of Christian Matrimony. He honestly believed that no one was more happily married than he, and the intentions of many supposed experts to redefine the institution troubled him. Maier hoped that such a book, based upon a thorough study of the problem, would enable others to also obtain wedded bliss as a reality in their lives. ‘Thorough’ being the keyword, For Better, Not for Worse, included 504 pages of small type in its first edition. The book sold out five printings more quickly than expected, and each time the noted professor added detail and clarification. By the sixth printing, the matrimonial tome had reached 598 pages in length. The consensus of newspaper and magazine reviews was overwhelmingly favorable, although the work was regarded as academic and “ponderous” by some. Time devoted half of a 1935 article towards its review, and the following excerpt from Christianity Today is indicative of the overall response:

This volume is a needed protest against the pagan, despiritualized conceptions of courtship, marriage and family relations that find such wide-spread expression today….It is more than a protest, however. It sets forth the constructive contributions which Christianity makes to married happiness.

In 1931, Maier wrote the essay, “The Jeffersonian Ideals of Religious Liberty”, which was later published by Concordia Publishing House. During World War II Maier wrote the well-known Wartime Prayer Guide. The 66 page booklet measured less than 3 by 5 inches (76 mm × 127 mm), and was designed to fit in the uniform pockets of those in service. Several hundred thousand of these were printed by Concordia and distributed to those engaged in the war. Ernst Kaufmann Publishers of New York approached the eminent professor in 1940 to author the text of a new format of home devotional literature. The work consisted of calendar leaflets for each day of the year with a Scripture text, and a 200-word devotional printed on one side and a prayer and hymn verse on the other. Maier produced twelve years of this series, entitled Day by Day; with sales eventually rising to 50,000 annually. Phonograph record albums entitled Day by Day were also produced, with Maier meditations and hymns by the Lutheran Hour Chorus. The Lutheran Hour offered a tuition-free Correspondence Course entitled, “The Fundamentals of the Christian Faith”. The materials for this study series were also written by Maier – 30 lessons (with test sheets). In addition, Maier published five paperback Lenten devotionals from 1945 to 1949.

Culminating Maier's literary career was the long-researched The Book of Nahum. Published posthumously in 1959 from a manuscript whose text was completed before Maier's death, The Book of Nahum was a return to Maier's first love, Semitics. For many years, Maier had worked on this project in his leisure time, often stating his intention to fill his later years with such academic pursuits once he retired from the limelight. This last work was an examination of the Biblical book of Nahum from the scholar's perspective. Maier's main interest lay in the fact that Nahum predicted the fall of the Assyrian empire at around 650 BC, some forty years before the event actually occurred. Many modern higher-critical studies have assumed that Nahum must have been written after the fall of Nineveh in 612 BC, based upon the preconceived bias that prophecy is impossible or unscientific. Maier's work demonstrated that such predictions were in fact given many years in advance of the fulfillment. His work highlights 22 separate details in Nahum's prophecies that were literally fulfilled in the fall of Nineveh. George V. Schick finished the bibliography and edited the manuscript for publication.

== Death and legacy ==
Maier “returned to his Creator for entry into life everlasting” at 12:25 a.m. on January 11, 1950. He left behind a bereaved widow and two sons. At the time of his death, The Lutheran Hour had become the largest regular broadcast – secular or religious – in the history of radio. His books and transcriptions of those sermons are available online today.

Maier was one of the pioneers of international broadcasting. Men such as Billy Graham credit Maier's work as inspirational for their own ministries. Maier fought for religious freedom and for the fairness of Jeffersonian policies toward church-state relations.

== Publications ==
- Slavery in the Time of the Hammurabi Dynasty, Harvard University, [1929]
- For Better Not for Worse: A Manual of Christian Matrimony, Concordia Pub. House, [1935] (free online)
- Beautiful Savior: Forty Lenten Meditations, Concordia, [1935]
- Christ for Every Crisis! : the Radio Messages Broadcast in the Second Lutheran Hour, Kessinger Publishing, [2007] ISBN 1-4325-5574-X
- Christ for the Nation!: The Radio Messages Broadcast in the Third Lutheran Hour, Concordia publishing house, [1936]
- Peace Through Christ: Radio Messages Broadcast in the Seventh Lutheran Hour, Kessinger Pub LLC, [2007] ISBN 1-4325-0406-1
- Victory Through Christ: Radio Messages Broadcast In The Tenth Lutheran Hour, Concordia Pub. House, [1943]
- America, Turn to Christ!: Radio Messages of the Lutheran Hour from Easter Through Christmastide, 1943, Concordia Pub. House, [1944]
- Christ, Set the World Aright!: Radio Messages of the Eleventh Lutheran Hour from New Year to the Pentecost Season, Concordia Publishing House, [1945]
- Rebuilding with Christ, Concordia Pub. House, [1946]F
- My Suffering Redeemer, The Lutheran Laymen's League, [1946]
- Let Us Return Unto the Lord: Radio Messages of the First Part of the Thirteenth Lutheran Hour, Published by Concordia Pub. House, [1947]
- Christ Crucified, Lutheran Laymen's League, [1947]
- He Will Abundantly Pardon: Radio Messages of the Second Part of the Thirteenth Lutheran Hour, Kessinger Publishing, [2007] ISBN 1-4304-8473-X
- The airwaves proclaim Christ; radio messages of the first part of the fourteenth Lutheran hour, Concordia Pub. House, [1948]
- Plato's Conception of His Supreme Deity, Washington Univ., [1949]
- One Thousand Radio Voices for Christ: Radio Messages for the First Part of the Fifteenth Lutheran Hour, Concordia Pub. House, [1950]
- Go Quickly and Tell; : Radio Messages for the Second Part of the Fifteenth Lutheran Hour, Concordia pub. House, [1950]
- The Book of Nahum, Concordia Publishing House, [1959]
