= Paul L. Maier =

American historian, writer and academic (1930–2025)

- Born: May 31, 1930
- Died: February 27, 2025 (aged 94); Kalamazoo, Michigan, U.S.
- Education: Harvard University (MA); Concordia Seminary (MDiv); Heidelberg University
- Occupations: Historian; novelist
- Spouse: Joan
- Children: 4
- Relatives: Walter A. Maier (father)
- Writing career
- Genres: Historical fiction; non-fiction

Paul L. Maier (May 31, 1930 – February 27, 2025) was an American historian and novelist. He wrote several works of scholarly and popular non-fiction about Christianity and novels about Christian historians. He was the Russell H. Seibert Professor of Ancient History at Western Michigan University, from which he retired in 2011, retaining the title of professor emeritus in the Department of History. He previously served as Third Vice President of the Lutheran Church–Missouri Synod.

== Early life and education ==
Maier was born on May 31, 1930, as the son of Walter A. Maier (1893–1950), founder and long time speaker of The Lutheran Hour. He was a graduate of Harvard University (M.A., 1954) and Concordia Seminary, St. Louis (M. Div., 1955). On a Fulbright Scholarship, Maier studied at the University of Heidelberg, Germany, and Basel, Switzerland. At Basel, Maier studied under scholars Karl Barth and Oscar Cullmann. He received his Ph.D., summa cum laude, in 1957.

== Career ==
Maier was the author of sixteen published books, both historical fiction and non-fiction. His historical fiction includes the #1 national best-seller in religious fiction A Skeleton in God's Closet (1993), as well as Pontius Pilate (1968), The Flames of Rome (1981), More Than A Skeleton (2003), and the children's book The Very First Christmas (1998). Maier's non-fiction work includes Josephus: The Essential Works, a translation and abridgement of the writings of Josephus; and The Ecclesiastical History of Eusebius of Caesarea, a translation of Eusebius' Church History. Maier co-wrote The Da Vinci Code: Fact or Fiction? with Christian apologist Hank Hanegraaf. The book is a critical rebuttal of Dan Brown's 2003 topseller The Da Vinci Code. In addition, he has published well over 200 articles and reviews in such journals as Archiv für Reformationsgeschichte, Church History, Harvard Theological Review, Hermes: Zeitschrift für Klassische Philologie, Concordia Theological Quarterly, Concordia Journal, Mankind, Christian Century, Christianity Today, and Christian Herald.

He traveled and lectured frequently. In 2004, he was featured on the Christian daily talk show 100 Huntley Street in Canada for the entire year. He was a frequent guest on the show.

== Personal life and death ==
Maier was married to Joan and had four daughters. He was a member of the Lutheran Church-Missouri Synod. Maier died in Kalamazoo, Michigan, on February 27, 2025, at the age of 94.

== Appearances ==
Maier appeared in the documentary film "Who Is This Jesus" produced by D. James Kennedy's Coral Ridge Ministries in 2000, largely in response to an ABC News documentary "The Search for Jesus", which featured a number of skeptical scholars, including members of the Jesus Seminar. Maier appeared in a 2004 episode of the Showtime TV show, Bullshit!, entitled The Bible: Fact or Fiction?. The show's hosts argued against a literal interpretation of the Bible. Maier was invited to provide both a counterargument and relevant background information regarding the text. He was opposed by Skeptics Society founder Michael Shermer. Maier also appeared on the TV series Mysteries of the Bible, in the episode titled "Paul The Apostle."

== List of published works ==
=== Books for adults ===
- A man spoke, a world listened: the story of Walter A. Maier [1963]
- Pontius Pilate [1968] ISBN 0-8254-3296-0 (Paperback), ISBN 0-8254-3261-8 (Hardcover)
- First Christmas: The True and Unfamiliar Story in Words and Pictures [Harper & Row, 1971] ISBN 0-06-065396-5 (Hardcover)
- First Easter: The True and Unfamiliar Story in Words and Pictures [Harper & Row, 1973] ISBN 0-06-065397-3 (Hardcover)
- First Christians: Pentecost and the Spread of Christianity [Harper & Row, 1976] ISBN 0-06-065399-X
- The Flames of Rome [1981] ISBN 0-8254-3297-9 (Paperback), ISBN 0-8254-3262-6 (Hardcover)
- Josephus, the Essential Writings: A Condensation of Jewish Antiquities and the Jewish War [1988] ISBN 0-8254-2963-3
- In the Fullness of Time: A Historian looks at Christmas, Easter and the Early Church [1991] ISBN 0-8254-3329-0
- A Skeleton in God's Closet [1994] ISBN 0-8407-7721-3
- Eusebius - The Church History: A new translation with commentary [1999], ISBN 0-8254-3328-2
- More Than A Skeleton: It was one man against the world [2003] ISBN 0-7852-6238-5
- The Da Vinci Code: Fact or Fiction? (co-written with Hank Hanegraaf) [2006] ISBN 1-4143-1035-8
- A Skeleton in Rome [2011]
- The Constantine Codex [2011] ISBN 1-4143-3773-6

=== Books for children ===
- The Very First Christmas [1998] ISBN 0-570-05064-2
- The Very First Easter [1999] ISBN 0-570-07053-8
- The Very First Christians [2001] ISBN 0-570-07175-5
- Martin Luther: A Man Who Changed the World [2004] ISBN 0-7586-0626-5
- The Real Story of the Creation (illustrated by Robert T. Barrett) [2007] ISBN 0-7586-1265-6
- The Real Story of the Flood (illustrated by Robert T. Barrett) [2008] ISBN 0-7586-1267-2
- The Real Story of the Exodus (illustrated by Gerad Taylor) [2009] ISBN 9780758612687

=== List of DVDs ===
- Christianity: The First Three Centuries [2003]
- The Odyssey of St. Paul [2003]
- Jesus: Legend or Lord? [2003]
- How We Got the Bible [2009]
- Christianity and the Competition [2010]
- The Week that Changed the World [2011]
