= Walter Strenge =

American cinematographer (1898–1974)

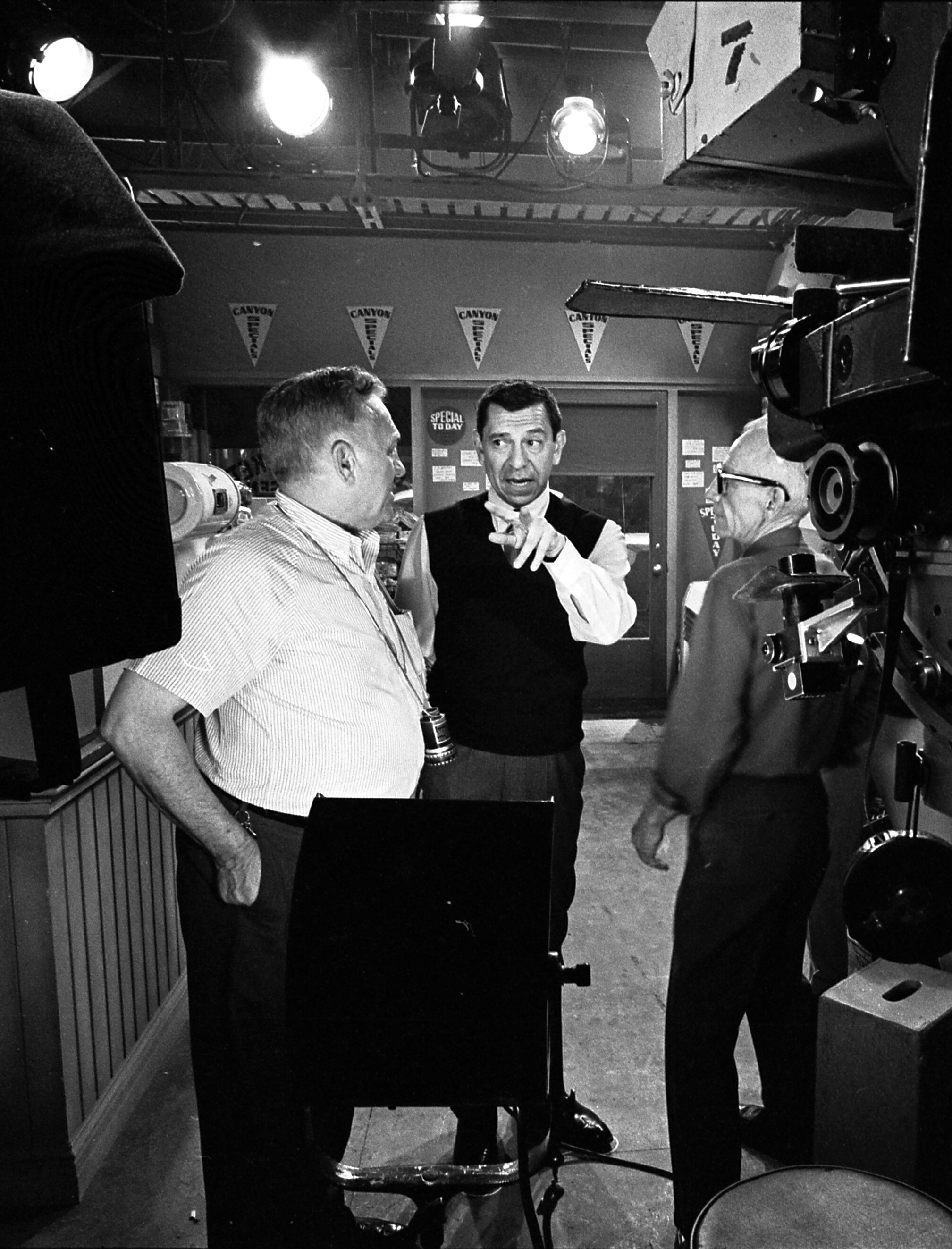
- Strenge (left) on the set of Dragnet 1966 with star Jack Webb
- Born: May 2, 1898; Albany, New York, United States
- Died: September 2, 1974 (aged 76); Los Angeles, California; United States
- Other name: Frederic Walter Strenge
- Occupation: Cinematographer
- Years active: 1929–1974

Walter Strenge (May 2, 1898 – September 2, 1974) was an American cinematographer. In 1958, he was elected president of the American Society of Cinematographers.

== Selected filmography ==
- The Talk of Hollywood (1929)
- Mother's Boy (1929)
- The Exile (1931)
- Messenger of Peace (1947)
- Lighthouse (1947)
- Appointment with Murder (1948)
- Reaching from Heaven (1948)
- The Sickle or the Cross (1949)
- The Pilgrimage Play (1949)
- Million Dollar Pursuit (1951)
- Secrets of Monte Carlo (1951)
- Venture of Faith (1951)
- Stagecoach to Fury (1956)
- The Power of the Resurrection (1958)

Had a screen credit on The Munsters.

== Bibliography ==
- Len D. Martin. The Republic Pictures Checklist: Features, Serials, Cartoons, Short Subjects and Training Films of Republic Pictures Corporation, 1935-1959. McFarland, 1998.
