= Robert T. Barrett =

American painter, illustrator, and professor of illustration

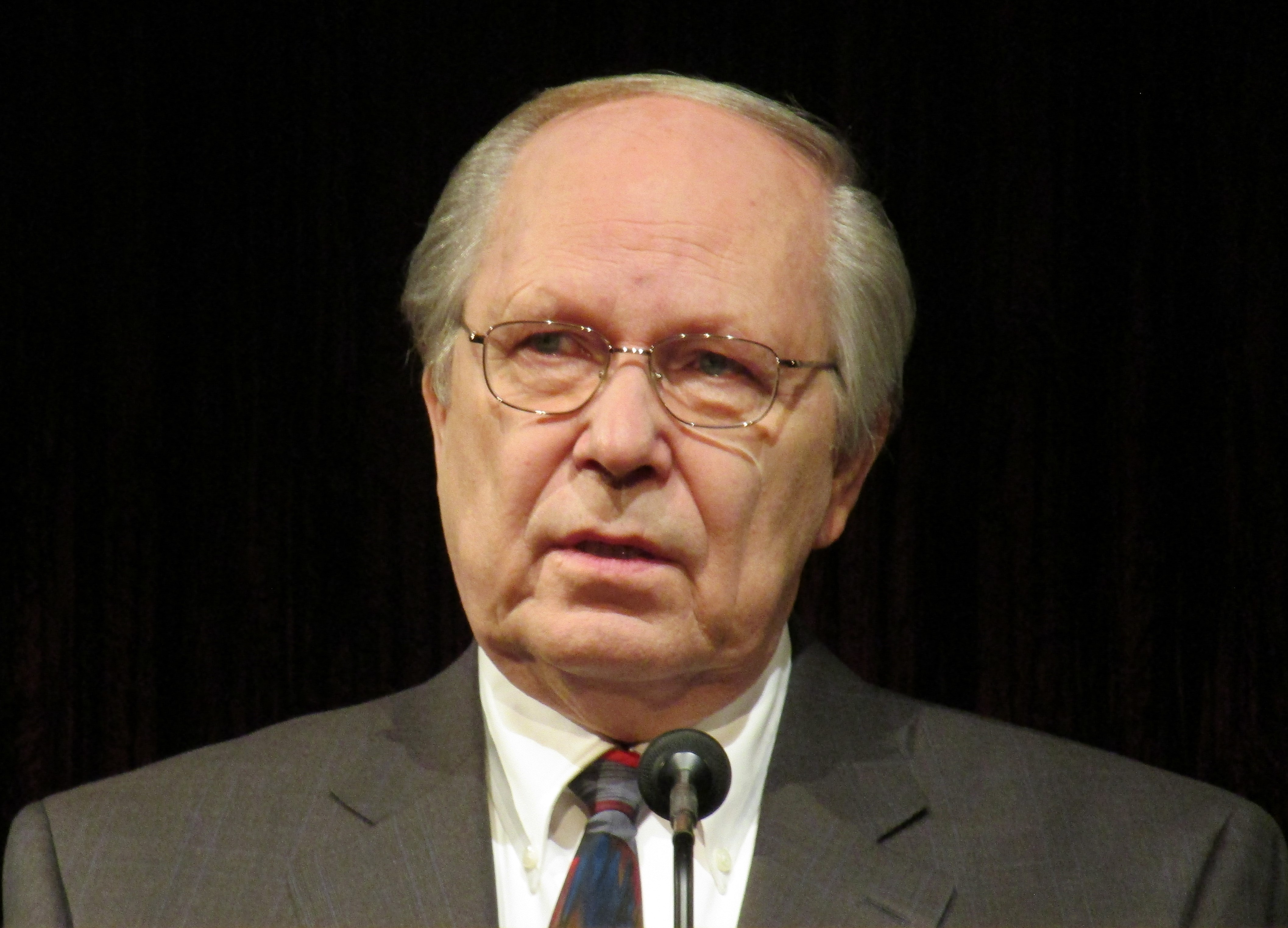
- Robert T. Barrett in 2018
- Born: Robert Theodore Barrett; May 13, 1949 (age 77)
- Education: University of Utah; University of Iowa; Berlin University of the Arts
- Occupations: Painter, illustrator, and professor

Robert Theodore Barrett (born May 13, 1949) is an American painter, illustrator, and professor of illustration at Brigham Young University. His illustrated works include The Story of the Walnut Tree, Silent Night, Holy Night: The Story of the Christmas Truce, and The Nauvoo Temple Stone. He illustrated a book about President Barack Obama, entitled Obama: Only in America (2010), written by Carole Boston Weatherford.

== Career ==
Barrett holds a BFA degree from the University of Utah, and an MA and MFA degree from the University of Iowa. Barrett studied painting in Europe as the recipient of a German Academic Exchange Grant to study at the Berlin University of the Arts, and was an artist-in-residence at the Kimball Art Center as the recipient of a joint grant from The National Endowment for the Arts and the Utah Arts Council. Besides being a professor, he has also served as associate dean of the BYU College of Fine Arts and Communications. Barrett also co-authored a BYU Studies article on the lives and art works of Arnold Friberg, Harry Anderson, Tom Lovell, and Ken Riley with Susan Easton Black. He is a member of the Society of Illustrators and was awarded the 2010 Distinguished Educator in the Arts Award.

Barrett has presented one-man art shows, notably at the Springville Art Museum and the St. George Art Museum, among other sites. He has made many drawings, some of which are based on accounts from the Book of Mormon, and paintings of events in the ministry of Jesus Christ as recorded in the New Testament. He also illustrated The Real Story of Creation and The Real Story of the Flood, written by Paul L. Maier, a Lutheran pastor and a professor at Western Michigan University.

== Personal life ==
Barrett is a member of the Church of Jesus Christ of Latter-day Saints, and served a Mormon mission to Germany. Barrett and his wife Vicki are the parents of ten children.

== Selected books ==
- The Story of the Walnut Tree (2000)
- The Nauvoo Temple Stone (2002)
- Silent Night, Holy Night: The Story of the Christmas Truce (2003)
- The Real Story of the Creation (2007)
- The Real Story of the Flood (2008)
- Obama: Only in America (2010)
- Michelle Obama: First Lady (2010)
- Christmas from Heaven: The True Story of the Berlin Candy Bomber (2013)
