= Snyder, Nebraska =

- Village
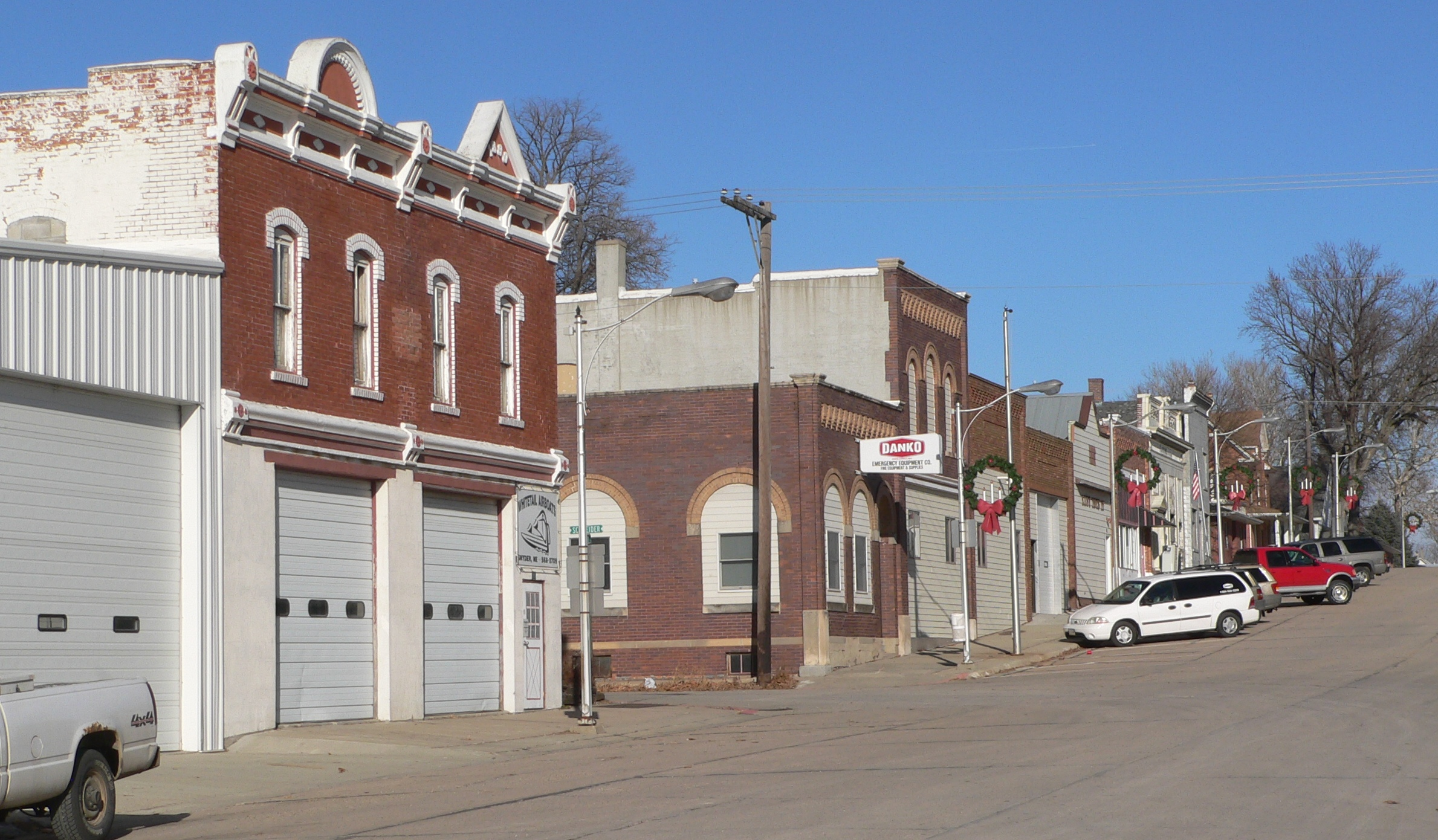
- Downtown Snyder

- Location of Snyder, Nebraska
- Coordinates: 41°42′16″N 96°47′13″W
- Country: United States
- State: Nebraska
- County: Dodge

Area
  - Total: 0.49 sq mi (1.26 km^{2})
  - Land: 0.49 sq mi (1.26 km^{2})
  - Water: 0 sq mi (0.00 km^{2})
- Elevation: 1,342 ft (409 m)

Population (2020)
  - Total: 254
  - Density: 523.5/sq mi (202.11/km^{2})
- Time zone: UTC-6 (Central (CST))
  - Summer (DST): UTC-5 (CDT)
- ZIP code: 68664
- Area code: 402
- FIPS code: 31-45610
- GNIS feature ID: 2399835

Snyder is a village in Dodge County, Nebraska, United States. As of the 2020 census, Snyder had a population of 254.

== History ==
Snyder was platted in 1886 when the Fremont, Elkhorn and Missouri Valley Railroad was extended to that point. It was named for Conrad Schneider, the original owner of the town site. Snyder was incorporated as a village in 1890. Prominent Lutheran radio minister Oswald Hoffmann of the second half of the twentieth century was born in Snyder in 1913.

== Geography ==
According to the United States Census Bureau, the village has a total area of 0.48 square miles (1.24 km^{2}), all land.

== Demographics ==
Historical population
Census	Pop.	Note	%±
1900	229		—
1910	314		37.1%
1920	359		14.3%
1930	458		27.6%
1940	395		−13.8%
1950	369		−6.6%
1960	325		−11.9%
1970	383		17.8%
1980	387		1.0%
1990	280		−27.6%
2000	318		13.6%
2010	300		−5.7%
2020	254		−15.3%
U.S. Decennial Census

=== 2010 census ===
At the 2010 census there were 300 people, 127 households, and 76 families in the village. The population density was 625.0 inhabitants per square mile (241.3/km^{2}). There were 144 housing units at an average density of 300.0 per square mile (115.8/km^{2}). The racial makup of the village was 99.3% White, 0.3% Native American, and 0.3% from two or more races. Hispanic or Latino of any race were 1.3%.

Of the 127 households 29.1% had children under the age of 18 living with them, 49.6% were married couples living together, 4.7% had a female householder with no husband present, 5.5% had a male householder with no wife present, and 40.2% were non-families. 34.6% of households were one person and 14.2% were one person aged 65 or older. The average household size was 2.36 and the average family size was 3.14.

The median age in the village was 41.4 years. 27.3% of residents were under the age of 18; 4.3% were between the ages of 18 and 24; 23.3% were from 25 to 44; 27.3% were from 45 to 64; and 17.7% were 65 or older. The gender makeup of the village was 49.7% male and 50.3% female.

=== 2000 census ===
At the 2000 census there were 318 people, 135 households, and 81 families in the village. The population density was 642.7 inhabitants per square mile (248.1/km^{2}). There were 147 housing units at an average density of 297.1 per square mile (114.7/km^{2}). The racial makup of the village was 97.17% White, 0.63% Native American, 0.31% Asian, and 1.89% from two or more races.

Of the 135 households 30.4% had children under the age of 18 living with them, 50.4% were married couples living together, 8.1% had a female householder with no husband present, and 39.3% were non-families. 34.8% of households were one person and 17.8% were one person aged 65 or older. The average household size was 2.36 and the average family size was 3.05.

The age distribution was 28.0% under the age of 18, 6.0% from 18 to 24, 26.4% from 25 to 44, 20.4% from 45 to 64, and 19.2% 65 or older. The median age was 38 years. For every 100 females, there were 83.8 males. For every 100 females age 18 and over, there were 95.7 males.

As of 2000 the median income for a household in the village was $30,536, and the median family income was $37,917. Males had a median income of $29,135 versus $17,266 for females. The per capita income for the village was $20,365. About 2.4% of families and 7.0% of the population were below the poverty line, including 2.1% of those under age 18 and 11.7% of those age 65 or over.
