= Commotion on the Ocean =

1956 short film by Jules White

- Directed by: Jules White
- Written by: Felix Adler
- Produced by: Jules White
- Starring: Moe Howard; Larry Fine; Shemp Howard; Gene Roth; Harriette Tarler; Joe Palma; Emil Sitka; Charles C. Wilson
- Cinematography: Ray Cory; Henry Freulich (stock footage)
- Edited by: Harold White; Henry DeMond (stock footage)
- Distributed by: Columbia Pictures
- Release date: November 8, 1956 (U.S.)
- Running time: 16:34
- Country: United States
- Language: English

Commotion on the Ocean is a 1956 short subject directed by Jules White starring American slapstick comedy team the Three Stooges (Moe Howard, Larry Fine and Shemp Howard in his final starring role). It is the 174th entry in the series released by Columbia Pictures starring the comedians, who released 190 shorts for the studio between 1934 and 1959.

== Plot ==
The Stooges play janitors who work at a newspaper office, harboring aspirations of transitioning into the domain of journalism. Their entreaties to the managing editor for a chance to prove their mettle as reporters are met with conditional consideration, contingent upon a dinner engagement for deliberation. However, an unforeseen development transpires in the editor's absence, as Moe inadvertently intercepts a critical communication from one of the newspaper's reporters, Smitty, regarding the theft of classified documents by foreign operatives.

This fortuitous revelation catapults the Stooges into an unexpected foray into espionage, as they find themselves entangled in the machinations of Mr. Borscht, a spy harboring the microfilmed documents, who happens to reside in close proximity to the Stooges' abode. The ensuing sequence of events unfolds with the trio embarking as unwitting stowaways aboard an ocean liner, propelled into the perilous expanse of the high seas.

Stranded aboard a freighter, the Stooges navigate a series of misadventures culminating in a triumphant resolution. Their ingenuity and resourcefulness enable them to outmaneuver Borscht, reclaim the pilfered microfilm, and emerge victorious in their pursuit of journalistic acclaim.

== Cast ==
- Moe Howard as Moe
- Larry Fine as Larry
- Shemp Howard as Shemp (stock footage)
  - Joe Palma as Shemp (new footage)
- Gene Roth as Borscht
- Emil Sitka as Smitty
- Harriette Tarler as Emma Blake
- Charles C. Wilson as J. L. Cameron (stock footage)

== Production notes ==
Commotion on the Ocean is a remake of 1949's Dunked in the Deep, using ample stock footage. In addition, the newspaper room scenes were borrowed from 1948's Crime on Their Hands. Commotion on the Ocean was the last of four shorts filmed in the wake of Shemp Howard's death using earlier footage and a double. It marked the final film to feature Shemp as a stooge. He would be replaced by Joe Besser.

The film's plot device of hiding microfilm in watermelons is an allusion to an actual event that occurred in 1948. Time magazine's managing editor Whittaker Chambers, a former Communist spy-turned government informer, accused Alger Hiss of being a member of the Communist Party and a spy for the Soviet Union. In presenting evidence against Hiss, Chambers produced the Pumpkin Papers: five rolls of microfilm of State Department documents, which Chambers had concealed in a hollowed-out pumpkin on his Maryland farm.

=== "Fake Shemp" ===
As Shemp Howard had already died, for his last four films (Rumpus in the Harem, Hot Stuff, Scheming Schemers and Commotion on the Ocean), Columbia utilized supporting actor Joe Palma to be Shemp's double. Even though the last four shorts were remakes of earlier Shemp efforts, Palma's services were needed to link what few new scenes were filmed to the older stock footage.

For Commotion on the Ocean, Palma appears in one new shot during the newspaper office scene. After Larry says, "Oh, I know Smitty: 'Under the spreading chestnut tree, the village smitty stands'", Moe slaps him. Palma gets involved in the slapstick exchange and shields himself in defense, obstructing his face.

All other new footage consists of Moe and Larry working as a duo, often discussing Shemp's absence aloud:

- Moe: "I wonder what became of that Shemp?"
- Larry: "You know he went up on deck to scout for some food."

This leads into the short's only new sequence. Moe and Larry attempt to steal a female passenger's fish dinner; but end up attempting to eat a taxidermy fish; with disastrous results.

This new footage was shot on January 17, 1956, six weeks after Shemp's death and one day after the previous film, Scheming Schemers.

== Quotes ==
- Larry: "You can take my word for it; when it comes to fish, I'm a common-sewer!"

== See also ==
- List of American films of 1956
