= Dunked in the Deep =

1949 film by Jules White

- Directed by: Jules White
- Written by: Felix Adler
- Produced by: Jules White
- Starring: Moe Howard; Larry Fine; Shemp Howard; Gene Roth
- Cinematography: Vincent J. Farrar
- Edited by: Edwin H. Bryant
- Distributed by: Columbia Pictures
- Release date: November 3, 1949 (U.S.)
- Running time: 16:46
- Country: United States
- Language: English

Dunked in the Deep is a 1949 American short subject directed by Jules White starring slapstick comedy team The Three Stooges (Moe Howard, Larry Fine and Shemp Howard). It was written by Felix Adler and is the 119th entry in the series released by Columbia Pictures starring the comedians, who released 190 shorts for the studio between 1934 and 1959.

== Plot ==
The Stooges are deceived into clandestinely boarding a vessel by their neighbor, Mr. Borscht, who is revealed to be an antagonist aligned with a fictional nation resembling the Soviet Union. Adrift at sea aboard a freighter and subsisting on salami, they uncover Borscht's illicit activities involving the concealment of stolen microfilm within watermelons. Following a tumultuous pursuit, the trio apprehend Borscht and retrieve the pilfered microfilm.

== Cast ==
- Moe Howard as Moe and voice on radio
- Larry Fine as Larry
- Shemp Howard as Shemp
- Gene Roth as Borscht

== Production notes ==
The voice heard on the radio broadcast is Moe; Shemp Howard accidentally cut his hand on the lock when he rushes to the door in an effort to open it.

Hiding microfilm in watermelons is an allusion to an actual event from the previous year. In 1948, Time managing editor Whittaker Chambers, a former Communist spy-turned government informer, accused Alger Hiss of being a member of the Communist Party and a spy for the Soviet Union. In presenting evidence against Hiss, Chambers produced the "Pumpkin Papers": five rolls of microfilm of State Department documents, which Chambers had concealed in a hollowed-out pumpkin on his Maryland farm.

Dunked in the Deep was filmed March 29–April 1, 1949 and was actually the 126th Stooge short filmed even though it was released as the 119th. The first seven Stooge shorts released the following year in 1950 had already been completed before Dunked in the Deep began production.

Dunked in the Deep was reworked in 1956 as Commotion on the Ocean, using ample stock footage.
