= Venture of Faith =

1951 US film directed by Frank R. Strayer

- Directed by: Frank Strayer
- Screenplay by: Jesse Lasky Jr.
- Story by: T. G. Eggers
- Produced by: Roland Reed
- Starring: Robert Clarke; Marjorie Lord; Margaret Field
- Cinematography: Walter Strenge
- Edited by: Roy Luby
- Production company: Lutheran Laymen's League
- Distributed by: Lutheran Laymen's League
- Release date: July 2, 1951 (US)
- Running time: 80 minutes
- Country: United States
- Language: English

Venture of Faith, also known by the title The Valparaiso Story, is a 1951 American drama film directed by Frank Strayer and starring Robert Clarke, Marjorie Lord, and Margaret Field. The screenplay was written by Jesse Lasky Jr. from an original story by T. G. Eggers.

== Plot ==
The School of Engineering students at the Lutheran University of Valparaiso discover that they must complete their four-year degree elsewhere. They then convince the faculty and students that they will help build the facilities needed to create a four-year program there.

== Cast ==
- Robert Clarke
- Marjorie Lord
- Jimmy Lloyd
- Margaret Field
- Tom Neal
- Clark Howat
