= Come Live with Me (film) =

1941 American romantic comedy film directed by Clarence Brown

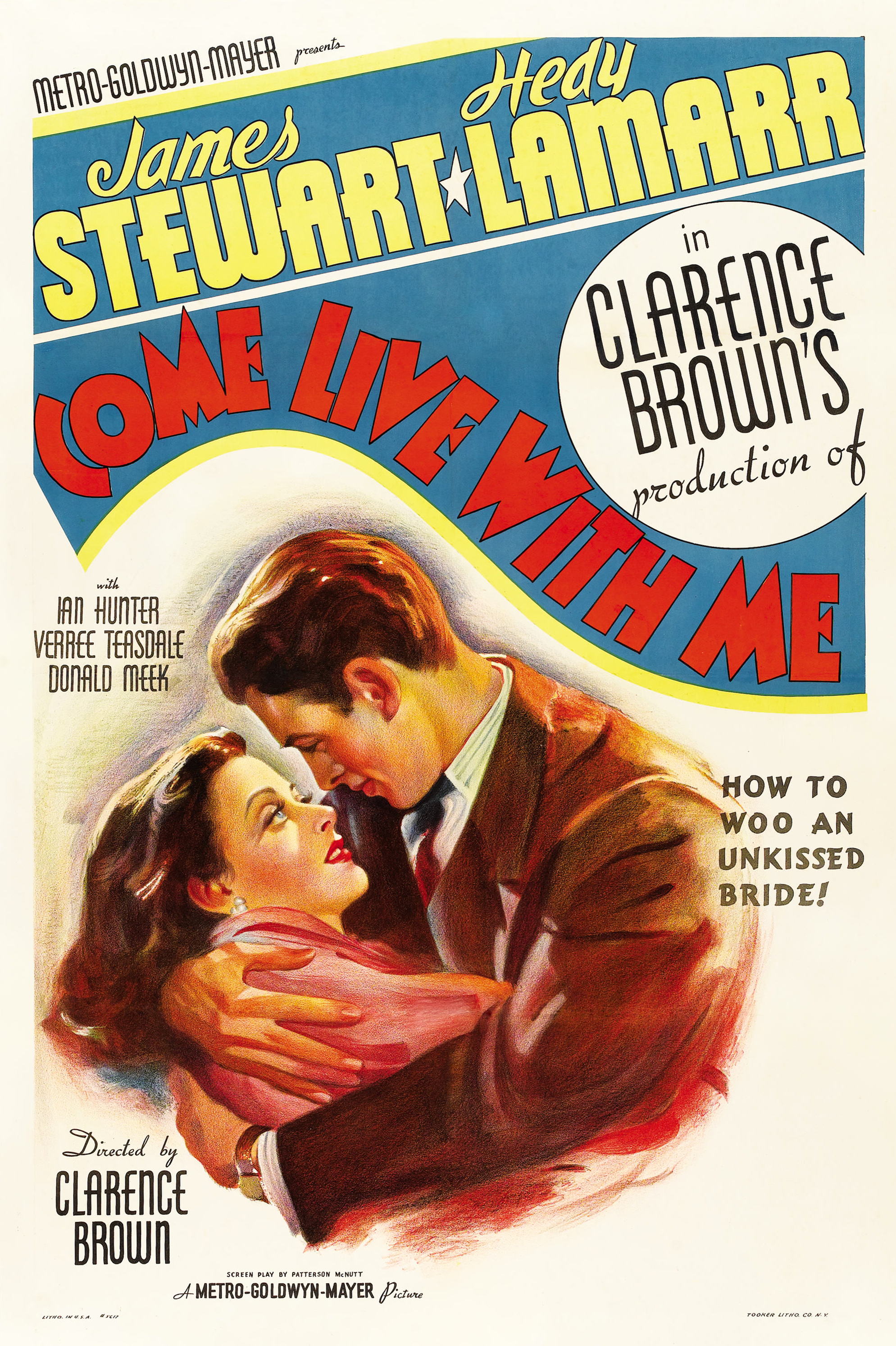
- Theatrical release poster
- Directed by: Clarence Brown
- Screenplay by: Patterson McNutt
- Story by: Virginia Van Upp
- Produced by: Clarence Brown
- Starring: James Stewart; Hedy Lamarr; Ian Hunter; Verree Teasdale; Donald Meek
- Cinematography: George J. Folsey
- Edited by: Frank E. Hull
- Music by: Herbert Stothart
- Production company: Metro-Goldwyn-Mayer
- Distributed by: Loew's Inc.
- Release date: January 31, 1941 (USA)
- Running time: 85 minutes
- Country: United States
- Language: English

Come Live with Me is a 1941 American romantic comedy film produced and directed by Clarence Brown and starring James Stewart, Hedy Lamarr and Ian Hunter. Based on a story by Virginia Van Upp, the film is about a beautiful Viennese refugee seeking United States citizenship who arranges a marriage of convenience with a struggling writer.

The film's title derives from the opening line of Christopher Marlowe's poem "The Passionate Shepherd to His Love" ("Come live with me and be my love").

== Plot ==
Johnny Jones, a native of Vienna, Austria who escaped after its annexation by Nazi Germany, is having an affair with the married Barton Kendrick, a publisher. One night an officer from the Department of Immigration finds her and tells her that she will be deported because her temporary passport expired three months ago. The investigator tells her that if she can be married within a week, she can stay.

Bill Smith, a down-on-his-luck writer, runs into Jones during a rainstorm. She explains to him that she needs to marry an American citizen within a week and since he is broke, she could pay him and they would both get what they need. She pays him $17.80 a week in exchange for marrying her. Two months later, Smith is writing a fictional book based on the odd circumstances of his marriage and becomes curious about Jones, considering he only sees her once a week when she gives him a check.

Meanwhile, Jones is continuing her affair with Kendrick, but refuses to tell him how she has remained in the country. He tells Jones that he is leaving his wife and wants to marry Jones within two months. She goes to Bill and tells him she wants a divorce right away, to which he reluctantly agrees. Smith sends his nearly-completed manuscript to Kendrick's publishing company, where Kendrick's wife Diane explains the book to Kendrick and he realizes that Smith is Jones' husband. Kendrick chooses to publish the book and gives Smith $500 up front. After seeing Kendrick's reaction to the book, his wife realizes that he has been having an affair and that the book is real. Mrs. Kendrick offers to divorce him, but first wants to make sure that Jones is actually in love with her husband.

Flush with sudden unexpected wealth from the book's advance, Smith rents a new car and coerces Jones to go on a trip with him before he will agree to sign the divorce papers. After seeing the picturesque area of Smith's upbringing and meeting his grandmother at her home, Jones ends up falling in love with Bill. Kendrick travels to Smith's grandmother's house, arriving in the middle of the night to retrieve Jones. She is forced to make the decision about whom she really wants, and she chooses her husband Bill.

== Cast ==
- James Stewart as Bill Smith
- Hedy Lamarr as Johnny Jones
- Ian Hunter as Barton Kendrick
- Verree Teasdale as Diana Kendrick
- Donald Meek as Joe Darsie
- Barton MacLane as Barney Grogan
- Edward Ashley as Arnold Stafford
- Ann Codee as Yvonne
- King Baggot as Doorman
- Adeline De Walt Reynolds as Bill's Grandma
- Frank Orth as Jerry
- Frank Faylen as Waiter
- Horace McMahon as Taxi Driver
- Greta Meyer as Frieda
- Fritz Feld as Mac the Headwaiter (uncredited)
- Tom Fadden as Charlie Gephardt-Grandma's Hired Hand (uncredited)

== Production ==
=== Soundtrack ===
- "Die Schönbrunner" Op. 200 (Joseph Lanner)
- "Come Live with Me" (John Liptrot Hatton, Christopher Marlowe)
- "William Tell Overture" (Gioachino Rossini)
- "Oh Johnny, Oh Johnny Oh!" (A. Olman, Ed Rose)
- "There is a Tavern in the Town" (F.J. Adams)
- "Long, Long Ago (1883)" (Thomas Haynes Bayly)
