= Gene Roth =

American actor (1903–1976)

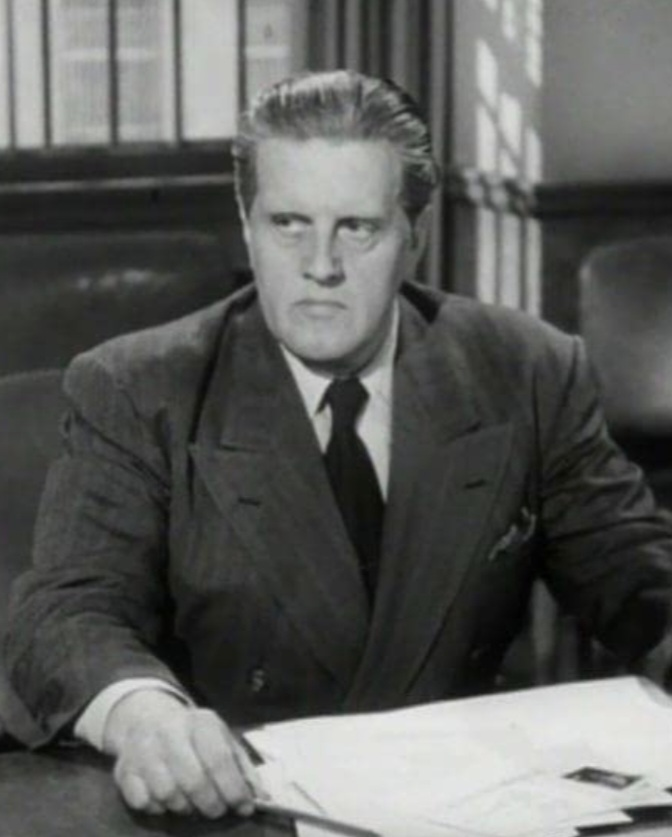
- Roth in The Hoodlum (1951)
- Born: Eugene Oliver Edgar Stutenroth; January 8, 1903; Redfield, South Dakota, U.S.
- Died: July 19, 1976 (aged 73); Los Angeles, California, U.S.
- Other names: Gene Stutenroth; Eugene Stutenroth; Eugene Roth
- Occupations: Actor; film manager
- Years active: 1922–1967

Eugene Oliver Edgar Stutenroth (January 8, 1903 – July 19, 1976), known professionally as Gene Stutenroth or Gene Roth, was an American film actor and former theater manager. He appeared in more than 250 films and television episodes over three decades. He is best known to today's audiences as a villain in the later Three Stooges comedies.

== Early years ==
Stutenroth was born in Redfield, South Dakota. He was the son of a German father and a Swedish mother, who raised their three sons after the father left the family. Stutenroth finished high school in 1920 and became an expert machinist, specializing in repairing and installing pipe organs. These were commonly featured in movie theaters to accompany silent movies, and Roth's constant exposure to theaters prompted him to become a film exhibitor himself.

Gene Stutenroth became a successful manager of movie theaters for Fox and Warner Bros., in Brooklyn, New York; Philadelphia, Pennsylvania; and Burlington, New Jersey. Apart from playing bit roles in two low-budget productions of 1939, his screen career began in earnest in 1943, when he joined the war effort in California. As a trade paper reported, "Exhibitor Stutenroth came to Hollywood with ambition to apply to the manufacture of warplanes the skill he employed in his pre-exhibitor years on the fabrication and installation of pipe organs, and he did so apply it, entering the Lockheed plant, where he still works four hours a day for the purpose."

== Film career ==
Stutenroth was visiting the Universal studio and watching a movie scene being photographed, when a member of the crew noticed that he looked like Ernst "Putzi" Hanfstaengl, then a crony of Adolf Hitler in Nazi Germany. Stutenroth was promptly fitted with makeup and costume, and appeared as a Nazi agent in the wartime serial Adventures of the Flying Cadets (1943). This launched his new career as a character actor. In 1944's The Hitler Gang, a dramatized exposé of Hitler and his cronies, Stutenroth appeared as the very man he resembled, Putzi Hanfstaengl.

Stutenroth's burly frame and craggy features made him ideal as an all-purpose menace, gangster, tough guy, or sheriff. Most of his acting jobs in the mid-1940s were in "B" features for Columbia Pictures and Monogram Pictures. Interestingly, Stutenroth apparently regarded his movie jobs as a sideline and didn't take himself seriously as an actor; as late as 1947 his name doesn't appear in Terry Ramsaye's Motion Picture Almanac, an annual compendium of motion picture professionals. In 1949 he abandoned his given name of Stutenroth and shortened his screen name to "Roth." He also starred as the master villain in the Columbia serials Captain Video (1951), Mysterious Island (1951), and The Lost Planet (1953).

== The Three Stooges ==
Roth is remembered for his portrayals of formidable authority figures in Three Stooges comedies such as Slaphappy Sleuths, Hot Stuff, Quiz Whizz, Outer Space Jitters, and (as a professor) Pies and Guys. His most memorable role was in Dunked in the Deep (1949) as Russian spy Bortsch hiding microfilm. He reprised the role in a remake, Commotion on the Ocean (1956). His most famous line was his threat to Shemp Howard: "Giff me dat fill-um!" ("give me that film" with a Russian accent). His final appearance with the Stooges was in the feature film The Three Stooges Meet Hercules (1962).

== Television ==
Roth made frequent television appearances including seven episodes of The Lone Ranger from 1949 to 1954. Roth portrayed a con man in a Highway Patrol episode "Dead Patrolman" in 1956, and he played a protection racket operator in the episode "Blood Money" in 1958.

Roth appeared three times on Gene Barry's TV western Bat Masterson, once playing "Mayor Oliver Hinton" in the 1959 episode "Election Day", and twice in 1960, once playing a miner in the episode "The Rage of Princess Anne" and another time as a crooked bartender in the episode "The Big Gamble". In 1960, Roth appeared as Davis on the TV western Cheyenne in the episode "Counterfeit Gun." In the early 1960s he made five appearances as a gangster on The Untouchables. His career slowed after a battle with pernicious anemia in 1963, but he recovered sufficiently to accept additional roles until he retired from acting in 1967.

He then operated a liquor store in Hollywood. He returned to the industry in 1974 for a small role in the Planet of the Apes TV series.

== Death ==
Gene Roth was struck and killed by a hit-and-run driver in Los Angeles, California on July 19, 1976. He was 73.

== Selected filmography ==
- Merry-Go-Round (1923) - Guard
- Daughter of the Tong (1939) - Henchman (uncredited)
- Mercy Plane (1939) - Mechanic (uncredited)
- Adventures of the Flying Cadets (1943, Serial) - Brunner, Nazi agent [Chs. 2-4] (uncredited)
- The Strange Death of Adolf Hitler (1943) - Gen. Diebold (uncredited)
- Crazy House (1943) - Dead End Character (uncredited)
- The Cross of Lorraine (1943) - German Officer (uncredited)
- The Spider Woman (1943) - Henchman Taylor (uncredited)
- The Sultan's Daughter (1943) - Ludwig
- Song of Russia (1944) - German Army Commander (uncredited)
- Charlie Chan in the Secret Service (1944) - Luis Philipe Vega
- The Girl in the Case (1944) - Roberts, butler (uncredited)
- Shake Hands with Murder (1944) - William Howard
- The Hitler Gang (1944) - Putzi Hanfstaengel (uncredited)
- The Contender (1944) - 1st Fight Ring Announcer (uncredited)
- Waterfront (1944) - Big Detective (uncredited)
- Are These Our Parents (1944) - Hoodlum (uncredited)
- Louisiana Hayride (1944) - Studio Gate Guard (uncredited)
- Raiders of Ghost City (1944, Serial) - Grattan (uncredited)
- Seven Doors to Death (1944) - Detective Morgan (uncredited)
- San Diego, I Love You (1944) - Stevedore (uncredited)
- Enemy of Women (1944) - Gestapo Announcer (uncredited)
- Rogues' Gallery (1944) - Mr. Joyce
- Strange Journey (1946)
- Gas House Kids in Hollywood (1947)
- Reaching from Heaven (1948)
- Oklahoma Badlands (1948)
- The Sickle or the Cross (1949)
- Dunked in the Deep (1949) - Borscht
- Ghost of Zorro (1949) - George Crane
- Trail of the Rustlers (1950)
- The Hoodlum (1951) - Prison Warden Stevens (uncredited)
- Red Snow (1952)
- Gold Fever (1952)
- Fargo (1952)
- The Lost Planet (1953)
- Wetbacks (1956)
- The Go-Getter (1956) - Head File Clerk
- The Quiet Gun (1957) - Frank Townsend (uncredited)
- Utah Blaine (1957) - Tom Cory
- The True Story of Jesse James (1957) - Railroad Engineer (uncredited)
- Zombies of Mora Tau (1957) - Sam
- God Is My Partner (1957) - Mr. Johnson (uncredited)
- Jet Pilot (1957) - Sokolov's Batman (uncredited)
- Rockabilly Baby (1957) - Harry Johnson
- She Demons (1958) - Igor
- The Young Lions (1958) - Bavarian Café Manager (uncredited)
- Earth vs. the Spider (1958) - Sheriff Cagle
- I Want to Live! (1958) - Eric, Machinist (uncredited)
- Alaska Passage (1959) - Anderson
- The Rebel Set (1959) - Conductor, New York Train
- The Miracle of the Hills (1959) - Sheriff Crane
- The Blue Angel (1959) - Drunken Sea Captain (uncredited)
- Attack of the Giant Leeches (1959) - Sheriff Kovis
- Jet Over the Atlantic (1959)
- G.I. Blues (1960) - Businessman #1 with Klugmann (uncredited)
- Tormented (1960) - Mr. Nelson, lunch stand operator
- Cimarron (1960) - Connors (uncredited)
- Atlantis, the Lost Continent (1961) - Governor of Animals (uncredited)
- The Cat Burglar (1961) - Pete
- Ada (1961) - Chief Justice (uncredited)
- The Three Stooges Meet Hercules (1962) - Captain (uncredited)
- The Wonderful World of the Brothers Grimm (1962) - Berlin Royal Academy Representative at Train Station (uncredited)
- Stagecoach to Dancers' Rock (1962) - Jude
- Tower of London (1962) - The Tailor (uncredited)
- How the West Was Won (1962) - Riverboat Poker Player (uncredited)
- The Courtship of Eddie's Father (1963) - The Minister (uncredited)
- Twice-Told Tales (1963) - Cabman
- The Prize (1963) - Bjornefeldt (uncredited)
- The Best Man (1964) - Pennsylvania Delegate (uncredited)
- Bedtime Story (1964) - German (uncredited)
- Sylvia (1965) - Professor Eglebert (uncredited)
- The Greatest Story Ever Told (1965) - (uncredited)
- Young Dillinger (1965) - Herman, Justice of the Peace
- Torn Curtain (1966) - Guard in Post Office (uncredited)
- Rosie! (1967) - Joseph
