= Adeline De Walt Reynolds =

American actress

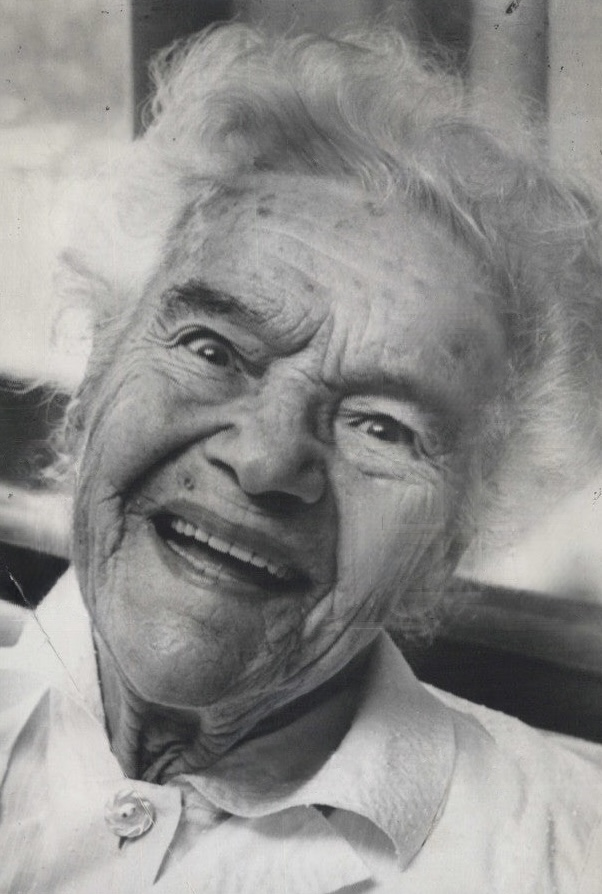
- Reynolds in 1959
- Born: September 19, 1862; Vinton, Iowa, U.S.
- Died: August 13, 1961 (aged 98); Hollywood, California, U.S.
- Resting place: Westwood Memorial Park, Los Ángeles, California
- Occupation: Actress
- Years active: 1930s–1960
- Spouse: Frank Reynolds (m. 1885; died 1905)
- Children: 4

Adeline De Walt Reynolds (September 19, 1862 – August 13, 1961) was an American character actress who made her film debut at the age of 78 playing the grandmother of Jimmy Stewart's character in Come Live with Me (1941). She continued to act in films and numerous television series into her 90s, making her last appearance at 98.

== Early life ==
Adeline De Walt was born in Vinton, Iowa, in 1862, one of 10 children. Among her earliest memories was that of Union soldiers returning from the American Civil War. She had wanted to be an actress since she was five years old, but her father - Jonathan DeWalt, a farmer - was opposed. As an 18 year old she claimed to be 20 to get a hometown teaching job. It was a difficult assignment, and had been refused by several others, but she eventually gained the support of the children and their families. She left after learning that her male colleagues earned more money than she did, and the school board refused to pay her the same.

== Family life ==
After leaving teaching, she married Vinton native Frank Reynolds, with whom she had four children. After the birth of their first child, Mary, in 1885, they moved to Arcadia, Nebraska, where her parents had moved a short time before. Reynolds was offered her father's lumber business, and the couple remained in Arcadia for five years, during which their son William was born. Relocating to Boston, De Walt Reynolds attended and graduated from the Boston Conservatory of Speech. While in Boston, according to some accounts, in 1892, Sir Henry Irving offered De Walt Reynolds a spot in his touring company. She is said to have turned Irving's offer down to raise her children.

The family moved to Philadelphia, and several other cities, before eventually settling in San Francisco, where the pair had their final two children, Franklin and Lela. After Reynolds' untimely death in 1905, Adeline became the family provider. She began studies at a San Francisco secretarial school, prematurely ended by the devastating 1906 earthquake and fire.

== College ==
When her youngest daughter, Lela, entered college at the University of California at Berkeley, De Walt Reynolds once again focused on her own goals. Encouraged by her daughter, De Walt Reynolds entered Berkeley at the age of 64. She majored in French and graduated with honors at 68.

== Acting career ==
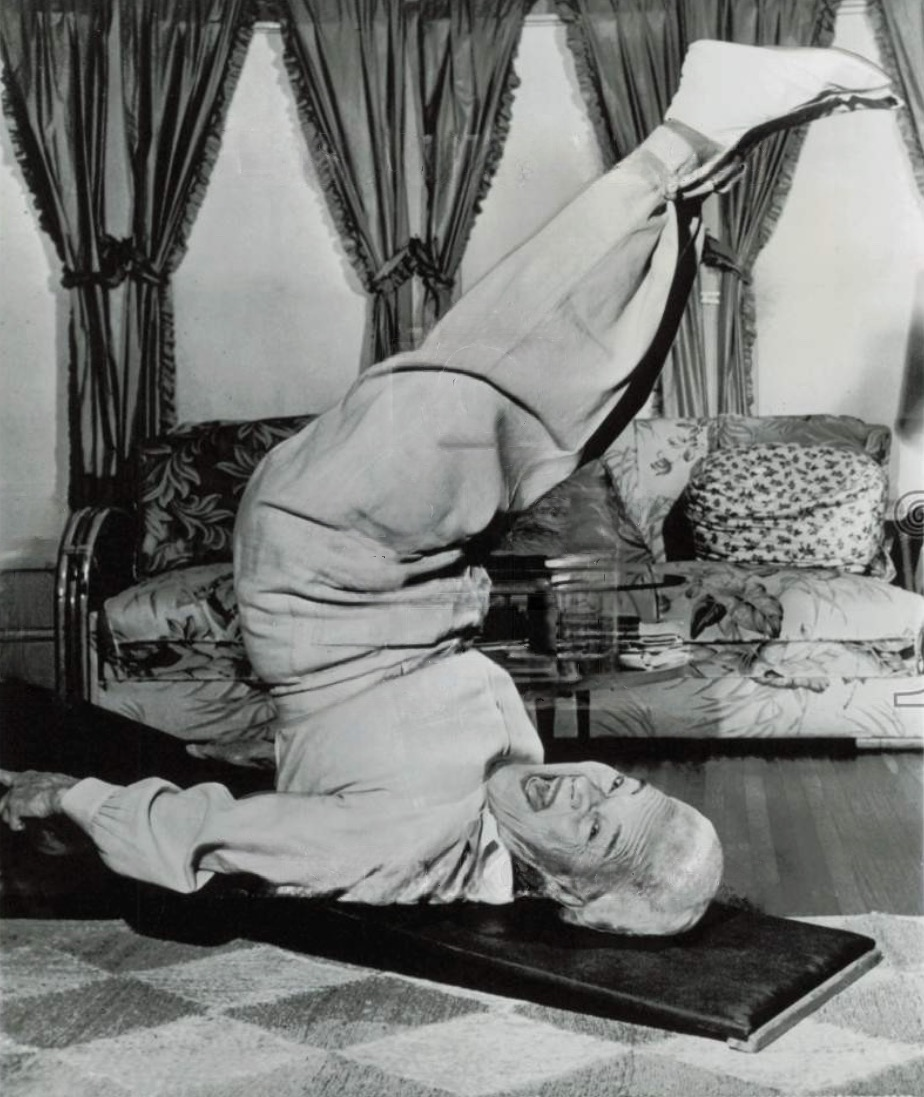
Reynolds exercising on an inclined board

Upon graduation, De Walt Reynolds took acting courses at the university, under the tutelage of Professor von Neumeyer. While she was cast as Hecuba in a school production of The Trojan Women, she made contact with celebrated stage actress Blanche Yurka, who had played the same role in a radio production of the play. The following year, she traveled to Los Angeles and contacted Yurka, asking her advice on beginning a career in film. Yurka found an agent willing to take on an older client, and De Walt Reynolds was cast in a role in an Assistance League production of Landslide. Clarence Brown saw her in the production and cast her in his upcoming film.

=== In film ===
De Walt Reynolds made her film debut with a supporting role in Come Live with Me (1941), playing the grandmother of Jimmy Stewart's character. When asked if she was tired at the end of her first day on the set, she answered, "If you had waited 70 years to do something, you wouldn't be tired?" She received praise for that role, and was called a "potential star" by Clarence Brown.

She indeed had a presence on screen, and played in about two dozen films until 1955, appearing as the mother of Charles Laughton in The Tuttles of Tahiti (1942) and as the mysterious Madame Zimba in Robert Siodmak's horror film Son of Dracula (1943). She was also memorable in the last scene of Going My Way (1944) as aged Mother Fitzgibbon, who travels from Ireland to the United States to see her son. Her last film was The Ten Commandments (1956), where she portrayed a frail old woman in danger.

=== Television ===
She also appeared in numerous television series between 1950 and 1960. She played her last role at the age of 98 on the TV series Playhouse 90 and was the oldest member of the Screen Actors Guild at the time. She also made publicity stories and photos which showed her practicing her fencing or doing calisthenics.

== Death ==
De Walt Reynolds died on August 13, 1961, one month shy of turning 99. She is buried in Westwood Memorial Park, Los Angeles.

== Partial filmography ==
Reynolds made guest appearances on television between 1950 and 1960. The programs include Have Gun – Will Travel, Shirley Temple's Storybook, Zane Grey Theatre, and Peter Gunn

- Come Live with Me (1941) - Grandma
- Shadow of the Thin Man (1941) - Barrow's Landlady (uncredited)
- The Tuttles of Tahiti (1942) - Mama Ruau
- Tales of Manhattan (1942) - Elsa's Old Mother (Laughton sequence)
- Iceland (1942) - Grandma (uncredited)
- Street of Chance (1942) - Grandma Diedrich
- The Human Comedy (1943) - Librarian
- Behind the Rising Sun (1943) - Grandmother
- Son of Dracula (1943) - Madame Zimba
- Happy Land (1943) - Mrs. Schneider
- Going My Way (1944) - Mrs. Molly Fitzgibbon (uncredited)
- Since You Went Away (1944) - Elderly Woman on Train (uncredited)
- A Tree Grows in Brooklyn (1945) - Mrs. Waters (uncredited)
- The Corn Is Green (1945) - Old Woman Reading (uncredited)
- Counter-Attack (1945) - Old Woman (uncredited)
- Messenger of Peace (1947) - Grandma Frommel
- The Girl from Manhattan (1948) - Old woman
- The Sickle or the Cross (1949) - Mrs. Burnside
- Stars in My Crown (1950) - Granny Gailbraith (uncredited)
- Kim (1950) - Old Maharanee (uncredited)
- The Du Pont Story (1950) - Old Lady in Window (uncredited)
- Here Comes the Groom (1951) - Aunt Amy (uncredited)
- Lydia Bailey (1952) - Mme. Antoinette d'Autremont
- Pony Soldier (1952) - White Moon
- Witness to Murder (1954) - The Old Lady - Mental Patient
- The Ten Commandments (1956) - Frail Old Lady (uncredited)
