= Portia on Trial =

1937 film by George Nicholls, Jr.

- Directed by: George Nicholls Jr.
- Written by: Faith Baldwin (story); Samuel Ornitz; Edward E. Paramore Jr.
- Produced by: Albert E. Levoy
- Starring: Frieda Inescort; Heather Angel; Neil Hamilton; Walter Abel
- Cinematography: Harry J. Wild
- Edited by: Howard O'Neill
- Music by: Alberto Colombo
- Production company: Republic Pictures
- Distributed by: Republic Pictures
- Release date: November 8, 1937
- Running time: 72 minutes
- Country: United States
- Language: English

Portia on Trial is a 1937 American film about a trial based on story of Faith Baldwin and directed by George Nicholls Jr. It was nominated to win the Oscar for Best Music in the 10th Academy Awards.

== Plot ==
Lady lawyer Portia Merryman defends woebegone Elizabeth Manners, who is on trial for shooting her lover Earle Condon.

== Cast ==
Actor/Actress	Character
Walter Abel	Dan Foster
Frieda Inescort	Portia Merriman
Neil Hamilton	Earle Condon
Heather Angel	Elizabeth Manners
Ruth Donnelly	Jane Wilkins
Barbara Pepper	Evelyn
Clarence Kolb	John Condon
Anthony Marsh	Richard Conlan
Paul Stanton	Judge
George Cooper	Efe
John Kelly	Hank
Hobart Bosworth	Governator
Ian MacLaren	Father Caslez
Leo Gorcey	Joe Gannow
