= Oswald Hoffmann =

American clergyman and broadcaster

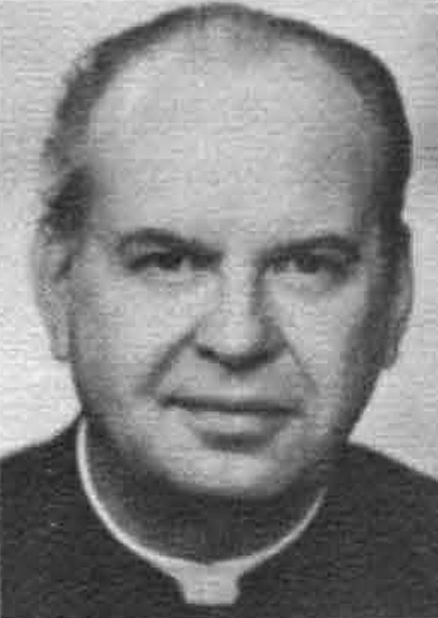
- Oswald Hoffmann in 1974
- Born: Oswald Carl Julius Hoffmann; December 6, 1913; Snyder, Nebraska, U.S.
- Died: September 8, 2005 (aged 91); St. Louis, Missouri, U.S.
- Education: Concordia University, Saint Paul (1932) University of Minnesota, M.A. (1935) Concordia Seminary (1936)
- Occupations: Lutheran Church–Missouri Synod pastor, writer
- Known for: Lutheran Hour radio broadcast (1955–1988)
- Awards: D.D. (hon.), Concordia Seminary; J. D. (hon.), Valparaiso University; LHD (hon.), Philippine Christian University; National Religious Broadcasters Hall of Fame (1999)

Oswald Carl Julius Hoffmann (December 6, 1913 – September 8, 2005) was an American clergyman and broadcaster who was best known as a speaker for The Lutheran Hour, a long-running radio program affiliated with the Lutheran Church–Missouri Synod (LCMS). During his time on the Lutheran Hour, the weekly broadcast was heard on 1,200 stations in the U.S. and in thirty other nations.

== Background ==
Oswald Carl Julius Hoffmann was born on December 6, 1913, in Snyder, Nebraska, the son of Carl and Bertha (née Seidel) Hoffmann. Both his father and grandfather were Lutheran ministers. He recalled in his autobiography, What Is There to Say But Amen?, that as a five-year old he frequently heard the bell tolling at the church pastored by his father for the victims of the Spanish flu pandemic of 1918. Hoffmann's family moved to Springfield, Illinois, in 1921, when his father became a professor at Concordia Theological Seminary there. After the family subsequently moved to Chicago, Hoffmann attended high school at the Luther Institute.

Hoffmann earned a Bachelor's degree in 1932 at Concordia University, Saint Paul. He earned a Master of Arts degree from the University of Minnesota in 1935 and completed his seminary training at Concordia Seminary in St. Louis in 1936, where he was later awarded an honorary Doctor of Divinity degree. He also received an honorary Doctor of Laws degree from Valparaiso University in Valparaiso, Indiana, and an honorary Doctor of Humane Letters from the Philippine Christian University in Manila, The Philippines.

== Career ==
Ordained a Lutheran minister in 1939, Hoffmann served as a Lutheran pastor, as a college professor, and as director of public relations for the Lutheran Church–Missouri Synod. He spent the early years of his career as an instructor, professor, and director of the choir at Bethany Lutheran College in Mankato, Minnesota (1936–1940); the University of Minnesota in Minneapolis-St. Paul (1940–1941); and Concordia Collegiate Institute in Bronxville, New York. In 1948, Hoffmann helped found the LCMS Department of Public Relations in New York City and served as its director until 1963. He served as president of the Lutheran Council in the U.S.A. (1970–1973). A recognized authority on Latin and Greek, Hoffmann was chairman of the translations committee of the American Bible Society, and in 1977 he was elected president of the United Bible Societies.

On September 25, 1955, Hoffmann initiated the 23rd season as Lutheran Hour speaker. He served in that position for thirty-three years, broadcasting his last Lutheran Hour program from mainland China on Christmas Day, 1988. Hoffmann is the namesake of the Oswald Hoffmann School of Christian Outreach (OHSCO) at Concordia University, St. Paul. OHSCO (now known as the Oswald Hoffmann Institute for Christian Outreach) was founded in 1984 as a center for evangelism and mission studies in which students are trained for professional outreach ministries. In a 1987 interview, Hoffmann cautioned that radio and television ministers must be on guard against being influenced by public adulation, saying it verged on idolatry. A minister should be mindful that they are but "a servant of the Most High", he said.

== Legacy ==
Hoffmann was the author of eight books, including Hurry Home Where You Belong. His autobiography, What Is There to Say But Amen? was published in 1996. He was inducted into the National Religious Broadcasters Hall of Fame in 1999. Hoffmann died on September 8, 2005, at age 91, in St. Louis, Missouri. His wife of sixty years, Marcia Hoffmann (née Linnell), whom he had married on June 23, 1940, died in 2000. He was survived by four children, three sons and a daughter. Two of his sons followed in their father's footsteps, becoming Lutheran ministers themselves.
