= Messenger of Peace =

1947 film directed by Frank R. Strayer

- Directed by: Frank Strayer
- Screenplay by: Glenn Tryon
- Story by: Henry Rische
- Produced by: Roland Reed
- Starring: John Beal; Peggy Stewart; Paul Guilfoyle
- Cinematography: Walter Strenge
- Edited by: Jack Ogilvie
- Music by: Alberto Colombo
- Production company: Lutheran Laymen's League
- Distributed by: Lutheran Laymen's League
- Release date: October 1, 1947 (US)
- Running time: 87 minutes
- Country: United States
- Language: English

Messenger of Peace is a 1947 American drama film directed by Frank Strayer, which stars John Beal, Peggy Stewart, and Paul Guilfoyle. The screenplay was written by Glenn Tryon from an original story by Henry Rische. It was produced by the Lutheran Laymen's League, a men's association affiliated with the Lutheran Church–Missouri Synod as part of their centennial celebration.

== Cast list ==
- John Beal as Rev. Armin Ritter
- Peggy Stewart as Evangeline Lockley
- Paul Guilfoyle as Peter Kerl
- Fred Essler as Hans Dacher
- Adeline De Walt Reynolds as Grandma Frommel
- Raphael Bennett as Gus Frommel
- Maudie Prickett as Matty Frommel
- Al Bridges as Harry Franzmeier
- Elizabeth Kerr as Lottie Franzmeier
- William Gould as Jacob Torgel
- Edythe Elliott as Hilda Torgel
- Brooke Shane as Magda Torgel
- Joe Brown Jr. as Ted Horner
- William Bakewell as Pastor Willie Von Adel Jr.
