= Alberto Colombo (composer) =

American film composer and music director

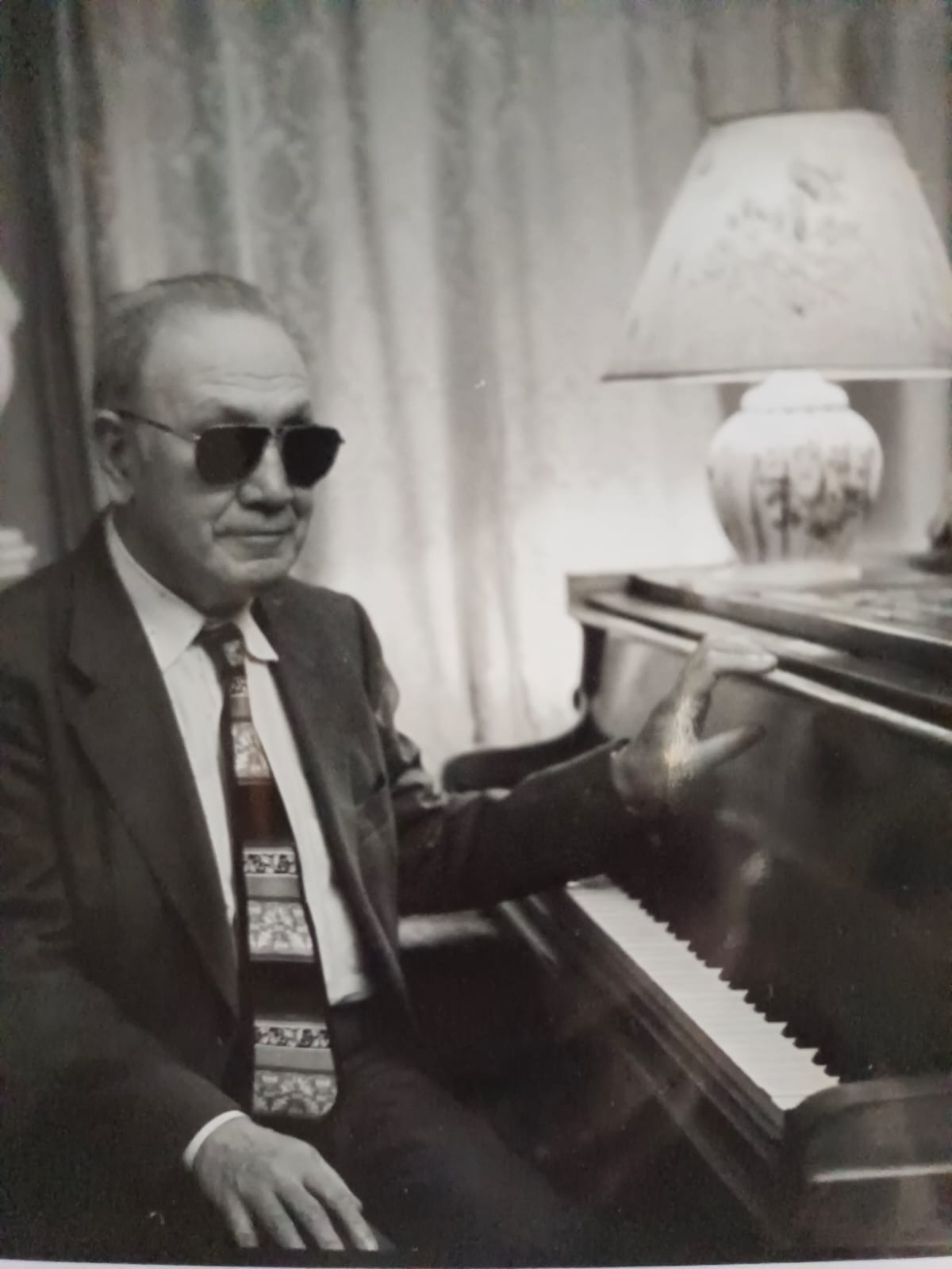
- Born: November 27, 1888; New York City
- Died: March 24, 1954 (aged 65); Los Angeles, California
- Other names: Al Colombo; Albert Colombo
- Occupations: Film composer and music director
- Years active: 1934–1954

Alberto Colombo (November 27, 1888 – March 24, 1954) was an American film composer, cellist, and music director.

He was nominated at the 10th Academy Awards in the category of Best Score for the film Portia on Trial.

He contributed to over 100 films.

== Selected filmography ==
- Chatterbox (1936)
- The Wrong Road (1937)
- Portia on Trial (1937)
- Exiled to Shanghai (1937)
- Hi-Yo Silver (1940)
- Messenger of Peace (1947)
- Reaching from Heaven (1948)
- The Sickle or the Cross (1949)
- The Pilgrimage Play (1949)
