= The Lutheran Hour =

- Running time: 30 minutes
- Original release: October 2, 1930
- Website: lutheranhour.org

The Lutheran Hour is a U.S.-based Christian radio program produced by Lutheran Hour Ministries. The weekly broadcast began on October 2, 1930, as an outreach ministry of the Lutheran Laymen's League, part of the Lutheran Church–Missouri Synod (LCMS). Since 2018, Rev. Dr. Michael Zeigler is the current speaker of The Lutheran Hour. During the 1950s–1980s, the program was heard on 1,200 stations in the U.S. and in thirty other nations. Its motto is "Bringing Christ to the Nations".

== History ==
On October 2, 1930, the Lutheran Laymen's League began the weekly national broadcast of The Lutheran Hour with Walter A. Maier as the first speaker. Initially, the program was on 32 stations of the CBS network. Maier continued as the program's well-known speaker for the next twenty years (1930–1950). In 1940, The Lutheran Hour began a Spanish-language broadcast by Dr. Andrew Melendez. Beginning in 1955, Oswald Hoffmann became speaker for the next thirty-three years (1955–1988), heard on 1,200 stations in the U.S. and in thirty other nations. In 1992, the Lutheran Laymen's League selected "Lutheran Hour Ministries" as the overall identity for its media outreach programs. By 2012, The Lutheran Hour was heard on 800 stations in the U.S. and on the American Forces Network, consisting of organ and choral music preceding the speaker's sermonette and a recitation of the Lord's Prayer.

== Speakers ==
Michael Zeigler has been The Lutheran Hour's speaker since October 2018. An engineering graduate of the Air Force Academy, he served as an officer in the U.S. Air Force until 2006, when he entered Concordia Seminary to become a Lutheran minister. He holds Master of Divinity and PhD degrees. Although music is no longer a part of the program, the traditional conclusion of each broadcast with the speaker's offering of the Lord's Prayer continues.

The show has had a number of speakers:

- Walter A. Maier (1930–1950)
- Andrew Melendez (1941–1972) (Spanish Lutheran Hour)
- Lawrence Acker (1950–1951)
- Armin C. Oldsen (1951–1953)
- Oswald Hoffmann (1955–1988)
- Wallace Schulz (1977–2002) (associate speaker)
- Dale A. Meyer (1989–2001; guest speaker November 2017–September 2018)
- Kenneth R. Klaus (2002–2011; guest speaker November 2017–September 2018)
- Gregory P. Seltz (2011–October 29, 2017)
- Michael Zeigler (2018–present)

=== 2002 controversy ===
In July 2002, weeks after his promotion from associate speaker to main speaker, Wallace Schulz was involved in an LCMS controversy that resulted in his leaving the broadcast. Acting in his capacity as LCMS Second Vice President, Schulz suspended LCMS Atlantic District president David Benke, ruling that Benke, by taking part in an inter-faith prayer event at Yankee Stadium to commemorate the victims of the September 11, 2001, terrorist attacks, had engaged in syncretism and unionism, practices prohibited by the LCMS. (Benke's suspension was later overturned on appeal.) The show's board of governors, shortly following Schulz's elevation to main speaker, had requested that he recuse himself from the Benke adjudication to avoid "a conflict of interest" in his duties to the Lutheran Laymen's League, which operates Lutheran Hour Ministries and had not taken an official position on the Benke case in order to avoid alienating members holding differing views on the issue. When Schulz accepted the Benke case, the board relieved him of his duties while keeping him on the payroll, stating that the radio program had been "compromised" by Schulz's participation in church politics, and that it might serve to "polarize" the International Lutheran Laymen's League. The LLL offered Schulz a return to the show under condition that he accept stipulations for future conduct, but Schulz refused to accept these restrictions and thus did not return to the show.

Schulz's removal, like the Benke case itself, proved controversial within the LCMS. His supporters argued that Schulz had a constitutional duty to rule in the case, and thus could not recuse himself upon the board of governors’ request. Eric Stefanski, in a column published by the conservative LCMS group Concord, accused the LLL of waging "a massive, twisted PR battle" against Schulz, and of presenting him with "ultimatums that no pastor could agree to without denying his Ordination vows." Supporters of Schulz also argued that a drop in financial receipts at the ILLL, which led to layoffs and program cancellations in 2003, were attributable primarily to donor and listener dissatisfaction over the speaker's removal. Opponents of Schulz's actions praised the decision to suspend the speaker, with many arguing, as a column published by the liberal LCMS organization Jesus First stated, that those who disagreed with Schulz's actions were "working hard to present views more representative of this church".
