= The Pilgrimage Play =

1949 film directed by Frank R. Strayer

- Directed by: Frank Strayer
- Written by: Arthur Pierson
- Produced by: Roland Reed
- Starring: Nelson Leigh; Stephen Chase; Leonard Penn
- Cinematography: Walter Strenge
- Edited by: Roy Luby
- Music by: Alberto Colombo
- Production company: Roland Reed Productions
- Distributed by: Preferred Pictures
- Release date: May 2, 1949 (US)
- Running time: 90 minutes
- Country: United States
- Language: English

The Pilgrimage Play is a 1949 historical drama film directed by Frank Strayer, from an original screenplay by Arthur Pierson. It was adapted from the play by Christine Wetherill Stevenson. The film stars Nelson Leigh, Stephen Chase, and Leonard Penn.

== Cast list ==
- Nelson Leigh as Jesus of Nazareth
- Stephen Chase as Simon called Peter
- Leonard Penn as Judas Iscariot
- Richard Hale as Pontius Pilate
- Tudor Owen as Nicodemus
- John Doucette as Lord Zadok
- Gene Cates as John the Beloved
- Earl Smith as Blind beggar
- Fiona O'Shiel as Mary Magdala
- Helen Wood as Mary Mother
- Crane Whitley as Longinus
- John Parrish as John the Baptist
- C. Montague Shaw as Caiaphas
- King Donovan as Salathiel
- Wendy Howard as Martha
- Helen Glover as Mary of Bethany
- Elizabeth Harrower as Woman of Samaria
- Dana Skolfield as James
- Bob Buzzell as Matthew
- Pix Miller as Phillip
- Charles Alvin Bell as Andrew
- J. Roger Wood as Thomas
- Charles Clark as Bartholomew
- George Navarro as James Alpheus
- Harry McKnight as Thaddeus
- Dan Quigg as Simon the Canaanite
- Bill Shaw as Scribe
- Paul McGuire as Malchus
- Ed Rees as Barak
- Sol Winet as Jacob Jehosephat
- Steve Cardwell as Augustus
- Adeline Johnston as Joanna
- Margaret Adams as Susanna
- Beverly Billman as Adultress
- Martha Cates as Rebecca
- Jean O'Malley as Rowena
- Tempe Pigott as Serving woman
- Rachel Foulger as Old patriarch's daughter
- William Milner as Man with child
- Geoffrey Alan as Lazarus
