= The Sickle or the Cross =

1949 film directed by Frank R. Strayer

- Directed by: Frank Strayer
- Screenplay by: Jesse L. Lasky Jr.
- Story by: T. G. Eggers
- Produced by: Roland Reed
- Starring: Kent Taylor; Gloria Holden; Gene Lockhart
- Cinematography: Walter Strenge
- Edited by: Roy Luby
- Music by: Alberto Colombo
- Production company: Lutheran Laymen's League
- Distributed by: Lutheran Laymen's League
- Release date: July 1, 1949 (US)
- Running time: 74 minutes
- Country: United States
- Language: English

The Sickle or the Cross is a 1949 American drama film directed by Frank Strayer, which stars Kent Taylor, Gloria Holden, and Gene Lockhart. The screenplay was written by Jesse L. Lasky Jr. from an original story by T. G. Eggers. Produced and distributed by the Lutheran Laymen's League, it had its world premiere in Burbank, California on July 1, 1949.

== Cast ==
- Kent Taylor as Rev. John Burnside, aka Comrade X-14
- Gloria Holden as Louise Canon
- Gene Lockhart as James Johnson
- David Bruce as George Hart
- Emmett Vogan as Walt Deems
- Kathleen Lockhart as Martha Deems
- Margaret Kerry as Betty Deems
- Arthur Stone as Tommy Deems
- Dudley Dickerson as Horatio
- Adeline De Walt Reynolds as Mrs. Burnside
- John Eldredge as Rev. Dodge
- Ivan Triesault as Morse
- Charles Halton as Dr. Short
- Gene Roth as Pakin
- Gayne Whitman as Tim Matthews
- Philip Ahn as Chinese official
- Victor Sen Yung as Chinese official
