= Reaching from Heaven =

1948 film directed by Frank R. Strayer

- Directed by: Frank Strayer
- Screenplay by: Charles Palmer
- Story by: Henry Rische; H. W. Gockel
- Produced by: Roland Reed
- Starring: Hugh Beaumont; Cheryl Walker; John Qualen
- Cinematography: Walter Strenge
- Edited by: Roy Luby
- Music by: Alberto Colombo
- Production company: Lutheran Church–Missouri Synod
- Distributed by: Lutheran Church–Missouri Synod
- Release date: February 1, 1948 (US)
- Running time: 81 minutes
- Country: United States
- Language: English

Reaching from Heaven is a 1948 American drama film directed by Frank Strayer, which stars Hugh Beaumont, Cheryl Walker, and John Qualen. The screenplay was written by Charles Palmer, from an original story by Henry Rische and H. W. Gockel.

== Plot ==
Just as church services are letting out, a shabbily-dressed stranger is run over by an automobile in front of the church. The stranger is helped mentally and physically by the minister and congregation members, who help him regain his self-confidence and also to accept the death of his wife, as she was about to embark from Europe, as a displaced person, to join him in America. They help bring his five-year-old daughter to the United States, and the congregation makes a home for him and his daughter. The young lady who caused his accident, the town banker's daughter, takes a job to pay for his hospital expenses.

== Cast ==
- Hugh Beaumont as Bill Starling
- Cheryl Walker as Madeline Bradley
- John Qualen as The stranger
- Regis Toomey as Pastor
- Chas. Evans as Walter Graves
- Margaret Hamilton as Sophia Manley
- Addison Richards as Max Bradley
- Nana Bryant as Mrs. Kay Bradley
- Mae Clarke as Dorothy Gram
- Jack Lambert as Buck Huggins
- Ann Lee Doran as Martha Kestner
- George Chandler as Bert Kestner
- Gene Roth as Kestners' neighbor
