= Slappily Married =

- Directed by: Edward Bernds
- Written by: Edward Bernds; Elwood Ullman; Monte Collins
- Produced by: Hugh McCollum
- Starring: Joe DeRita; Christine McIntyre; Jean Willes; Florence Auer; Symona Boniface; Dick Wessel
- Cinematography: George F. Kelley
- Edited by: Henry DeMond
- Distributed by: Columbia Pictures
- Release date: November 7, 1946
- Running time: 16:55
- Country: United States
- Language: English

Slappily Married is an American short subject by Columbia Pictures, released on November 7, 1946. The short was directed by Edward Bernds and stars Joe DeRita, who later joined the Three Stooges and became "Curly Joe" DeRita, and features Christine McIntyre, Dorothy Granger and Dick Wessel. It is the first of four shorts in the Joe DeRita series produced by Columbia from 1946-1948; all entries were remakes of other Columbia shorts.

== Plot ==
Dress shop owner Joe Bates is a happily married man who dreads Friday the 13th. Fearing the worst, Joe decides to stay home to avoid any catastrophes, but his wife tells him that he is being superstitious. Joe agrees with her and decides to start preparing breakfast, but things quickly go wrong. Food starts flying everywhere, dishes fall and break all over the place and a mixing bowl of waffle batter drapes all over Joe. When his wife returns to the kitchen, she tells him that yesterday was Friday the 13th and to start getting ready for work.

Later at the dress shop, Joe mistakes a female customer for a mannequin. When her jealous fiancee goes over to see what is going on, a nervous Joe tells him that it was a misunderstanding. Another problem occurs shortly after when the same customer and another one get into a scuffle involving a hat they both want to purchase. Joe tries to break up the fight, but gets knocked to the floor along with the first customer. The fiancee, as well as Joe's wife, shows up again, with Joe's wife thinking that he is cheating on him and runs off, leaving Joe to get punched out by the fiancee.

Joe eventually tracks down his wife at the Amazon hotel, for women only. The concierge tells Joe that she was given orders that his wife does not want to be disturbed, but Joe manages to disguise himself as a woman to find his wife's room, but winds up in that of the female customer he met earlier and also has to dodge her fiancee and a female house detective, before finally reuniting with his wife at the end.

== Cast ==
- Joe DeRita - Joe Bates
- Christine McIntyre - Mrs. Bates
- Dorothy Granger - Honey
- Dick Wessel - Honey's husband
- Jean Willes - Dress store customer
- Symona Boniface - Hotel desk clerk
- Florence Auer - Violet, hotel matron

== Production notes ==
Slappily Married is a remake of the 1943 Andy Clyde short A Maid Made Mad.

DeRita did not think highly of his output at Columbia Pictures, once commenting, "My comedy in those scripts was limited to getting hit on the head with something, then going over to my screen wife to say, 'Honey, don't leave me!' For this kind of comedy material, you could have gotten a busboy to do it and it would have been just as funny."
