= The Outlaws Is Coming =

1965 film by Norman Maurer

The Outlaws IS Coming!
- Film poster
- Directed by: Norman Maurer
- Screenplay by: Elwood Ullman
- Story by: Norman Maurer
- Produced by: Norman Maurer
- Starring: Moe Howard; Larry Fine; Joe DeRita; Adam West; Nancy Kovack; Mort Mills; Don Lamond
- Cinematography: Irving Lippman
- Edited by: Aaron Nibley
- Music by: Paul Dunlap
- Color process: Black and white
- Production company: Normandy Productions
- Distributed by: Columbia Pictures
- Release date: January 14, 1965 (U.S.)
- Running time: 89 minutes
- Country: United States
- Language: English
- Box office: $1,000,000

The Outlaws Is Coming (stylized as The Outlaws IS Coming!) is the sixth and final theatrical comedy feature film starring The Three Stooges after their 1959 resurgence in popularity. By this time, the trio consisted of Moe Howard, Larry Fine and Joe DeRita (dubbed "Curly Joe"). As with its predecessor, The Three Stooges Go Around the World in a Daze, the film was co-written, produced and directed by Howard's son-in-law Norman Maurer. The supporting cast features Adam West, Nancy Kovack and Emil Sitka, who plays three roles.

== Plot ==
In 1871 in the frontier town of Casper, Wyoming, the nefarious Rance Roden devises a scheme to eradicate the buffalo population, which will incite unrest among the Indians. His ulterior motive is to eliminate the U.S. Cavalry, his true adversary, allowing him and his cohorts to seize control of the Western territories.

Simultaneously, the editorial board of a Boston magazine learns of the buffalo massacre and dispatches assistant editor Kenneth Cabot to Casper to investigate the matter. Coincidentally, Cabot learns of his new assignment while Moe, Larry, and Curly-Joe visit his photographic studio to capture an image of his pet skunk.

Upon arriving in Casper, Cabot's adept marksmanship, clandestinely aided by the sharpshooter Annie Oakley, earns him the position of town sheriff. Rance's plan to eliminate Cabot is thwarted when the Stooges surreptitiously infiltrate his gang's hideout and immobilize their firearms. Confronted by Cabot, the gang members choose path of justice over that of lawlessness. Meanwhile, Rance and his associate Trigger endeavor to arm the Indians, including the provision of an armored wagon equipped with a Gatling gun and cannon. However, their scheme is foiled by the Stooges, who capture photographic evidence of the illicit arms sale.

In addition to his acts of valor, Cabot demonstrates his mettle in other endeavors, ultimately culminating in his union with Oakley, cementing their shared commitment to justice and righteousness.

Curly Joe comments that just like in the Big Budget Westerns,they're going to ride off into the sunset. A torrential rain immediately begins,and Moe and Larry belabor Curly Joe with slaps.

== Cast ==
- Moe Howard as Moe
- Larry Fine as Larry
- Joe DeRita as Curly-Joe
- Adam West as Kenneth Cabot
- Nancy Kovack as Annie Oakley
- Mort Mills as Trigger Mortis
- Don Lamond as Rance Roden
- Rex Holman as Sunstroke Kid
- Emil Sitka as Mr. Abernathy/Medicine Man/Cavalry Colonel
- Henry Gibson as Charlie Horse
- Murray Alper as Chief Crazy Horse
- Tiny Brauer as Bartender

The Outlaws

- Joe Bolton as Rob Dalton
- Bill Camfield as Wyatt Earp
- Hal Fryar as Johnny Ringo
- Johnny Ginger as Billy the Kid
- Wayne Mack as Jesse James
- Ed T. McDonnell as Bat Masterson
- Bruce Sedley as Cole Younger
- Paul Shannon as Wild Bill Hickok
- Sally Starr as Belle Starr

== Production ==
Upon release of The Outlaws Is Coming, a number of English teachers expressed displeasure over the movie's grammatically incorrect title. The title is a satire of Alfred Hitchcock's 1963 film The Birds, which features the tagline "The Birds Is Coming".

The film satirizes many 1960s fads, films and television commercials as well as the Western genre. In a nod to television's key role in the resurgence of the Three Stooges' popularity, the outlaw characters were played by local television hosts from across the U.S. whose shows featured the old Three Stooges Columbia shorts.

Adam West spoke about his involvement with the film and with the Three Stooges:

The Outlaws Is Coming. What a wonderful experience! Our first meeting at the Columbia ranch, one morning quite early, and I went in to makeup and got on my western duds and came out in the street. And I saw Larry Fine sitting in a chair and I think his wife was yelling at him about something. Actually, the guys were very serious off camera, their demeanors. They were very serious artists in their own way and I was surprised how quiet they were in respect to their screen personae. I think the funniest little incident of the picture that I remember, the main thrust of the plot was that we were trying to save the buffalo and I was the young lawyer from Boston and we had the same interests and that's how we got together. So we spent the movie trying to save the buffalo. The wrap party at the end of the movie and Moe says, 'Ok, everyone's invited to my place in Bel Air for a buffalo barbecue!' And that sort of typifies these three restless knights. I never really spent much time with them away from the set. People don't do that often in Hollywood, you know, you're doing a series and you spend eighteen hours a day with people and you just kind of want to get away from them, it's probably more helpful that way. I wanted to go home with the Stooges every night, but they wouldn't let me!

== See also ==
- List of American films of 1965
