= Wedlock Deadlock =

- Directed by: Edward Bernds
- Screenplay by: Elwood Ullman
- Story by: Clyde Bruckman
- Produced by: Hugh McCollum
- Starring: Joe DeRita; Christine McIntyre; Patsy Moran; Esther Howard; Charles Williams; Dorothy Granger
- Edited by: Henry DeMond
- Distributed by: Columbia Pictures
- Release date: December 18, 1947
- Running time: 16:20
- Country: United States
- Language: English

Wedlock Deadlock is a 1947 American comedy short film directed by Edward Bernds and starring Joe DeRita, Dorothy Granger and Norman Ollestead. It was written by Elwood Ullman and released by Columbia Pictures on December 18, 1947. It was the third of four shorts in the Joe DeRita series produced by Columbia from 1946–1948; all entries were remakes of other Columbia shorts.

== Premise ==
Just as Eddie and his bride Betty are getting settled into their new home, her irascible family comes to visit.

== Cast ==
- Joe DeRita as Eddie
- Christine McIntyre as Betty
- Esther Howard as Mother
- Charles Williams as Chester
- Patsy Moran as Aunt Hortense
- William Newell as Dick
- Dorothy Granger as Ruby

== Production notes ==
Wedlock Deadlock is a remake of the Monte Collins short film Unrelated Relations (1936).

DeRita did not think highly of his output at Columbia Pictures, once commenting, "My comedy in those scripts was limited to getting hit on the head with something, then going over to my screen wife to say, 'Honey, don't leave me!' For this kind of comedy material, you could have gotten a busboy to do it and it would have been just as funny."
