= The Good Bad Egg =

- Directed by: Jules White
- Written by: Al Giebler; Elwood Ullman
- Produced by: Jules White
- Starring: Joe DeRita; Dorothy Granger; Norman Ollestad; Emil Sitka; Vernon Dent; Victor Travers
- Cinematography: Fred Mandl
- Edited by: Edwin H. Bryant
- Distributed by: Columbia Pictures
- Release date: March 20, 1947
- Running time: 17:16
- Country: United States
- Language: English

The Good Bad Egg is an American comedy short released by Columbia Pictures on March 20, 1947, starring Joe DeRita, who later joined The Three Stooges and became "Curly Joe" DeRita, and featuring Dorothy Granger, and Norman Ollestead. This was the second of four shorts in the Joe DeRita series produced by Columbia from 1946-1948; all entries were remakes of other Columbia shorts.

== Plot ==
Joe Priggle (Joe DeRita) is an inventor staying at a rest home where he tells the story to its proprietor (Vernon Dent) his strong dislike, eggs. It all starts when he fouls up one of his inventions to a client (Emil Sitka) when he finds an egg with an address written on it, the address belongs to a single woman Florabell (Dorothy Granger). He ends up marrying her, but soon finds out that she has an obnoxious brat of a son Rudolph (Norman Ollestead). He causes nothing but trouble for Joe by shooting him in the rear end with a slingshot, a BB gun and gets blown to bits by a miniature cannon. Meanwhile, Joe is busy working on his latest invention, a state-of-the-art dishwasher. The first time he uses it, it destroys all of Florabell's fine chinaware. Then afterwards Joe reinvented his dishwasher into a washing-machine instead, unfortunately, Rudolph sabotaged his invention. Leading Joe taking his revenge on little brat.

== Cast ==
- Joe DeRita as Joe Priggle the Inventor
- Dorothy Granger as Florabelle Priggle
- Norman Ollestad as Rudolph Priggle
- Symona Boniface as Member of Board of Directors
- Bobby Burns as Minister
- Lew Davis as Member of board of directors
- Vernon Dent as Priggle's Neighbor
- Frank Mills as Wedding Guest
- Frank O'Connor as Member of Board of Directors
- Charles Phillips as Member of board of directors
- Al Thompson as Florabelle father
- Victor Travers as Mr. Collins
- Emil Sitka as Joe's friend
- James C. Morton as Man hit with a horseshoe

== Production notes ==
The Good Bad Egg is a remake of the Andy Clyde short film Knee Action (1937).

DeRita did not think highly of his output at Columbia Pictures, once commenting, "My comedy in those scripts was limited to getting hit on the head with something, then going over to my screen wife to say, 'Honey, don't leave me!' For this kind of comedy material, you could have gotten a busboy to do it and it would have been just as funny."
