= Three Jacks and a Beanstalk =

Three Jacks and a Beanstalk may refer to:

- Three Jacks and a Beanstalk, an episode of The New Three Stooges
- Three Jacks and a Beanstalk, an episode of Rugrats
