= Hal Smith (actor) =

American actor (1916–1994)

- Smith as Otis Campbell in The Andy Griffith Show in the 1960s
- Born: Harold John Smith; August 24, 1916; Petoskey, Michigan, U.S.
- Died: January 28, 1994 (aged 77); Santa Monica, California, U.S.
- Burial place: Woodlawn Memorial Cemetery, Santa Monica
- Occupation: Actor
- Years active: 1946–1994
- Spouses: Vivian Marie Angstadt (m. 1938, divorced) Louise C. Smith (m. 1947; died 1992)
- Children: 1
- Military career
- Allegiance: United States
- Branch: United States Army Air Forces
- Service years: 1943–1946
- Rank: Sergeant
- Unit: Special Services
- Conflicts: World War II: Pacific Theater
- Awards: American Campaign Medal; Asiatic–Pacific Campaign Medal; World War II Victory Medal; Philippine Liberation Medal

Harold John Smith (August 24, 1916 – January 28, 1994) was an American actor. He is credited in over 300 film and television productions, and was best known for his role as Otis Campbell, the town drunk on CBS's The Andy Griffith Show, and for voicing Owl in four of the five Winnie the Pooh shorts (the character is absent in Winnie the Pooh and Tigger Too). Smith also replaced voice actor Sterling Holloway as the title character Winnie the Pooh in the last two shorts, Winnie the Pooh Discovers the Seasons and Winnie the Pooh and a Day for Eeyore, and in the television series Welcome to Pooh Corner. He was the voice of Goofy from 1967 to 1983, did a cameo in The Apartment as a drunken Santa Claus, and provided the voice of Goliath in the TV series Davey and Goliath from 1961 to 1965.

== Early life ==
Harold John Smith was born on August 24, 1916, in Petoskey, Michigan to Jay D. Smith and Emma Smith (nee Ploof). He was the third of four children with two older sisters—Kathleen and Bernadeen—and one younger brother named Glenford, who was called "Glen". His family moved to Wilmington, North Carolina when he was a child before settling in Massena, New York. After graduation from high school, in Massena, New York, Smith worked from 1936 to 1943 as a DJ and voice talent for WIBX Radio in Utica, New York.

Being an avid flyer, Smith enlisted in the United States Army Air Forces in 1943 and was stationed in the Philippines with the Army's Special Services Division. While in Manila, he was made assistant manager of the enlisted men's club at the Far East Air Force (FEAF) headquarters. As such, he was responsible for planning and directing shows for the entertainment of his fellow troops. His own performing skills were utilized as well in a show titled Strictly from Hunger. He was discharged from the service in 1946 as a Sergeant and was awarded the American Campaign Medal, the Asiatic–Pacific Campaign Medal, the World War II Victory Medal and the Philippine Liberation Medal.

== Career ==
=== Early roles ===
After the war, he traveled to Hollywood in 1946 to pursue a career as an actor, he made his acting debut in the feature film, Stars Over Texas as Peddler Tucker. He would later appear in many television series throughout his later career, such as I Married Joan, Fury, The People's Choice, The Texan, Rescue 8, Dennis the Menace, The Adventures of Ozzie and Harriet, The Donna Reed Show, National Velvet and The Red Skelton Show.

=== The Andy Griffith Show ===
Smith's best-remembered on-screen character was Otis Campbell, the town drunk on The Andy Griffith Show, during most of the series' run from 1960 to 1967. When intoxicated, he would often comically let himself into his regular jail cell—using the key which was stored within reach of the two comfortable jail rooms— and "sleep off" the effects of alcohol. Deputy Barney Fife would often become irritated with Otis and would attempt to either sober him up or rehabilitate him in several episodes.

Hal Smith was the opposite of his character. According to longtime friends Andy Griffith and Don Knotts, he did not drink in real life. Smith, however, in a 1964 interview with his hometown paper, said he was a “social drinker.” The Otis character stopped appearing in the sitcom towards the end of the series because of sponsor concerns regarding the comic portrayal of excessive drinking. Smith appeared as Calver Weems in the Don Knotts comedy The Ghost and Mr. Chicken (1966), playing essentially the same town drunk character.

Smith would play Otis one more time in the television movie Return to Mayberry (1986). In the television movie, Otis is the town's ice cream truck driver and is reported to have been "sober for years.” Smith later used his Otis Campbell character in commercial spots for the Mothers Against Drunk Driving organization, and he appeared as Otis in Alan Jackson's music video "Don't Rock the Juke Box.”

=== Other performances ===
In 1957, Smith played Rollin Daggett in the role of a newspaper man in the early days of Mark Twain in the "Fifteen Paces to Fame" episode of Death Valley Days. He made at least one appearance in the TV series Perry Mason, the episode titled "The Case of the Treacherous Toupee", (season 4, episode 1), in 1960. He had a small role as a restaurant manager in the 10/01/1960 Leave It to Beaver episode "Beaver Won't Eat". Smith had a cameo role as the Mayor of Boracho in The Great Race in 1965. He played the industrialist Hans Spear on CBS's sitcom Hogan's Heroes ("The Swing Shift", season 2, episode 21).

He portrayed King Theseus of Rhodes in The Three Stooges Meet Hercules (1965) and later provided various voices for the cartoon series The New 3 Stooges.

In 1967, he played John Wilson in the 1967 episode "The Man Who Didn't Want Gold" of the syndicated Western series Death Valley Days and Mr. Weber in The Lucy Show.

In 1969, Smith had a cameo role as a drunk driver in the Adam-12 episode "Log 51: A Jumper – Code Two". Also in 1969, he appeared in the Petticoat Junction episode "The Great Race". He played Jug Gunderson, a moonshiner that helped the Cannonball train win the aforementioned race. Though his character was never seen drinking or drunk, by the end of the episode, he makes an oath to himself to stop drinking and reform.

In the mid-1960s, Smith also had a morning children's show on the Los Angeles television station KHJ called The Pancake Man, sponsored by the International House of Pancakes (IHOP) restaurant chain. He reprised the role of the Pancake Man as "Kartoon King" in the 1971 episode of The Brady Bunch, titled "The Winner". He also played Mother Goose in the X-rated animated feature film Once Upon a Girl in 1976. He appeared in two episodes of the Odd Couple the early 1970s

=== Voice acting ===
Smith also worked extensively as a voice actor in animated films and television series. His first voice credit was as "Pepe", a boxing rooster, in Walter Lantz's cartoon "The Bongo Punch" in 1957. Beginning in the late 1950s with such shows as The Huckleberry Hound Show and Quick Draw McGraw, Smith became one of the most prolific voice actors in Hollywood, eventually working with most of the major studios and production companies, such as Hanna-Barbera, Walt Disney, Warner Bros., the Mirisch Corporation, and Sid and Marty Krofft, with voice roles on such series as The Flintstones in which he mostly did the voices of Texas millionaires such as Fred's rich uncle Tex, Pink Panther, The Many Adventures of Winnie the Pooh, Mickey Mouse, Yogi Bear and Looney Tunes.

In 1962, he voiced Taurus, the Scots-accented mechanic of the spaceship Starduster for the series Space Angel. According to the book: Space Patrol, missions of daring in the name of early television, "It's rumored that Gene Roddenberry was a huge fan of the show and patterned Star Trek's engineer, Mr. Scott, after McCloud's Scottish sidekick, Taurus". He also did voices for the Hong Kong Phooey series. In 1977, he was the voice of Grandpa Josiah in the cartoon special, Halloween Is Grinch Night. That same year, he began voicing the Disney character Winnie the Pooh, replacing Sterling Holloway, who had provided the voice of the character for many years, beginning with the Disney Read-Along adaptation of Winnie the Pooh and Tigger Too. He was also very active with doing voices in 1980s; he was Sludge in The Smurfs, Goofy in Mickey's Christmas Carol, in Disney's DuckTales he did the voices of Scrooge McDuck's rival Flintheart Glomgold and the absent-minded scientist Gyro Gearloose and in Frog and Toad are Friends and Frog and Toad Together he also did the voice of Toad.

Smith also voiced the Disney cartoon character Goofy after Pinto Colvig died in 1967 and would voice him up until Mickey's Christmas Carol in 1983. Additionally, he provided the voice of Owl in the two original Winnie the Pooh featurettes (Winnie the Pooh and the Honey Tree and Winnie the Pooh and the Blustery Day) and The Many Adventures of Winnie the Pooh in 1977. In the 1960s, he was one of the most sought after voice actors in Hollywood. From 1959 till 1975, he provided the voices for Goliath, Davey's dad and many other characters in Davey and Goliath. From 1960 to 1961, he was the voice of Elmer Fudd after Arthur Q. Bryan died. In 1963, he voiced Dr. Todd Goodheart, Belly Laguna, and Dr. Von Upp in The Funny Company cartoon series. From 1964 to 1966, he was the voice of Yappee in the Hanna-Barbera cartoon shorts Yippee, Yappee and Yahooey. He was also the voice of Cosgoode Creeps, Asa Shanks, the Farmer and Mr. Greenway, on Scooby-Doo, Where are You!.

In 1981, he reprised his role as Owl and Winnie the Pooh in the short Winnie the Pooh Discovers the Seasons. He then voiced the two characters in Winnie the Pooh and a Day for Eeyore in 1983, as well as Disney Channel's television series Welcome to Pooh Corner. On the television series The New Adventures of Winnie the Pooh in 1988, Jim Cummings took over as Pooh while Smith continued playing Owl. The two voice actors sometimes rotated the voice of Winnie the Pooh. In 1991, Smith provided the voice of Philippe the Horse in the Disney film Beauty and the Beast before his death in 1994.

In 1985, Hal voiced Norman Harper, a sick father of wife Jennifer Walters (voiced by D.J. Harner), in a radio drama entitled "House Guest". It aired on the Focus on the Family daily broadcast on November 23 (the day before Thanksgiving) of that year. He went to voice other roles for other Focus audio presentations, and starting in 1987, Smith was the voice of the main character John Avery Whittaker on Focus on the Family's longest-running radio drama Adventures in Odyssey, which debuted that year. He was responsible for much of the cast joining the show after he signed on (including Katie Leigh, Will Ryan, Walker Edmiston, Earl Boen, Dave Madden and others), and he continued recording episodes until a few weeks before his death, even while his health deteriorated. In an Andy Griffith Fan Interview, published after he died, Smith said that Adventures in Odyssey was one of the most gratifying things he had ever done in his life. Additionally, he voiced dozens of other characters during the 253 episodes in which he participated. His role of Whit was later filled by Paul Herlinger in 1996, Andre Stojka in 2009, and Phil Crowley in 2026.

Hal voiced Joe McGee in "The Old Man and the Sea Duck" episode of TaleSpin.

Smith was also very active working in television commercials as various characters. He provided on-screen promotion for 3 Musketeers, United Van Lines, Hickory Farms, Toyota, Green Giant, General Mills, Mattel, Kellogg's, Pizza Hut, Chicken of the Sea, Ivory soap, Doctor Ross Dog Food, Pioneer Chicken, Bell Telephone Company, Coca-Cola, Chef Boyardee and hundreds of other advertising sponsors.

== Personal life ==
Smith was married twice; he first married Vivian Marie Angstadt in 1938, but they later divorced. He married his second wife Louise C. Smith in 1947; they remained married until her death in 1992. They had a son named Terry Jay Smith (1950 - 1998).

== Death ==
After his wife died in 1992, Smith's own health began to deteriorate rapidly. On January 28, 1994, at the age of 77, Smith died from an apparent heart attack. Don Pitts, his longtime agent, said that Smith died at his home in Santa Monica, California, while he was listening to a nightly drama hour on radio.

== Filmography ==
=== Live-action ===
==== Film ====
Year	Title	Role	Notes
1946	Stars Over Texas	Peddler Tucker	
1950	The Milkman	Oswald	Uncredited
1951	Week-End with Father	TV Master of Ceremonies	Uncredited
1951	Ma and Pa Kettle at the Fair		Uncredited
1952	You for Me	Malcolm	Uncredited
1952	O. Henry's Full House	Dandy	(segment "The Last Leaf"), Uncredited
1953	Confidentially Connie	Townsman	Uncredited
1953	Francis Covers the Big Town	Vance	Uncredited
1953	Walking My Baby Back Home	Mr. Ross	Uncredited
1954	Ricochet Romance	Cook	Uncredited
1955	Santa Fe Passage	Bartender	Uncredited
1955	There's Always Tomorrow	Bartender	
1957	The Unholy Wife	Doctor at Rodeo	Uncredited
1957	Pawnee	Bartender	Uncredited
1957	Eighteen and Anxious	Abortionist	
1958	The High Cost of Loving	Woods, Middle Manager	Uncredited
1958	Hot Car Girl	Lou, Soda Bar Owner	
1959	Steve Canyon	Clerk	Episode: "The Sergeant"
1960	The Apartment	Man in Santa Claus Suit	Uncredited
1960	The Miracle of the White Reindeer	Santa Claus	
1962	The Three Stooges Meet Hercules	King Theseus of Rhodes	
1962	The Couch	Pitchman	Uncredited
1963	Son of Flubber	Bartender	Uncredited
1963	Critic's Choice	Drunk	Uncredited
1964	Dear Heart	Stubby	Uncredited
1965	The Great Race	Mayor of Borracho	
1966	The Ghost and Mr. Chicken	Calver Weems	Uncredited
1971	The Million Dollar Duck	Courthouse Guard	
1973	Oklahoma Crude	C.R. Miller	
1976	Once Upon a Girl	Mother Goose	Due to an X rating by the MPAA, Smith and Frank Welker are credited using a pseudonym.
1977	The Hazing	Ice Man	
1988	18 Again!	Irv	

==== Television ====
Year	Title	Role	Notes
1952–1967	Death Valley Days	Various roles	9 episodes
1953–1963	The Adventures of Ozzie and Harriet	Various roles	27 episodes
1956	The Life and Legend of Wyatt Earp	Bartender	Episode: "The Assassins"
1957–1961	Have Gun – Will Travel	Various roles	4 episodes
1958	Tombstone Territory	Whitey Beck	Episode "The Tin Gunman"
1959	Bonanza	Durwood Watkyns	Episode: "The Magnificent Adah"
1959	Peter Gunn	Various roles	3 episodes
1960	Gunsmoke	Mr. Dobie (Hotel Manager)	Episode: "Old Flame"
1960	Route 66	Drunk	Episode: "Strengthening Angels"
1960	Leave It To Beaver	Restaurant Manager	Episode: "Beaver Won't Eat"
1960–1962	Perry Mason	Moulage Man / Supper Club Owner	Episodes: "The Case of the Treacherous Toupee", "Case of the Shapely Shadow"
1960–1966	The Andy Griffith Show	Otis Campbell	32 episodes
1961	Hazel	Announcer	Episode: "Hazel and the Playground"
1962	Wagon Train	Carl Grant	Episode: "The Daniel Clay Story"
1963	The Alfred Hitchcock Hour	Tompy Dill	Season 2 Episode 4: "You'll Be the Death of Me"
1965	The Addams Family	Judge Harvey Saunders	Episode: "The Addams Family in Court"
1965–1969	Petticoat Junction	Jug Gunderson / Ben Miller / Mr. Richardson	3 episodes
1967	Get Smart	Restaurant Patron	Episode: "The Mysterious Dr. T"
1967	Off to See the Wizard	Hotel Desk Clerk	Episode: "Rhino"
1967	The Man from U.N.C.L.E.	Kenneth Quartz	Episode: "The Matterhorn Affair"
1967	Hogan's Heroes	Hans Spear	Episode: "The Swing Shift"
1969	Green Acres	Horace Colby	Season 5, Episode 8: “The Youth Center”
1969	Mod Squad	Jeweler	Episode: "My Name Is Manolete"
1969	Gomer Pyle, U.S.M.C.	Harry Hostelman	Unknown episodes
1969	Adam-12	Edward J Brown / Drunk Driver	Season 1 episode 19
1969–1970	The Doris Day Show	Merle / Mr. Peavy / The Drunk	4 episodes
1969–1971	The Brady Bunch	Kartoon King / Santa Claus	Episodes: "The Voice of Christmas" & "The Winner"
1971	Green Acres	Sheriff	Episode: "Star Witness"
1972	Getting Away from It All	Jeb	ABC Movie of the Week
1973	The Streets of San Francisco	Johnny Dolan	Episode: "Trail of the Sepent"
1974	Barnaby Jones	Leon	Episode: Foul Play
1975	Ellery Queen	Coroner Will Bailey	Episode: The Adventure of the Chinese Dog
1979	The Hollywood Squares	Guest Appearance	Episode: "8-20-1979"
1980–1984	The Dukes of Hazzard	Henry Flatt / Pop Durham	Episodes: "R.I.P. Henry Flatt and Undercover Dukes Part Two"
1982	Little House on the Prairie	Trumble	Episode: "He Was Only Twelve : Part 1"
1982	Fantasy Island	Otis McAllister / Mr. Quarry	Episodes: "Daddy's Little Girl/The Whistle" & "The Kleptomaniac/Thank God, I'm a Country Girl"
1985	The Disney Family Album	Himself	Episode: "Voice Actors"
1985–1986	Night Court	Bum / Man in Art Gallery	2 episodes, "The Gypsy" (Season 2) and "Dan's Escort" (Season 3)
1986	Return to Mayberry	Otis Campbell	TV movie
1987	Highway to Heaven	Martin	Episode: "All That Glitters"
1987	The Mother Goose Video Treasury	Old King Cole	Video

=== Voice roles ===
==== Film ====
Year	Title	Role	Notes
1957	The Bongo Punch	Pepe Chickeeto / Ring Announcer	Walter Lantz theatrical short
1960	Dog Gone People	Elmer Fudd	Merrie Melodies theatrical short, Uncredited
1961	Count Down Clown	Additional voices	Loopy De Loop theatrical short
1961	Happy Go Loopy	Additional voices	Loopy De Loop theatrical short
1961	What's My Lion?	Elmer Fudd	Looney Tunes theatrical short
1964	Hey There, It's Yogi Bear!	Corn Pone / Moose	
1965	Horse Shoo	Additional voices	Loopy De Loop theatrical short
1966	Winnie the Pooh and the Honey Tree	Owl	
1967	The Jungle Book	Slob Elephant / Monkey	Uncredited
1968	The Inspector	Vampire Scientist / Charlie	2 theatrical shorts
1968	Winnie the Pooh and the Blustery Day	Owl	
1970	Shinbone Alley	Freddie the Rat / Prissy Cat	
1970	Santa and the Three Bears	Uncle Hal / Santa / Mr. Ranger	
1972	The Getaway	Various radio announcers	Uncredited
1973	Fantastic Planet	Master Sinh / Distrustful Om	English dub
1976	Buffalo Rider	Old Buffalo Hunter's voice	
1977	The Many Adventures of Winnie the Pooh	Owl	Archive footage
1981	Winnie the Pooh Discovers the Seasons	Winnie the Pooh / Owl	
1983	Winnie the Pooh and a Day for Eeyore	Winnie the Pooh / Owl	
1983	Mickey's Christmas Carol	Goofy played as Jacob Marley's ghost Ratty	
1984	Nausicaä of the Valley of the Wind	Lord Yupa / Narrator / Axel / Additional Voices	1985 English dub
1984	Donald's Fire Survival Plan	Common Sense	1984 version
1984	Katy Caterpillar	Clyde	English dub
1985	Here Come the Littles	Uncle Augustus	
1985	Frog and Toad Are Friends	Toad	
1986	The Adventures of the American Rabbit	Mentor / Marvin / Too Loose	
1986	An American Tail	Moe	
1987	Star Quest	Dr. Moss / Space Force Trainer / Professor Ronta / Prime-Minister Scorco / Noble C / Additional Voices	1987 English dub
1987	Frog and Toad Together	Toad	
1991	Beauty and the Beast	Philippe	

==== Television ====
Year	Title	Role	Notes
1959–1960	The Huckleberry Hound Show	Lion / Newscaster / Piccadilly Dilly, Narrator, Eddie / Additional voices	5 episodes
1959–1960	The Quick Draw McGraw Show	Narrator / Narrator, Naughty Pine, Ronald Rugged / Mr. Bringling / Additional voices	9 episodes
1960	The Bugs Bunny Show	Additional voices	Unknown episodes
1960–1975	Davey and Goliath	Goliath / John Hansen / Pastor Miller / Johnathan Reed / Additional voices	73 episodes
1960–1965	The Flintstones	Uncle Tex / Santa Claus / Additional voices	36 episodes
1961	The Yogi Bear Show	Additional voices	Unknown episodes
1962	The Jetsons	Additional voices	Episode: "The Flying Suit"
1962–1964	Space Angel	Gunner, Engineer Taurus, Narrator, Professor Mace, Various others	49 episodes
1963	Rod Rocket	Professor Argus	Unknown episodes
1963	The Funny Company	Dr. Todd Goodheart / Belly Laguna / Dr. Von Upp	8 episodes
1964	The Magilla Gorilla Show	Helicopter Rescuer / Additional voices	Episode: "Motorcycle Magilla"
1964	The Famous Adventures of Mr. Magoo	Additional voices	Unknown episodes
1964–1966	Yippee, Yappee and Yahooey	Yappee / The King	Unknown episodes
1965	The New 3 Stooges	Cowboy / Lumberjack Boss / Old Man	139 episodes
1966	The Road Runner Show	Various characters	Unknown episodes
1966	A Laurel and Hardy Cartoon	Various characters	20 episodes
1966	Frankenstein Jr. and The Impossibles	Coil Man	18 episodes
1967	The Abbott and Costello Cartoon Show	Additional voices	Unknown episodes
1967–1969	Gumby	Prickle / Dr. Zveegee / Rich Man / Additional voices	36 episodes
1968	The New Adventures of Huckleberry Finn	Additional voices	Unknown episodes
1968	The Bugs Bunny/Road Runner Hour	Elmer Fudd / Additional voices	Unknown episodes
1969	The Pink Panther Show	Additional voices	Unknown episodes
1969–1970	Scooby Doo, Where Are You!	Ghost of Captain Cutler / Big Ben / Farmer / Cosgood Creeps / Green Ghosts Mr. Greenway / Headless Specter / Asa Shanks / Phony Phantom / Balloon Ghost / Additional voices	25 episodes
1970–1989	Walt Disney's Wonderful World of Color	Carnival Barker / Ed Haskins / Gyro Gearloose / Additional voices	10 episodes
1971	Help!... It's the Hair Bear Bunch!	Additional voices	Unknown episodes
1972	A Christmas Story	Additional voices	TV special
1972	Wait Till Your Father Gets Home	Additional voices	Episode: "The New Car"
1972	The ABC Saturday Superstar Movie	Muscles / Boris / Third Cyclone / Donkey	Episodes: "The Adventures of Robin Hoodnik", "Tabitha and Adam and the Clown Family"
1972	The Thanksgiving That Almost Wasn't	Additional voices	TV special
1972	The Roman Holidays	Mr. Tycoonis	Unknown episodes
1973	Yogi's Gang	Additional voices	3 episodes
1973–1978	ABC Afterschool Specials	Uncle Carl (on-camera) / Professor Latouche	Episodes: "The Incredible, Indelible, Magical Physical, Mystery Trip", "Michel's Mixed-Up Musical Bird"
1974	Hong Kong Phooey	Additional voices	Unknown episodes
1975	The Hoober-Bloob Highway	Narrator	TV special
1975	The Tom & Jerry Show	Black Barney	Episode: "No Bones About It / An Ill Wind / Beach Bully"
1976	The Pink Panther Laugh and a Half Hour and a Half Show	Various characters	Unknown episodes
1977	A Flintstone Christmas	Santa Claus / Elevator Operator	TV movie
1977	Halloween Is Grinch Night	Josiah	TV special
1977	What's New, Mr. Magoo?	Additional voices	Unknown episodes
1977–1980	Captain Caveman and the Teen Angels	Snow Wolf / Mr. Holiday / Additional voices	39 episodes
1978	The All New Pink Panther Show	Additional voices	Unknown episodes
1978	The Fantastic Four	Additional voices	13 episodes
1978	The Small One	Auctioneer	Short film
1978	Yogi's Space Race	Additional voices	7 episodes
1978	The Scooby Doo Show	Chevaux Le Beau / Mr. Taylor / Additional voices	Episode: The Beast is Awake in Bottomless Lake
1979	The Plastic Man Comedy/Adventure Show	Doctor Honctoff	16 episodes
1979	Casper's First Christmas	Santa Claus	TV special
1979	Gulliver's Travels	Additional voices	TV special
1979	Casper's Halloween Special	Mr. Duncan / Skull	
1980	Yogi's First Christmas	Otto the Chef / Santa Claus	TV movie
1980	Pontoffel Pock, Where Are You?	Good Fairy-in-Chief / Flooglehorn Player / Groogen Dairywoman / Judge Hobart Heinrich Hinklefoos / Sultan / Various Fairies	TV special
1981	Trollkins	Additional Voices	13 episodes
1981	The Kwicky Koala Show	Additional Voices	Unknown episodes
1981	No Man's Valley	George / Louis	TV special
1981	The All-New Popeye Hour	Col. Crumb	3 episodes
1982	Jokebook	Additional voices	Unknown episodes
1982	Richie Rich	Additional voices	1 episode
1982	Here Comes Garfield	Reba/Skinny	TV special
1982	Yogi Bear's All Star Comedy Christmas Caper	J. Wellington Jones / Sergeant / Zookeeper	TV special
1982–1983	Shirt Tales	Additional voices	23 episodes
1982–1987	The Smurfs	Additional voices	17 episodes
1983	Christmas at Pooh Corner	Pooh / Owl	TV special
1983	Pooh Corner Thanksgiving	Pooh / Owl	TV special
1983	The Dukes	Additional voices	Unknown episodes
1983	The New Scooby and Scrappy-Doo Show	Sidney Gaspar / Mummy / Additional voices	Episode: Where's Scooby Doo?
1983–1986	Welcome to Pooh Corner	Winnie the Pooh / Owl	120 episodes
1984	Christmas Is For Sharing	Winnie the Pooh / Owl	TV special
1984	Because It's Halloween	Winnie the Pooh / Owl	TV special
1984	Pooh's Funny Valentine's Day	Winnie the Pooh / Owl	TV special
1984	Garfield in the Rough	Dicky Beaver	TV special
1984	The New Scooby-Doo Mysteries	Harriet Mullins's associate / Additional voices	Episode: "Ghosts of the Ancient Astronauts"
1984	Pole Position	Additional voices	
1984	The Cabbage Patch Kids' First Christmas	Colonel Casey	
1984	Strong Kids, Safe Kids	Yogi Bear / Dino / Ghost	Video Documentary Short
1985	Dumbo's Circus	Fair Dinkum / Additional voices	Episode: "Uncle Lattimer Says "Merci""
1985	Too Smart for Strangers	Winnie the Pooh / Owl	
1986	Garfield in Paradise	Off Camera Voice	TV special
1986	Fuzzbucket	Fuzzbucket	TV movie
1986	Pooh's Great School Bus Adventure	Winnie the Pooh / Owl	TV special
1986–1989	Sesame Street	Elephant / Bear / Ant	Episodes: "Episode #18.9 & Episode #21.5"
1987	DuckTales: The Treasure of the Golden Suns	Gyro Gearloose / Flintheart Glomgold	TV movie
1987–1990	DuckTales	Gyro Gearloose / Flintheart Glomgold / Dr. Glockenspiel / Adult Huey / Adult Dewey / Adult Louie	47 episodes
1988	Garfield: His 9 Lives	George Frideric Handel	TV special
1988	The New Yogi Bear Show	Additional voices	4 episodes
1988–1989	This Is America, Charlie Brown	Mr. Wilson / John Muir	Episodes: "The Birth of the Constitution", "The Smithsonian and the Presidency"
1988–1990	Adventures of the Gummi Bears	Nogum / Abbot Costello	Episodes: "A Knight to Remember/Gummies Just Want to Have Fun & Friar Tum"
1988–1991	The New Adventures of Winnie the Pooh	Owl	24 episodes
1989	Responsible Persons	Winnie the Pooh / Owl	TV special
1989	One and Only You	Winnie the Pooh / Owl	TV special
1990	Midnight Patrol: Adventures in the Dream Zone	Additional voices	13 episodes
1990	TaleSpin	Joe Magee	Episode: The Old Man and the Sea Duck
1991	Yo Yogi!	Blabber Mouse	9 episodes
1991	Darkwing Duck	Saint Peter	Episode: "Dead Duck"
1992	The Little Mermaid	Villain #1	Episode: "Stormy"
1992	Rugrats	Additional voices	Episode: "The Santa Experience"
1993	The Town Santa Forgot	Santa Claus	TV special
1993	Bonkers	Santa Claus	Episode: "Miracle at the 34th Precinct"

==== Video games ====
Year	Title	Role	Notes
1991	Dragon's Lair II: Time Warp	Mordroc, Cheshire Cat, Card Soldiers, Time Machine (Mordroc's brother), Dirk's mother-in-law	
1994	Zelda's Adventure	Gaspra	Released posthumously

==== Radio ====
Year	Title	Role	Notes
1985	House Guest (Focus on the Family Daily Broadcast)	Norman Harper	1 episode
1986	Gone Fishing (Focus on the Family Daily Broadcast)	Bert Foster	1 episode
1987	Family Portraits (Adventures in Odyssey Pilot Series)	John Avery Whittaker	12 episodes
1987–1994	Adventures in Odyssey	John Avery Whittaker and Additional Voices	253 episodes
