= The New 3 Stooges =

American animated television series

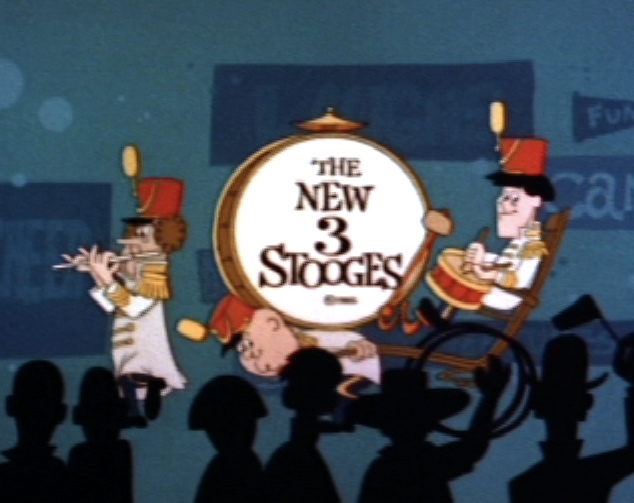
- Genre: Comedy; Slapstick
- Created by: Norman Maurer; Dick Brown
- Based on: The Three Stooges
- Written by: Eddie Bernds
- Story by: Pat Kearin; Jack Kinney; Cecil Beard; Art Diamond; David Detiege; Lee Orgel; Homer Brightman; Nick George; Barbara Chain; Warren Tufts; Jack Miller; Sam Cornell
- Directed by: Eddie Bernds; Sam Cornell; David Detiege; Eddie Rehberg
- Starring: Moe Howard; Larry Fine; Joe DeRita; Emil Sitka; Margaret Kerry; Harold Brauer; Jeffrey Scott; Michael Maurer; Eric Lamond; Cary Brown; Tina Brown; Eileen Brown
- Voices of: Moe Howard; Larry Fine; Joe DeRita; Margaret Kerry; Hal Smith; Paul Frees; Johnny Coons
- Music by: Gordon Zahler; Paul Horn
- Country of origin: United States
- Original language: English
- No. of seasons: 1
- No. of episodes: 40 (live-action); 156 (animated cartoon)

Production
- Executive producer: Norman Maurer
- Producers: Norman Maurer; Lee Orgel
- Animators: Kay Wright; Bob Maxfield; Chic Otterstrom
- Editors: William J. Faris; George Probert
- Camera setup: Jerry Smith; Edwin Gillette
- Running time: 30:00
- Production companies: Normandy Productions; Cambria Studios; Heritage Productions

Original release
- Network: Syndication
- Release: October 1965 – September 1966

Related
- The Three Stooges (1934–1959); The Robonic Stooges (1977–1978)

The New 3 Stooges is an American animated television series that ran during the 1965–66 television season starring the Three Stooges. The show follows the trio's antics both in live-action and animated segments. The cast consisted of Moe Howard, Larry Fine and Joe DeRita (as Curly-Joe), with actor and close friend Emil Sitka co-starring, as well as Margaret Kerry. The stories took place in varied settings, including Newport Beach and sailing as buccaneers on the Spanish Main.

== Production ==
Forty-one live-action sequences were executively overseen by cartoonist Norman Maurer, son-in-law of Moe Howard, serving as their film agent during this period. Additionally, Edward Bernds, who directed the team at Columbia Pictures from 1945 to 1952 (predominantly during the Shemp Howard era), was enlisted to both script and direct the series. Emil Sitka, a familiar figure from numerous Stooges comedies, was slated to feature in these wraparound segments, assuming the role of a straight man to the Stooges.

Under the auspices of Cambria Studios, 156 short Stooge cartoons were produced, under the supervision of Lee Orgel. Notably, four cartoons were meticulously crafted to thematically align with each of the 40 live-action Stooge opening and closing sequences. Consequently, a single live-action segment could seamlessly transition as a wraparound for four distinct cartoons. However, this format posed a challenge for viewers, as articulated by Joe DeRita:

There were 156 cartoons and we made only 40 live-action segments. So after they ran the whole 40, they'd just start over by using these same introductions on new cartoons. This turned out to be misleading because viewers would say, "Oh, I've seen this one before", and they'd turn off the television. They didn't know it was a new cartoon.

The animated drawing of the trio running in silhouette form was used many times at the end of several episodes, due to its limited animation.

The majority of the cartoons culminated with the trio fleeing into the horizon following inadvertent chaos at their various employments and ensuing predicaments. These cartoons diverged from Cambria's customary employment of Syncro-Vox, a patented technique involving filmed footage of voice actors' mouths over still frames. The inaugural cartoon, "That Little Old Bomb Maker", featured a distinctive live-action wraparound that remained exclusive to that particular cartoon.

A number of the cartoons featured recurring characters, such as Badman, a juvenile antagonist sporting a Batman-esque attire, who paradoxically is a benevolent 5-year-old boy. Another recurring character was the western outlaw named Getoutoftownbysundown Brown.

To preclude potential licensing entanglements, Cambria abstained from employing any of the Stooges' theme songs, including "Three Blind Mice" and "Listen to the Mockingbird", despite their lapse into the public domain. Similarly, the on-screen titling employed a numeral "3" to circumvent potential infringement on any trademark held by Columbia Pictures regarding the name "The Three Stooges".

The New 3 Stooges represented a subsequent endeavor at animating the trio. In the late 1950s, Norman Maurer sought to market "Stooge Time", a hybrid live-action/rotoscope animation half-hour series for television. In 1960, Maurer and the Stooges filmed a pilot for The Three Stooges Scrapbook, a half-hour series incorporating a five-minute Stooge cartoon. The Stooges later revisited animated form for Hanna-Barbera, contributing to two episodes of The New Scooby-Doo Movies (1972–74) and the series The Robonic Stooges (1977–78), the latter developed posthumously following the demise of both Moe Howard and Larry Fine.

== Lawsuit ==
The series posed significant financial challenges for the Stooges. Under the terms of their contract, Cambria Studios' distributor was obliged to provide quarterly financial statements to the trio, ensuring transparency regarding the show's earnings. However, Norman Maurer recalled receiving only one or two statements throughout a span of five years, precipitating legal action. In the ensuing lawsuit, the presiding judge, lacking substantial familiarity with the intricacies of the film and television industry, ruled in favor of Cambria.

The Stooges pursued an appeal in 1975, ultimately securing a favorable verdict. Nonetheless, this legal triumph failed to rectify the distributor's persistent failure to provide requisite profit statements to Normandy Productions. By the time the litigation concluded, both Moe and Larry had died.

== Episodes ==
List of live-action wraparounds and cartoons for The New 3 Stooges television series (1965–1966):

=== Live-action wraparounds ===
- Soldiers
- Lost
- Campers
- Bakers
- Zookeepers
- Flat Tire
- Fan Belt
- Fishermen
- Dentist (remake of The Tooth Will Out (1951))
- Janitors
- Artists
- Decorators (remake of A Bird in the Head (1946)/Jerks of All Trades (1949))
- Golfers (remake of Three Little Beers (1935))
- Hunters
- Weighing In
- Telegram
- Sunken Treasure
- Outdoor Breakfast
- Setting Up Camp
- Rare Bird
- Caretakers
- Seasick Joe
- Magicians
- Electricians (remake of They Stooge to Conga (1943))
- Salesmen
- Barbers
- Inheritance
- Sweepstakes Ticket
- Sunbathers
- Doctors
- Buried Treasure
- Waiters
- Athletes
- Shipmates
- High Voltage (remake of Monkey Businessmen (1946))
- Pilots
- Sharpshooter
- Piemakers
- Prospectors
- Turkey Stuffers
- Melodrama

=== Cartoons ===
- A001 That Little Old Bomb Maker
- A002 Woodsman Bear That Tree
- A003 Let's Shoot the Player Piano Player
- A004 Dentist the Menace (remake of The Tooth Will Out (1951))
- A005 Safari So Good
- A006 Thimk or Thwim
- A007 There Auto Be a Law
- A008 That Old Shell Game
- A009 Hold That Line
- A010 Flycycle Built for Two
- A011 Dizzy Doodlers
- A012 The Classical Clinker
- A013 Movie Scars
- A014 A Bull for Andamo
- A015 The Tree Nuts
- A016 Tin Horn Dude
- A017 Thru Rain, Sleet and Snow
- A018 Goldriggers of '49
- A019 Ready, Jetset, Go
- A020 Behind the 8 Ball Express
- A021 Stop Dragon Around
- A022 To Kill a Clockingbird
- A023 Who's Lion
- A024 Fowl Weather Friend
- A025 Wash My Line
- A026 Little Cheese Chaser
- A027 The Big Windbag
- A028 Baby Sitters
- A029 Clarence of Arabia
- A030 Three Jacks & a Beanstalk
- A031 That Was the Wreck That Was
- A032 The Three Astronutz
- A033 Peter Panic
- A034 When You Wish Upon a Fish
- A035 Little Past Noon
- A036 Hair of the Bear
- A037 Three Lumps in a Lamp
- A038 Who's for Dessert?
- A039 Watts My Lion
- A040 Which Is Witch
- A041 Suture Self
- A042 The Yolks on You
- A043 Tally Moe with Larry and Joe
- A044 The First in Lion
- A045 The Transylvania Railroad
- A046 What's Mew Pussycat?
- A047 It's a Bad Bad Bad Bad Word
- A048 Bridge on the River Cry
- A049 Hot Shots
- A050 Mel's Angels
- A051 Bee My Honey
- A052 That Dirty Bird
- A053 Stone Age Stooges
- A054 Smoke Gets in Your Skies
- A055 Queen Quong
- A056 Campsight Fright
- A057 Goldibear and the Three Stooges
- A058 The Lyin' Tamer
- A059 The Pen Game
- A060 It's a Small World
- A061 Late for Launch
- A062 Focus in Space
- A063 The Noisy Silent Movie
- A064 Get Out of Town by Sundown Brown
- A065 Table Tennis Tussle
- A066 Phony Express
- A067 Best Test Pilots
- A068 Litter Bear
- A069 A Fishy Tale
- A070 The Unhaunted House
- A071 Aloha Ha Ha
- A072 The Rise and Fall of the Roman Umpire
- A073 Deadbeat Street
- A074 Cotton Pickin' Chicken
- A075 Larry and the Pirates
- A076 Tree Is a Crowd
- A077 Feud for Thought
- A078 Bat and Brawl
- A079 Knight Without End
- A080 Up a Tree
- A081 Turnabout Is Bearplay
- A082 Pow Wow Row
- A083 Flat Heads
- A084 No News Is Good News
- A085 Bully for You, Curly
- A086 Tee for Three
- A087 Goofy Gondoliers
- A088 Bearfoot Fishermen
- A089 Washout Below
- A090 The Three Marketeers
- A091 Follo the White Lion
- A092 One Good Burn Deserves Another
- A093 Curly's Bear
- A094 Land Ho, Ho, Ho
- A095 Surfs You Right
- A096 Seven Faces of Timbear
- A097 Bearfoot Bandit
- A098 Nuttin' But the Brave
- A099 Three Good Knights
- A100 Call of the Wile
- A101 Snowbrawl
- A102 Rob 'n' Good
- A103 There's No Mule Like an Old Mule
- A104 Squawk Valley
- A105 Mummies Boys
- A106 The Plumber's Friend
- A107 Rub-a-Dub-Tub
- A108 Under the Bad-Bad Tree
- A109 Hairbrained Barbers
- A110 Waiter Minute
- A111 Souperman
- A112 Abominable Snowman
- A113 Curly in Wonderland
- A114 Stooges in the Woods
- A115 Chimney Sweeps
- A116 The Mad Mail Mission
- A117 Out of Space
- A118 Wizards of Odd
- A119 Three for the Road
- A120 Feudin' Fussin' and Hillbully
- A121 Don't Misbehave Indian Brave
- A122 You Ain't Lion
- A123 Muscle on Your Mind
- A124 Badmen in the Briny
- A125 Furry Fugitive
- A126 How the West Was Once
- A127 Bowling Pinheads
- A128 The Mountain Ear
- A129 Norse West Passage
- A130 Lastest Gun in the West
- A131 Toys Will Be Toys
- A132 First Glass Service
- A133 Strictly for the Birds
- A134 Le' Stooginaires
- A135 The Bear Who Came Out of the Cold
- A136 The Bigger They Are, the Harder They Hit
- A137 Little Red Riding Wolf
- A138 Bell Hop Flops
- A139 Dig That Gopher
- A140 Gagster Dragster
- A141 Just Plane Crazy
- A142 From Bad to Verse
- A143 Droll Weevil
- A144 The Littlest Martian
- A145 The Bear Showoff
- A146 No Money, No Honey
- A147 Get That Snack Shack Off the Track
- A148 Curly's Birthday-a-Go-Go
- A149 The Men from UCLA
- A150 Super Everybody
- A151 Kangaroo Catchers
- A152 No Smoking Aloud
- A153 The Chicken Delivery Boys
- A154 Sno Ball
- A155 Rug-a-Bye Baby
- A156 Dinopoodi

== Home media ==
Several episodes are currently available on VHS and DVD (often in cheap "dollar packages" with the cartoons and live-action sequences being in poor quality) as the series fell into the public domain.

Using the original 16mm acetates, Rhino Entertainment issued a restored version in 2002 of 28 live action segments, and 32 of the cartoons over two volumes. Each volume contains a Spanish audio option, and Volume one has a near 7 minute retrospective interview with Lee Orgel. During it, he mentions only 39 live action segments being produced which added confusion to some claims of there being 40 or 41.

In 2004, EastWest DVD released a slim case volume of episodes. In 2007 and 2008, Mill Creek Entertainment released a number of episodes as part of their Ultimate 150 Cartoon Festival, their Giant 600 Cartoon Collection and their 200 Classic Cartoons – Collector's Edition Label formats.

On October 15, 2013, Image Madacy Entertainment released The New 3 Stooges: Complete Cartoon Collection on DVD in Region 1 making it the first time a complete set was released. The five-disc set features all 156 cartoons and 39 live action sequences on four discs, with the bonus disc being an audio CD by the Stooges which combines tracks from two of their albums.

On October 17, 2017, Mill Creek Entertainment released all 156 cartoons and 40 live action segments as part of The Three Stooges: The Big Box of Nyuks box set.

== Reception ==
The New 3 Stooges was well-received upon initial airings, despite the use of limited animation. However, the Stooges were visibly aged during this time (Moe was 68 and Larry was 63), so the team's patented slapstick routines were subdued in the live-action segments. Orgel later stated that the Stooges' penchant for violence was kept to a minimum due to the concerns of parental groups. In addition, in what would prove to be a bit of foreshadowing to his 1970 stroke that ended his career, Larry's motor skills had become somewhat sluggish, resulting in occasional slurred dialogue. To compensate, most of the comedy being divided between Moe and Curly-Joe, with Larry only chiming in when necessary. In retrospect, this altered comedy dynamic was a throwback to the Stooges' prime years in the 1930s when Curly Howard dominated the team's films and Larry was relegated to an occasional line of dialogue.

The New 3 Stooges lasted for a single season. Its modest success drew the attention of Eddie Sherman, the manager to another classic comedy film star, Bud Abbott, who was in dire financial straits after the death of his partner Lou Costello. Orgel and Sherman developed The Abbott and Costello Cartoon Show for Abbott, who agreed to the series despite Costello's death in 1959 (Stan Irwin would voice the role in his stead) and his own ill health. Sponsor objections led to Cambria not getting to produce the series, which was instead produced by Hanna-Barbera.

Although animated portions of the show were last aired in syndication on WGN-TV in the Chicago area in the early 1980s and 1990s, repackaged, redubbed, new music and distributed at the time by DIC Animation City and Jeffrey Scott Productions, it is occasionally seen on Me-TV. It also aired in Japan on TV Tokyo. They are also seen on the Three Stooges FAST channel airing on various streaming services including DirecTV, Sling TV, and Freevee.

The New 3 Stooges became the only regularly scheduled television series in the Stooges' history. Unlike other film shorts that aired on television like Looney Tunes, Tom and Jerry and Popeye the Sailor, the Stooges' short films never had a regularly scheduled national television program to air in, neither on network nor syndicated; the film shorts, at roughly 20 minutes apiece, were of ideal size to be run as a stand-alone television series in and of themselves. When Columbia/Screen Gems licensed the film library to television beginning in 1958, local stations aired the shorts when they saw fit, either as late-night "filler" or marathon sessions.

== See also ==
- The Three Stooges Scrapbook
- The Robonic Stooges
- The New Scooby-Doo Movies
- Laurel and Hardy
- The Abbott and Costello Cartoon Show
- Hoppity Hooper
