= The Robonic Stooges =

- Second version of the title card.
- Genre: Comedy; Slapstick
- Directed by: Charles A. Nichols; Chris Cuddington
- Voices of: Paul Winchell; Joe Baker; Frank Welker; Ross Martin
- Narrated by: Frank Welker
- Theme music composer: Hoyt Curtin
- Composer: Hoyt Curtin
- Country of origin: United States
- Original language: English
- No. of seasons: 1
- No. of episodes: 16 (32 segments)

Production
- Executive producers: William Hanna; Joseph Barbera
- Producers: Terry Morse, Jr.
- Running time: 8 minutes
- Production company: Hanna-Barbera Productions

Original release
- Network: CBS
- Release: September 10, 1977 – March 18, 1978

Related
- The New 3 Stooges; The Three Stooges; The Skatebirds

The Robonic Stooges is an American Saturday morning animated series featuring the characters of The Three Stooges reimagined in new roles as clumsy crime-fighting cyborg superheroes. It was developed by Norman Maurer and produced by Hanna-Barbera Productions from September 10, 1977, to March 18, 1978, on CBS and contained two segments: The Robonic Stooges and Woofer & Wimper, Dog Detectives.

The Robonic Stooges originally aired as a segment on The Skatebirds from September 10, 1977, to January 21, 1978, on CBS. When CBS canceled The Skatebirds in early 1978, the trio was given their own half-hour timeslot which ran for 16 episodes. This was the second animated series starring the Stooges, following the 1965 series The New 3 Stooges.

In 2021, it was announced The Robonic Stooges would become a comic book series with new stories published by American Mythology Productions. Issue #1 was written by S.A. Check and Jordan Gershowitz with interior art from Philip Murphy and Jorge Pacheco and main cover art by Eric Shanower.

== Overview ==
Moe, Larry and Curly are junkyard-based superheroes who fight crime with their often-malfunctioning bionic powers and are given assignments via film projector from their frustrated boss Agent 000 (pronounced "oh-oh-oh") who runs the Superhero Employment Agency.

Since all of the original Three Stooges had died when production began (Moe Howard and Larry Fine had both died in 1975, Shemp Howard died in 1955 and Curly Howard died in 1952), other voice actors were used to impersonate them, mostly veteran voice actors from other Hanna-Barbera productions. Paul Winchell voiced Moe, Joe Baker voiced Larry, and Frank Welker voiced Curly (Welker had previously used his Curly impression for the titular character in Jabberjaw). Unlike cartoon series produced by Hanna-Barbera in the 1970s, The Robonic Stooges did not contain a laugh track.

This was the second animated adaptation of the Three Stooges, the first being Cambria Studios' The New 3 Stooges in 1965, which used the actual Stooges' voices. Norman Maurer, who was married to Moe Howard's daughter and had acted as the Stooges' agent during their lifetimes, worked on both series. The Stooges had previously appeared in another Hanna Barbera-created series: The New Scooby-Doo Movies (1972), this time as Moe, Larry and Curly Joe. With the deaths of Fine and Howard in 1975, other actors were engaged to voice the roles of Moe and Larry; neither of the surviving "third" Stooges, Joe Besser or Joe DeRita, was asked to participate (even though Besser was working for Hanna-Barbera for other series at the time).

The Robonic Stooges episodes were occasionally seen between shows as interstitial segments on Boomerang.

== Voices ==
- Joe Baker — Larry
- Ross Martin — Agent 000, Blackbeard (in "Bye Bye Blackbeard"), Count von Crankenstein (in "Woo Woo Wolfman")
- Frank Welker — Curly, Narrator, Ludwig Lillyput (in "Flea Fi Fo Fum")
- Paul Winchell — Moe, Mummy/Amazing Bordoni (in "I Want My Mummy"), Professor Octane (in "Don't Fuel with a Fuel")

=== Additional voices ===
- Henry Corden – Hercules (in "On Your Knees, Hercules"), Pierre Le Sly (in "Mutiny on the Mountie")
- Scatman Crothers – King (in "Three Stooges and the Seven Dwarfs")
- Casey Kasem – Atlantean Scientist (in "Rub a Dub Dub, Three Nuts in a Sub")
- John Stephenson – Genie (in "The Eeenie Meanie Genie"), Achilles the Heel (in "On Your Knees, Hercules"), Poodleman (in "Woo Woo Wolfman"), Cardinal Poreleau (in "The Three Nutsketeers")

== Episodes ==
=== The Skatebirds (1977) ===
No.	Title	Original release date
1	"Invasion of the Incredible Giant Chicken"	September 10, 1977
Professor Cluck has invented a super-growth formula which he uses on some chickens in his plan to become President of the World.
2	"Dimwits and Dinosaurs"	September 17, 1977
Dr. Hansenfoot's time machine is stolen by Ug the Pug and he uses it to commit crimes while using prehistoric times as a hideout.
3	"Fish and Drips"	September 24, 1977
Shark Yo Yo has defrosted a gigantic octopus which he uses to rob ships at sea.
4	"Have Saucer Will Travel"	October 1, 1977
The Blobobians have approached Earth and have captured the Robonic Stooges to determine if there is intelligent life on Earth.
5	"I Want My Mummy"	October 8, 1977
A mummy with magical talents has stolen the crown of King Tut-Tut.
6	"The Great Brain Drain"	October 15, 1977
Dr. Crackula has stolen the brain of Dr. Brainly (the smartest man in the world) and then captures Curly to place Dr. Brainly's intelligence into him.
7	"Flea Fi Fo Fum"	October 22, 1977
Ludwig Lillyput uses a miniaturizing formula to shrink nations as part of his revenge on those that ridiculed his ideas.
8	"Frozen Feud"	October 29, 1977
Klondike Mike and his Yeti are stealing Alaska's oil in order to sell it and make Klondike Mike the wealthiest man in the world.
9	"Mother Goose on the Loose"	November 5, 1977
A vacuum cleaner-riding witch named Mother Goose is on the loose and the Robonic Stooges are sent to capture her.
10	"Curly of the Apes"	November 12, 1977
An ivory poacher Tricker Mortis is stealing elephants.
11	"Don't Fuel with a Fool"	November 19, 1977
Professor Octane has created a super-fuel called Zoom Zoom, but does not know what he used to make it since he made it by accident. Unfortunately, Ethel Methel kidnaps Professor Octane and the super-fuel. It is up to the Robonic Stooges to save the Professor, recover the super-fuel, and capture Ethel Methel.
12	"The Eenie Meanie Genie"	November 26, 1977
The Robonic Stooges unknowingly free an evil genie, who then goes on a rampage.
13	"On Your Knees, Hercules"	December 3, 1977
In Ancient Greece, Achilles the Heel uses a special potion to control Hercules in a plot to become king of all Greece.
14	"Rub a Dub Dub, Three Nuts in a Sub"	December 10, 1977
A fish-man scientist from Atlantis has stolen a submarine to add to his collected specimens.
15	"There's No Joy in an Evil Toy"	December 17, 1977
Mr. Toy Ploy is robbing toy stores in order to force people to buy the stolen toys from him.
16	"Three Little Pigheads"	December 24, 1977
Coach Roach and his football team the Croakers are using special shoulder pads to cheat their way to the championships. The Robonic Stooges are sent by Agent 000 to keep the game honorable.

=== The Three Robonic Stooges (1978) ===
No.	Title	Original release date
17	"Bye Bye Blackbeard"	January 28, 1978
In the 17th century, Blackbeard is robbing ships at sea.
18	"The Silliest Show on Earth"	January 28, 1978
The Amazing Bongo Brothers are abducting the circus people that fired them from the circus.
19	"Mutiny on the Mountie"	February 4, 1978
After being thrown out of the Mounties for his pranks, Pierre Le Sly is discrediting the Mounties and it is up to the Robonic Stooges to stop him.
20	"Woo Woo Wolfman"	February 4, 1978
In his scheme to get revenge on the local villagers, Count von Crankenstein plans to transform an ordinary poodle into a wolfman. Unfortunately, an accident merges the two of them into Poodleman.
21	"Burgle Gurgle"	February 11, 1978
Professor Hate is robbing millionaires on their yachts.
22	"Schoolhouse Mouse"	February 11, 1978
Mouse Louse uses his Hypno-Harp to take control of the students at Junior Junior High.
23	"Rip Van Wrinkles"	February 18, 1978
While making a cake for Moe, Curly mistakes a container of sleeping powder for a container of yeast. This causes them to fall asleep until they wake up in their old age in the year 2070 where Agent 000 the III has them stop Dr. Glueco and his glue monster Gloop.
24	"The Three Nutsketeers"	February 18, 1978
In 17th century France, King Fouie the 14th is a puppet in Cardinal Poreleau's plan to rule France. With the Three Musketeers imprisoned, it is up to the Robonic Stooges to stop Cardinal Poreleau.
25	"Pest World Ain't the Best World"	February 25, 1978
The robotic outlaw Yulesinner has taken over a Wild West-themed park called Pest World.
26	"Superkong"	February 25, 1978
Aristotle Beastly has stolen a 20-story gorilla using his genetically-engineered giant bananas and is using it to commit crimes.
27	"Dr. Jekyll and Hide Curly"	March 4, 1978
In San Francisco at the turn of the century, Dr. Jekyll Hyde uses his Red Hot Atomic Pepper to create another side of him that plans vengeance on the Robonic Stooges for locking "them" away.
28	"Three Stooges and the Seven Dwarfs"	March 4, 1978
Once upon a time, an evil queen puts Ebony Black to sleep with a poison baked apple in a plot to keep her from completing a castle next to her castle. When the evil queen ends up making off with Ebony Black, the Robonic Stooges are sent to find Ebony and wake her.
29	"Blooperman"	March 11, 1978
Blooperman demands a raise of $1,000 an hour from Agent 000, which he is unable to give to him since Agent 000 also has to pay for the rent of the Superhero Employment Agency's headquarters. To keep Blooperman from heading to the side of evil, Agent 000 sends the Robonic Stooges to bring him back to the side of good.
30	"Jerk in the Beanstalk"	March 11, 1978
Curly accidentally uses a super concentrated fertilizer that causes a giant beanstalk to grow throughout the city. They soon use a super vitamin on a caterpillar to make it gigantic so that it can eat the beanstalk, which then also turns into a problem when it becomes a giant butterfly.
31	"Star Flaws"	March 18, 1978
In the year 3001, Galacto is using his Laser Eraser to erase the Earth's cities in a plan to conquer Earth.
32	"Stooges, You're Fired"	March 18, 1978
In this clip show, Agent 000's superior Agent 111 has grown tired of the Robonic Stooges' bungling. Agent 111 holds a trial to determine what to do with them.
