= Star Spangled Salesman =

- Screenshot showing The Three Stooges
- Directed by: Norman Maurer; Wingate Smith
- Written by: Bruce Howard
- Produced by: Norman Maurer
- Starring: Carl Reiner; Carol Burnett; Milton Berle; Howard Morris; Moe Howard; Larry Fine; Joe DeRita; John Banner; Werner Klemperer; Rafer Johnson; Tim Conway; Harry Morgan; Jack Webb
- Cinematography: Emil Oster
- Edited by: Harold F. Kress; Tom Patchett
- Distributed by: Columbia Pictures
- Release date: February 9, 1968 (U.S.)
- Running time: 20 minutes
- Country: United States
- Language: English

Star Spangled Salesman is a 1968 American short promotional film directed by Norman Maurer and Wingate Smith, starring celebrities including Carl Reiner, Carol Burnett, Milton Berle and The Three Stooges. It was written by Bruce Howard and produced by the U.S. Department of the Treasury to promote the sale of U.S. Savings Bonds. It was distributed by Columbia Pictures.

== Premise ==
Howard Morris, as a fictional version of himself, is assigned to get his showbiz colleagues interested in enrolling in a payroll plan that is tied to the purchase of savings bonds.

== Cast ==
- Carl Reiner as himself
- Carol Burnett as Miss Grebs
- Milton Berle as studio president
- Howard Morris as himself
- Joe DeRita as Curly Joe (as The Three Stooges)
- Larry Fine as Larry (as The Three Stooges)
- Moe Howard as Moe (as The Three Stooges)
- John Banner as chef
- Werner Klemperer as chef's boss
- Rafer Johnson as telephone repairman
- Tim Conway as telephone repairman
- Harry Morgan as TV cop
- Jack Webb as security man
- Alexandra Hay as blonde girl (uncredited)

== See also ==
- List of American films of 1968

== Bibliography ==
- Lenburg, Jeff; Maurer, Joan Howard; Lenburg, Greg (2012). The Three Stooges Scrapbook (Updated ed.). Chicago: Chicago Review Press. ISBN 978-1613740743.
