= Jitter Bughouse =

1948 American film by Jules White

- Directed by: Jules White
- Written by: Felix Adler
- Produced by: Jules White
- Starring: Joe DeRita; Christine McIntyre; Emil Sitka
- Edited by: Edwin H. Bryant
- Distributed by: Columbia Pictures
- Release date: April 29, 1948
- Running time: 17:57
- Country: United States
- Language: English

Jitter Bughouse is an American comedy short released by Columbia Pictures on April 29, 1948, starring Joe DeRita, Christine McIntyre and Emil Sitka.

== Plot ==
Joe and his band practice for their big break in musical commercials. Joe also has a theory that music can cure the mentally imbalanced, and when he learns that his girlfriend Myrtle (Christine McIntyre) is a nurse for the rich, eccentric Mr. Lark (Emil Sitka), the boys head off to the Lark mansion to give a concert.

== Cast ==
- Joe DeRita as Joe
- Christine McIntyre as Myrtle
- Emil Sitka as Mr. Lark
- Patsy Moran as Mrs. Schultz
- The Nov-Elites: Art Terry, Frankie Carr, Joe Mayer

== Production ==
Jitter Bughouse is a remake of The Radio Rogues short film Do Your Stuff (1935).

This was the fourth and final entry in the Joe DeRita series produced by Columbia from 1946-1948; all entries were remakes of other Columbia shorts. Sitka was at the time also a frequent supporting player in Columbia's Three Stooges short-film series; DeRita himself would join the Stooges in the late 1950s, becoming "Curly Joe" DeRita.

DeRita did not think highly of his output at Columbia Pictures, once commenting, "My comedy in those scripts was limited to getting hit on the head with something, then going over to my screen wife to say, 'Honey, don't leave me!' For this kind of comedy material, you could have gotten a busboy to do it and it would have been just as funny."
