= Kook's Tour =

1970 unreleased U.S. film by Norman Maurer

- 1975 Niles Film Products Super 8 Sound cover
- Directed by: Norman Maurer
- Written by: Norman Maurer
- Produced by: Norman Maurer
- Starring: Moe Howard; Larry Fine; Joe DeRita; Moose the Dog; Norman Maurer
- Cinematography: James T. Flocker; Michael Maurer
- Edited by: Pat Somerset
- Distributed by: Normandy Productions
- Release date: 1970
- Running time: 51 minutes
- Country: United States
- Language: English

Kook's Tour is an American comedy television film produced in 1969. It was the final film to star the Three Stooges and was the last known performance of the team. It was originally intended as the pilot for a television series. However, on January 9, 1970, before filming was completed, Larry Fine suffered a massive stroke, paralyzing the left side of his body. When it became clear that Fine was not expected to recover fully from the stroke, production of the series was canceled and the Kook's Tour pilot film was shelved.

Kook's Tour was conceived by Moe Howard's son-in-law, frequent Three Stooges collaborator Norman Maurer, as a weekly television series that would have mixed the Stooges' brand of farce comedy with a documentary travelogue format.

== Plot ==
After decades of comedic escapades, the Stooges enter a phase of retirement, embarking on a global journey accompanied by their dog, Moose, and equipped with a motor home and motor boat, the latter transported by cargo plane between destinations. Their travels take them across the vast wilderness of the western United States, spanning regions of Wyoming and Idaho.

Throughout their excursion, Larry repeatedly encounters disappointment in his attempts to catch fish and capture a photograph of a deer. His frustration reaches a peak when, in a moment of exasperation, he tosses his hat into the water, only to discover fish eagerly biting at the fishing hooks attached to it. However, Larry's elation is short-lived when Curly-Joe reveals that the fish caught are to be distributed among the trio, with an additional share reserved for Moose.

In the epilogue, Moe reflects on their journey from the confines of an office, contemplating their next destination, Japan, thereby concluding their adventure in the American wilderness.

== Cast ==
- Moe Howard as Moe / Narrator
- Larry Fine as Larry
- Joe DeRita as Curly-Joe
- Moose the Dog as himself
- Norman Maurer as camper
- Jeffrey Scott as young camper
- Michael Maurer as man carrying suitcases
- Lois Goleman as Littering woman
- Emil Sitka as the butler (archive footage)
- John Cliff
- Annie Smith as Woman
- Roger Thompson as Man

== Production notes ==
Kook's Tour marked the Stooges' third endeavor to establish a live-action television series, following their earlier attempts with Jerks of All Trades in 1949 and The Three Stooges Scrapbook in 1960. The title "Kook's Tour" plays on the popularized term "Cook's Tour," which was popularized by the Thomas Cook travel company. Additionally, the film served as a promotional platform for Chrysler, prominently featuring vehicles exclusively manufactured by Chrysler, Chrysler RV, and Chrysler Marine Division.

Following Larry's incapacitating stroke in January 1970 and the subsequent termination of Kook's Tour, the amassed footage lay dormant for several years until director Norman Maurer assumed the responsibility of condensing the salvageable material into a 52-minute film. Distributed by Niles Film Products in Super 8 Sound home movie format in 1975, the film eventually found its way onto VHS and DVD platforms, facilitated by Blackhawk Films. Supplementary filming for Kook's Tour was minimal, with a solitary additional day earmarked at a Los Angeles park, primarily to capture close-up sequences. The only surviving original 16mm print of Kook's Tour, other than the worn workprint, is privately owned in Florida. The film is in pristine condition and formerly owned by Chrysler.

== See also ==
- List of American films of 1970
