= Otis Campbell =

- The Andy Griffith Show character
- Otis Campbell portrayed by Hal Smith
- First appearance: "The Manhunt"; The Andy Griffith Show; October 10, 1960
- Last appearance: Return to Mayberry; April 13, 1986
- Portrayed by: Hal Smith

In-universe information
- Occupation: Town drunk
- Family: Ralph Campbell (brother); Verlaine Campbell (sister-in-law)
- Spouse: Rita Campbell
- Relatives: Uncle Nat; Nathan Tibbs; Charley Foley

Otis Campbell is the fictional "town drunk" in Mayberry on the American TV sitcom The Andy Griffith Show. Otis was played by Hal Smith and made frequent appearances on the show from 1960 to 1967 but stopped appearing toward the end of the series because of concerns raised by the sponsors over the portrayal of excessive drinking.

== Character overview ==
Otis works as a glue dipper in a furniture factory Monday through Friday and drinks all weekend. After a binge, Otis will usually lock himself in the town jail until he is sober. He has a key to the front door of the courthouse and the cell keys are hung on a nail near the cells (presumably, to accommodate Otis). The lack of crime in Mayberry and the laid-back attitude of the Sheriff's department easily accommodate Otis' drinking habit. On one occasion Otis brings a suit to the jail on Friday before his binge so that he can change into the suit for church on Sunday without going home first. Otis often lets himself in jail on the same day that a dignitary or a superior of Sheriff Andy Taylor is arriving at the courthouse, much to the chagrin of the sheriff or Deputy Barney Fife (Don Knotts). Typically, Otis admits himself to jail without being arrested.

In the episode "The Case of the Punch in the Nose", it is revealed that Otis was first arrested for drunkenness on September 23, 1941, at 2 p.m. (a Tuesday) but was released because it was "his first offense."

A common joke on the show was to have Otis see something bizarre or unexpected while he was inebriated that was actually present, but which he would assume to be a drunken hallucination. Once, Sheriff Taylor locked a dynamite-laden goat in a padded jail cell to prevent an explosion. Predictably, Otis stumbled in after a night of drinking, and let himself into the same cell, only to find the mattress nailed to the wall (along with the blanket). Otis attempted to climb into the bed anyway, and naturally fell on the floor. Believing the peculiarity to be a result of his intoxication, he exclaimed, "First time I ever fell off a bed onto the wall."

On the Danny Thomas Show episode that was the pilot for The Andy Griffith Show, Andy had deputized another town drunk, Will Hoople, so that Will could arrest himself every time he got drunk. In the episode "Deputy Otis", Otis was temporarily deputized when it was learned that his family thought he worked in the sheriff's office because of his use of their stationery. During that time Otis became agitated with Barney's dictatorial style and Barney was especially concerned about having the town drunk made a deputy.

An episode in Season 1 reveals Otis is the descendant of local Revolutionary War hero, Nathan Tibbs. The Women's Historical Society want to award Otis an honorary plaque, which causes Barney and the mayor to worry about Otis' condition at the upcoming ceremony; and, they pressure Andy to find a substitute. Otis, however, appears sober, clean-shaven and in a suit. He humbly gives the award to the town stating that he cannot take credit for "just being born." Also in this episode viewers are introduced to Otis' wife, Rita.

In episode "Deputy Otis," the season 2 finale, it is revealed that Otis has a brother named Ralph (Stanley Adams), who is the town drunk in another community. Ralph and his wife Verlaine visit Mayberry on their way to Memphis.

Toward the end of the series, Andy mentioned that Otis is now doing his drinking in Mt. Pilot.

In the 1986 television movie Return to Mayberry, it is revealed that Otis is now completely sober and employed as the town's ice-cream man, driving a van.

Smith appeared as town drunk Calver Weems in the Don Knotts comedy The Ghost and Mr. Chicken (1966), playing essentially a second version of Otis.
