= The Three Stooges Meet Hercules =

1962 film by Edward Bernds

- Film poster
- Directed by: Edward Bernds
- Screenplay by: Elwood Ullman
- Story by: Norman Maurer
- Produced by: Norman Maurer
- Starring: Moe Howard; Larry Fine; Joe DeRita; Vicki Trickett; Quinn Redeker; George N. Neise; Samson Burke; Emil Sitka; Hal Smith; Marlin McKeever; Mike McKeever
- Cinematography: Scotty Welbourne
- Edited by: Edwin H. Bryant
- Music by: Paul Dunlap
- Production company: Normandy Productions
- Distributed by: Columbia Pictures
- Release date: January 26, 1962 (U.S.)
- Running time: 89 minutes
- Country: United States
- Language: English
- Budget: $420,000
- Box office: $2 million or $1,175,000 (US/Canada)

The Three Stooges Meet Hercules is a 1962 American comedy fantasy film directed by Edward Bernds. It is the third feature film to star the Three Stooges after their 1959 resurgence in popularity. By this time, the trio consisted of Moe Howard, Larry Fine, and Joe DeRita (dubbed "Curly Joe"). Released by Columbia Pictures, The Three Stooges Meet Hercules was directed by long-time Stooges director Edward Bernds. It was the most financially successful of the Stooges' feature films.

== Plot ==
The Stooges find themselves embroiled in an unexpected journey through time when they assist their neighbor, Schuyler Davis, in constructing a time machine. Transported to Ithaca in ancient Greece during the reign of King Odius, the Stooges and their companions become entangled in a series of misadventures. Initially mistaken for gods due to their arrival coinciding with the imprisonment of Ulysses, they must navigate the amorous advances of the lecherous king while attempting to rectify the historical disruption they have caused.

Following an escape and a shipwreck, the group, armed with Curly Joe's soporific concoction, vanquishes a Siamese Cyclops. Their exploits then take a turn as they showcase Schuyler's newly acquired strength, forged through laborious rowing in a galley, at a local gladiatorial arena. This feat propels Schuyler into the role of Hercules, culminating in encounters with the genuine Hercules and subsequent collaboration to rescue Diane Quigley, Schuyler's disaffected girlfriend, from Odius's clutches.

Their exploits culminate in a chariot chase and a strategic maneuver to restore the proper course of history by depositing King Odius in the Wild West. Upon their return to the present day, they find their employer, Dimsal, inexplicably trapped in a pillory.

== Cast ==
- Moe Howard as Moe
- Larry Fine as Larry
- Joe DeRita as Curly Joe
- Quinn Redeker as Schuyler Davis
- Vicki Trickett as Diane Quigley
- George N. Neise as Ralph Dimsal/King Odius
- Samson Burke as Hercules
- Emil Sitka as Shepherd/Refreshment Man
- Hal Smith as King Theseus of Rhodes
- Marlin McKeever as Ajax (The Siamese Cyclops)
- Mike McKeever as Argo (The Siamese Cyclops)
- John Cliff as Ulysses
- Barbara Hines as Anita
- Terry Huntingdon as Hecuba
- Diana Piper as Helen
- Gregg Martell as Simon
- Gene Roth as harbor captain
- Lewis Charles as Achilles the Heel
- Edward Foster as Freddie the Fence
- Cecil Elliott as matron
- Rusty Wescoatt as Philo, the Horator

== Production notes ==
The Three Stooges Meet Hercules was filmed over 13 days on June 6–22, 1961. The film marked the return of director Edward Bernds, who had worked with Stooges during the Shemp Howard era through 1952 and was recruited to help revive several proven routines from the past. Bernds later commented, "The team wasn't the same. They were older and I had to remind myself to be careful with them. I didn't want them to have a heart attack in the middle of a scene. If they had to run up a flight of stairs, I'd cut to something and jump to them at the top of the stairs." Bernds also commented on working with new third Stooge, Joe DeRita: "[Joe DeRita] wasn't quite the typical Stooge, he wasn't quite as willing to be hurt as Curly was or even Shemp. And Moe was very considerate of him and Joe DeRita was a little temperamental and didn't like to be hurt. Moe took pains to make sure that Joe wasn't hurt the way Larry was, for instance, or the way Shemp used to be. He didn't get slapped as much. We had to use doubles more for Joe DeRita than we did Shemp or Curly."

=== Injury ===
Larry Fine sustained an injury that landed him in Cedars-Sinai Medical Center when filming a scene that involved climbing aboard a parked chariot. The 300-pound DeRita lost his grip and fell directly on top of Fine, knocking him unconscious. Fine was rushed to the hospital and quickly discharged when deemed fit enough to return to work. It was during Fine's brief hospital stay that he was diagnosed with Type 2 diabetes, which he controlled by resisting foods containing sugar for the remainder of his life (Fine died in January 1975).

== Reception ==
Moe Howard expressed his fondness for the film in 1973, stating "Of course Hercules I liked very much. Especially when we were in the slave ship. We had a great special effects team on that."

== See also ==
- List of American films of 1962
- List of films featuring Hercules
