= The Three Stooges in Orbit =

1962 film by Edward Bernds

- Directed by: Edward Bernds
- Screenplay by: Elwood Ullman
- Story by: Norman Maurer
- Produced by: Norman Maurer
- Starring: Moe Howard; Larry Fine; Joe DeRita; Emil Sitka; Carol Christensen; Edson Stroll; George N. Neise; Rayford Barnes; Norman Leavitt; Nestor Paiva; Don Lamond; Peter Dawson; Peter Brocco
- Cinematography: William P. Whitley
- Edited by: Edwin H. Bryant
- Music by: Paul Dunlap
- Production company: Normandy Productions
- Distributed by: Columbia Pictures
- Release dates: June 20, 1962 (Los Angeles); July 4, 1962 (United States); July 11, 1962 (New York City)
- Running time: 87:28
- Country: United States
- Language: English
- Box office: $1,500,000

The Three Stooges In Orbit is a 1962 American comedy science fiction film directed by Edward Bernds. It is the fourth feature film to star the Three Stooges after their 1959 resurgence in popularity. By this time, the trio consisted of Moe Howard, Larry Fine, and Joe DeRita (dubbed "Curly Joe"). Released by Columbia Pictures and produced by Normandy Productions, The Three Stooges in Orbit was directed by long-time Stooge director Edward Bernds, whom Moe later cited as the team's finest director.

== Plot ==
The Stooges are television actors grappling with the impending cancellation of their animated television show, The Three Stooges Scrapbook. Their producer's dissatisfaction prompts a ten-day ultimatum to devise a compelling concept, forcing the Stooges to seek alternative lodging after an unfortunate cooking mishap results in eviction. Fortuitously, they find lodging in the eccentric abode of Professor Danforth, a fervent believer in an imminent Martian invasion. Danforth enlists the Stooges' assistance in developing a multifunctional military vehicle in exchange for his creation of an "electronic animation" device for their show. Despite initial skepticism, the Stooges agree to Danforth's peculiar request.

Unknown to them, the butler, disguised as a monster, is really a Martian spy, signaling the extraterrestrial threat. As the Martians dispatch additional spies to Earth, a series of comedic mishaps ensue, including a transmission error of antiquated films and the inadvertent acquisition of a nuclear depth bomb, mistaken for a carburetor. A test run of the military vehicle leads the Stooges into a nuclear test area, culminating in an unexpected performance enhancement upon attaching the bomb to the engine.

Subsequently, a confrontation with the Martians ensues aboard the vehicle, climaxing in a daring endeavor to thwart the impending destruction of Earth and Disneyland. The Stooges successfully dismantle the Martians' scheme, averting catastrophe and ultimately saving their careers.

== Cast ==
- Moe Howard as Moe
- Larry Fine as Larry
- Joe DeRita as Curly-Joe
- Emil Sitka as Professor Danforth
- Carol Christensen as Carol Danforth
- Edson Stroll as Capt. Tom Andrews
- George N. Neise as Ogg/Airline Pilot
- Rayford Barnes as Zogg/Airline Co-Pilot
- Norman Leavitt as William, the Martian Butler
- Nestor Paiva as Martian Chairman
- Don Lamond as Col. Smithers
- Peter Dawson as Gen. Bixby
- Peter Brocco as Dr. Appleby
- Cheerio Meredith as Tooth Paste Old Maid

== Production ==
The inception of The Three Stooges in Orbit can be traced back to The Three Stooges Scrapbook, an unsuccessful color television pilot crafted in 1960 at a financial outlay of $30,000. Confronted with the pilot's lack of commercial success, producer Norman Maurer repurposed the existing footage by transforming it into black and white. Concurrently, Maurer structured the narrative around the premise of the Stooges engaging in rehearsals for their prospective television endeavor. Maurer also capitalized on the availability of numerous film props initially utilized in the production of Forbidden Planet.

== See also ==
- List of American films of 1962
- Landwasserschlepper
