= The Abbott and Costello Cartoon Show =

US animated television series based on Abbott and Costello

- Genre: Comedy
- Developed by: Lee Orgel
- Written by: Michael Maltese; Jack Mendelsohn; Neal Barbera
- Directed by: William Hanna; Joseph Barbera
- Voices of: Bud Abbott; Stan Irwin
- Theme music composer: Hoyt Curtin
- Composers: Hoyt Curtin; Ted Nichols
- Country of origin: United States
- Original language: English
- No. of seasons: 1
- No. of episodes: 39

Production
- Executive producer: Lee Orgel
- Producers: William Hanna; Joseph Barbera
- Running time: 22–24 minutes
- Production companies: Hanna-Barbera; RKO General; Jomar Productions

Original release
- Network: Syndication
- Release: September 9, 1967 – June 1, 1968

The Abbott and Costello Cartoon Show is an American half-hour animated comedy television series of the famous comedy duo that aired in syndication from September 9, 1967, to June 1, 1968. Each of the 39 individual episodes consisted of four five-minute cartoons. The cartoons were created jointly by Hanna-Barbera, RKO General, and Jomar Productions from 1965 to 1967. The series was syndicated by Gold Key Entertainment and King World Productions, with the rights now owned by Warner Bros. Television Distribution (through Turner Entertainment).

Bud Abbott provided the voice for his own character. Stan Irwin provided the voice of Lou Costello, who had died in 1959. The rest of the voice cast was composed of Hanna-Barbera regulars. Canadian cartoonist Lynn Johnston, best known for her comic strip, For Better or For Worse, was an uncredited cel colorist.

== Production ==
Abbott and Costello is among the animated programs of the 1960s that are based on the decade's nostalgia craze which animated other comedy teams of the past such as Laurel and Hardy and The New 3 Stooges. It was pitched by the duo's manager Eddie Sherman to producer Lee Orgel, who also worked on The New 3 Stooges and further developed the concept. Orgel originally planned for the series to be produced at Cambria Productions, however the show's sponsor insisted it be done entirely at Hanna-Barbera instead. The show created work for the ill and impoverished Bud Abbott, who provided the voice of his animated character. Lou Costello had died in 1959, and his voice was supplied by nightclub manager Stan Irwin (1920-2015), who was a close friend of the duo.

== Voices ==
- Bud Abbott as Himself
- Stan Irwin as Lou Costello

Additional voices: Mel Blanc, Don Messick, Hal Smith, John Stephenson, Janet Waldo

== Episodes ==
The Abbott and Costello Cartoon Show Episodes
No.	Title	Original release date
1	"Cops and Saucers"	September 9, 1967
1	"Dog Gone Dog"	September 9, 1967
1	"Go Go Goliath"	September 9, 1967
1	"In the Soup"	September 9, 1967
2	"The Cloud Monster"	September 16, 1967
2	"The Gravity Grabber"	September 16, 1967
2	"There Auto Be a Law"	September 16, 1967
2	"Tiny Terror"	September 16, 1967
3	"Big Bird Break Out"	September 23, 1967
3	"Going Buggy"	September 23, 1967
3	"Sahara You?"	September 23, 1967
3	"The Vikings"	September 23, 1967
4	"Down in the Dumps"	September 30, 1967
4	"Eskimo Pie-eyed"	September 30, 1967
4	"Lube-a-Tuba"	September 30, 1967
4	"The Forty Thieves"	September 30, 1967
5	"Frail Whale"	October 7, 1967
5	"Sitting Pity"	October 7, 1967
5	"Tooth or Consequences"	October 7, 1967
5	"Wizardland"	October 7, 1967
6	"Catman on a Hot Tin Roof"	October 14, 1967
6	"Elephantasy"	October 14, 1967
6	"Shutter Bugged Sea Serpent"	October 14, 1967
6	"The Mark of El-Zap"	October 14, 1967
7	"Kooks and Spooks"	October 21, 1967
7	"Mouse Route"	October 21, 1967
7	"Stand-In Stand-Off"	October 21, 1967
7	"Super Lou"	October 21, 1967
8	"Dinosaur Dilemma"	October 28, 1967
8	"Frigid Fugitive"	October 28, 1967
8	"The Astro Nuttys"	October 28, 1967
8	"The Industructible Space Suit"	October 28, 1967
9	"Galoots in Armor Suits"	November 4, 1967
9	"Mighty Midget Mustang"	November 4, 1967
9	"The Bouncing Rubber Man"	November 4, 1967
9	"The Purple Baron"	November 4, 1967
10	"Abbott and Costello in Blunderland"	November 11, 1967
10	"Going to Pot"	November 11, 1967
10	"Skyscrapper Napper"	November 11, 1967
10	"The Two Musketeers"	November 11, 1967
11	"A Creep in the Deep"	November 18, 1967
11	"Crying High"	November 18, 1967
11	"Germ Squirm"	November 18, 1967
11	"Weird Neighbors"	November 18, 1967
12	"Lashed but Leashed"	November 25, 1967
12	"Pigskin Pickle"	November 25, 1967
12	"The Moleman Mine"	November 25, 1967
12	"Two on the Isle"	November 25, 1967
13	"Space Toy Tyrants"	December 2, 1967
13	"The Little Fat Boy Cried Wolf"	December 2, 1967
13	"Wacky Wax Work"	December 2, 1967
13	"Werewolf Whim-Wham"	December 2, 1967
14	"A Goose Misuse"	December 9, 1967
14	"Invader Raider"	December 9, 1967
14	"Monster Muddled"	December 9, 1967
14	"The Monsterkeet"	December 9, 1967
15	"Going, Going, Gun!"	December 16, 1967
15	"Paddle Boat Pirate"	December 16, 1967
15	"Road Race Ruckus"	December 16, 1967
15	"Who Needs Arrest?"	December 16, 1967
16	"Baby Buggy"	December 23, 1967
16	"Drumsticks Along the Mohawk"	December 23, 1967
16	"Gone Ghosts"	December 23, 1967
16	"Hey, Abbott!"	December 23, 1967
17	"A Car Is Born"	December 30, 1967
17	"Lumbering Lummoxes"	December 30, 1967
17	"Professor Uncle's Ants"	December 30, 1967
17	"Teenie Weenie Genie"	December 30, 1967
18	"Fish-Hooked"	January 6, 1968
18	"High Wire Lion"	January 6, 1968
18	"Magic Monster"	January 6, 1968
18	"Planet Plant"	January 6, 1968
19	"Baby Shoo"	January 13, 1968
19	"Marauding Mummy"	January 13, 1968
19	"Space Beard"	January 13, 1968
19	"The Long Long Camper"	January 13, 1968
20	"Fumbled Fable"	January 20, 1968
20	"Phantom of the Hoss Opera"	January 20, 1968
20	"Puppet Enemy Number One"	January 20, 1968
20	"Rabbit Grabbers"	January 20, 1968
21	"Phoney Express"	January 27, 1968
21	"The Big Cannon Caper"	January 27, 1968
21	"The Vacuum Villain"	January 27, 1968
21	"Throne of a Loss"	January 27, 1968
22	"A Guest in the Nest"	February 3, 1968
22	"Concrete Evidence"	February 3, 1968
22	"Glass Reunion"	February 3, 1968
22	"The Lava Monster"	February 3, 1968
23	"Broom Gloom"	February 10, 1968
23	"Gadzooka"	February 10, 1968
23	"Gone Like the Wind"	February 10, 1968
23	"Merry Misfits"	February 10, 1968
24	"Fighting the Clock"	February 17, 1968
24	"Rescue Miscue"	February 17, 1968
24	"Sinister Professor Sinister"	February 17, 1968
24	"The Hound Hounders"	February 17, 1968
25	"Bully Billy"	February 24, 1968
25	"Pigs in a Panic"	February 24, 1968
25	"Ship Ahooey"	February 24, 1968
25	"Underworld Whirl"	February 24, 1968
26	"Dragon Along"	March 2, 1968
26	"Mounty-Bounty"	March 2, 1968
26	"Password to Panic"	March 2, 1968
26	"Super Terror Strikes Again"	March 2, 1968
27	"No Place Like Rome"	March 9, 1968
27	"Not So Sweet Sioux"	March 9, 1968
27	"Texas Jack"	March 9, 1968
27	"Follow the Bouncing Blob"	March 9, 1968
28	"Luna Tricks"	March 16, 1968
28	"Pearl Diving Perils"	March 16, 1968
28	"Picture Frame-Up"	March 16, 1968
28	"The Queen of Diamonds"	March 16, 1968
29	"Booty Bounty"	March 23, 1968
29	"Dangerous Buck"	March 23, 1968
29	"G.I. Jokers"	March 23, 1968
29	"Tasmanian Terror"	March 23, 1968
30	"Gator Baiter"	March 30, 1968
30	"The Fiendish Farmer"	March 30, 1968
30	"The Gadget King"	March 30, 1968
30	"The Ice-Tronauts"	March 30, 1968
31	"Rabbit Rouser"	April 6, 1968
31	"Save a Cave"	April 6, 1968
31	"Which Witch Is Which?"	April 6, 1968
31	"Wild Man, Wild"	April 6, 1968
32	"Doggies by the Dozen"	April 13, 1968
32	"Shooting the Works"	April 13, 1968
32	"Son of Konk"	April 13, 1968
32	"Super Knight"	April 13, 1968
33	"Bully for Lou"	April 20, 1968
33	"Cherokee Choo-Choo"	April 20, 1968
33	"Hotel Suite and Sour"	April 20, 1968
33	"Rhino Riot"	April 20, 1968
34	"Carnival of Menace"	April 27, 1968
34	"Shoo Shoes"	April 27, 1968
34	"Teensy vs. Weensys"	April 27, 1968
34	"Tragic Magic"	April 27, 1968
35	"Get 'im Tiger"	May 4, 1968
35	"Hullaba-Lou"	May 4, 1968
35	"Mountain Mischief"	May 4, 1968
35	"The Drastic Driller"	May 4, 1968
36	"Gorilla Thriller"	May 11, 1968
36	"The Eighth Dwarf"	May 11, 1968
36	"Turkish Daffy"	May 11, 1968
36	"Yankee Doodle Dudes"	May 11, 1968
37	"Rodeo Rumpus"	May 18, 1968
37	"Run of DeMille Pictures"	May 18, 1968
37	"Super Car"	May 18, 1968
37	"The Sinister Stinger"	May 18, 1968
38	"Bad Day at High Noon"	May 25, 1968
38	"Magic Mix-Up"	May 25, 1968
38	"Shock Treatment"	May 25, 1968
38	"Tom All-Thumbs"	May 25, 1968
39	"Pinocchio's Double Trouble"	June 1, 1968
39	"Private General Nuisance"	June 1, 1968
39	"Starlight Starfright"	June 1, 1968
39	"Trigger Tricks"	June 1, 1968

== Comic book series ==
A comic book based on the TV show was produced by Charlton Comics. Starting in February 1968, it ran for 22 issues, ending in August 1971.

== Reception ==
Hal Erickson, author of Television Cartoon Shows, An Illustrated Encyclopedia gave the program a negative review, stating that Abbott and Costello episodes were difficult to tell apart. Erickson stated that "virtually every one them features the tubby Costello being pursued by some bugeyed monster or giant sized garden pest" and that "None of the classic verbal exchanges which brought the real Abbott and Costello to fame in the first place are evident."

== Home media ==
An episode of the show, "Gadzooka" was released in May 2013 as part of The Best of Warner Bros.: Hanna Barbera 25 Cartoon Collection DVD set.

The series will be released on Blu-ray on December 29, 2026, from Warner Archive restored from the original camera negatives.

== See also ==
- The New 3 Stooges
- Laurel and Hardy (TV series)
- Babbit and Catstello
- List of Hanna-Barbera characters
- List of works produced by Hanna-Barbera Productions
