= Jerks of All Trades =

US television program featuring The Three Stooges

- Genre: Sitcom, Television pilot
- Directed by: George Cahan
- Starring: Moe Howard; Larry Fine; Shemp Howard; Emil Sitka; Symona Boniface; Dink Trout
- Country of origin: United States
- Original language: English
- No. of episodes: 1

Production
- Producer: Phil Berle
- Camera setup: Multi-camera
- Running time: 20 minutes

Original release
- Network: ABC

Jerks of All Trades (identified on the title card only as “The Three Stooges”) is the title of an American television pilot filmed on October 12, 1949. It was The Three Stooges' first and only pilot made with Shemp Howard in the role of the third stooge. Filmed before a live studio audience, it was a pilot for a planned TV series on the then-new ABC Television Network. The pilot film is currently in the public domain and is available on home video.

The pilot was not broadcast, and the series never went into production due to objections from Columbia Pictures, who held the trio under contract. To avert a legal hassle, Columbia instead licensed a package of 30 shorts from the film series to ABC.

== Plot ==
The series entails the Stooges exploring various occupations weekly in pursuit of potential success, with each endeavor invariably descending into chaos, thus providing comedic fodder. In the pilot episode, they venture into the realm of interior decorating. Upon meeting their new client, Mr. Pennyfeather, Shemp inadvertently stains Pennyfeather's attire, provoking his ire. Subsequently, The Stooges engage Pennyfeather in a mischievous challenge, featuring their renowned "Texas" routine. Amidst slapstick antics, they forcibly remove Pennyfeather from their office.

Shortly thereafter, they are summoned by another client to manage her household. Within the confines of the client's residence, The Stooges, while attempting wallpapering, inadvertently wreak havoc. To their dismay, the client turns out to be Mrs. Pennyfeather, and the house is revealed to be Mr. Pennyfeather's domicile. In a tumultuous turn of events, Mr. Pennyfeather returns home to find himself adorned with wallpaper, prompting a recognition between him and The Stooges. Enraged, both Pennyfeathers assail The Stooges with paint and utensils, while also exchanging barbs over their decision to engage the trio.

Ultimately, Moe, Larry, and Shemp emerge defeated and injured, leading them to expunge "interior decorators" from the plethora of services listed on their office door. The list humorously includes a variety of comically misspelled potential occupations for future episodes, ranging from physicians and lawyers to engineers and babysitters.

== See also ==
- The Three Stooges Scrapbook - an early-1960s pilot
- Kook's Tour - a pilot produced in 1969–70
