= The Three Stooges Go Around the World in a Daze =

1963 film by Norman Maurer

- Directed by: Norman Maurer
- Screenplay by: Elwood Ullman
- Story by: Norman Maurer
- Based on: Around the World in Eighty Days by Jules Verne
- Produced by: Norman Maurer
- Starring: Moe Howard; Larry Fine; Joe DeRita; Jay Sheffield; Joan Freeman
- Cinematography: Irving Lippman
- Edited by: Edwin H. Bryant
- Music by: Paul Dunlap
- Distributed by: Columbia Pictures
- Release date: August 21, 1963
- Running time: 93:01
- Country: United States
- Language: English
- Box office: $1,000,000

The Three Stooges Go Around the World in a Daze is the fifth feature film made by The Three Stooges after their 1959 resurgence in popularity. By this time, the trio consisted of Moe Howard, Larry Fine, and Joe DeRita (dubbed "Curly Joe"). Directed by Howard's son-in-law Norman Maurer, the film was loosely based on the 1872 Jules Verne classic Around the World in Eighty Days.

== Plot ==
Phileas Fogg III, the great-grandson of the renowned adventurer, undertakes a challenge to replicate his ancestor's iconic circumnavigation of the globe. The wager is initiated by Randolph Stuart III, purportedly a descendant of the elder Fogg's historical adversary. Unbeknownst to the participants, Stuart is revealed to be Vicker Cavendish, a notorious confidence trickster employing the bet as a ruse to conceal his embezzlement from the Bank of England, intending to frame Fogg for the crime.

Accompanying Cavendish is his cunning Cockney co-conspirator, Filch. This venture poses considerable peril for Fogg and his entourage, consisting of the Stooges and the newly acquainted Amelia Carter, whom they rescue during a tumultuous train journey. The narrative unfolds with diverse episodes: an endeavor to purloin a cream pie on a British cargo ship bound for Turkey, an observation of an intricate Indian dance at a maharajah's palace featuring the Stooges, and an arrest in China, where the characters endure Communist brainwashing, leading to their release adrift in a small boat. Exploiting Curly-Joe's music-induced strength, the group secures sustenance, attire, and passage to San Francisco from the manager of a formidable sumo wrestler in Tokyo. Subsequently, they clandestinely board a moving van ostensibly headed for New York City, leading to their apprehension and subsequent arrest in Canada by a British inspector. Adopting British accents, the Stooges and Amelia contrive to be arrested alongside Fogg.

Returning to London, they encounter Cavendish and Filch once more, masquerading as police officers armed with hostile intent. Parallel to the original Phileas Fogg's journey, the descendant narrowly miscalculates, preserving an opportunity. In a final pursuit, Curly-Joe propels the police wagon through London, enabling Fogg to triumph in the bet, concluding with a dramatic crash into the Reformer's Club just seconds before the deadline.

== Cast ==
- Moe Howard as Moe
- Larry Fine as Larry
- Joe DeRita as Curly Joe
- Jay Sheffield as Phileas Fogg III
- Joan Freeman as Amelia Carter
- Walter Burke as Lory Filch
- Peter Forster as Vickers Cavendish/"Stuart"
- Maurice Dallimore as Inspector J. B. Crotchet
- Richard Devon as Maharajah
- Anthony Eustrel as Kandu
- Iau Kea as Itchi Kitchi
- Robert Kino as Charlie Okuma
- Phil Arnold as Referee
- Emil Sitka as Butler at Reformer's Club
- Laurie Main as a member of the Reformer's Club
- Jeffrey Scott as Little Boy who Steals Larry's Instrument

== Production notes ==
The Three Stooges brought back their famous "Maharaja" routine here for the third time, which was originally showcased in Time Out for Rhythm (1941), and later reused in their 1946 short subject Three Little Pirates. The Pop Goes the Weasel bit from Punch Drunks (1934) also makes an appearance in the film.

Regarding eye pokes, IMDB reports:

Moe says "we don't do that anymore", after one of the Stooge lookalikes 'eye pokes' one of the other lookalikes. This comes from an agreement Moe Howard and Larry Fine made with Joe DeRita at the beginning of the full length movie series. The agreement was that the eye poke would not be used by the group any longer due to the resurgence of the popularity of the comedy trio, especially with kids seeing the shorts during afternoon children's programming. DeRita was concerned that kids would imitate the eye poke, and not do it correctly, thus causing real damage to the eyes. Moe and Larry agreed with DeRita, and the eye poke was retired from the act, making this scene a rarity in the later Stooge years.
