= Once Upon a Girl =

- Theatrical release poster
- Directed by: Don Jurwich; Jack Conrad (live-action segments)
- Written by: Don Jurwich; Joel Seibel
- Produced by: Don Jurwich; Joel Seibel; David Winters (executive)
- Starring: Richmond Johnson; Carol Piacente; Kelly Gordon; Hal Smith; Frank Welker
- Cinematography: Emmett Alston
- Edited by: Frank Howard
- Music by: Martin Slavin
- Production companies: Concelation a Girl, Inc.; Tommy J. Productions
- Distributed by: PRO International Pictures
- Release date: June 20, 1976
- Running time: 80 minutes
- Country: United States
- Language: English

Once Upon a Girl is a 1976 American pornographic live-action/animated fantasy comedy film produced and directed by Don Jurwich, and co-written by Jurwich and Joel Seibel. It was done by a group of animators, former employees of Walt Disney Productions and Hanna-Barbera, according to the director in an interview included with the DVD release.

== Plot ==
A lewd old lady claiming to be Mother Goose (Hal Smith) has been put on trial for obscenity due to telling the "true versions" of famous fairy tales. Her evidence is presented as a collection of pornographic animated shorts, those of Jack and the Beanstalk, Cinderella, and Little Red Riding Hood.

== Cast ==
- Hal Smith – Mother Goose (live action segments) / Giant / Additional voices
- Frank Welker – Jack / Fairy Godmother / Prince / Additional voices
- Richmond Johnson
- Carol Piacente
- Kelly Gordon

== Home media ==
On November 14, 2006, Severin Films released Once Upon a Girl on DVD, featuring the uncut version, as Severin surrendered the original X rating for an unrated video release.

== Reception ==
DVD Talk said, "Oddly, for a film that was rated X and includes a lengthy gynecological moment that takes us deep inside some enormous intercourse, the film doesn't depict any insertion, cutting the act just outside of the frame, or hidden with positioning. Such prudishness isn't going to satisfy the pervier viewers in the audience. If only such displays of tastefulness were attempted with the film's weak comedy."

== See also ==
- List of animated feature-length films
