= Norman Maurer =

American film producer (1926–1986)

- Born: Norman Albert Maurer; May 13, 1926; Brooklyn, New York, U.S.
- Died: November 23, 1986 (aged 60); Los Angeles, California, U.S.
- Occupations: Comic book artist, writer, director, producer
- Years active: 1949–1986
- Spouse: Joan Howard (m. 1947)
- Children: 2

Norman Albert Maurer (May 13, 1926 – November 23, 1986) was an American comic book artist and writer, and a director and producer of films and television shows. He is best known for his longtime professional and personal association with The Three Stooges comedy team from the late 1940s onwards.

== Comic books ==
Maurer's lifelong association with the Three Stooges began about the time of his marriage to Joan Howard, the daughter of the comedy team's Moe Howard on June 29, 1947. In 1949, he produced two Three Stooges comic book issues for Jubilee, based on the short films the team was making for Columbia Pictures. In 1953, Maurer created the first 3-D comics, Three-Dimension Comics featuring Mighty Mouse, with his brother, Leonard Maurer, and Joe Kubert. Two three-dimensional Stooge comics were also issued in 1953. He returned to the Stooges in comic form in 1972 with Gold Key Comics' The Little Stooges, which ran for seven issues over the next two years.

== Films ==
Maurer was associate producer of Space Master X-7 (1958), in which his father-in-law, Moe, had a minor role, and is credited with the creation of the CineMagic process used in the 1960 film The Angry Red Planet.

Along with Moe, Maurer co-managed the Three Stooges after Columbia terminated their employment in 1957, and has credits in most of their later feature films. He produced The Three Stooges Scrapbook (1960), and wrote the screen stories and produced The Three Stooges Meet Hercules (1962), The Three Stooges in Orbit (1962), The Three Stooges Go Around the World in a Daze (1963) and The Outlaws Is Coming! (1965), the last two of which he also directed.

Who's Minding the Mint (1967) was produced by Norman Maurer for Columbia Pictures.

Maurer's son, Jeffrey Scott (Moe's grandson), can be seen in The Outlaws IS Coming!, credited as Jeffrey Alan, and The Three Stooges Go Around the World in a Daze in the role of Timmy, credited as Geoffrey A. Maurer. Maurer himself can also be seen on camera as a TV cameraman in The Three Stooges Scrapbook and as a camper in 1970's Kook's Tour, which he also directed. Kook's Tour was intended to be a comedy-travelogue television series featuring the Stooges, but Larry Fine suffered a stroke during production of the pilot episode and the series was cancelled; several years later, Maurer edited together a 50-minute version of Kook's Tour using available footage from the pilot and released it to the then-booming Super 8 home movie market.

== Animation ==
Maurer was executive producer of the 39 live-action segments used to introduce and follow Cambria Studios' syndicated The New Three Stooges cartoons (1965–1966).

He later became associated with Hanna-Barbera, working as a writer on their The New Scooby-Doo Movies (1972), Speed Buggy (1973), The Scooby-Doo/Dynomutt Hour (1976), and season one of The Richie Rich Show. In 1977 he was working on the Hanna-Barbera cartoon The All-New Super Friends Hour, and he is credited as being the creator of the characters The Wonder Twins. He also created and was the executive producer of their 1978 series, The Robonic Stooges. Maurer's sons, Jeffrey Scott and Michael Maurer also have prolific careers as TV cartoon writers.

== Death ==
Busy until the end, Maurer died of cancer on November 23, 1986, in Los Angeles. His entombment was at Hillside Memorial Park Cemetery.
