= Joe DeRita =

American actor and comedian (1909–1993)

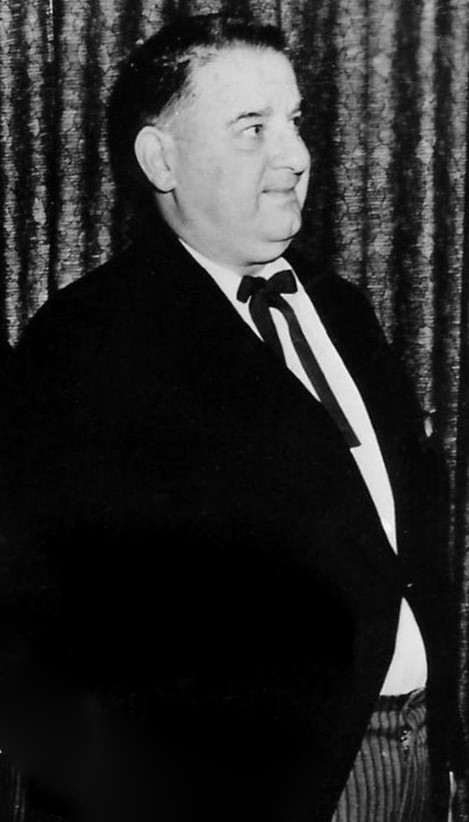
- Curly Joe DeRita in 1962
- Born: Joseph Wardell; July 12, 1909; Philadelphia, Pennsylvania, U.S.
- Died: July 3, 1993 (aged 83); Los Angeles, California, U.S.
- Resting place: Valhalla Memorial Park Cemetery
- Occupations: Actor; comedian
- Years active: 1920–1975
- Spouses: Bonnie Brooks (m. 1935; died 1965) Jean Sullivan (m. 1967)
- Website: threestooges.net

Joseph Wardell (July 12, 1909 – July 3, 1993), known professionally as Joe DeRita, was an American actor and comedian, who is best known for his stint as a member of The Three Stooges in the persona of Curly Joe DeRita.

== Early life ==
DeRita was born into a show-business family in Philadelphia, the son of Florenz (née DeRita) and Frank Wardell, and of French-Canadian and English ancestry. He was the youngest of 5 brothers. Wardell's father was a stage technician, his mother a professional stage dancer, and the three often acted on stage together from his early childhood. Taking his mother's maiden name, DeRita, the actor joined the burlesque circuit during the 1920s, gaining fame as a comedian. During World War II, DeRita joined the USO, performing throughout Britain, France, and the Pacific with such celebrities as Bing Crosby and Randolph Scott.

== Career ==
=== Joe DeRita short subjects ===
Curly Joe DeRita in 1959

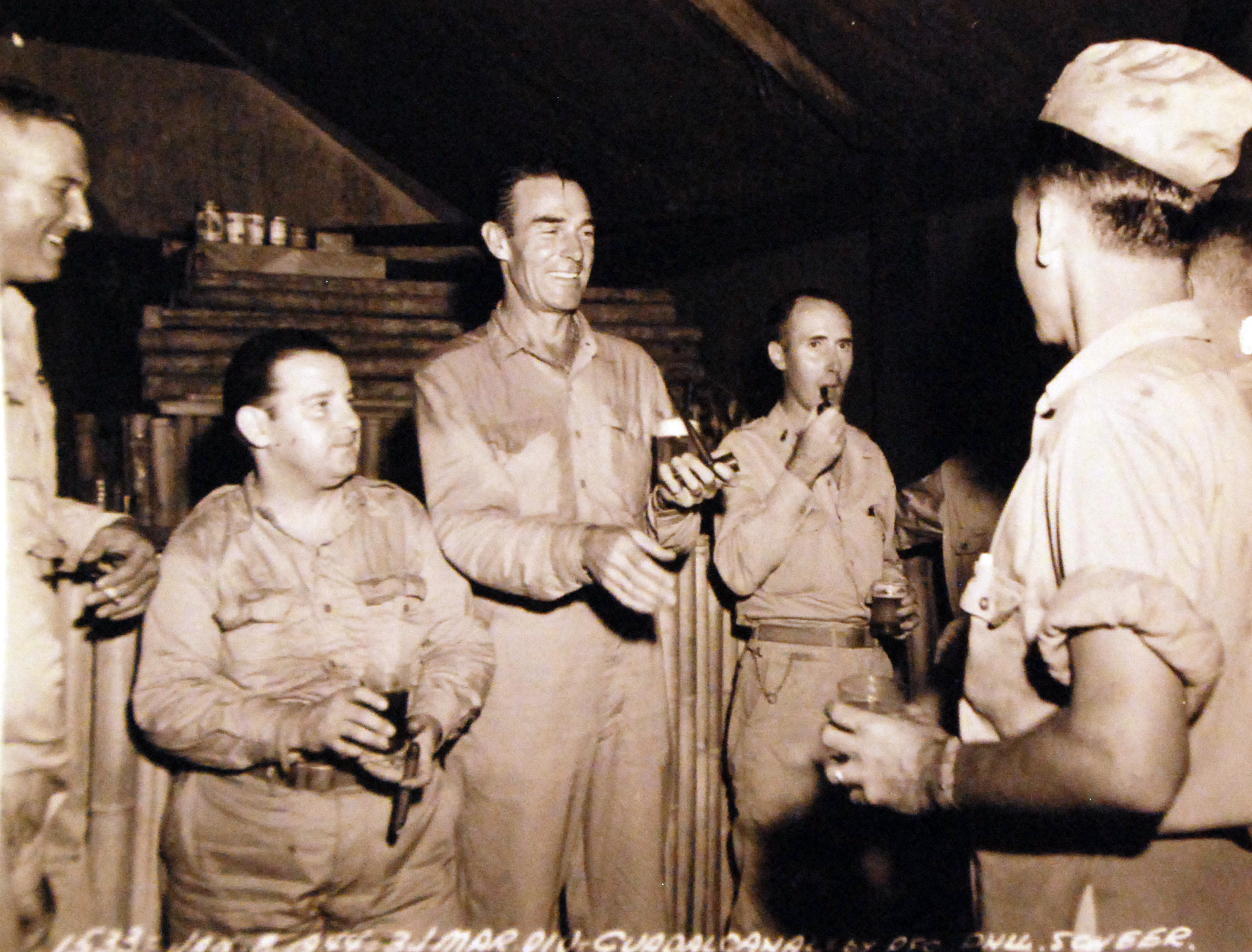
Joe DeRita and Randolph Scott (center) on Guadalcanal ca. 1942–43

In 1946, DeRita was hired by Columbia Pictures Short Subjects Division head/director Jules White to star in his own series of comedies. The first effort, Slappily Married, was released under the studio's All-Star Comedy series. The three remaining entries—The Good Bad Egg, Wedlock Deadlock (both 1947) and Jitter Bughouse (1948)—billed DeRita as the headliner. Regarding his Columbia shorts series, DeRita said, "My comedy in those scripts was limited to getting hit on the head with something, then going over to my screen wife to say, 'Honey, don't leave me!' For this kind of comedy material, you could have gotten a busboy to do it and it would have been just as funny." After his contract with Columbia ended, DeRita returned to burlesque and recorded a risque LP in 1950 called Burlesque Uncensored.

=== Larry, Moe and Curly Joe ===
When Shemp Howard died of a heart attack on November 22, 1955, the Three Stooges were still making short comedies for Columbia Pictures. Shemp was succeeded by Joe Besser in 1956; both Shemp Howard and Joe Besser had starred in their own separate short subjects. Columbia eventually shut down the short-subjects department at the end of 1957, and Besser quit the act in 1958 to take care of his ailing wife. The two remaining Stooges seriously considered retirement. But Larry saw DeRita in a Las Vegas stage engagement and told Moe that DeRita would be "perfect for the third Stooge." Howard and Fine invited DeRita to join the act, and he readily accepted. At first, they had difficulty drawing an audience. But Columbia began releasing their shorts to television through their Screen Gems subsidiary, and their popularity with children put them back on top.

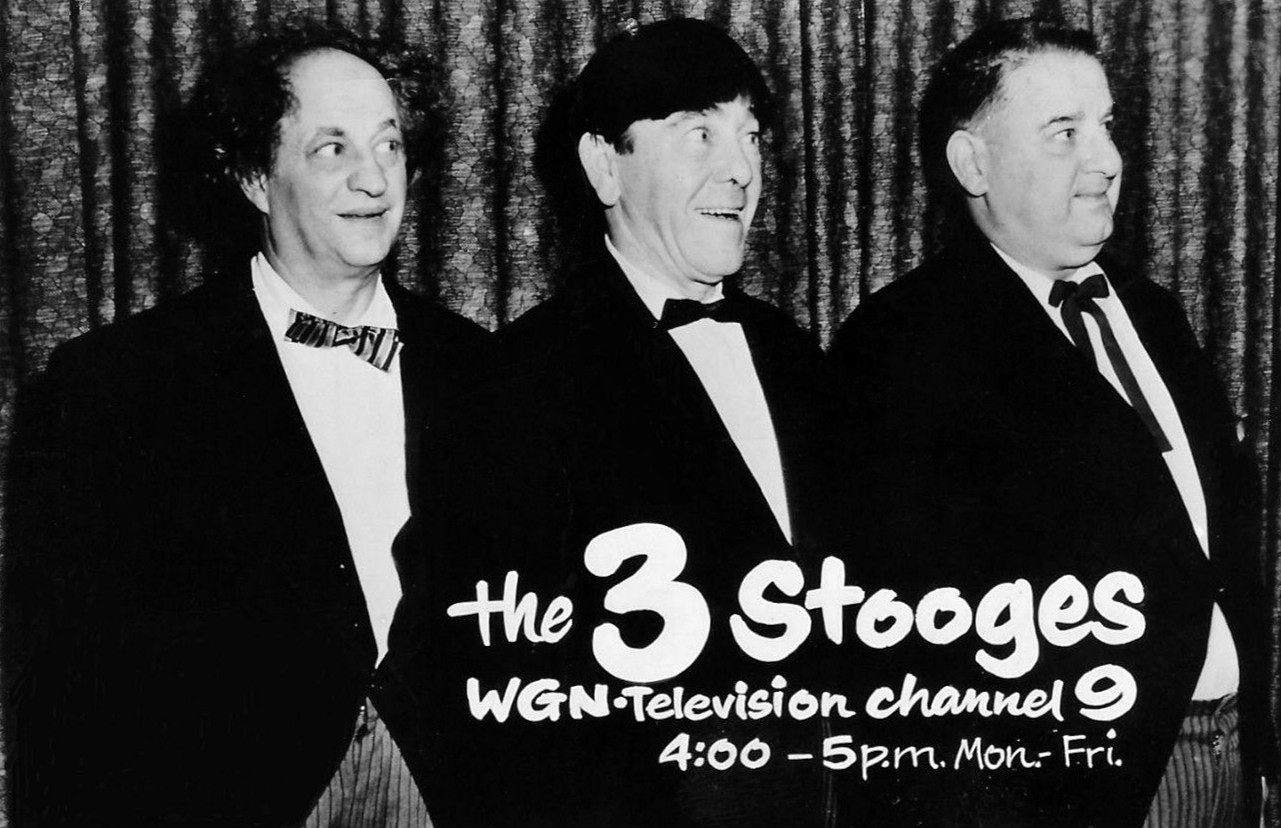
Larry, Moe and Curly Joe (1962)

It was rumored that Jules White had attempted to recruit DeRita for the Three Stooges in 1955 because he wanted "another Curly", but that strong-willed DeRita had refused to change his act or imitate another performer, and White eventually gave up on him. DeRita himself debunked the rumor, saying that it "added a romance to the story". When he first joined the act, shortly after appearing in a dramatic role in the Gregory Peck Western, The Bravados, DeRita wore his hair in a style similar to that of former Stooge Shemp Howard and did so during initial live stage performances. However, with the restored popularity of the Three Stooges shorts on TV featuring Curly Howard, it was suggested that Joe shave his head in order to look more like Curly. At first, DeRita sported a crew cut; this eventually became a fully shaven head. Because of his physical resemblance to both Curly and Joe Besser, and to avoid confusion with his predecessors, DeRita was renamed "Curly Joe".

=== Theatrical feature films ===
The team embarked on a new series of six feature-length theatrical Three Stooges films, including Have Rocket, Will Travel (1959), DeRita's on-screen debut with the Stooges, and Snow White and the Three Stooges (1961). These recycled routines and songs from the older films. Moe and Larry's advanced age, as well as pressure from children's advocacy groups, resulted in milder forms of their trademark slapstick. While DeRita's physical appearance was vaguely reminiscent of Curly, his characterization was different.

=== Gradual decline ===
DeRita remained a member of the team through the 1960s, participating in a full workload of television appearances and commercials, a multiyear movie contract, and The New Three Stooges animated cartoons series, which included live-action introductions. In January 1970 Larry Fine had a stroke during the production of Kook's Tour, a pilot for a planned TV series, which put all new Stooges-related material on hold. Emil Sitka was twice named as "the middle stooge", but never got to perform with the team. Shortly after Larry's stroke, Moe, Emil, and Joe were going to appear in a movie written by Moe's grandson, but financing fell through. Before Moe's death on May 4, 1975, the Stooges, with Sitka, had planned to film a movie called The Jet Set. This was later produced with the surviving members of the Ritz Brothers and released as Blazing Stewardesses.

In the early 1970s, with Moe's approval, DeRita attempted to form a "new" Three Stooges. He recruited burlesque and vaudeville veterans Mousie Garner and Frank Mitchell to replace Moe and Larry for nightclub engagements. Their act was poorly received, quickly ending the group.

== Personal life ==
DeRita was married twice. His first marriage was to a chorus girl named Bonnie Brooks, born Esther M. Hartenstine. They were married from July 13, 1935, until her death on September 6, 1965; they had no children. DeRita married his second wife, Jean Sullivan, the following year on December 28.

DeRita was the only member of the Stooges who was not Jewish.

== Death ==
DeRita died of pneumonia on July 3, 1993, aged 83. He was residing at the Motion Picture & Television Country House and Hospital in Woodland Hills, California, at the time of his death. He was the last Stooge to be born, the last Stooge to join the Three Stooges, and the last to die. DeRita is interred in a grave at the Pierce Brothers Valhalla Memorial Park Cemetery in North Hollywood, California.

== Legacy ==
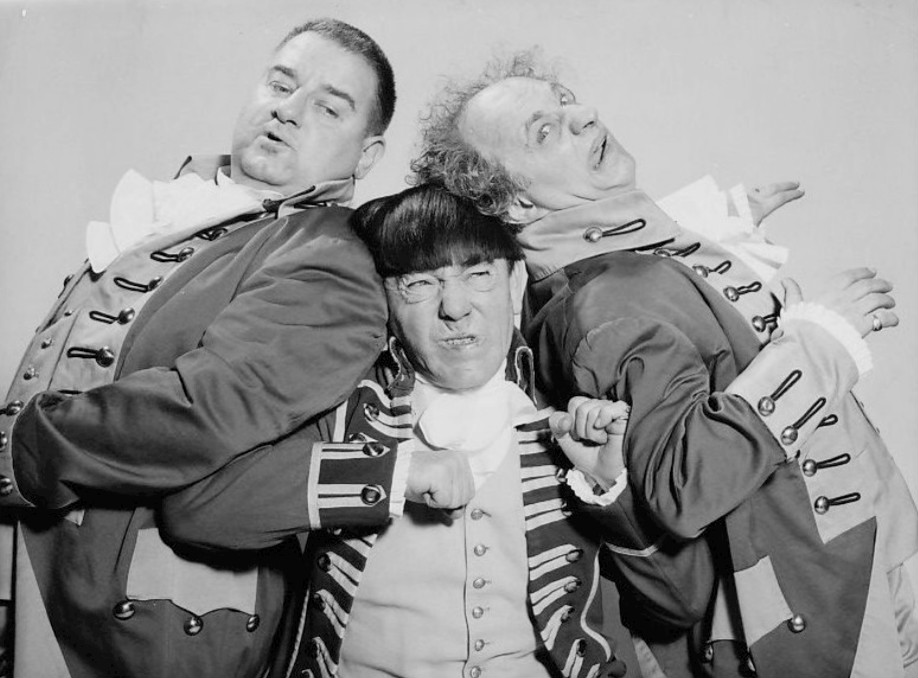
Curly Joe DeRita with Moe Howard and Larry Fine in 1959

Although DeRita enjoyed working with Moe and Larry and made a living doing it, he was not a fan of the Stooges' humor. He once told an interviewer:

I don't think the Stooges were funny. I'm not putting you on, I'm telling the truth—they were physical, but they just didn't have any humor about them. Take, for instance, Laurel and Hardy. I can watch their films and I still laugh at them and maybe I've seen them four or five times before. But when I see that pie or seltzer bottle, I know that it's not just lying around for no reason. It's going to be used for something. I was with the Stooges for 12 years and it was a very pleasant association but I just don't think they were funny.

On April 24, 2000, ABC aired a television movie about the Stooges, with actor Peter Callan playing DeRita.

== Filmography ==
Year	Title	Role	Notes
1943	Thank Your Lucky Stars	Meek Man	Uncredited
1944	The Doughgirls	The Stranger	Uncredited
1945	The Sailor Takes a Wife	Waiter	Uncredited
1946	People Are Funny	Mr. Hinkley	Uncredited
1946	The French Key	Detective Fox	
1946	High School Hero	Tiny	
1946	Slappily Married	Joe Bates	Short film, Joe DeRita series
1947	The Good Bad Egg	Mr. Priggle	Short film, Joe DeRita series
1947	Wedlock Deadlock	Eddie	Short film, Joe DeRita series
1948	Jitter Bughouse	Joe	Short film, Joe DeRita series
1948	Coroner Creek	Jack, Bartender	Uncredited
1953	The War of the Worlds	MP in jeep	Uncredited
1958	The Bravados	Mr. Simms	Uncredited
1959	Have Rocket, Will Travel	Curly Joe	
1961	Snow White and the Three Stooges	Curly Joe	
1962	The Three Stooges Meet Hercules	Curly Joe	
1962	The Three Stooges in Orbit	Curly Joe	
1963	The Three Stooges Go Around the World in a Daze	Curly Joe	
1963	The Three Stooges Scrapbook	Curly Joe	Short, unsold TV pilot never released
1963	It's a Mad, Mad, Mad, Mad World	Fireman Curly Joe	Cameo, credited as part of 'The Three Stooges'
1963	4 for Texas	Curly Joe	Uncredited
1965	The Outlaws Is Coming	Curly Joe	
1965	The New Three Stooges	Curly Joe	TV series
1965	Danny Thomas Meets the Comics	Curly Joe	TV movie
1966	The Adventures of Ozzie & Harriet	Man with Lollipop	TV series, Uncredited
1967	Off to See the Wizard	"Three Men in a Tub"	TV series
1968	Star Spangled Salesman	Curly Joe	Short film
1970	Kook's Tour	Curly Joe	Unsold TV series pilot (final film role)
