= The Three Stooges Scrapbook =

1960 unsold American television miniseries starring the Three Stooges

- Genre: Sitcom; Comedy
- Based on: The Three Stooges
- Written by: Elwood Ullman
- Directed by: Sidney Miller
- Starring: Moe Howard; Larry Fine; Joe DeRita; Emil Sitka; Marjorie Eaton; Edward Innes; Albert Grazier; Mel Blanc (uncredited)
- Narrated by: Don Lamond
- Theme music composer: George Duning; Stanley Styne
- Opening theme: "I Want to Be a Stooge"
- Ending theme: "I Want to Be a Stooge"
- Composer: Paul Dunlap
- Country of origin: United States
- Original language: English
- No. of episodes: 1

Production
- Producer: Norman Maurer
- Editor: Chuck Gladden
- Running time: 25 minutes
- Production companies: Normandy Productions, Inc.

The Three Stooges Scrapbook is an unaired 1960 television pilot starring The Three Stooges (Moe Howard, Larry Fine and Curly-Joe DeRita). In the opening title and Hollywood trade advertisements, the show's title is spelled without "The", including a promotional photograph of the Stooges holding an oversized scrapbook. The episode's plot finds the men evicted from a rooming house and finding refuge in the home of a mad inventor (played by Emil Sitka). Later, the trio dashes off to a television studio to host their new series ("Three Stooges Scrapbook"). Part of the show within a show is an animated short called It's Mutiny that imagines them as part of Christopher Columbus' crew.

The Three Stooges Scrapbook was filmed in color and produced by Norman Maurer (Moe Howard’s son-in-law), who hoped to establish a weekly program for children’s television. When no network wished to pursue the project as a series, Maurer divided the pilot into two short films that were released to theaters in 1963. Maurer also reprinted the live-action scenes in black and white and incorporated them into the 1962 feature film The Three Stooges in Orbit.

The complete pilot was released as a bonus feature on Sony's The Three Stooges 20-Disc Blu-Ray Collection.

== Cast ==
- Moe Howard as Moe
- Larry Fine as Larry
- Joe DeRita as Curly-Joe
- Emil Sitka as Prof. Dolottle
- Marjorie Eaton as Mrs. McGinnis
- Don Lamond as Announcer/Stage Manager
- Edward Innes as Landlord
- Albert Grazier as Butler
- Mel Blanc as the voice of Christopher Columbus, Manuel, and the Chief (uncredited)

== Credits ==
- Director: Sidney Miller
- Writer: Elwood Ullman
- Producer: Norman Maurer
- Starring: Larry Fine, Moe Howard, Joe DeRita
- Featuring: Emil Sitka, Marjorie Eaton, Don Lamond, Edward Innes, Albert Grazier
- Music Composer and Conductor: Paul Dunlap
- Title Song: George Dunning (music) and Stanley Styne (lyrics)
- Vocals: The Eligibles
- Director of Photography: Hal McAlpin
- Film Editor: Chuck Gladden
- Assistant Director: Harry Slott
- Associate Producer: Pat Somerset
- Chief Electrician: Robert Petzoldt
- Sound Recorder: Leon Leon
- Property Master: Chick Chicetti
- Set Decorator: Frank Lombardo
- Script Supervisor: Joe Franklin
- Makeup: Ted Coodley
- Costumer: Jack Angel
- Grip: Tex Hayes
- Laboratory: Consolidated Film Industries
- Sound: Glen Glenn
- Costume Designer: Sascha Brastoff

== Book ==
The Three Stooges Scrapbook is also the title of a 1982 book written by Three Stooges experts Jeff and Greg Lenburg and Joan Howard Maurer (Moe Howard's daughter and Norman Maurer's wife).

== See also ==
- Kook's Tour – another unaired Three Stooges pilot from 1970 that was initially released through the home-movie market and later on VHS and DVD.
