= Town drunk =

Stock character; male in a small town who is drunk more often than sober

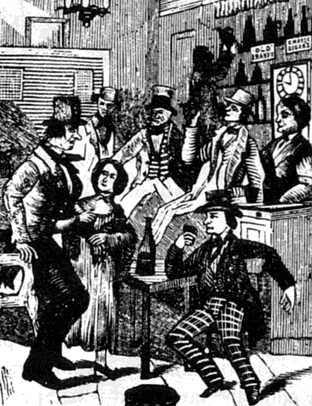
The depraved inhabitants of a tavern, from a nineteenth-century temperance play.

The town drunk (also called a tavern fool) is a stock character in Anglo-Saxon culture, almost always male, who is drunk more often than exhibiting sobriety.

The town drunk is frequently depicted in a humorous light, often portrayed as a harmless and lovable character whose social failings stem from their excessive consumption of alcohol. However, some portrayals can be more nuanced, exploring the social and personal costs associated with alcoholism.

== Uses in fiction ==
In fiction, the town drunk character serves a number of functions.

The town drunk may serve merely as a moral example and object lesson on the evils of drunkenness. This approach to the character is associated with the temperance movement, and peaked at the start of the twentieth century. The Prohibition film Ten Nights in a Barroom portrays the inevitable fall into destitute drunkenness of a person who dared to take that "Fatal Glass of Beer", the title of another period drama working this vein. A town drunk appears in Our Town by Thornton Wilder. Pap Finn in The Adventures of Huckleberry Finn is another example. In modern fiction, which tends to reflect the contemporary influences of the sobriety movement, the town drunk may get sober and set about revitalizing his life.

The town drunk may play the role of the fool as a source of comic relief. "Otis" from The Andy Griffith Show is this type of town drunk, as is the character of Bobby Singer in The CW series Supernatural, as well as many of the denizens of Moe's Tavern from The Simpsons such as Barney Gumble. In 1971's The Andromeda Strain the only adult survivor is a Town Drunk. In Shakespeare's Macbeth, the Porter who appears in Act II, Scene 3, is also a type of "comic relief" drunk who serves to temporarily lighten the mood of the play right after a heinous regicide has taken place.

The town drunk may disrupt public meetings, either for comic effect, or by dispensing what proves to be wisdom in a garbled and comic form. Or, in this incarnation, the character may introduce the hero to some of the worldlier sorts of wisdom, as well as forming a contrast to his truly heroic character. One prototype for this version of the town drunk is supplied by Shakespeare's Falstaff, who appears in both parts of Henry IV and in The Merry Wives of Windsor. Another would be the drunk who appears in Team America: World Police at the low point of the film, where his drunken ramblings inspire the hero to save the world. In the 1722 Danish play Jeppe on the Hill, the eponymous wise fool main character, declares that "everybody says that Jeppe drinks, but nobody asks why Jeppe drinks"
