= Busser =

Restaurant worker

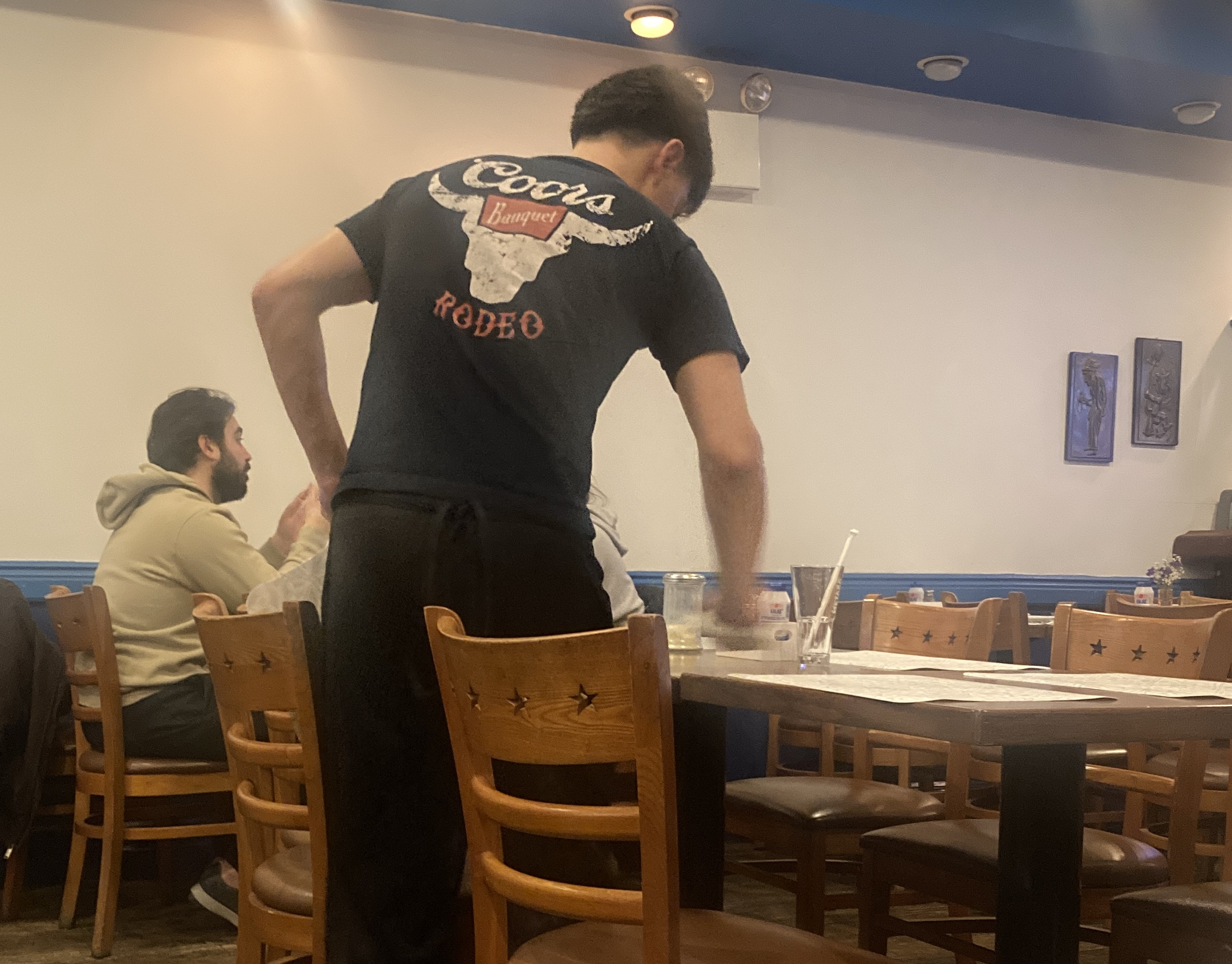
A busser clearing a table

In North America, a busser, sometimes known as a busboy or busgirl, is a person in the restaurant and catering industry clearing tables, taking dirty dishes to the dishwasher, setting tables, refilling glasses, and otherwise assisting the waiting staff. In British English, the terms commis waiter, commis boy, and waiter's assistant are more common. The term for a busser in the classic brigade de cuisine system is commis de débarrasseur, or simply débarrasseur. Bussers are typically placed beneath the waiting staff in organization charts, and are sometimes an apprentice or trainee to waiting staff positions.

The United States Bureau of Labor Statistics reported that the occupation typically did not require related work experience or a high school diploma, that on-the-job training was short-term, and that the median income in 2024 for the position was US$32,670.

The duties of bussers fall under the heading of busing or bussing, an Americanism of unknown origin.

It has been claimed that the term originated in America as 'omnibus boy', a boy employed to do everything ('omni-') in a restaurant including setting and clearing tables, filling glasses, taking used dishes to the kitchen, etc.

== Job description ==
Primary functions of the busser are to clean and reset tables, carry dishes and other tableware to the kitchen, serve items such as water, coffee and bread, replenish supplies of linens, tableware and trays, and assist servers with clearing plates and other areas of table service. Other tasks include cleaning and polishing fixtures, walls, furniture and equipment, cleaning tableware, cleaning food service areas, mopping and vacuuming floors, cleaning up spills, removing empty bottles and trash, and scraping and stacking dirty dishes.

== Etiquette ==
One guide to manners advised that bussers should not speak to or interrupt those being served, and to simply refill glasses at the table rather than asking if customers would like more water. Likewise, it advises customers against engaging bussers and waiting staff in distracting conversations, as they are often busy. A business etiquette guide suggests that customers should refer to bussers and waiting staff with the gender-neutral terms busser and server rather than busboy or waiter. However, this has not been widely taken up outside of the industry. It also says that the busser is the employee that must be informed if items like a water glass or piece of flatware is missing.

== Tip income ==
Bussers are not traditionally tipped directly in the United States, but restaurants may employ "tip pooling" or "tip sharing" arrangements, in which a portion of servers' tips are shared with other restaurant service staff.

In the United States, tip sharing may be either voluntary, where waitstaff give a portion of their tips to coworkers as they see fit, or mandatory, where the employer sets a formula by which tips must be shared with coworkers such as bussers and bartenders. In the UK the pool of tips is classically known as the 'Tronc', from the French meaning collecting box. Federal Department of Labor regulations do not allow restaurants to include managers in tip sharing, and inclusion of "back of the house" employees such as dishwashers and cooks has been the subject of legal disputes since 2009. Recipients of tips in shared tip restaurants may be paid a "tip-credit wage", below the ordinary minimum wage in the United States, if the amount of shared tips in a pay period brings their average pay to the minimum wage. Federal subminimum wage is set at $2.13 per hour, though state and local laws may require higher rates. California, for example, requires tipped employees be paid full minimum wage.

A spokesperson for restaurant operator Darden Restaurants, which incorporated tip-sharing in 2011 at their Olive Garden and Red Lobster chains, said that it was more consistent and fair "to recognize everyone who delivers a guest experience", and noted that the lower hourly base wage for bartenders and bussers offered "the opportunity to ultimately earn more", depending on a restaurant's volume of tips.

== Notable former bussers ==
- Alec Baldwin, American actor, producer, and comedian, was a busser at Studio 54, a New York City disco.
- Arthur Bremer, American failed assassin of George Wallace in 1972, and whose diary became the basis for the movie Taxi Driver, was demoted from busser to custodian at the Milwaukee Athletic Club when he was caught talking to himself.
- Jacques Chirac, former President of France, worked as a busser and waiter in a Howard Johnson's restaurant while attending summer school at Harvard University.
- Robert Downey Jr., American actor, worked as a busser at a restaurant in New York City for three years, because he was "too sweaty" to work as a waiter.
- Richard Feynman, American physicist, experimented with ways to optimize dish-stacking while working as a busser during the summer growing up.
- Redd Foxx, American comedian and actor, worked as a busser and dishwasher at a famous Harlem eatery called Jimmy's Chicken Shack. He was friends with Malcolm X, who then worked there as a waiter, and who later described Foxx as "the funniest dishwasher on this earth".
- Langston Hughes, American writer and poet, dubbed the "busser poet" by journalists in 1925 after he left three of his poems beside the plate of famed poet Vachel Lindsay at the hotel where he worked, who then read the poems at a large poetry reading later that evening.
- George Kirby, American comedian, singer and actor, worked as a busser at Chicago's Club DeLisa for $13 per week, until his comedic impersonations earned him a trial on the club's stage, which launched his comedy career.
- Jerry Lewis, American comedian and actor, worked as a busser at Brown's Hotel in the Catskills, where he would try to get laughs from diners. When he later teamed up with Dean Martin to do live shows, a signature bit had Lewis playing an inept busser, interrupting the suave Martin's singing numbers, an act revisited years later in a scene from their eighth film, Scared Stiff.
- Samin Nosrat, enrolled at the University of California, Berkeley, in 1997, majoring in English. As a sophomore in 2000, she ate dinner at Chez Panisse and immediately decided to work there as a busser. Nosrat eventually worked her way up to the restaurant kitchen, becoming a cook and working with Alice Waters, who described her as "America's next great cooking teacher".
- Bree Olson, American pornographic actress, worked as a busser at age 15.
- Al Pacino, American actor and director, worked as a busser among a series of low-paying jobs to fund his acting studies.
- Chris Rock, American comedian and actor, worked as a busser at a Red Lobster restaurant in Queens, New York; both Red Lobster and "a one-legged busboy" featured among his later jokes.
- Jon Stewart, American comedian, writer and host of The Daily Show, worked as a busser at a Mexican restaurant. Stewart named his production company Busboy Productions.
- Rex Tillerson, American businessman, Secretary of State in the Donald Trump administration, worked as a busser at age 14.
- Oscar Tschirky, American maître d'hôtel of Manhattan's Waldorf-Astoria Hotel who created the Waldorf salad, began his career as a busser.

== In popular culture ==
- A 1991 Seinfeld episode entitled "The Busboy" is centered on a busser who is fired due to George Costanza's accidental actions.
