= Elwood Ullman =

American screenwriter (1903–1985)

- Born: May 27, 1903; Memphis, Tennessee, U.S.
- Died: October 11, 1985 (aged 82); Hollywood, California, U.S.
- Years active: 1932-1974

Elwood Ullman (May 27, 1903 — October 11, 1985) was an American film comedy writer most famous for his credits on The Three Stooges shorts and many other low-budget comedies.

== Career ==
A native of Memphis, Tennessee, Ullman chose a writing career, supplying humorous articles for magazines in the 1930s. He submitted script ideas to Columbia Pictures, and the studio assigned him to the short-subject department. Producer Jules White teamed Ullman with Al Giebler, a former sight-gag writer for Mack Sennett in the silent-film days. Ullman was soon completing scripts by himself, and wrote for most of Columbia's short subject stars, including The Three Stooges, Buster Keaton, Charley Chase, Harry Langdon, and Hugh Herbert.

Ullman worked closely with Columbia producer Hugh McCollum and writer-director Edward Bernds until McCollum and Bernds left the studio in 1952. Bernds then became a writer-director for The Bowery Boys, and hired Ullman to write for the popular feature-length comedies.

Ullman and Bernds were nominated for an Oscar in 1955 for the film High Society. Unfortunately the academy had confused the high-budget Bing Crosby-Grace Kelly feature with Ullman's work on a Bowery Boys movie of the same name. Ullman and Bernds declined the nomination but were permitted to keep the certificates of recognition.

Ullman continued to work with Bernds into the 1960s, contributing to several Three Stooges feature films including The Three Stooges Meet Hercules and The Three Stooges in Orbit.

== Death ==
Ullman died of heart attack in Hollywood, California on October 11, 1985, at age 82.
