= Eilendorf (Aachen) =

- Borough of Aachen
- Coat of arms
- Interactive map of Eilendorf
- Location within Germany Location within North Rhine-Westphalia
- Coordinates: 50°46′46″N 6°9′45″E
- Country: Germany
- State: North Rhine-Westphalia
- District: Urban district
- City: Aachen

Area
  - Total: 6.84 km^{2} (2.64 sq mi)
- Elevation: 170–220 m (560–720 ft)

Population (2020-12-31)
  - Total: 15,863
  - Density: 2,320/km^{2} (6,010/sq mi)
- Time zone: UTC+01:00 (CET)
  - Summer (DST): UTC+02:00 (CEST)
- Postal codes: 52080
- Dialling codes: 0241

Eilendorf is a borough of Aachen, Germany, that has around 15000 inhabitants. The communities of Eilendorf and Nirm (both contained within the district of Eilendorf) share a border with the other Aachen boroughs of Brand, Aachen-Mitte (Rothe Erde), and Haaren (with the town of Verlautenheide), as well as Atsch in Stolberg.

== History ==
The first written mention of Eilendorf occurs in 1238, in a donation registry noting a gift from the Abbot Florenz of Kornelimünster Abbey to St. Adalbert Church in Aachen. It developed around a smithsonite mine which today is no longer in operation, though a mining symbol still appears on the Eilendorf coat of arms. In addition, there was a dolomite quary as well as a line manufacturer in Eilendorf. From 1577 until 1583 Eilendorf suffered billeting, plundering and pillaging from foreign troops involved in the Cologne War, and from 1630 to 1640 the town faced the horrors of the Thirty Years' War, which was surpassed only by the ruthless war of conquest waged by Louis XIV of France in 1678. As a result of the French Revolution, the Kornelimünster Abbey met its abrupt end in 1794. It was finally dissolved in 1802 when all church goods became a property of the state. By 1797, Eilendorf was already in political union with Forst, Weiern and Höfen.

The Eilendorf area stretches to the east until the Propsteier Forest and the district of Aue in Eschweiler, where in 1884 the Stolberg Main Train Station was built on a track in this area. On 1 April 1886 Eilendorf split from Forst to elect its own mayor, and the old community borders were reestablished. On 1 April 1897 the town got its own train station for commuter and freight traffic, and Eilendorf and Nirm joined together as a single political community on 27 April 1900. In 1908 the first drug store opened in town.

Until the administrative reforms that took place in the communities surrounding Aachen in 1971, Eilendorf was a self-administered town. Beginning 1 January 1972, however, it was incorporated into the city of Aachen as one of its seven districts. Today the district's administration is carried out in the former Eilendorf Rathaus.

With its integration into Aachen, town leaders saw the possibility to address "outstanding community issues in a larger context and to create the basis for a stable living environment, as this would lead to a healthy community in our time ".

=== Name ===
The place name Eilendorf is most likely derived from a given name: either from the male given name Eilo (a continuation of a reconstructed name *Agilo) or from the female given name Ilendis.

== Coat of arms ==
The Eilendorf coat of arms is divided vertically into two parts: on its left side (heraldic right) are two mining hammers crossed against a blue field, as well as a stylized viola. Its right (heraldic left) contains the Cornelius horn (inherited from the nearby Kornelimünster Abbey) against a red field.

== Religion ==
Until 31 December 2009, Eilendorf was split into two Roman Catholic parishes: St. Severin Church, which counts among the oldest church communities in Aachen and was founded through the Kornelimünster Abbey, and St. Apollonia Church, which for a long time formed a single parish with the community at Saint Barbara Church in Rothe Erde (a section of the Aachen-Mitte district). On 1 January 2010, the self-administered churches of St. Apollonia, St. Barbara and St. Severin were merged into the new St. Severin of Eilendorf and Rothe Erde. Through this merger, there is now only a single church council and parish council, though the individual churches have retained their community committees.

=== St. Severin ===
The St. Severin Parish goes back to the founding of the Kornelimünster Abbey: at the site of an earlier (probably Romanesque) church, Abbot Hyazinth Alfons, Count von Suys (1713–1745), established a new place of worship, with the patron saint chosen then being St. Sebastian. This place of worship was replaced in 1864 after plans for a larger, three-nave church in the neoromantic style were drawn up by the Cologne master builder Heinrich Wiethase. From 1904 until 1908 a large bell tower was constructed at the church, and the original foundation stone laid by Abbot Hyazinth can still be seen within the tower. The changing of the patron saint from St. Sebastian to St. Severin occurred following the incorporation of the parish into the Archdiocese of Cologne.

=== St. Apollonia ===
The St. Apollonia Church lies on Apollonia Way in the upper village, on Heck Street. The structure was designed by Aachen architect Peter Salm and erected from 1959 until 1961. The ceremonial groundbreaking (which had been anticipated for the previous decade) finally occurred on 23 August 1959. On 24 and 25 March 1961 the church was consecrated in the name of St Apollonia by Bishop Johannes Pohlschneider. This patron saint was chosen because of the nearby Apollonia chapel, and though St Apollonia was originally established as a part of St. Severin Parish, it became its own parish on 21 January 1969. The church houses a mechanical Weimbs organ built in 1988.

=== Additional religious locations ===
The Protestant Church of Reconciliation was established in 1979 as part of the community of Protestant Churches in Aachen.

There also exists a Jewish cemetery on Von-Coels Street on the outskirts of town, in the direction of Stolberg.

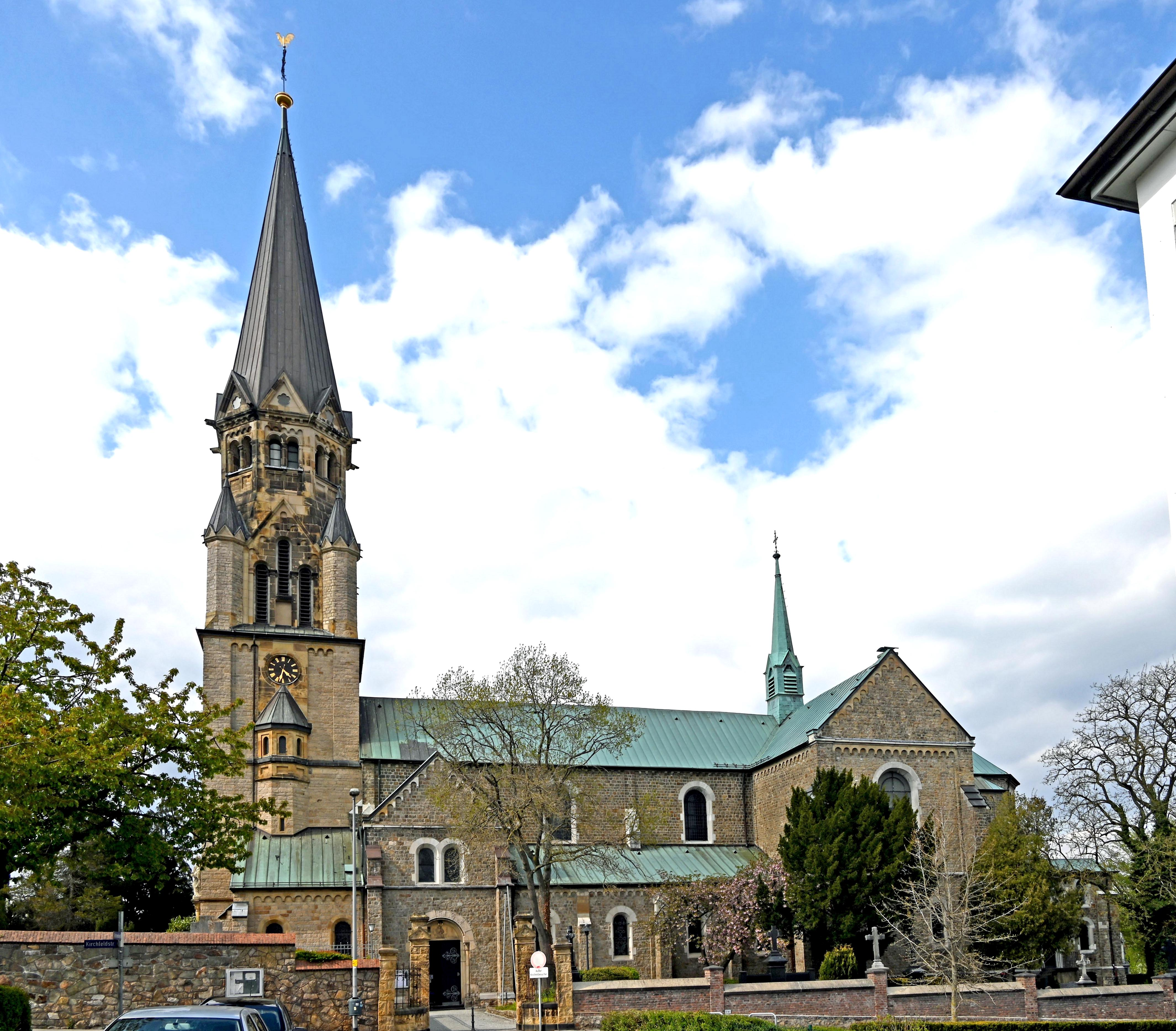
St. Severin Church

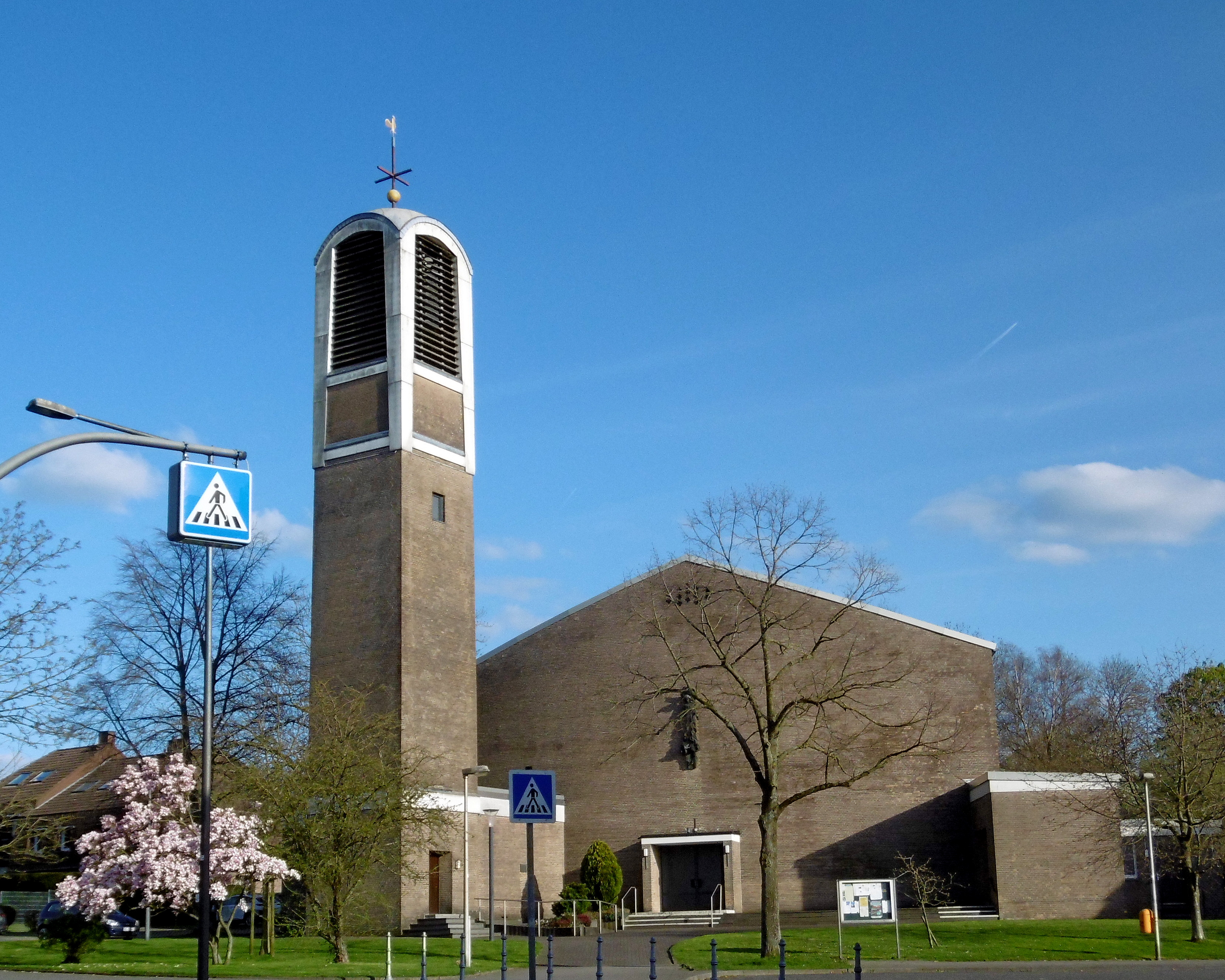
St. Apollonia Church

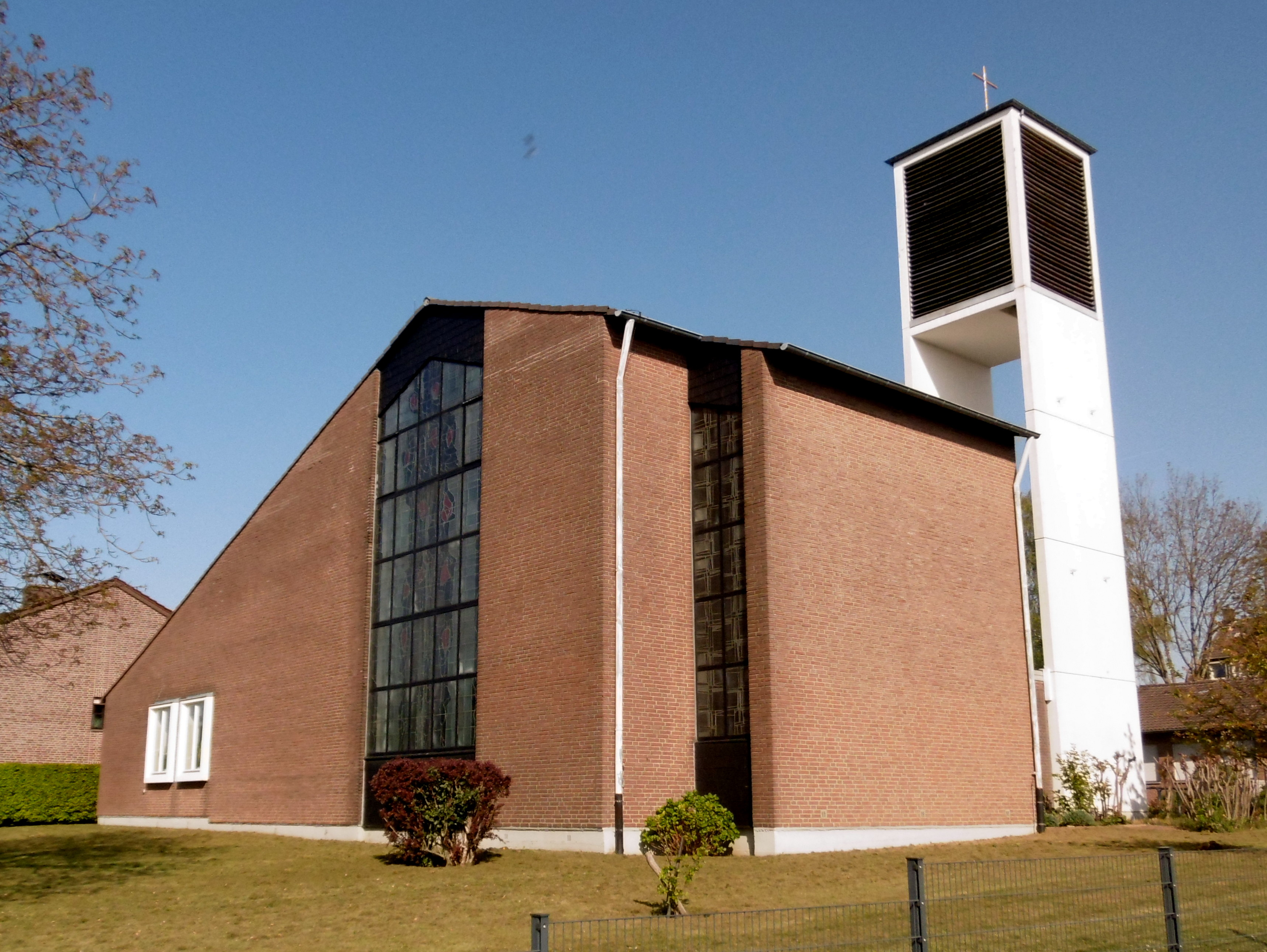
Protestant Church of Reconciliation

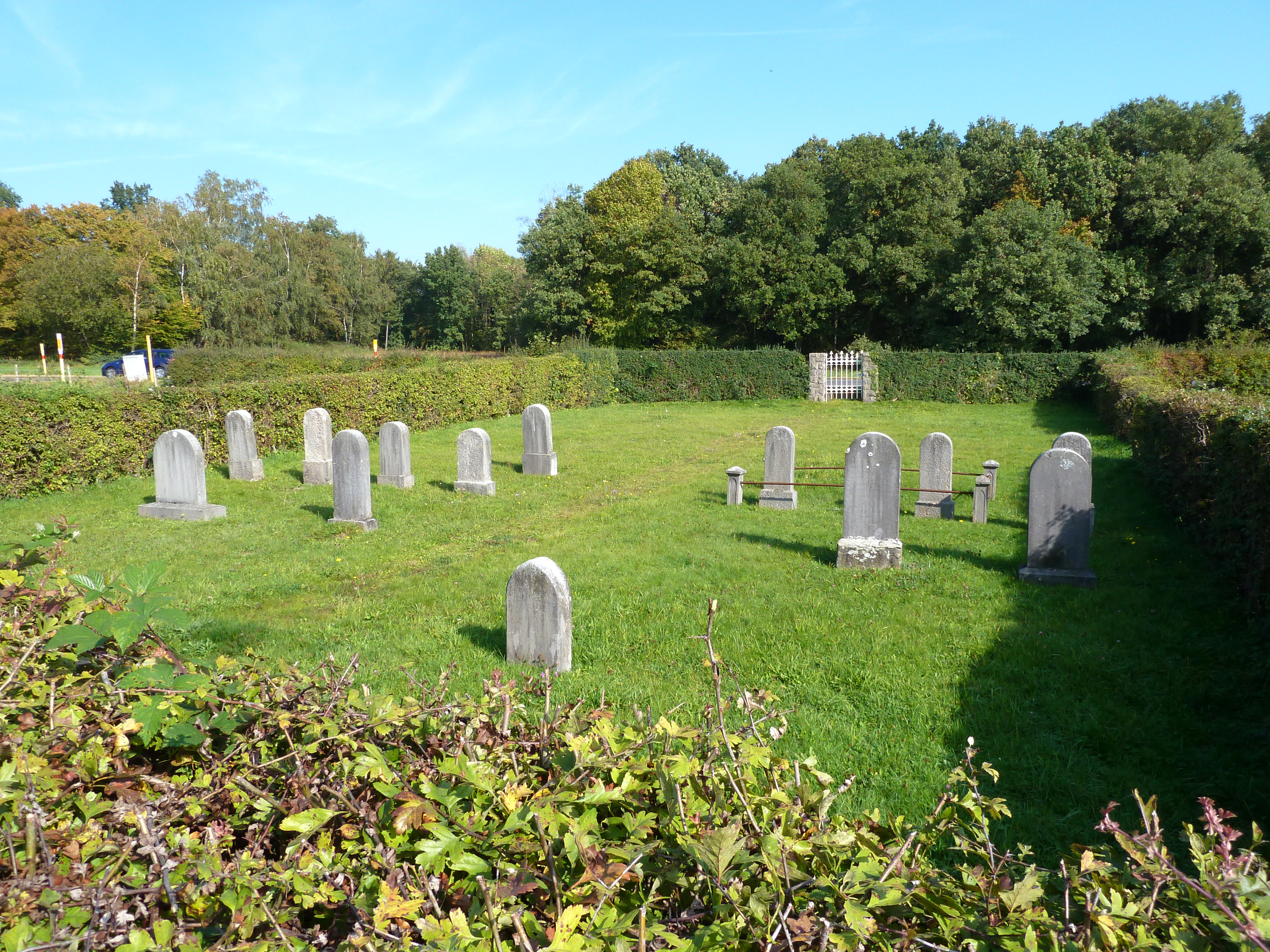
Jewish Cemetery in Eilendorf

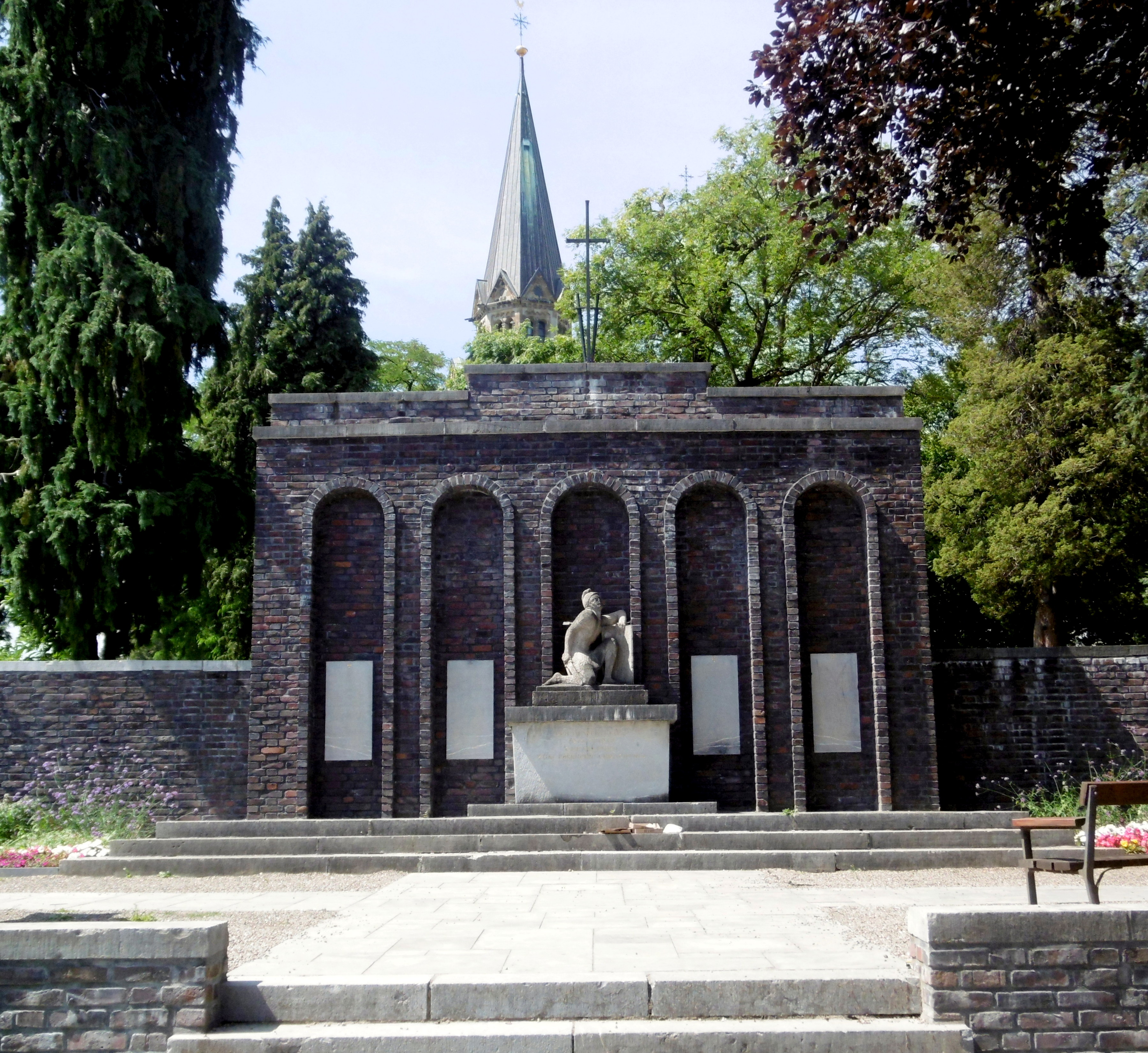
World War I Memorial in Eilendorf

== Geography and architecture ==
The oldest preserved structure in the area is the Pannhaus Brewery, which was formerly associated with an abbey. A cornerstone of the structure that was likely added later served in former times as the pranger (or pillory) of the village.

Even 50 years ago, there were farms and fields between Aachen and Eilendorf, but now a seamless transition between the two areas exists as a result of new construction connecting the industrial areas of Rothe Erde and Eilendorf South together.

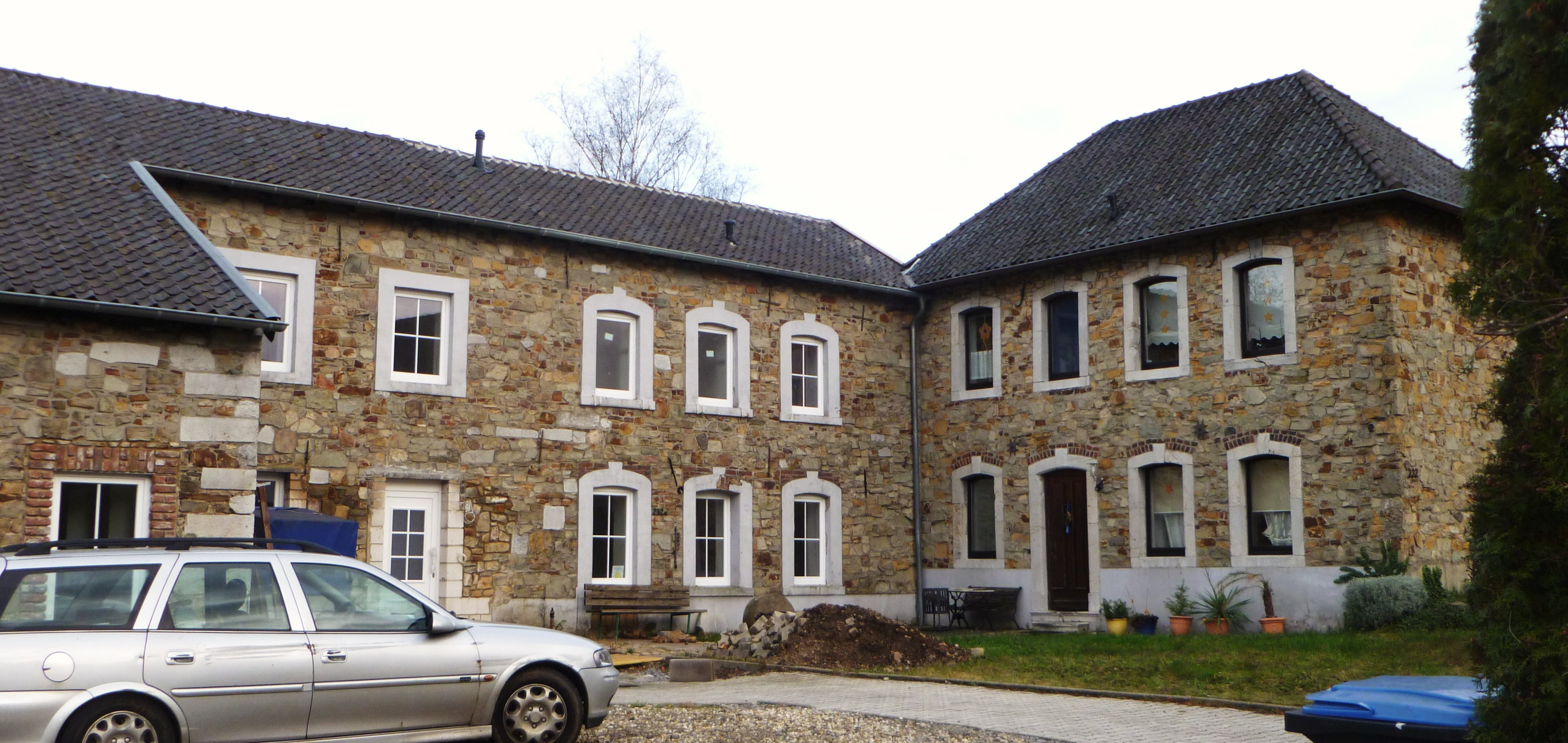
The Nirm Mill

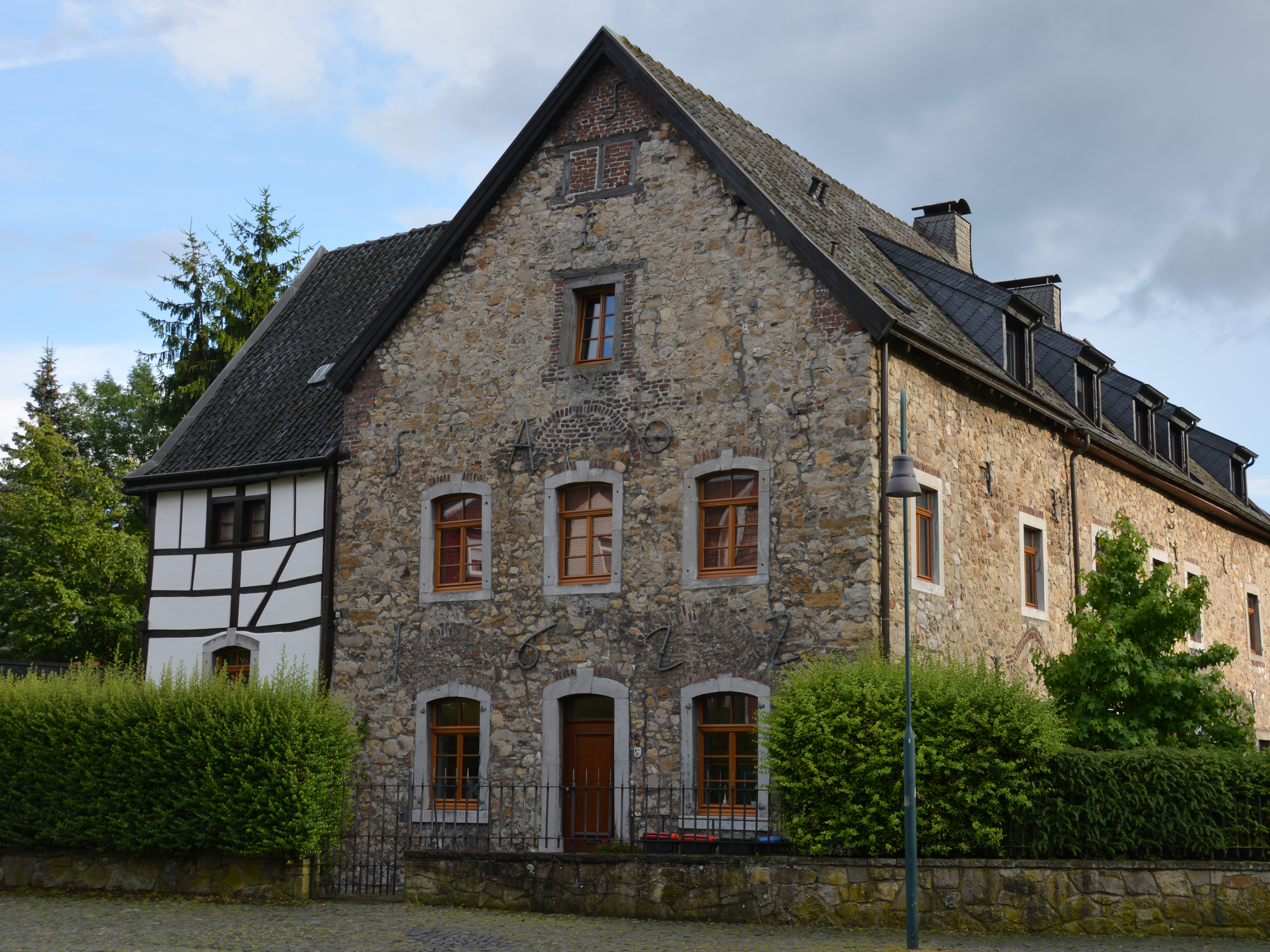
Pannhaus

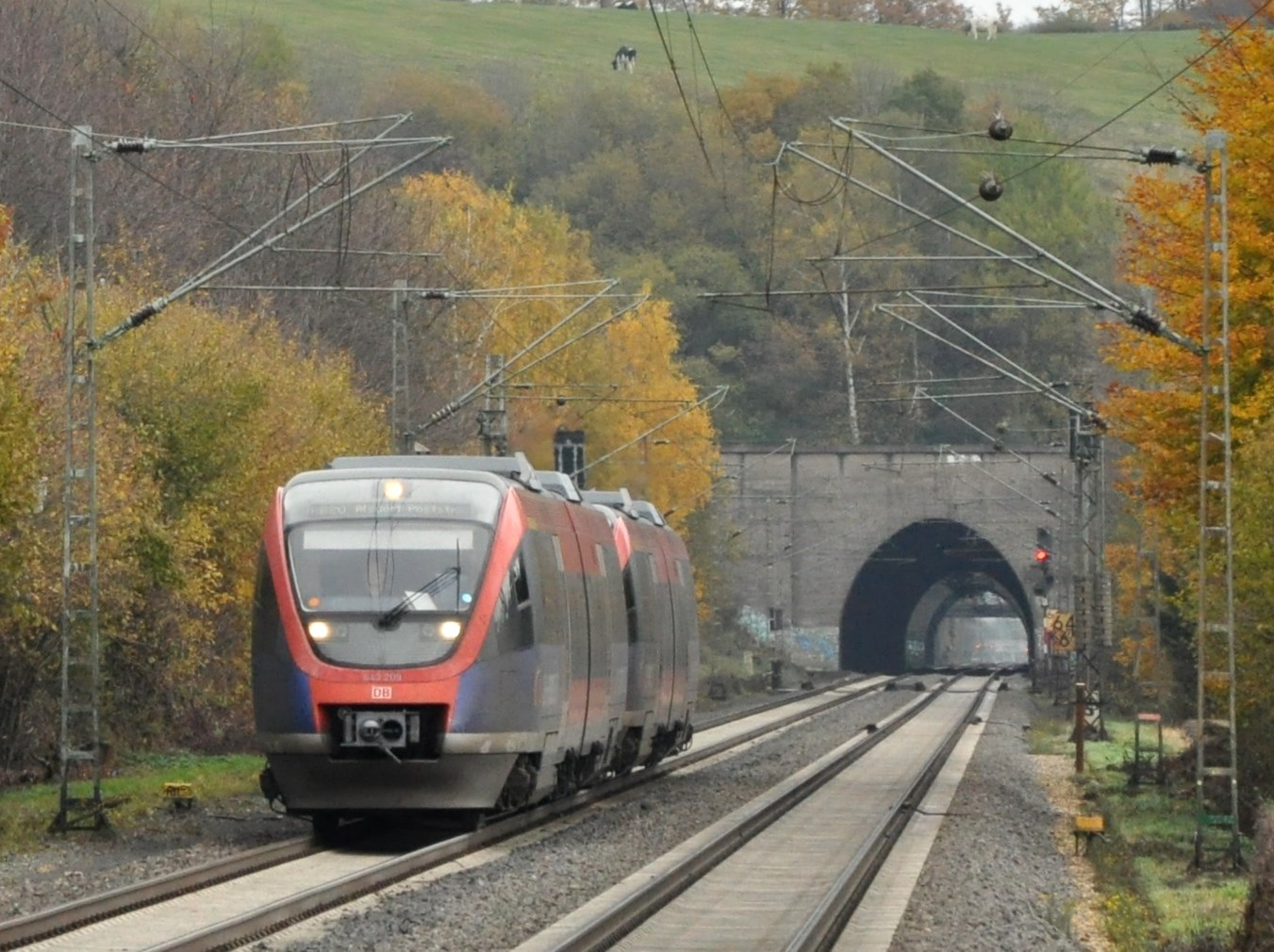
The Eilendorf Tunnel

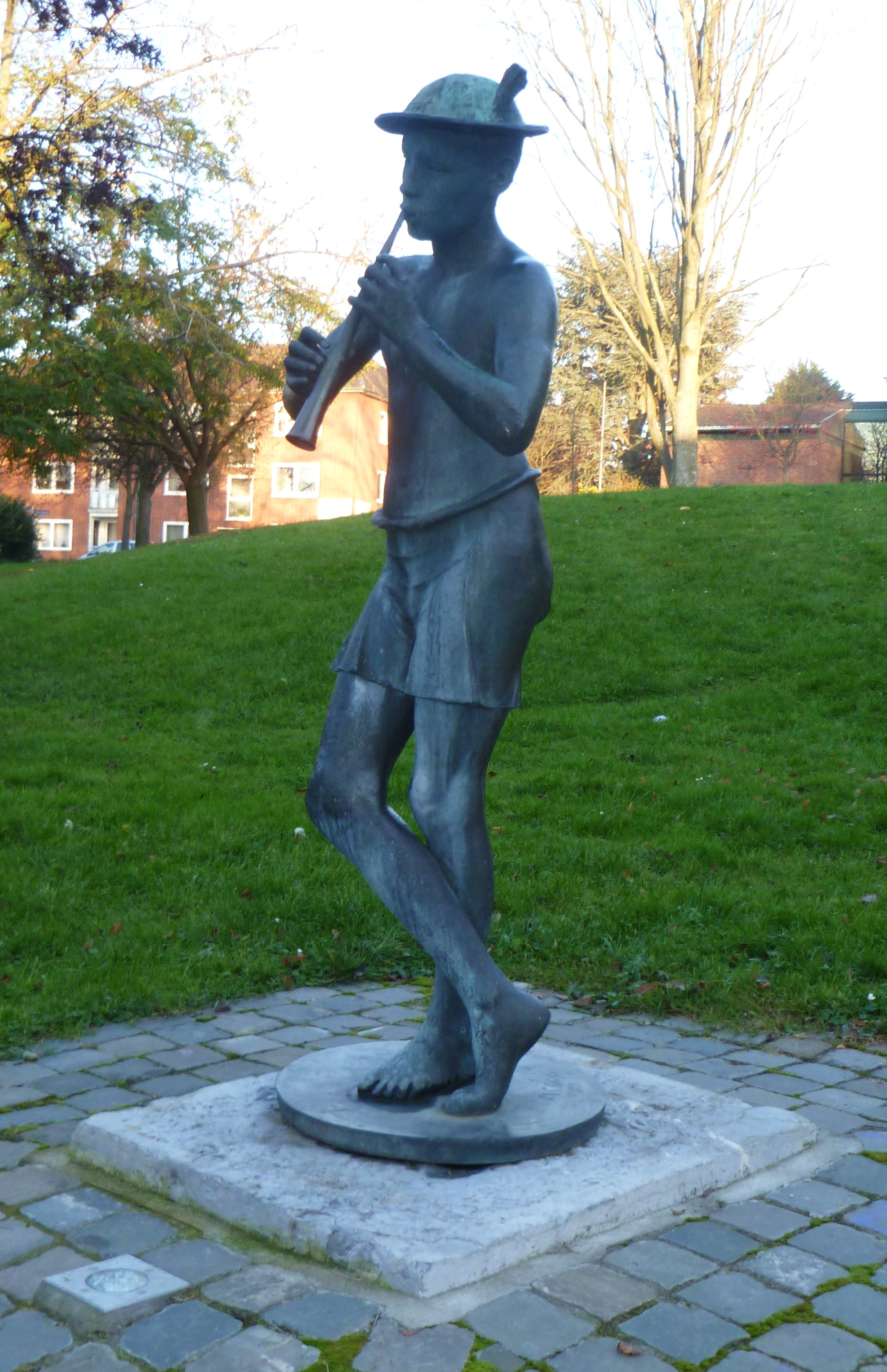
Flute Player

== Landscape ==
The highest point in Eilendorf is known as the Wolfsberg or Gottes Segen (God Bless) and rises 230 meters above sea level. From its top, one can see all over Aachen and the Aachen Forest (including its highest point, the Klausberg). On clear days, it is also possible to see as far as the Eifel, which is a low mountain range to the south. In the winter, the hill is used for sledding, and in the Summer, for sunbathing.

Through the area in the direction of the Eifel, there is a 50 metres (160 feet) difference in height between the Eilendorf communities of Nirm and Oberdorf.

For the most part, Eilendorf is surrounded by fields and nature except from the west, where it is connected to the Aachen-Mitte district of Rothe Erde. This green space is used mostly for cows, rather than heavily agriculture, though the number of farmers in the area has decreased dramatically over the last 50 years. Most of the fields are used for the production of hay, and the Haarbach (a small stream and tributary of the Wurm) flows northeast beneath the district of Nirm and across the train lines connecting Aachen to Eschweiler.

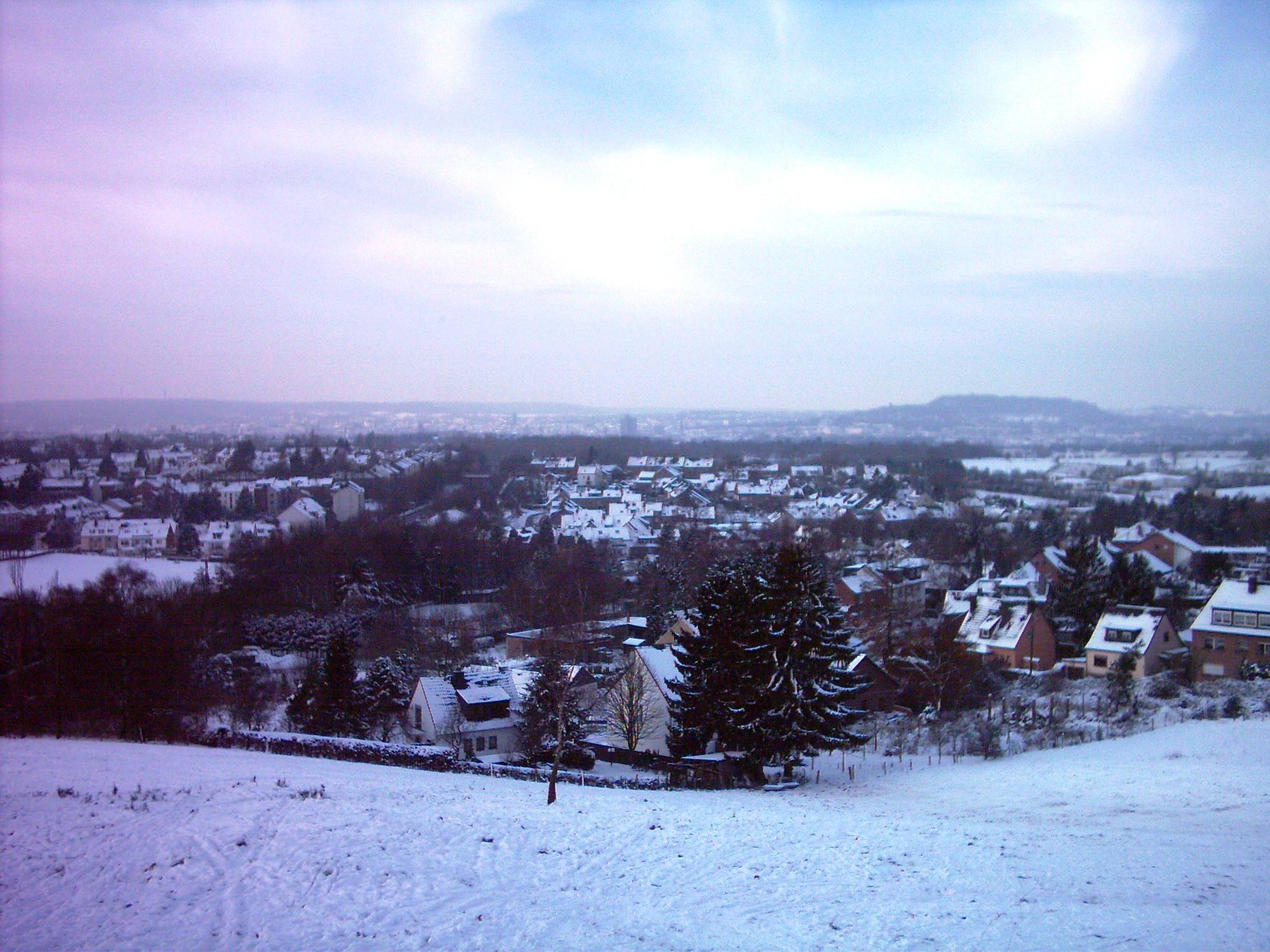
View of Eilendorf, with the Lousberg (background right) and Aachen Forest (horizon)

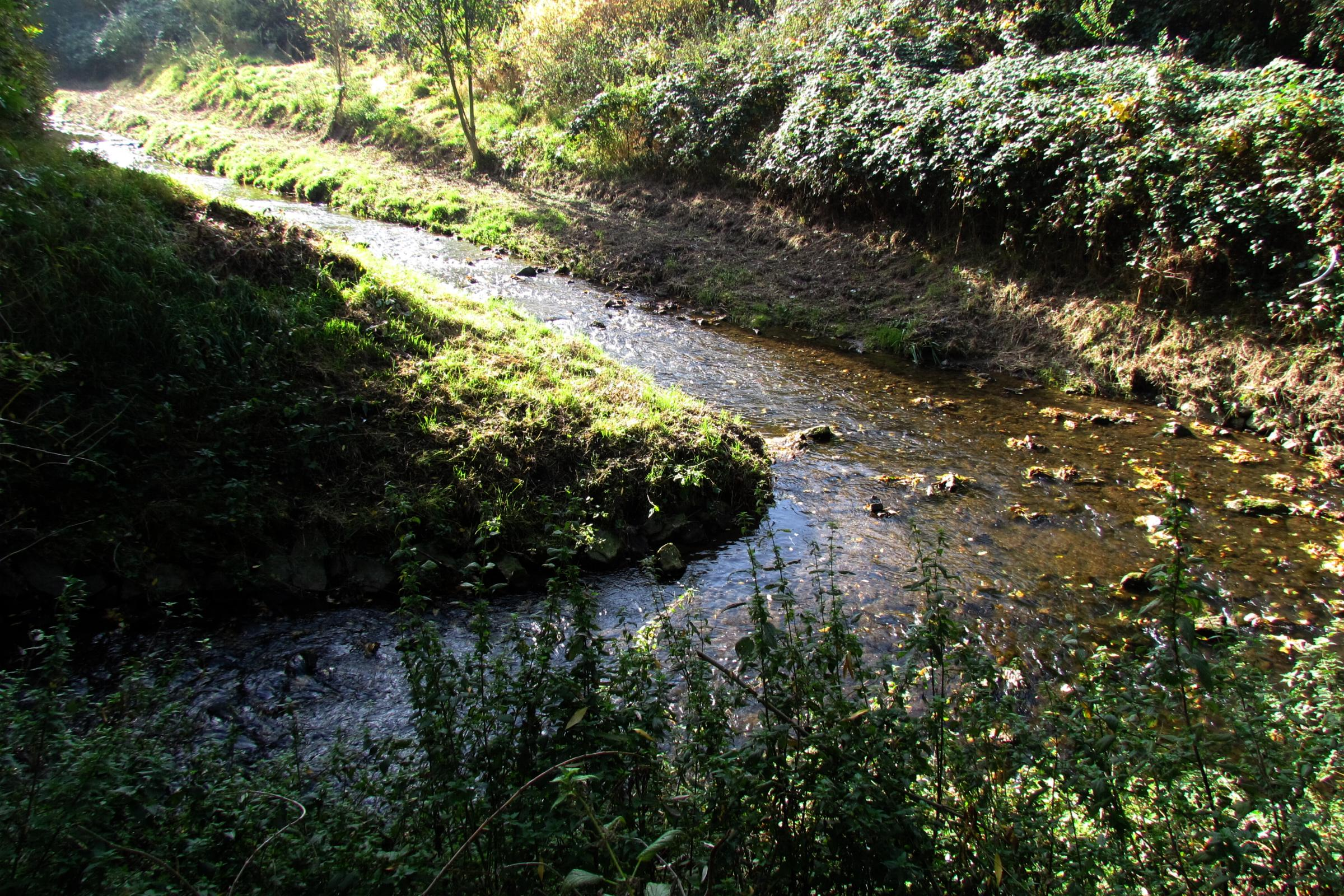
Haarbach Stream

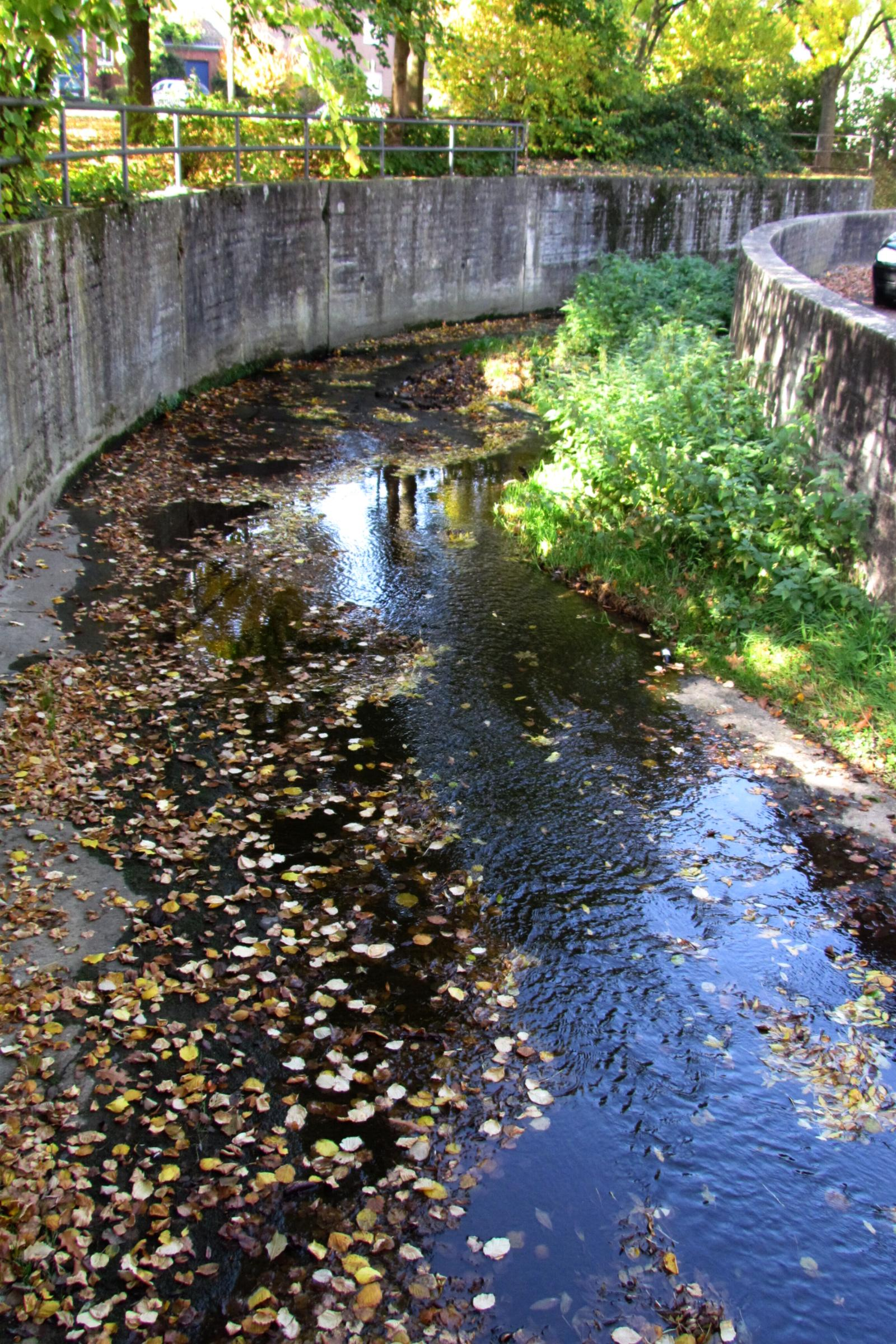
Concrete stream banks in Nirm

== Transportation ==
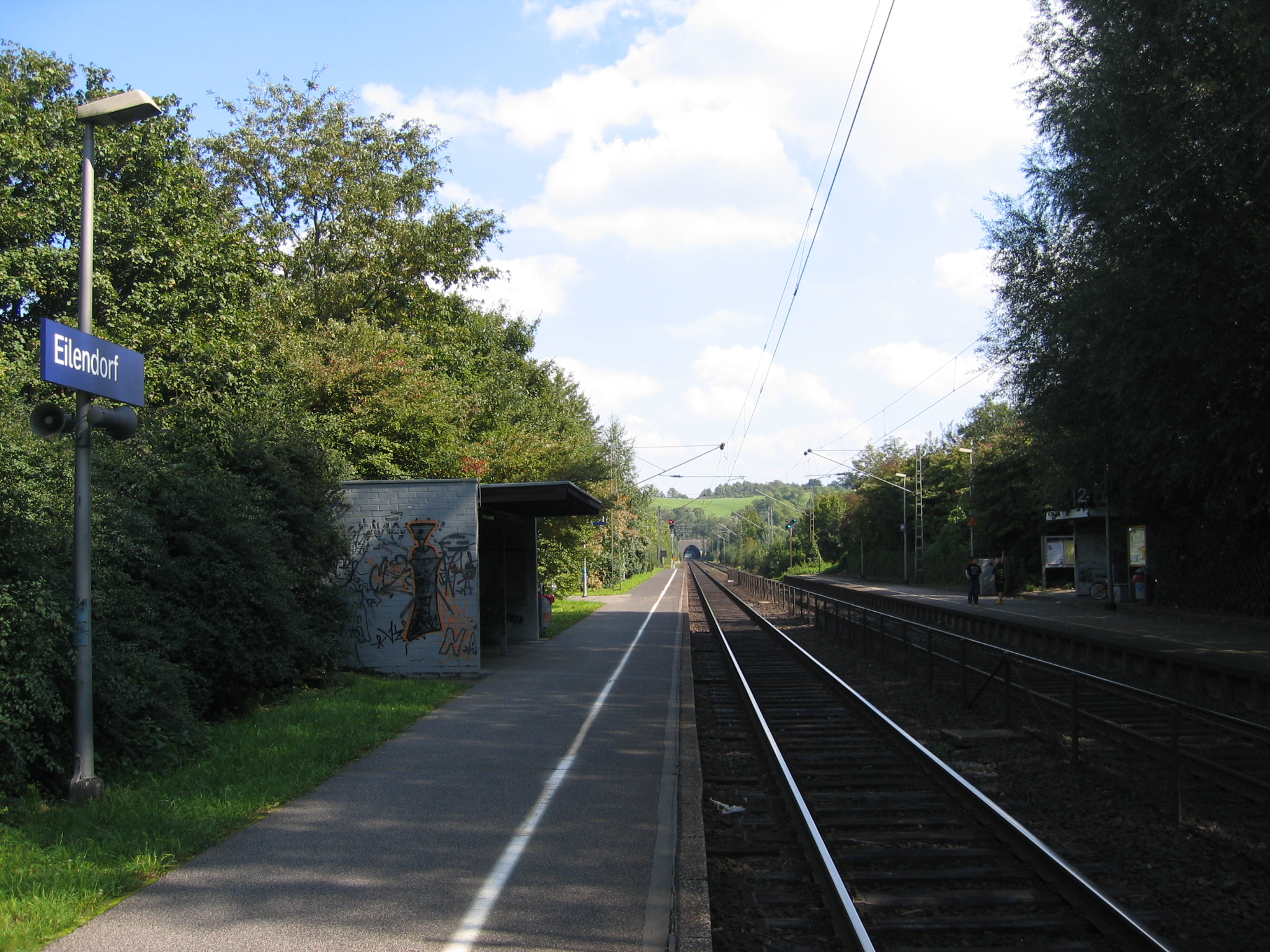
Eilendorf Train Platform

Public transport in Eilendorf is maintained by ASEAG, with bus lines 2, 12, 22, 50, and 7 (as well as 34 and 43 in the industrial parts of the district) serving the area, as well as a train platform that connects Eilendorf to Aachen and Düren. Trips to the center of Aachen by bus can take 30 minutes or longer.

=== Eilendorf Train Station ===
The Eilendorf Platform (which was a train station, until the 1960s) lies on the Express Line between Cologne and Aachen, directly between the stops at Stolberg Main Train Station and the Aachen station at Rothe Erde. The station was first opened to commuter and freight traffic in 1841, under the name of Nirm, On 1 April 1897, a station building was opened at this location. and though the line is heavily traveled by Intercity-Express and Thalys trains, only trains of the Euregiobahn and NRW-Express services stop at the station. It takes approximately three minutes to reach the first Aachen station at Rothe Erde, and seven minutes to reach the Aachen Hauptbahnhof (or Main Train Station).

Line	Service	Route		
RB 20	Euregiobahn	Heerlen / Geilenkirchen^{*} / Alsdorf-Poststraße – Alsdorf-Annapark – Herzogenrath – Aachen – Eilendorf – Stolberg (Rhineland) (Portion working)	– Stolberg Altstadt	Every half-hour
RB 20	Euregiobahn	Heerlen / Geilenkirchen^{*} / Alsdorf-Poststraße – Alsdorf-Annapark – Herzogenrath – Aachen – Eilendorf – Stolberg (Rhineland) (Portion working)	– Eschweiler Talbahnhof – Langerwehe (– Düren)	Every half-hour
RB 1	NRW-Express	Aachen Hbf – Aachen-Rothe Erde − Eilendorf – Stolberg (Rhineland) Hbf – Eschweiler – Langerwehe station – Düren – Horrem – Köln-Ehrenfeld – Köln Hbf (– Düsseldorf Hbf)		Mo – Fr, each trip made by two pairs of trains

^{*}: Monday and Fridays mornings, only two trips per direction

== Notable persons ==
- Heinz Bennent, (1921–2011), German actor

== Works cited ==
- Harry Seipolt: NS-Zwangssterilisation – Der Fall Maria und Wilhelm Sistermann, in: Eilendorfer Heimatblätter, Jg. 1996: Bd. 14, S. 57–68.
- Christian Quix: Geschichte des Karmeliten-Klosters, der Villa Harna, der Gelehrtenschulen in Aachen vor Einführung des Jesuiten-Gymnasiums der vormaligen Herrschaft Eilendorf, J. A: Mayer (Hrsg.), (1835)
- Unser Nirm: Bildband Von damals bis heute, "Nirmer Kreis" 2001 von Manfred Brand
- Hubert Beckers, Aus der Geschichte der Pfarre St. Apollonia Aachen-Eilendorf – Ein geschichtlicher Rückblick anlässlich des Jubiläums "25 Jahre Pfarrkirche St. Apollonia" am 24. und 25. März 1986, Aachen-Eilendorf, 1986 im Eigenverlag
