= Aachen Forest =

Forest in Germany

Coordinates: 50°43′59″N 6°4′23″E

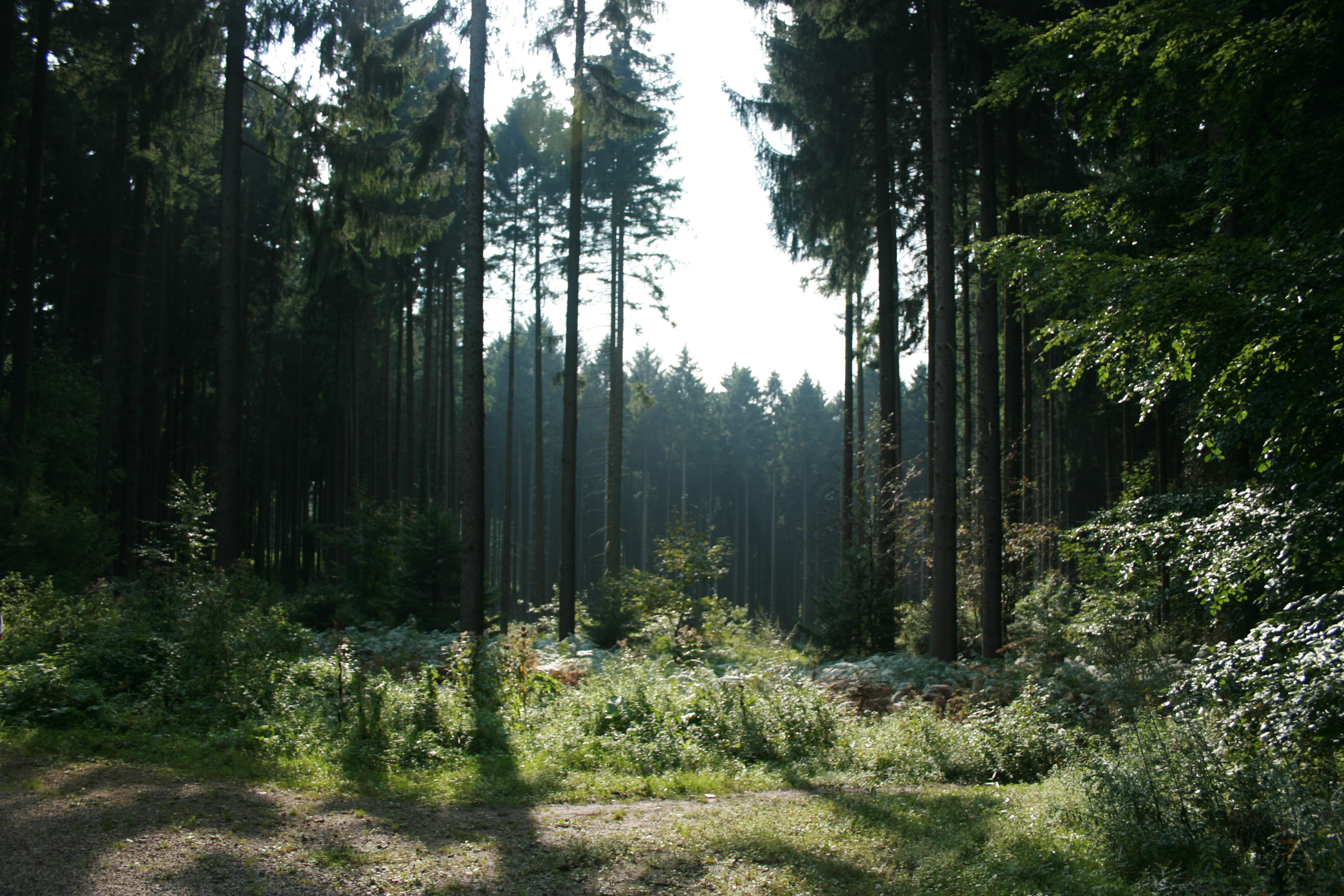
Aachen Forest, near the Zyklopensteine

Aachen Forest (German: Aachener Wald, Aachen dialect Öcher Bösch, Dutch: Akenerbos) lies about 3.7 km south of the city centre of Aachen and has an area of 2,357 ha. It essentially comprises the forest areas of the former free imperial city of Aachen south and west of the formerly independent municipalities of Burtscheid and Forst, as well as north and east of the Belgian border. Apart from a few small plots, it is all in municipal ownership. In July 2003, the Forest of Aachen was awarded the environmental seal of the Forest Stewardship Council (FSC) on the initiative of Greenpeace, which was extended in 2008 for another five years.

== Geography ==
At its widest point, Aachen Forest is about 8.2 kilometres wide, and its greatest north-south extent is about 2.5 kilometres. It lies in the transition zone between the Lower Rhine Plain and the Rhenish Massif, at an average height of 220 metres above sea level. The Brandenberg is its highest peak at 355.4 metres, closely followed by the Klausberg at 354.7 metres. Its southern and south-western part runs seamlessly into the Belgian State Forest, and its western part, in the region of Vaalserberg hills, into the Dutch State Forest. The ridge runs from west to east, forming a watershed, the streams rising south of this line flow mostly into the Göhl and then the Meuse. Those that rise to the north eventually all flow into the Wurm. The Aachen streams of the municipal forest, especially the Wurm, but also the Pau, Johannisbach, Beverbach and Kannegießerbach, were of great importance to Aachen's textile industry.

With the takeover of Burtschied's municipal forest in 1897, Aachen acquired the forest cemetery (Waldfriedhof) with its Bismarck Tower, and with the addition of Forst's woodlands in 1906, it gained the Lintert cemetery and, in 1980, the private forest of the Schönforst Estate which had been bought in the 1860s from Baron Carl von Nellessen.

In 1925 the city finally acquired the Von Halfern Park from Landrat Carl von Halfern, which merges into the northern edge of the municipal forest. In addition, in the 20th century, two housing estates belonging to the city of Aachen were built within the forest; a small one in the area of Pommerotter Weg and another, the quarter of Preuswald, along the southern part of Lütticher Straße. The Aachen Forest is dominated by a telecommunications tower owned by Deutsche Telekom, built in 1984 and which is called the Mulleklenkes in the Aachen dialect.

== Wartime history and coffee smuggling ==
In the forest can be found remnants of the high voltage fence, which was built at the beginning of the First World War, as a means of preventing Belgians from escaping military service by fleeing to the Netherlands. It was powered by the Aachen side, and ran from Vaals, along the German-Dutch border up to the Vierländereck, and from there to the mouth of the Schelde. Several civilians and soldiers were killed in this section. Twenty years after the First World War, the Aachen Forest was included in the framework of the Aachen-Saar program for the construction of the Westwall. There is evidence of the remaining sections of the cusp line in Kopfchen, as well remnants of World War Two bunkers at Gut Entenpfuhl and Nellessenpark.

From 1945 to 1953 the forest was part of the Aachener Kaffeefront, when the high price of coffee encouraged smuggling between Germany, Belgium, and the Netherlands. Fern lined smuggler paths can still be seen and hint at the risks that smugglers took. In total, more than 50 people, including customs officers and smugglers, died in these actions in the Aachen Forest, and more than 60 were seriously injured.
