= Dautzenberg =

Dautzenberg is a surname.

- Johan Michiel Dautzenberg (1808–1869), a Belgian writer
- Philippe Dautzenberg (1849–1935), a Belgian malacologist
- Jens Dautzenberg (born 1974), a German sprinter
- Bertrand Dautzenberg, a French pulmonologist
- Leo Dautzenberg (1950-), a German politician
- Gerold Dautzenberg (1939-), an Austrian politician
- Dirk Dautzenberg (1921–2009), a German actor
- Jakob Dautzenberg (1897–1979), a German politician
- Rolf Dautzenberg (1945–2005), a German harness racer
- Gerhard Dautzenberg (1934-), a German theologian
- Anton Dautzenberg (1967-), a Dutch writer
- Peter Josef Franz Dautzenberg (1769–1828), a German librarian, journalist and politician
