= Wildbach (Wurm) =

River in Germany

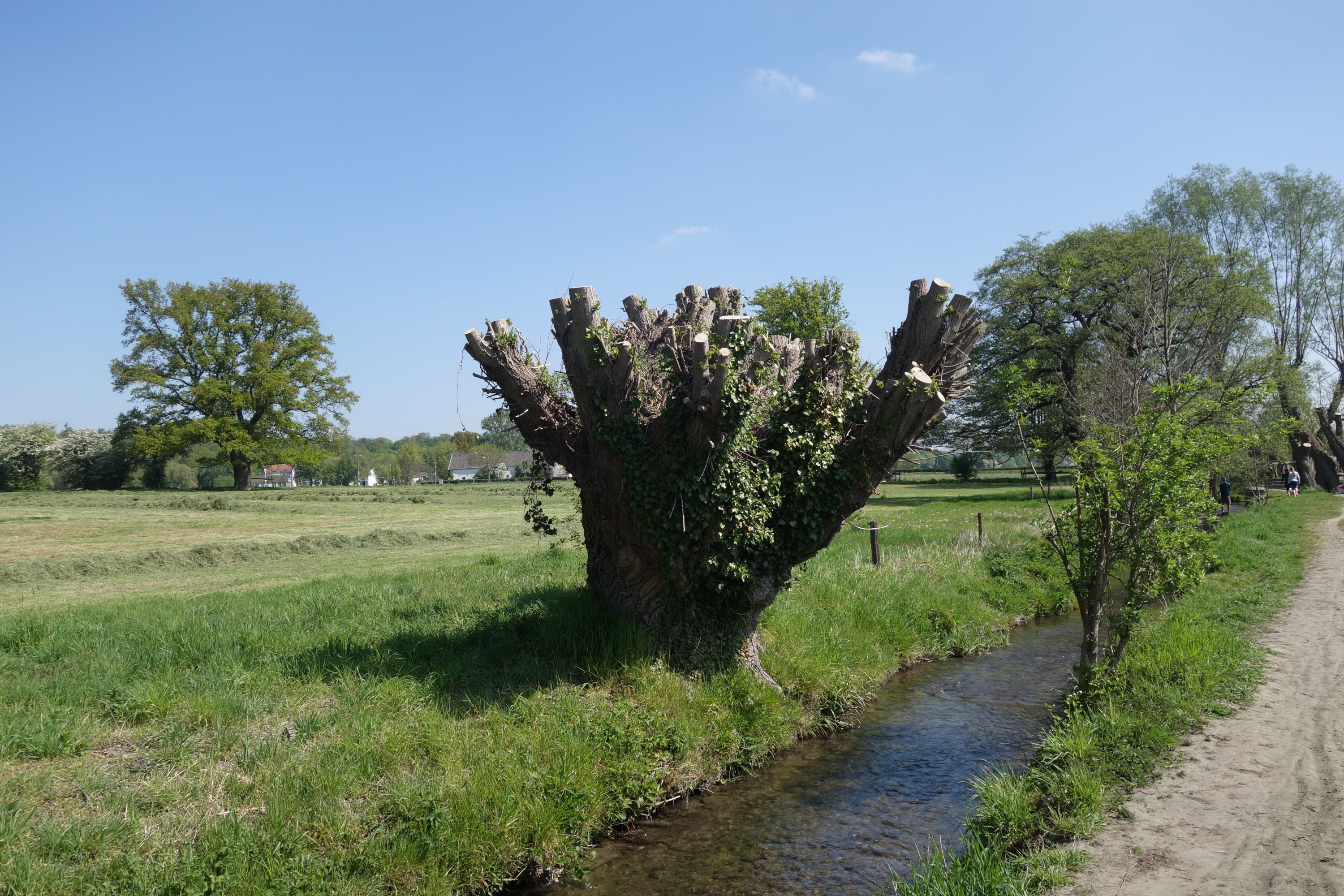

Location
- Country: Germany
- State: North Rhine-Westphalia

Physical characteristics
- Mouth
  - location: Wurm
  - coordinates: 50.8060°N 6.1015°E

Basin features
- Progression: Wurm→ Rur→ Meuse→ North Sea

Wildbach (German pronunciation: [ˈvɪltˌbax]) is a small river of North Rhine-Westphalia, Germany. It is 5.3 km (3.3 mi) long and is a left tributary of the Wurm, which it joins north of Aachen.

== See also ==
- List of rivers of North Rhine-Westphalia
