= Beverbach =

Beverbach may refer to:

- Beverbach (Weser), a river of Lower Saxony, Germany, tributary of the Weser
- Beverbach (Wurm), a river of North Rhine-Westphalia, Germany, tributary of the Wurm
