= Johannisbach =

Johannisbach may refer to:

- Johannisbach (Aachen), a river of North Rhine-Westphalia, Germany
- Johannisbach, name of the upper part of the Westfälische Aa, a river of North Rhine-Westphalia, Germany
