= Pau (Aachen) =

River in Aachen, Germany

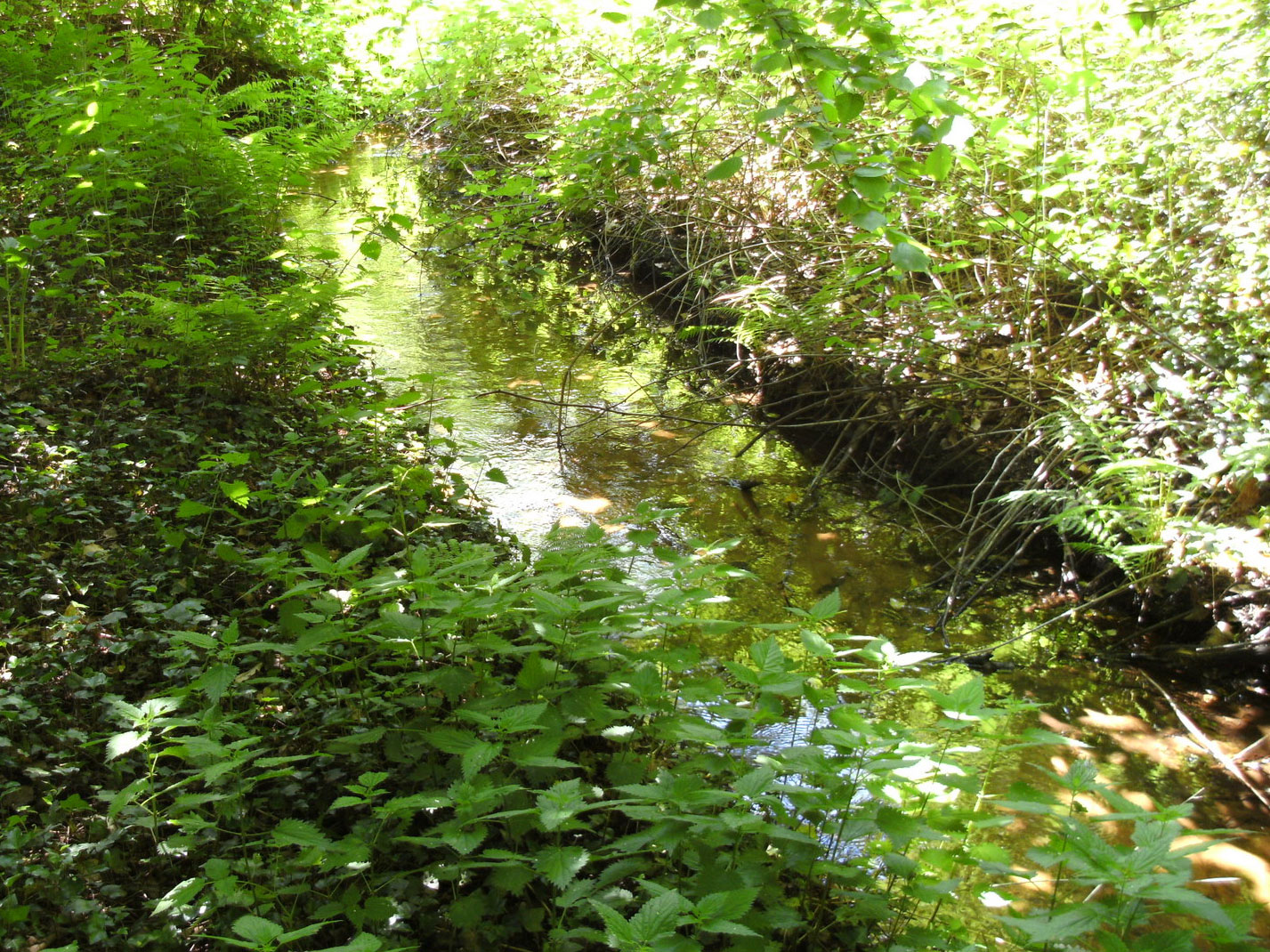

Location
- Country: Germany
- State: North Rhine-Westphalia

Physical characteristics
- Mouth
  - location: Wurm
  - coordinates: 50.7771°N 6.0982°E

Basin features
- Progression: Wurm→ Rur→ Meuse→ North Sea

Pau (also: Paubach) is a small river of Aachen, North Rhine-Westphalia, Germany. It is 4.1 km long and flows into the Wurm as a left tributary.

== History ==
The Johannisbach is one of the three historic streams of the medieval city of Aachen. The Johannisbach was used for the disposal of wastewater, while the Pau was diverted to serve as the source of fresh water. The Paunell was what remained in the former course of the diverted Pau.

== See also ==
- List of rivers of North Rhine-Westphalia
