= Verlautenheide =

- Part of Aachen
- Interactive map of Verlautenheide
- Location within Germany Location within North Rhine-Westphalia
- Coordinates: 50°47′47″N 6°9′20″E
- Country: Germany
- State: North Rhine-Westphalia
- District: Haaren
- City: Aachen

Area
  - Total: 8.80 km^{2} (3.40 sq mi)
- Elevation: 214 m (702 ft)

Population
  - Total: 3,500
  - Density: 400/km^{2} (1,000/sq mi)
- Time zone: UTC+01:00 (CET)
  - Summer (DST): UTC+02:00 (CEST)
- Postal codes: 52080
- Dialling codes: 02405

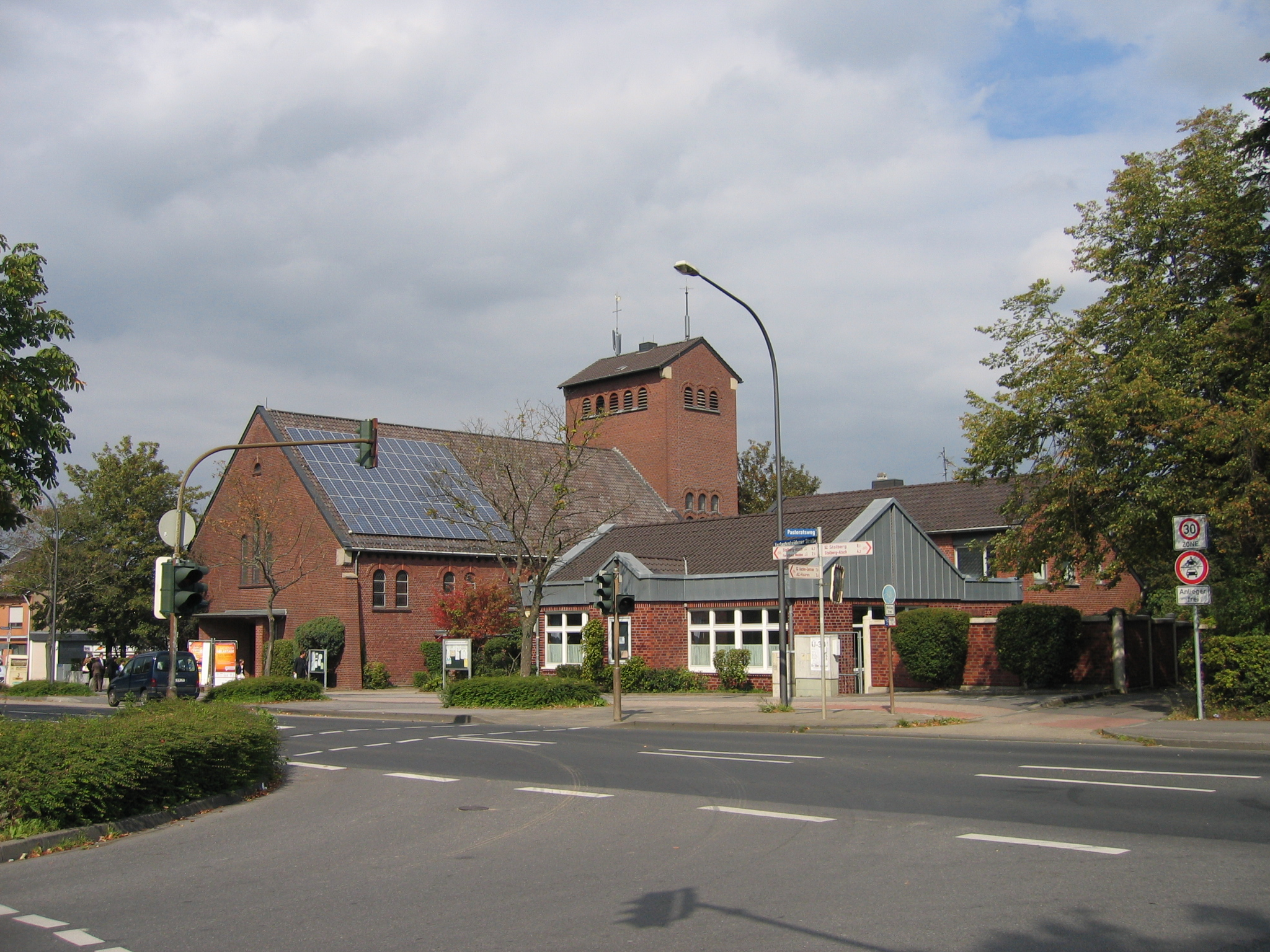
Center of Verlautenheide, with church

Verlautenheide is a rural section of northeast Aachen, with a population of around 3500. The community lies within the administrative district of Haaren. Its highest point is the Haarberg (around 240 m).

The east end of the town is known as Quinx.

== History ==
The village of Verlautenheide initially developed around the estate Heiderhof and was originally known as "Die Heyd". Much later, it became a Linear settlement (known in German as a Straßendorf). Verlautenheide was first mentioned (as Heide boven Haren) in 1445, in a lease and interest register for the Imperial Kornelimünster Abbey. The Kahlgracht Mill (Kahlgrachtmühle), which was built in the area of Verlautenheide in the 15th century, is an important testament to the town's existence then.

Together with Haaren, Verlautenheide belonged to Aachen until the end of the 19th century. At the time, Verlautenheide was also the location of one of the eight watchtowers surrounding and protecting Aachen, which is noted in the street name Türmchenweg (little tower way), which runs down the center of town. After France occupied Haaren and Verlautenheide in 1792 and 1794, administration of the town was maintained in Haaren under the French Mairie system, with the town formally becoming part of France as a result of the Treaty of Lunéville in 1801, before finally switching to the Kingdom of Prussia following the Treaty of Paris in 1814.

The area was intensely fought over in October 1944, and in Verlautenheide, US troops completed their surrounding of Aachen.

In the early 1960s, the first Aachen motorway "Wuerselen / Verlautenheide" (now Federal Highway 544) was built in Verlautenheide; around 1963, the motorway intersection with Aachen was completed.

Until the end of 1971, the community of Haaren/Verlautenheide was self-administered, but with the restructuring of Aachen's surrounding communities, the towns were incorporated into Aachen itself.

== Notable persons ==
Father Hugo Nießen worked in Verlautenheide in 1976. In October 1976 he became provost for the Protestant parish of St. Georg in the city of Wassenberg.

== Societies ==
There is the sports club SV Eintracht 1912 Verlautenheide, which plays on astroturf, the Carnival Society Bröselspetze 1950 (die Karnevalsgesellschaft Bröselspetze e. V. 1950), as well as the St Georg Girl Scouts Troop of Verlautenheide (Verlautenheide der Pfadfinderinnenschaft St. Georg), which has operated since 1980.
