= Beverbach (Wurm) =

River in Germany

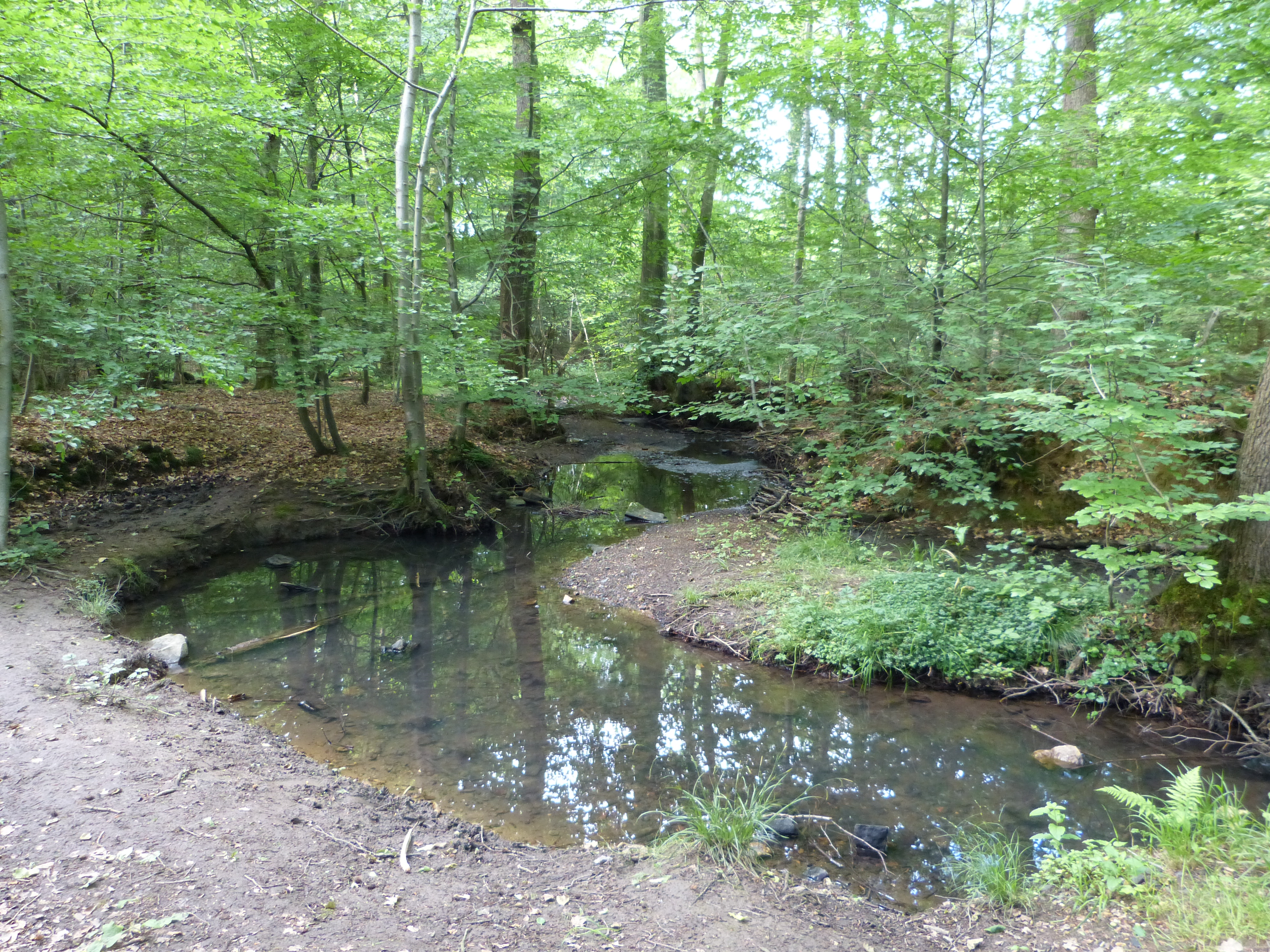

Location
- Country: Germany
- State: North Rhine-Westphalia

Physical characteristics
- Source
  - location: South of Aachen
  - coordinates: 50.7266°N 6.1082°E
- Mouth
  - location: In Aachen into the Wurm
  - coordinates: 50.7714°N 6.1003°E

Basin features
- Progression: Wurm→ Rur→ Meuse→ North Sea

Beverbach is a river of North Rhine-Westphalia, Germany.

The Beverbach springs south of Aachen. It is a right tributary of the Wurm in Aachen.

== See also ==
- List of rivers of North Rhine-Westphalia
