= Jakob Dautzenberg =

German politician

Jakob Dautzenberg (born 2 February 1897, in Würselen (today part of the district of Aachen); died 20 August 1979 in Aachen) was a German politician, member of the Communist Party of Germany, and resistance fighter against the Nazis. He was a member of the German Parliament during the Weimar Republic.

== Life ==
Dautzenberg, the son of foremen, was a trained foundryman. In 1912 he became a union member, and in 1922 he joined the Communist Party of Germany (KPD). He was a community representative for Haaren in the region of Aachen and, from 1925, in the district assembly of Aachen. In 1928, he became the full-time KPD Secretary in Aachen (until 1932). From 1928 until 1930 he was a member of the German Parliament Reichstag (Weimar Republic) for the Communist Party, representing the election region of Cologne-Aachen. He stayed Communist Party Secretary of Aachen until 1932, and was subsequently party secretary in Cologne.

After the Machtergreifung, or “seizure of power”, by the Nazis in 1933, he became unemployed. In 1933 and 1934 he was in pre-trial detention, after which he again worked as a foundryman. Dautzenberg put together a resistance group in Aachen and Eschweiler, which was broken up by the Gestapo in August 1944. Dautzenberg was arrested together with 200 other anti-fascists. In the Neuengamme concentration camp, he was subject to medical experimentation that involved exposure to deadly pathogens. Seriously ill, he was taken to the Bergen-Belsen concentration camp, where he was liberated in April 1945. When he returned to Haaren, his face and body were disfigured by fungal growths.

Running as a member of the Communist Party, he was again elected in 1946 to the regional assembly surrounding Aachen. Until the Communist Party was banned in 1956, he worked as district party manager for the Ruhr region, an urban, industrial area in central North Rhine-Westphalia. Afterwards, he retired to Haaren. In 1967, public prosecutors accused him of still working for the outlawed Communist Party, but the courts acquitted him.

In 1968, he joined the new German Communist Party.
