= Haaren (Aachen) =

- Borough of Aachen
- Interactive map of Haaren
- Location within Germany Location within North Rhine-Westphalia
- Coordinates: 50°47′44″N 6°7′37″E
- Country: Germany
- State: North Rhine-Westphalia
- District: Urban district
- City: Aachen

Area
  - Total: 8.80 km^{2} (3.40 sq mi)
- Elevation: 146 m (479 ft)

Population (2020-12-31)
  - Total: 12,482
  - Density: 1,420/km^{2} (3,670/sq mi)
- Time zone: UTC+01:00 (CET)
  - Summer (DST): UTC+02:00 (CEST)

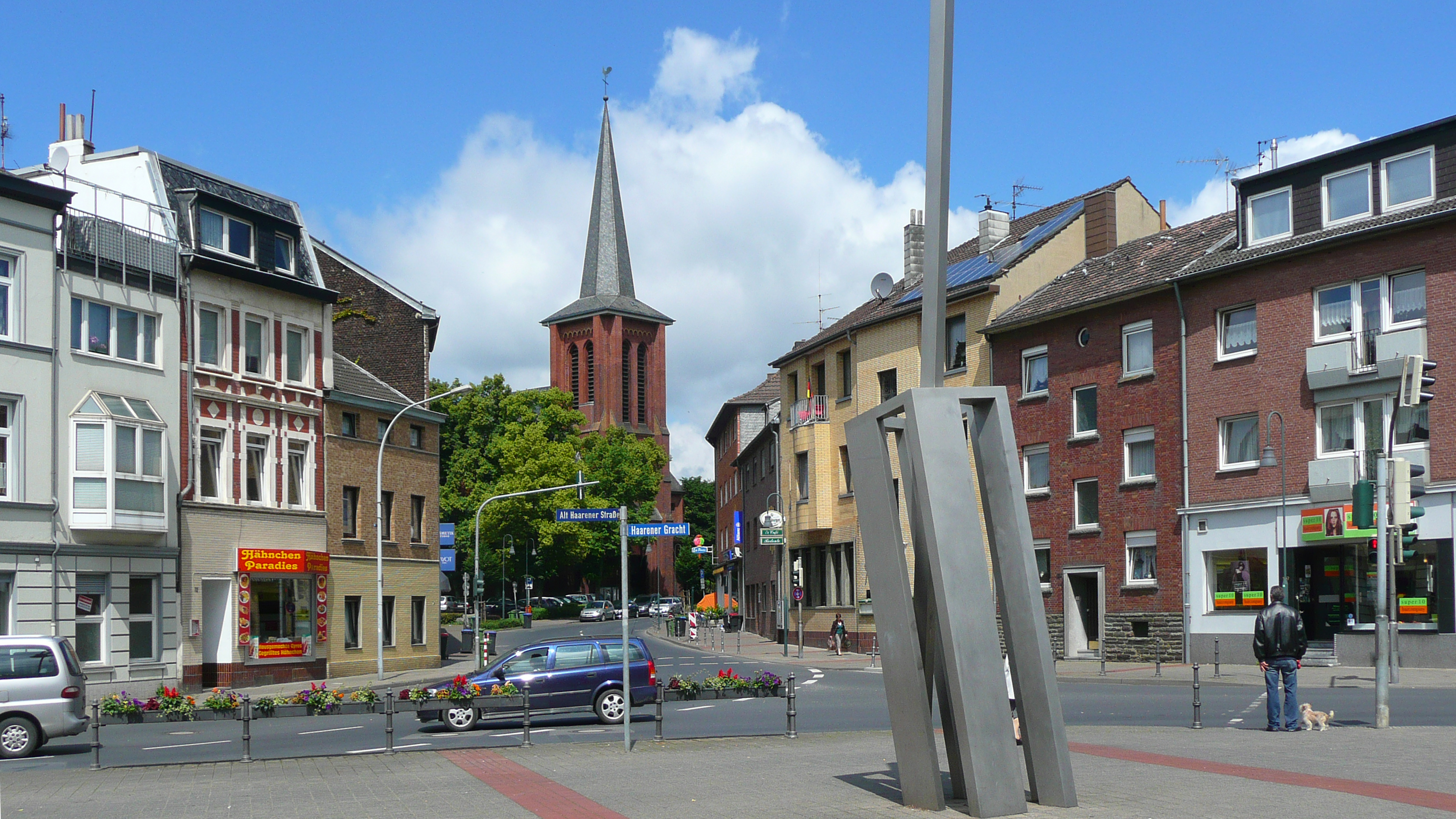
Center of Haaren, showing St. Germanus Church and sculpture by Joachim Bandau

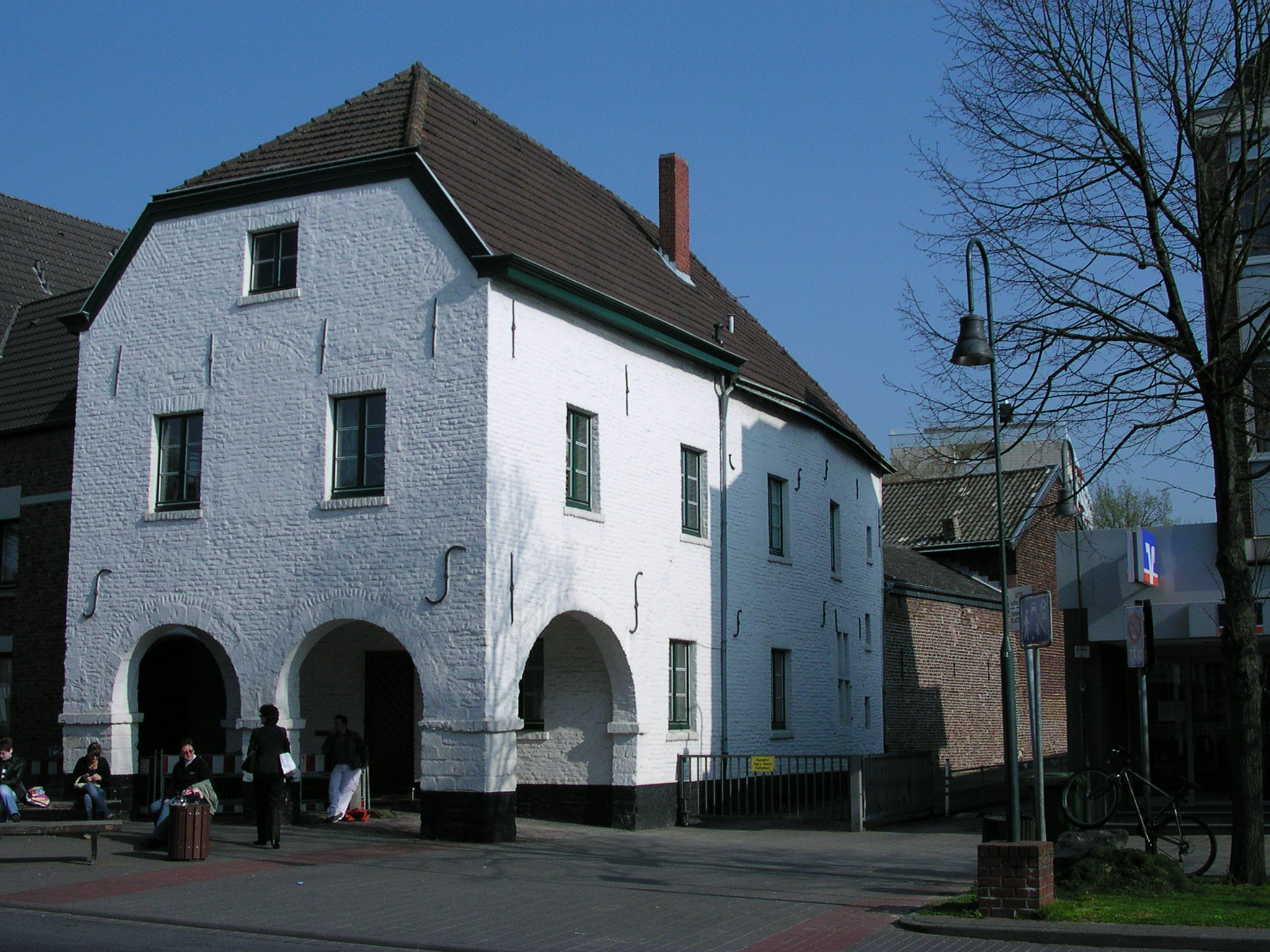
Old Tithing Hall

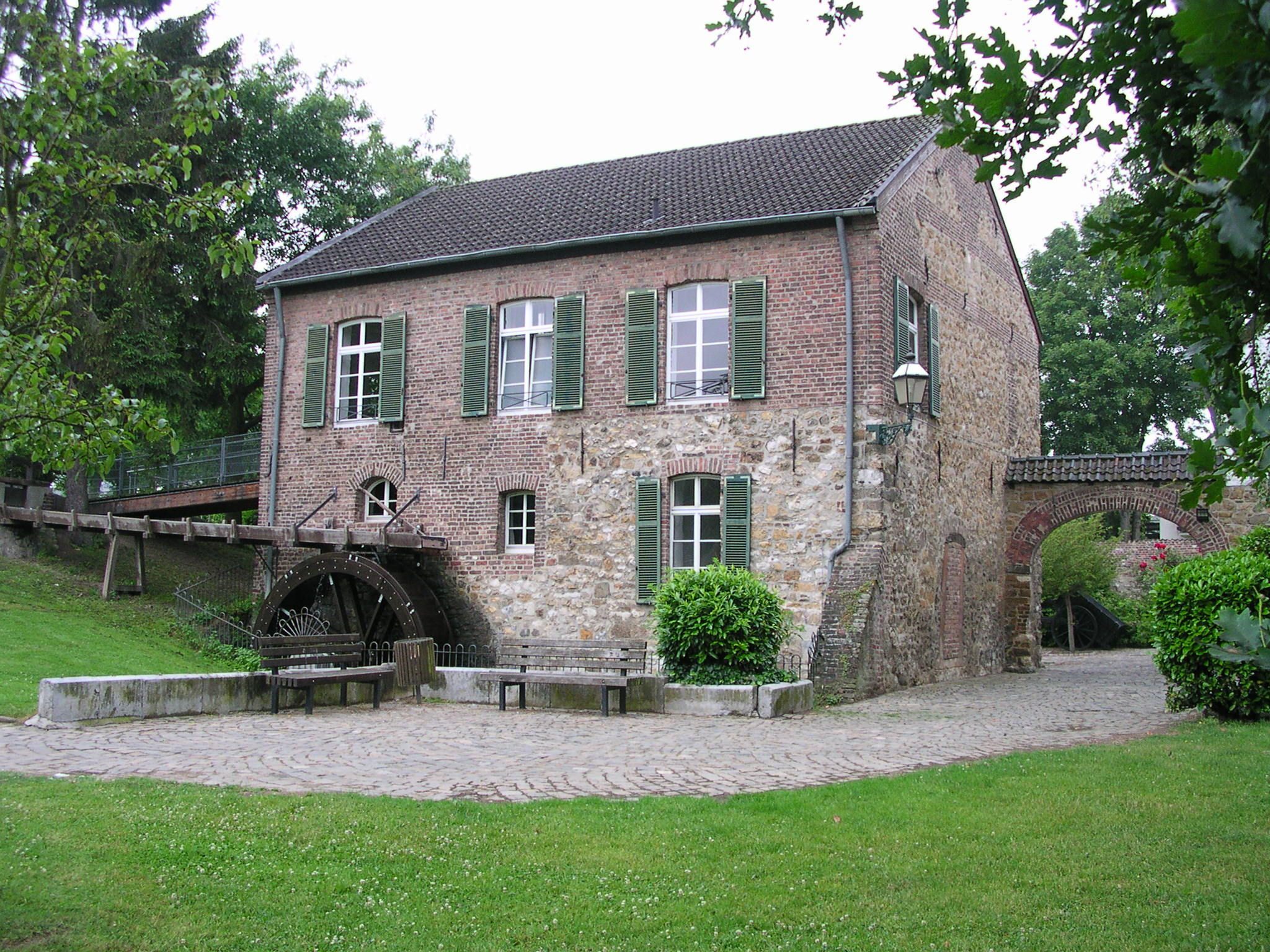
Welsh Mill

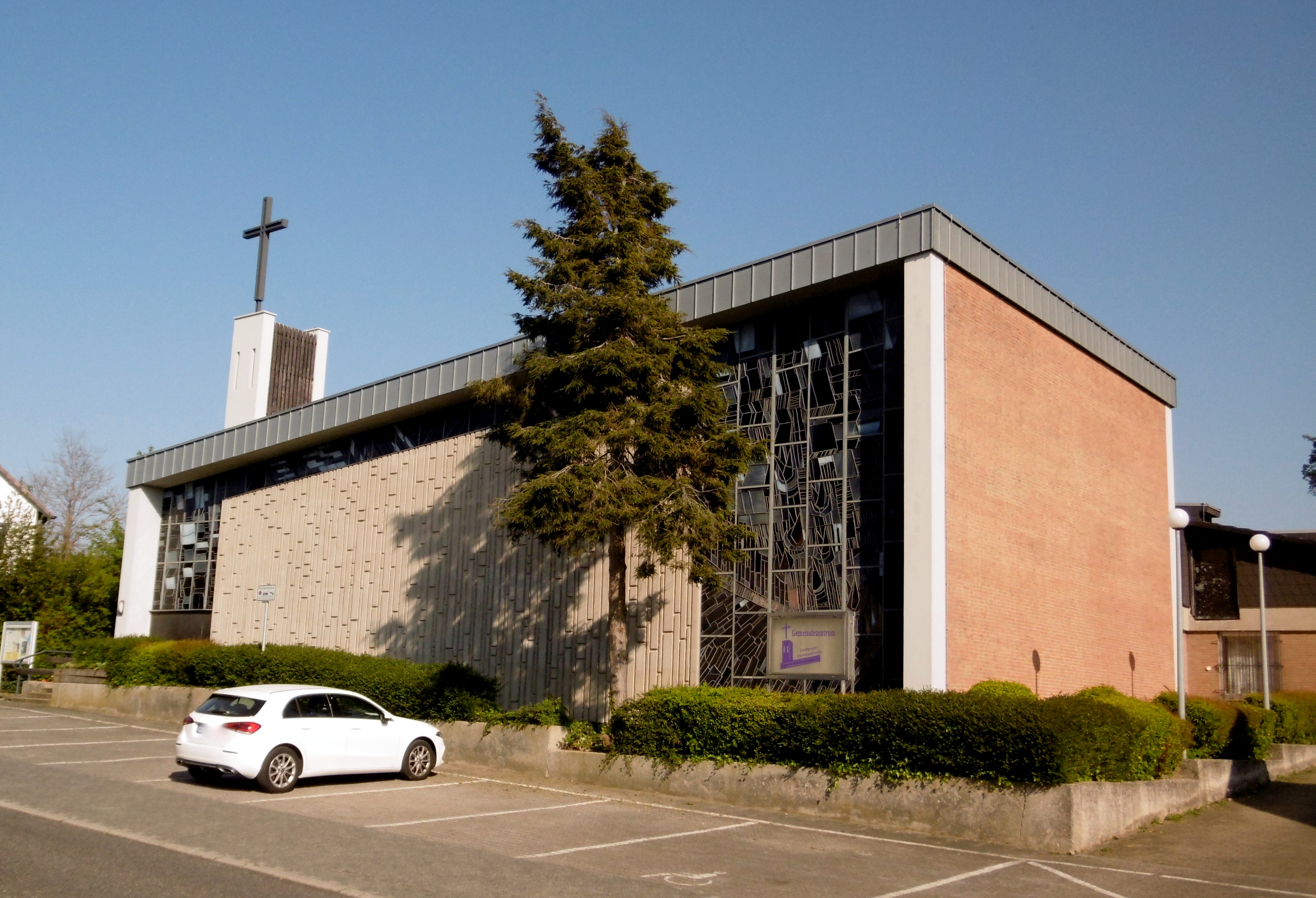
Christ Church (Protestant)

The formerly independent municipality of Haaren (German pronunciation: [ˈhaːʁən]) lies four kilometers north of Aachen, into which it was incorporated in 1972.

Haaren lies at the fork of the Wurm, itself a tributary of the Rur, and a smaller stream that shares its name with the community. Two kilometers farther east lies the predominantly rural Verlautenheide community.

As of 31 December 2020, the community has 12,482 inhabitants spread over 880 hectares.

== History ==
During the Carolingian dynasty, the region now occupied by Haaren belonged to the Aachen Royal Court. Used as royal hunting grounds, it likely belonged to the Würselen royal estate of Wormsalt. The first written mention to Haaren occurs in 1152, in the medieval Annales Rodenses, which were written at the Rolduc Abbey. Until the 18th century, Haaren belonged (together with Verlautenheide and Würselen) a district of the Free Imperial City of Aachen. The area was occupied by the French in 1792, and again in 1794. Haaren and Verlautenheide were administered independently under the French Mairie system and, beginning in 1801, belonged officially to France after the Treaty of Lunéville. After the Treaty of Paris in 1814, the community became part of Prussia.

In the 1920s, Haaren was mainly a working-class suburb for factories on Jülicher Straße (Jülich Street) in northeast Aachen. At that time, Haaren was a stronghold of the Communist Party of Germany.

In October 1944, Haaren was occupied by American troops and came under American first, and then British, administration. After the war, Haaren/Verlautenheide became an independently administered community within the region of Aachen. Following the restructuring of the towns and districts around Aachen, Haaren was incorporated into the city of Aachen, beginning 1 January 1972.

== Buildings ==
There are several buildings of note in Haaren, such as the medieval Tithing Hall (Zehnthof), where farmers would submit goods that they were legally obligated to tithe. Additionally, the Catholic Church of St Germanus is a neo-gothic structure that was erected in 1890-92, heavily damaged in 1944, and rebuilt in 1948.

Gut Überhaaren is the oldest estate in Haaren, and lies on Auf der Hüls Street, formerly South Street (Südstraße). The keystone above the main entrance bears the inscription “1692”, but the estate was listed in the directory of the city of Aachen as early as the 13th century.

The Welsh Mill (Welsche Mühle) is the only water mill in Aachen whose mill wheel is still in operation.

== Notable persons ==
- Viktor Brack (1904–1948), SS-Oberführer (senior colonel) and defendant in the Doctors' Trial, a subset of the Nuremberg Trials, executed for war crimes
- Jakob Dautzenberg (1897–1979), Communist and WWII resistance fighter
- Carlo Graaff (1914–1975), FDP Politician (FDP), member of parliament, and Minister of Economy of Lower Saxony
- Josephine Koch (1815–1899), Catholic nun, founder of the Franciscan Women of the Holy Family (Franziskanerinnen von der Heiligen Familie), born in Haaren

== Schools ==
Haaren has altogether four schools: the Gemeinschaftsgrundschule Am Haarbach (an elementary school), the Lindenschule (a special education school with an emphasis on language), as well as the vocational schools Mies-van-der-Rohe-Schule and the Berufskolleg für Gestaltung und Technik.

== Sports ==
In Haaren, there is the DJK FV Haaren 1912 sports club. The group offers competitive sports such as Association football, Tennis and Hapkido, a Korean martial art. Additionally, they offer recreational sports and activities, such as track and field, dance aerobics, and sports badges.

== Transport ==
Federal Highway 264 passes through Haaren on its way from Cologne to Liège. This road follows the same path as one that existed during the time of Ancient Rome. Public transport within Haaren is operated by ASEAG. In 2021 there are five bus stops: "Haaren Markt" being the central stop, operated by the lines 1, 7, 11, 21, 30, 31 and 41. Line 11 and 21 usually depart every 30 minutes, line 1, 31 and 41 every 60 minutes and line 7 and 30 only once a day. The other stops are "Denkmal" and "Haarberg" (Lines 11 and 21), "Tonbrennerstraße" (Lines 1, 7, 31 and 41) and "Bogenstraße" (Line 30 only - once a day) Also the Expressbus 220 to Jülich passes through the village center but doesn't stop there anywhere. Though Haaren lies directly at the railway track from Aachen North Station to Jülich, there has never been a railway station for passenger transport on this line until it was closed in 1981. Nowadays, this track is a bicycle path.
