= Johannisbach (Aachen) =

River in Germany

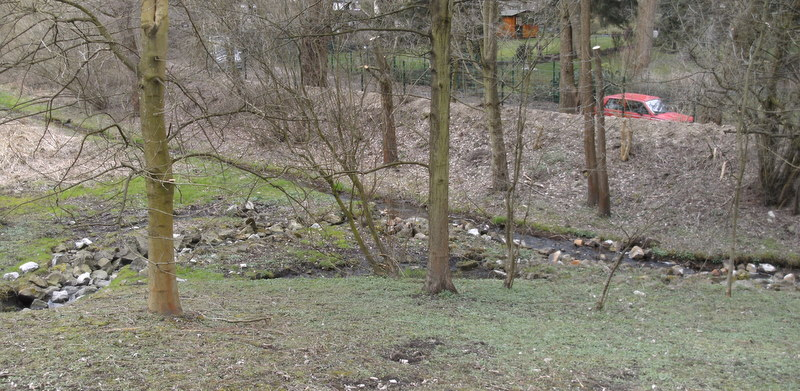

Location
- Country: Germany
- States: North Rhine-Westphalia

Physical characteristics
- Mouth
  - location: Pau
  - coordinates: 50.7760°N 6.0891°E

Basin features
- Progression: Pau→ Wurm→ Rur→ Meuse→ North Sea

Johannisbach is a stream in North Rhine-Westphalia, Germany. It flows through Aachen, merges with the Pau and the Paunell and then discharges into the river Wurm.

== History ==
The Johannisbach is one of the three historic streams of the medieval city of Aachen. The Johannisbach was used for the disposal of wastewater, while the Pau was diverted to serve as the source of fresh water. The Paunell was what remained in the former course of the diverted Pau.

== See also ==
- List of rivers of North Rhine-Westphalia
