= Wurm (Rur) =

River in Germany

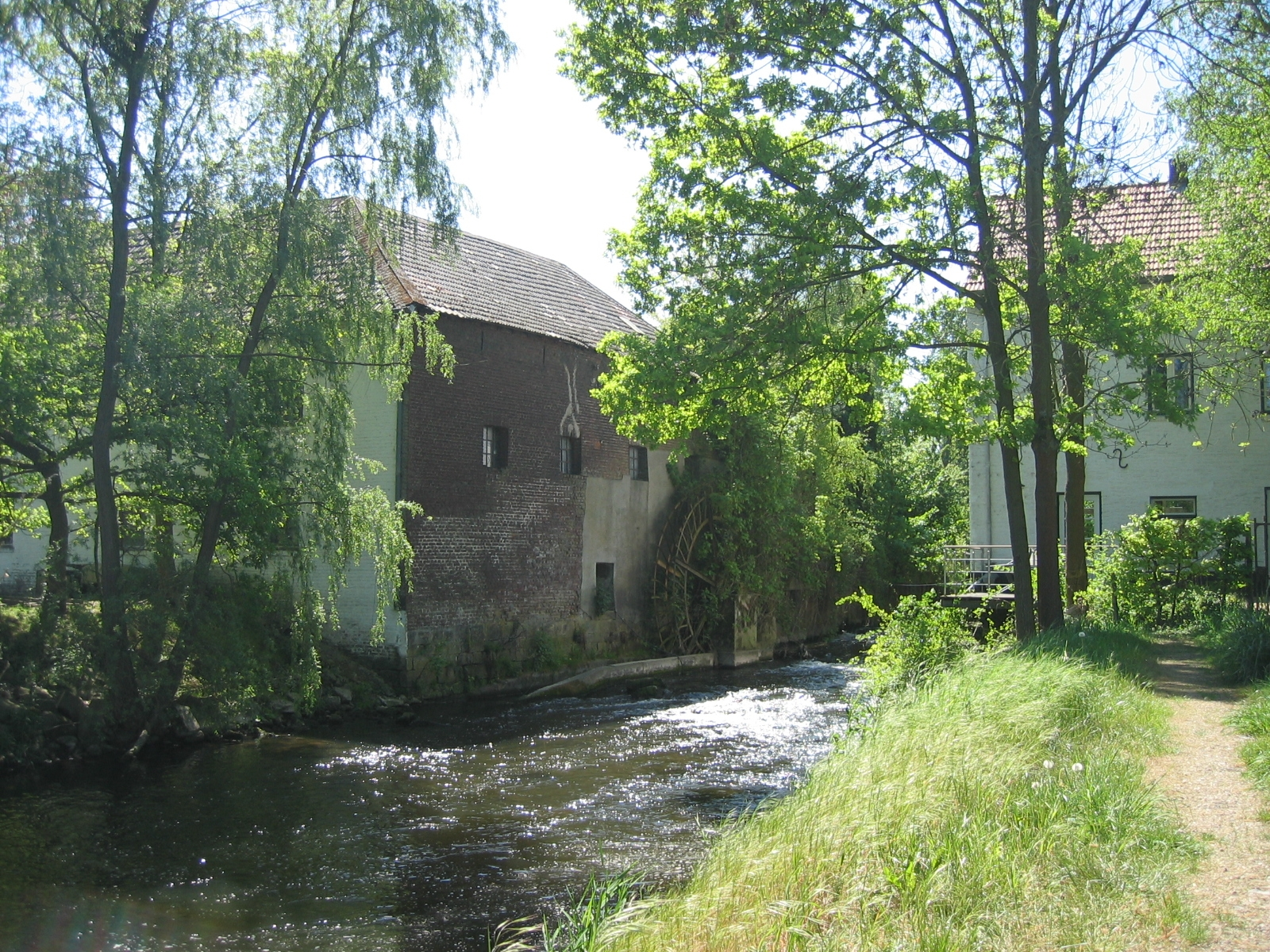
- Zwei Mühlen on the Wurm between Schloss Rimburg (D) and the village of Rimburg (NL)

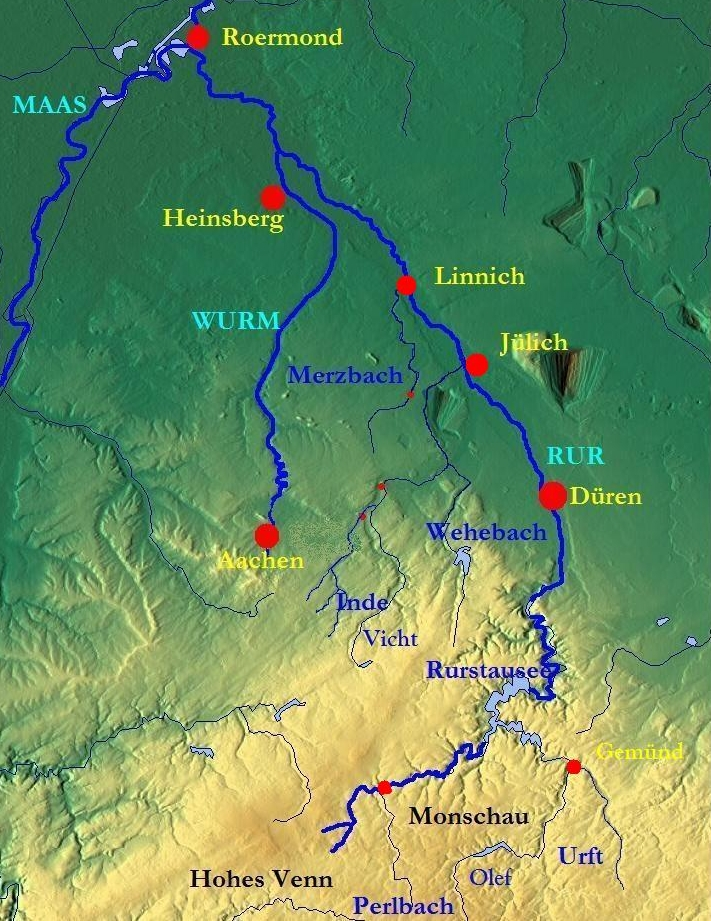
- Course of the Inde, Wurm and Rur

Location
- Country: Germany
- State: North Rhine-Westphalia
- Reference no.: DE: 2828

Physical characteristics
- Source
  - location: South of Aachen
  - coordinates: 50°44′15″N 6°05′16″E
  - elevation: 265 m above sea level (NN)
- Mouth
  - location: North of Heinsberg into the Rur
  - coordinates: 51°05′52″N 6°06′22″E
  - elevation: 32 m above sea level (NN)
- Length: 57.1 km (35.5 mi)
- Basin size: 355.518 km^{2} (137.266 sq mi)

Basin features
- Progression: Rur→ Meuse→ North Sea
- Landmarks: Cities: Aachen; Large towns: Geilenkirchen

The Wurm (German pronunciation: [vʊʁm]; Dutch: Worm [ˈʋɔr(ə)m]) is a river in the state of North Rhine-Westphalia in western Germany. It rises in the Eifel mountains and flows for 57 kilometres before discharging into the Rur.

== Geography ==
The Wurm is a left (western) tributary of the Rur (Dutch: Roer). The Rur is a tributary of the Meuse.

The sources of the Wurm are several brooks in the forests southwest of Aachen, which form the Wurm after the Diepenbenden reservoir. From there the Wurm nowadays flows through canals through the city of Aachen, until it resurfaces again at the Europaplatz in the east of Aachen. North of Aachen (between Kerkrade and Herzogenrath) the river forms the border with the Netherlands for approximately 10 km. It flows into the Rur near Heinsberg.

Other towns on the river Wurm are Würselen, Übach-Palenberg and Geilenkirchen.

The name Wurm is thought to originate from the German word warm (same meaning in English), as the source brooks were fed from the thermal springs in Aachen.

== Gallery ==
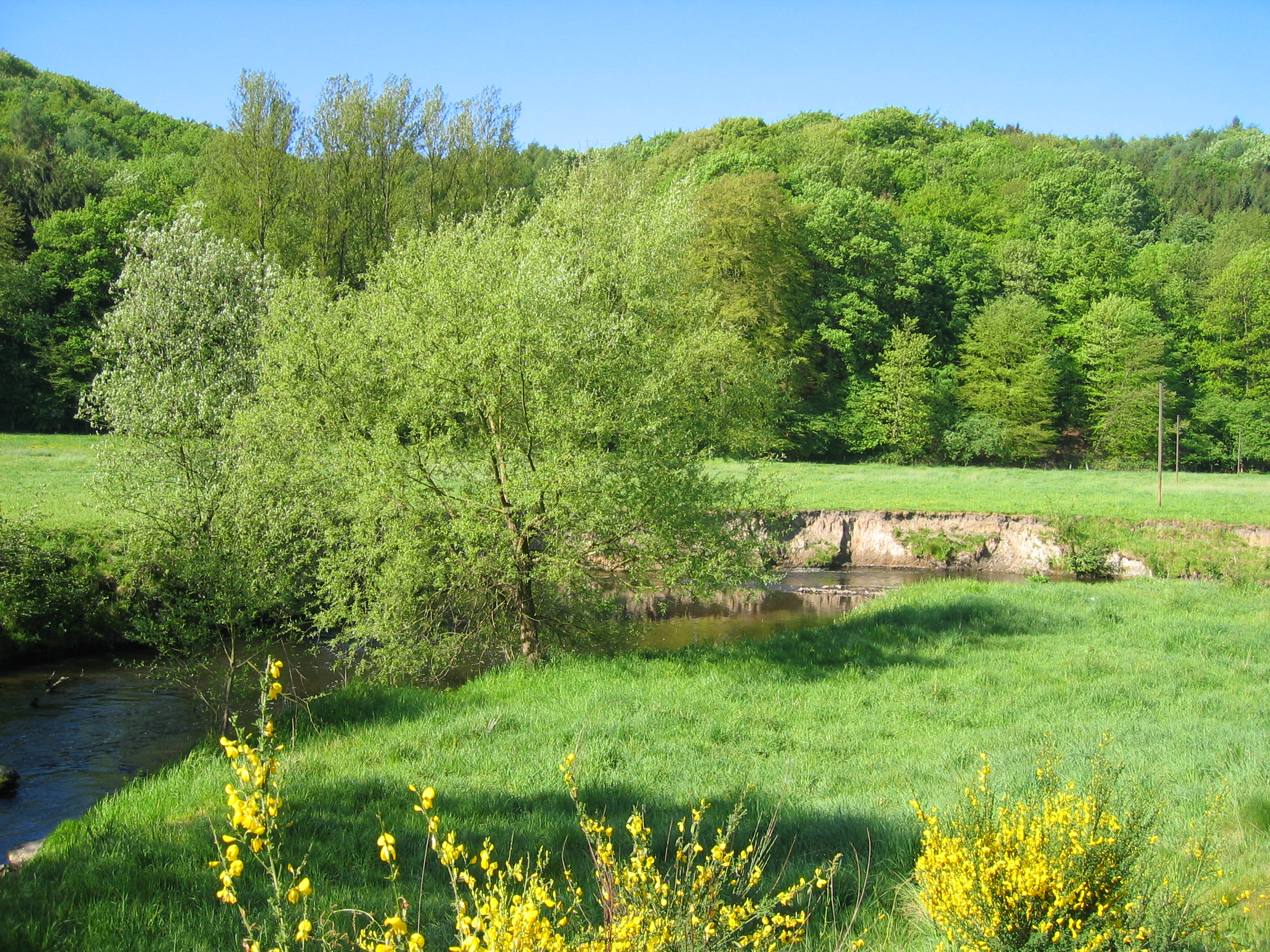
Meanders of the Wurm near Kohlscheid

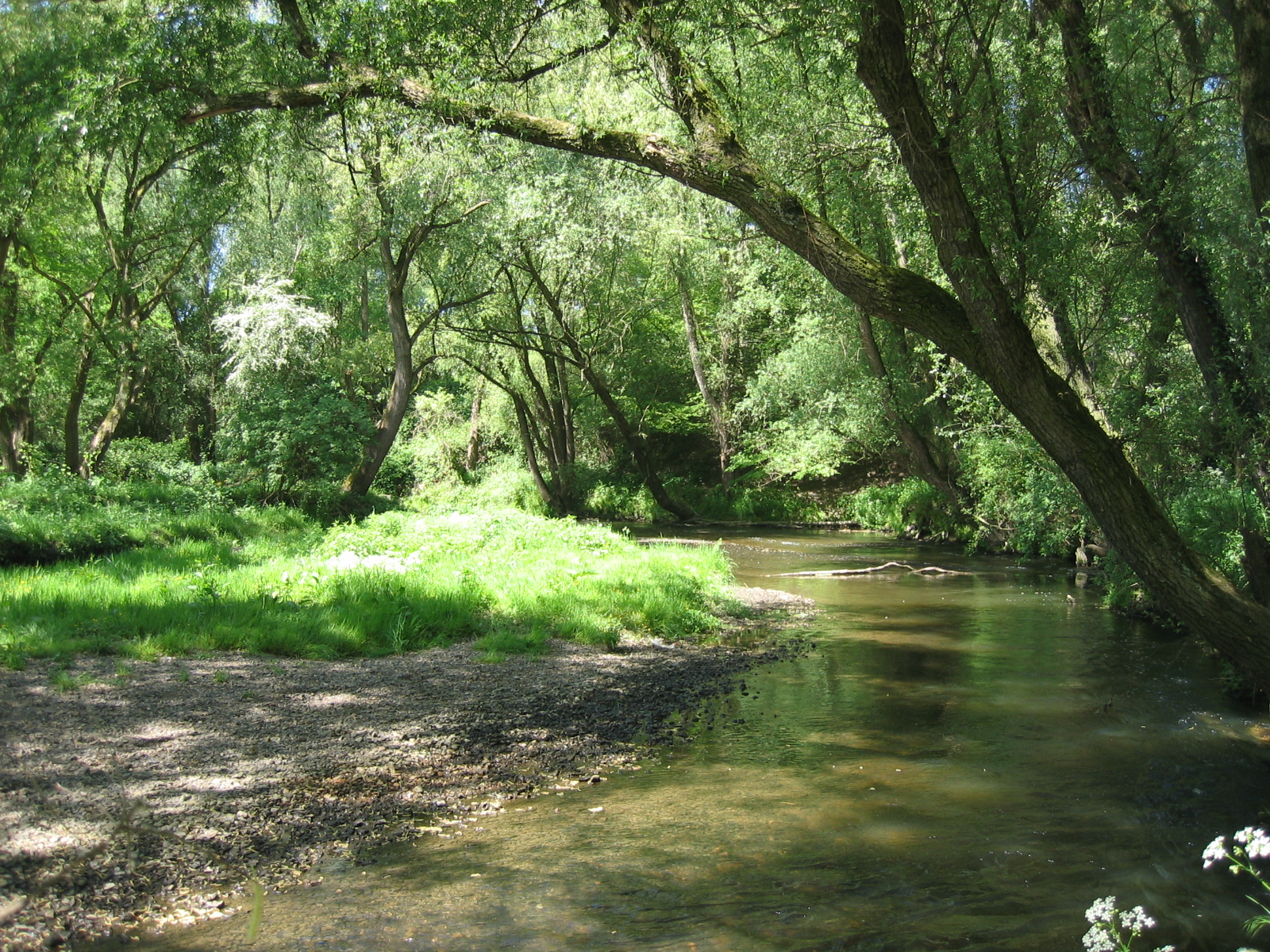
Wilderness

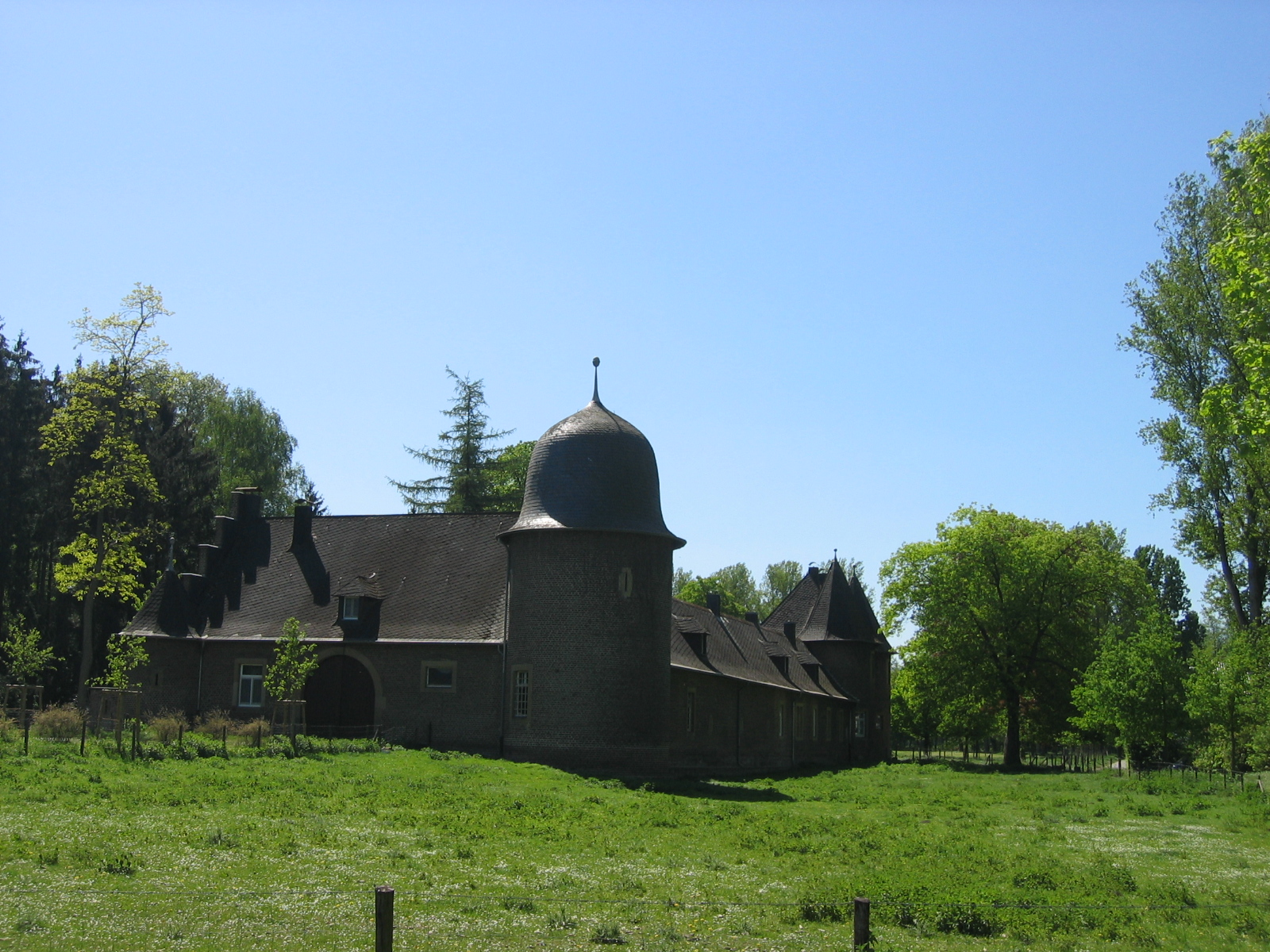
Rimburg Castle near Übach-Palenberg

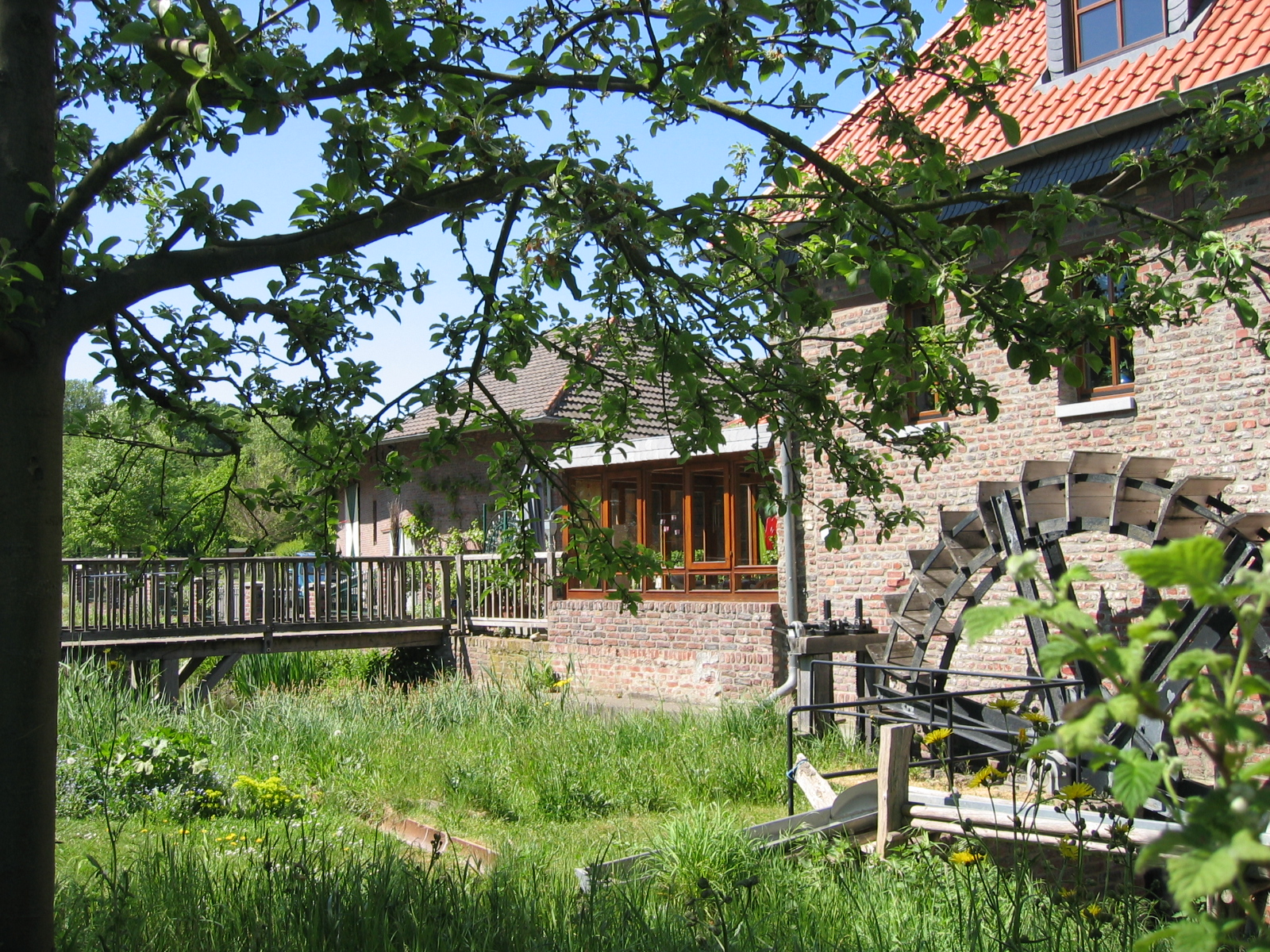
Watermill near Zweibrüggen

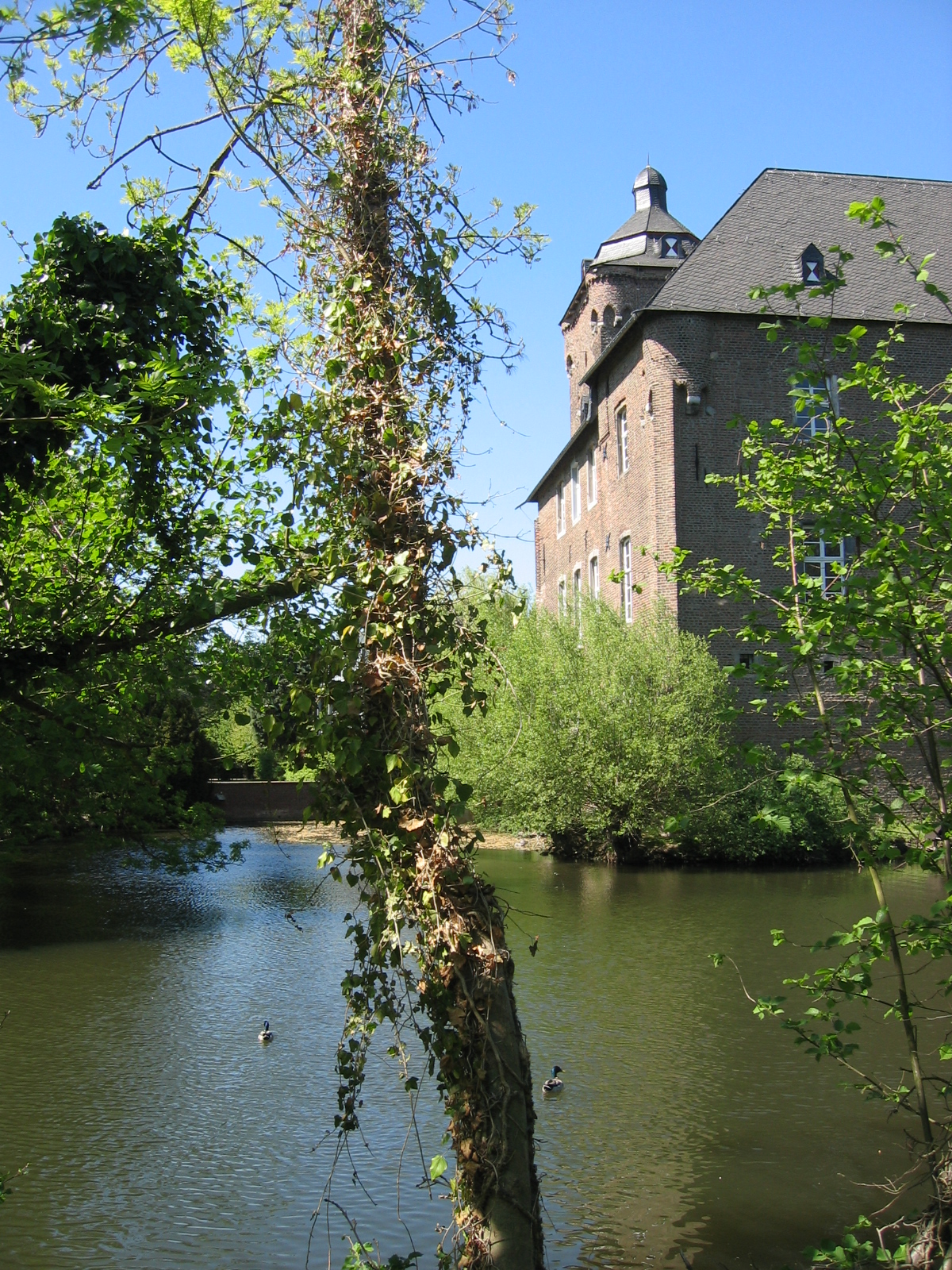
Castle Trips, Geilenkirchen

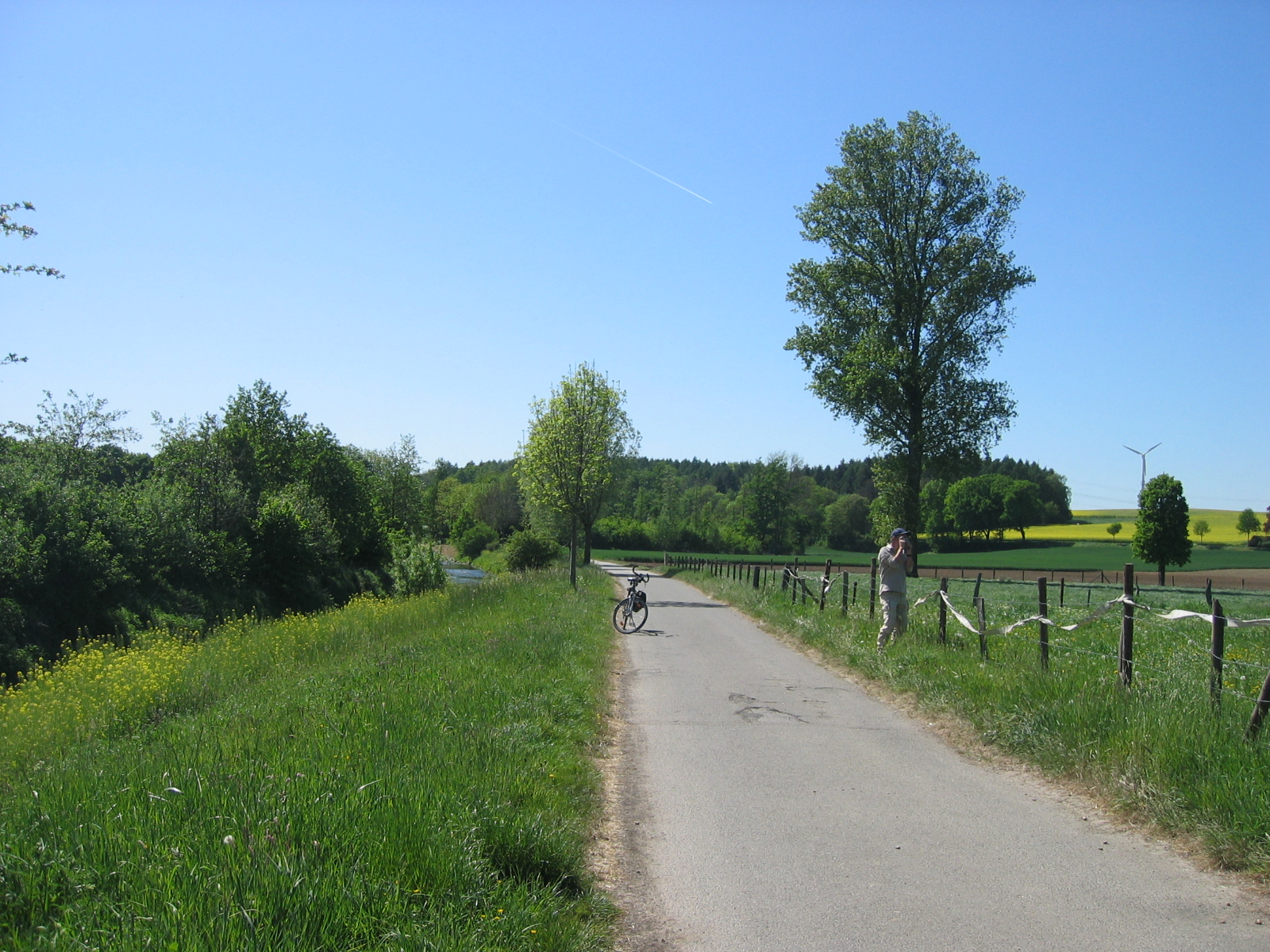
Wurm valley near Süggerath

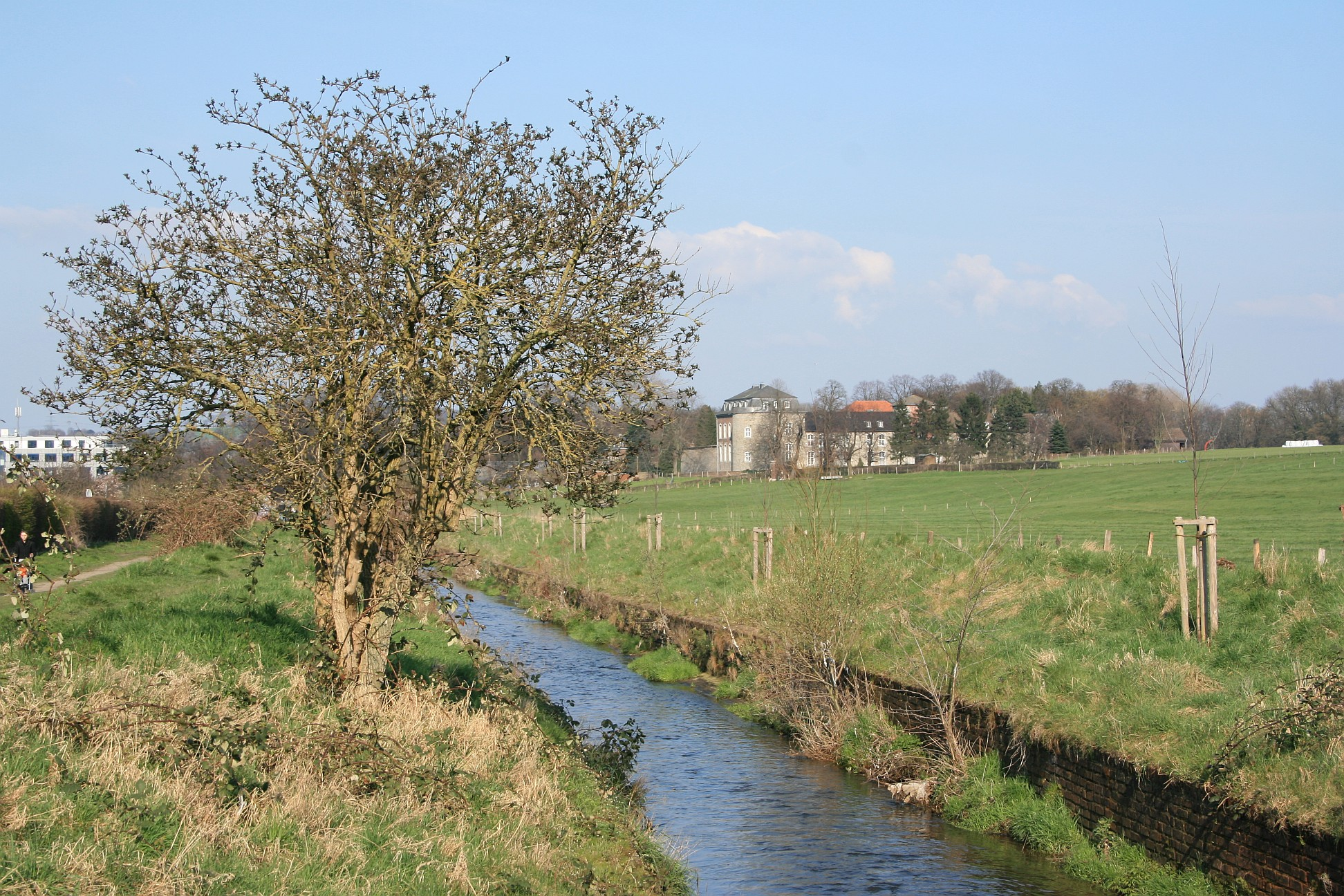
Wurm at Gut Kalkofen, Aachen

== See also ==
- Category:Rur basin
- List of rivers of North Rhine-Westphalia
