= Curley =

Curley is a surname, given name, nickname or stage name. It may refer to:

== Surname ==
- August Curley (born 1960), American football player
- Arthur Curley (1938–1998), American librarian
- Barney Curley (1939–2021), Irish racehorse trainer
- Bill Curley (born 1972), American basketball coach and player
- Billy Curley (born 1945), English former footballer
- Brian Curley (born 1959), American golf course architect
- Carlo Curley (1952–2012), American concert organist
- Cindy Curley (born 1963), American ice hockey coach, executive and player
- Craig Curley (born 1988), Native American distance runner
- Dan Curley (born 1979), American football player
- Daniel Curley (1918–1988), American novelist and short story writer
- Daniel Joseph Curley (1869–1932), American prelate
- Edward W. Curley (1873–1940), American politician
- Ian Curley (born 1972), British auto racing driver
- Jack Curley (born Jacques Armand Schuel, 1876 - 1937), American sports promoter
- James Curley (disambiguation)
  - James Curley (astronomer) (1796–1889), Irish-American astronomer
  - James Curley (Australian politician) (1846–1913), Australian politician
  - James Michael Curley (1874–1958), Governor and U.S. Representative from Massachusetts and mayor of Boston
- John Curley (professor) (born 1938), Journalism professor, newspaper editor and publisher
- John Curley (musician), (born 1965), American musician
- John P. Curley (1891–1973), American college athletics administrator
- Johnny Curley (1897–1982), English boxer
- Leo Curley (1915–1950), American politician (son of James Michael Curley)
- Maddy Curley (born 1981), American actress and former gymnast
- Marianne Curley (born 1959), Australian author
- Martha A.Q. Curley (born 1952), American nurse
- Matt Curley (born 1983) American ice hockey coach and player
- Michael Joseph Curley (1879–1947), Irish-born Catholic Archbishop of Baltimore and Washington
- Michael Curley (footballer) (1912–1973), English footballer
- Mick Curley, Gaelic football referee
- Pauline Curley (1903–2000), American vaudeville and silent film actress
- Pauline Curley (athlete), (born 1969), Irish marathon runner
- Patricia S. Curley (born 1946), American jurist
- Rob Curley (born 1971), American executive
- Robert M. Curley (1922–2001), American jurist and legislator
- Sean Curley (born 1995), American actor
- Simon Curley (1917–1989), Irish cricketer
- Timothy Curley (born 1954), athletic director
- Thomas Curley (disambiguation)
  - Thomas Curley (Wisconsin general) (1825–1904), Irish American Civil War general and politician
  - Thomas Curley (sound engineer) (born 1976), American production sound mixer
  - Tom Curley (born 1948), American journalist
  - Tom Curley (footballer), (born 1945), Scottish footballer
- Todd Curley (born 1973), Australian rules footballer
- Walter Curley (1922–2016), American Ambassador
- Doc Curley, nickname of Walter James Curley (1874–1920), American professional baseball player
- William Curley (born 1971), Scottish patissier and chocolatier

== First name, nickname or stage name ==
- Curley Andrews, nickname for William Andrews (fl. 1943 – 1944), American baseball player
- Curley Bridges (1934–2014), American singer, pianist and songwriter
- Curley Byrd, nickname of Harry Clifton Byrd (1889–1970), American sports coach and university administrator
- Curley Christian, nickname of Ethelbert Christian (likely 1882 – 1954), Black Canadian First World War veteran and activist
- Curley Culp (born 1963), American football player
- Curley Davis, nickname for Volney Davis (1902–1982), American bank robber
- Curley Headed Doctor (1828–1890), Native American spiritual leader
- Curley Fletcher, nickname of Carmen William Fletcher (1892–1954), American composer of cowboy songs and cowboy poetry
- Curley G, stage name of Xilinnayi Gao (born 1998), Chinese singer-songwriter
- Curley Hallman Hudson Hallman (born 1947), American football player and coach
- Curley "Boo" Johnson (born 1965), American basketball player
- John Curley Johnson (1935–2016), American Football League and National Football League punter
- Curley Jones, nickname of Ralph Jones (1880–1951), American football and basketball coach
- Curley Mitchell, nickname of French Mitchell, American fiddler
- Curley Money, nickname of Robert Earnest Money (1925–2003), American rockabilly musician
- Curley Moore, nickname of June Moore (1943–1985), American R&B singer
- Curley Russell, nickname of Dillon Russell (1917–1986), American jazz double-bassist
- Curley Walker, nickname of Cornelius Walker (4 February 1894 – 1973), British boxer
- Curley Weaver, also known as Slim Gordon (1906–1962), American blues musician
- Curley Williams, nickname of Dock Williams (1914–1970) was an American country and western musician and songwriter

== Middle name ==
- Wesley Curley Clark, fullname of W. C. Clark (born 1939), American blues musician
- Kay Curley Bennett (1922–1997) Navajo artist and writer

== Fictional characters ==
- "Curley", in the Bluey and Curley comic strip drawn by Alex Gurney
- Curley, in John Steinbeck's 1937 novel Of Mice and Men
- William "Curley" Benson, the lead character in two Our Gang spin-off films, Curley (1947) and Who Killed Doc Robbin (1948)

== See also ==
- Carley (name)
- Corley (surname)
- Culley (given name)
- Curlee (name)
- Curly, name list
- Curli, protein
- Curtley (given name)
- McCurley
