= Corley (surname) =

Corley is a surname and occasional given name. Notable people with the name include:

- Al Corley, American actor, singer and producer
- Annie Corley (born 1952), American actress
- Ariel Corley, known as DJ Holographic, American disc jockey and record producer
- Carl Corley, US born author and illustrator
- Catherine Corley, later Catherine Corley Anderson (1909–2001), American writer of children's books
- Carmen Corley, (born 2001), American tenniswoman
- Charlene Corley, American defense contractor
- Christopher A. Corley (born 1980), American politician
- DeMarcus Corley, boxer from Washington D.C.
- Donald Corley (1886–1955), American author of short stories, illustrator and architect
- Edwin Corley (1931–1981), American novelist
- Elizabeth Corley (born 1956), investment executive
- Eric Corley, prominent figure in the hacker community, often known as Emmanuel Goldstein
- Hal Corley, American television writer, playwright, and theatre director
- Harry Corley (1878–1936), Irish cricketer
- Ivana Corley, (born 1999), American tenniswoman
- Joe Corley, American karate and kickboxing competitor
- John Thomas Corley (1914–1977), U.S. Army general
- John D.W. Corley, U.S. Air Force general
- The Fantastic Johnny C, born Johnny Corley, American soul singer
- Ken Corley (1920–1984), American basketball player
- Manuel S. Corley (1823–1902), US House of Representatives member from South Carolina
- Quentin Durward Corley (1884–1980), Texas circuit judge
- Pat Corley (1930–2006), American actor
- Ray Corley (1928–2007), American basketball player
- Roy F. Corley (1874–1953), American politician
- W. Gene Corley (1935–2013), American structural engineer
- Catherine Corley Anderson, American writer of children's books
- Corley Ellis, American politician
- Denys Corley Smith (1922–1989), British author and journalist

== See also ==
- Curley
