= John F. R. Seitz =

United States Army general (1908–1978)

John Francis Regis Seitz
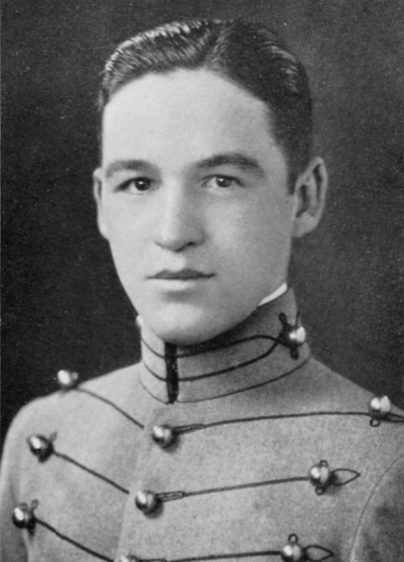
- As a West Point cadet
- Born: May 22, 1908; Wilmington, Delaware, United States
- Died: October 10, 1978 (aged 70); Washington, D.C., United States
- Burial place: Arlington National Cemetery, Virginia, United States
- Military career
- Allegiance: United States
- Branch: United States Army
- Service years: 1929–1966
- Rank: Major General
- Service number: 0-17734
- Unit: Infantry Branch
- Commands: 26th Infantry Regiment; 2nd Infantry Division
- Conflicts: World War II; Korean War
- Awards: Army Distinguished Service Medal (2); Legion of Merit; Silver Star (2); Bronze Star (3); Presidential Unit Citation; American Defense Service Medal; American Campaign Medal; European-African-Middle Eastern Campaign Medal; World War II Victory Medal; French Legion of Honour; Croix de guerre 1939–1945 (France); French Médaille militaire, Fourragère, cord device Order of Leopold (Belgium) officer Croix de guerre (Belgium) with palm Order of Abdon Calderón (Ecuador); Belgian Fourragère, 1940, cord device Army of Occupation of Germany Medal; Korean War Service Medal; National Defense Service Medal

Major General John Francis Regis "Jeff" Seitz (May 22, 1908 – October 10, 1978) was a career United States Army officer who, after serving in World War II and the Korean War, retired as Deputy Commander of the First United States Army in 1966. Seitz graduated from the United States Military Academy at West Point, New York, in 1929. He served in several assignments before commanding a battalion at Schofield Barracks at Oahu, Hawaii, on December 7, 1941, during the Japanese attack on Pearl Harbor. After the United States entered the Second World War, Seitz served in important staff positions from early 1942 to late 1943. He was highly decorated for his service as colonel commanding the 26th United States Infantry Regiment in combat in the European Theater of World War II for most of the remainder of the war, which was especially distinguished.

From November 26, 1943, to April 9, 1945, Seitz commanded the 26th Infantry Regiment (organized for the 1944–1945 campaign in France, Belgium and Germany as Regimental Combat Team 26 or Combat Team (CT) 26). CT 26 was a unit of the 1st Infantry Division (United States). Seitz commanded the combat team at Omaha Beach during the Normandy landings on D-Day, in the breakout from Normandy and at the approach to close the gap in the Falaise Pocket. The First United States Army, including Seitz's regimental combat team, hotly pursued the fleeing German Army divisions across France to the border of Germany by September 7, 1944. On October 11, 1944, after heavy fighting during the Battle of Aachen, Seitz led two of the three battalions of the regiment into heavily defended Aachen, Germany. They seized the first German city to fall to the Allies of World War II after 8 days of urban combat. In November 1944, Seitz led the regiment during the opening phase of the Battle of Hürtgen Forest. Starting only 10 days after the regiment was withdrawn from this bloody and costly battle, Seitz directed CT 26's heroic, successful stand at the Battle of Bütgenbach, an important part of the Battle of the Bulge that followed the Battle of Elsenborn Ridge. With many replacement soldiers due to losses in the Hürtgen Forest, and with skillful artillery support, Seitz and the outnumbered 26th Infantry Regiment team prevented the Nazi 12th SS Panzer Division Hitlerjugend, 3rd Parachute Division (Germany) and the 12th Volksgrenadier Division, which were supported by dozens of tanks, from breaking the Allied line at Bütgenbach.

After the Battle of the Bulge, Seitz led CT 26 during operations to clear remaining German forces from positions in Belgium. Then on February 1–3, 1945, he directed an attack on the Siegfried Line or Westwall German border defenses on the German-Belgium border. The 26th Infantry Regiment broke through the German defenses to capture Hollerath, (Hellenthal-Hollerath), Germany. CT 26 under Seitz's command pushed on to cross the Roer River on February 25, 1945, and the Neffel Creek and Erft River by March 4, 1945. On March 8, the 16th United States Infantry Regiment and 18th United States Infantry Regiment captured Bonn, Germany, while the 26th Infantry Regiment secured the flank. On March 15, CT 26 crossed the Rhine River at the Remagen bridgehead and on March 17 began an attack to the northeast. On March 25, the 3rd Battalion, 26th Infantry Regiment and the 18th Infantry Regiment captured Ukerath, Germany, which was used as a base for the 1st Infantry Division's participation in the encirclement of the Ruhr Pocket. (Note: More than 317,000 German soldiers surrendered to the 1st U.S. Army in the Falaise pocket in late March and early April 1945. Wheeler, 2007, pp. 379–80.) On April 9, 1945, Seitz was appointed to a brigadier general's position as assistant division commander of the 69th Infantry Division (United States). The 69th Infantry Division met the Soviet Union's 5th Guards Army at the Elbe River in Germany on April 25, 1945.

Due to the end of the war in Europe on May 8, 1945, the freeze of promotions, the subsequent reduction in the size of the U.S. Army and the return of Regular Army officers to their previous Regular Army grades, Seitz did not receive promotion to the grade of brigadier general until just before his service in the Korean War in 1953. One of his assignments after World War II was to return to Germany in 1950 for another tour as commander of the 26th Infantry Regiment on occupation duty. In the final weeks of the Korean War, Seitz was appointed Assistant Division Commander of the 45th Infantry Division (United States) at his new grade of brigadier general. He remained in Korea after the war and soon was appointed Commanding General of the 2nd Infantry Division. Seitz's duties during the tense aftermath of the Korean War armistice included intensive training of the Republic of Korea Army. He returned to the United States in September 1954 and was promoted to major general. Among Seitz's assignments after his service in Korea and before his assignment as Deputy Commander of the 1st U.S. Army were Commander of Camp Kilmer, New Jersey and Chief of the New Jersey Military District, 1954–1956; Chief of the Military Assistance Advisory Group, Iran, 1956–1958; Chief of Staff of the 1st United States Army at Fort Jay on Governors Island, New York 1958–1961; and Chief of Staff of the North Atlantic Treaty Organization (NATO) Allied Forces, Southern Europe 1962–1964.

== Early life and career ==
John F. R. Seitz was born on May 22, 1908, in Wilmington, Delaware, where he attended elementary school and Salesianum High School. His parents were George Hilary Seitz and Margaret Jane Collins Seitz. He had five siblings. A brother, Collins J. Seitz, was a judge of the United States Court of Appeals for the Third Circuit from 1966 until 1998.

Seitz was appointed to the United States Military Academy (West Point) at West Point, New York by United States Senator Thomas F. Bayard, Jr. of Delaware. Seitz entered West Point in July 1925 at the age of just 17 years, 40 days. As a play on his initials, Seitz's classmates nicknamed him first "Jeffer", then "Jeff." Seitz liked the nickname and it stayed with him throughout his life. (Note: The nickname was passed along to a son and grandson of the same name. Thompson, Assembly, 1979, p. 137.)

After his graduation from West Point in the Class of 1929, Second Lieutenant Seitz was assigned to the 1st Infantry Division at Fort Hamilton, New York. Soon thereafter, he became an aide de camp to Brigadier General John H. Humphreys at Fort Snelling, Minnesota. Assignments to the United States Army Infantry School at Fort Benning, Georgia, in the Philippines and in 1939 as a captain of the 30th United States Infantry Regiment at the Presidio in San Francisco followed.

== World War II ==
=== Pearl Harbor and staff assignments ===
Major Seitz was in command of an infantry battalion at Schofield Barracks on the island of Oahu, Hawaii on December 7, 1941, when forces of the Empire of Japan launched their surprise attack on the United States naval base at Pearl Harbor and nearby U.S. military installations. After the attack on Pearl Harbor, Seitz was called to Washington, D.C., to serve as deputy director of the International Division, Army Service Forces, originally the United States Army Services of Supply, in 1942 and part of 1943. On March 24, 1943, a plan was prepared for the military government of Sicily after its expected occupation by the Allies. Upon completion of the plan, at the conclusion of his service in Washington in May 1943, Seitz served on the staff of the 15th Army Group in the Mediterranean Theater of Operations. According to a subsequent report by Brigadier General Charles Spofford, the three key officers for implementation of the plan in supply, public safety and public health, including Lieutenant Colonel Seitz, as Director of Civilian Supply and Resources, did not arrive in the theater until the end of May due to transport problems.

=== Colonel 26th U.S. Infantry Regiment ===
From November 8, 1942, to August 16, 1943, the 26th Infantry Regiment, as a unit of the 1st Infantry Division, fought in the North African campaign and the Allied Invasion of Sicily. (Note: Lieutenant General George S. Patton, commander of the 7th United States Army, specifically requested that the 1st Infantry Division be assigned to the Sicily operation. Wheeler, 2007, p. 228.) On August 6, 1943, Major General Clarence R. Huebner took command of the 1st Infantry Division. Huebner remained commander of the division until December 11, 1944, when he was promoted to assistant commander of the V Corps (United States). In January 1945, Huebner became V Corps commander. The 1st Infantry Division's role in the Sicily Campaign ended on August 16, 1943. The division stayed in Sicily until late October while Huebner made efforts to restore the division's morale and self-confidence through measures to protect against or recover from malaria, and to provide for rest, recreation, training and physical conditioning.

On October 18–21, 1943, the 1st Infantry Division boarded transports for England. They arrived in Liverpool on November 5, 1943, and, after a few weeks, Huebner ordered a resumption of training. After brief service as executive officer of the 26th Infantry Regiment, Colonel Seitz took command of the regiment on November 14, 1943. (Note: Thompson, 1979, p. 136 gives the date as November 26, 1943.) (Note: Thompson, 1979, p. 136 states that Seitz was promoted to full colonel on May 6, 1944. This was his Regular Army grade. The U.S. Army Order of Battle for the European Theater of Operations, 1st Infantry Division, p. 1 shows Seitz as a colonel on the date of his appointment to regimental command, which would have been his grade in the Army of the United States at the time.)

=== Training ===
In 1940, the 1st Infantry Division converted to a "triangular" structure with a complement of about 14,000 soldiers assigned to various units. The division's units were a headquarters, the 16th Infantry Regiment, 18th Infantry Regiment and 26th Infantry Regiment, battalions of the 5th Field Artillery Regiment, 7th Field Artillery Regiment, 32nd Field Artillery Regiment and 33rd Field Artillery Regiment and the 1st Reconnaissance Troop with support by the 1st Medical Battalion, 1st Quartermaster Company, 1st Signal Company and 1st Ordnance Company. (Note: After large scale maneuvers in 1940, the Regular Army adopted the triangular division structure. National Guard divisions adopted this structure in 1942. Wheeler, 2007, p. 131.) In the Sicily Campaign, the division mixed infantry and armor and also supported the combat teams with the division's artillery and combat service support units. Tank and tank destroyer companies later were directly assigned to the regiments for campaigns in France.

By the start of the campaign in France in 1944, the 1st Infantry Division regiments had trained as, and had fought as, fully integrated regimental combat teams with the infantry reinforced by artillery, tank and tank destroyer battalions, engineers, medical staff and signal staff. (Note: As used by the sources or as the context requires, in this article the 26th Infantry Regiment and other infantry regiments operating as whole combat teams usually will be referred to as CT 26 (or the other regiments' number), while the individual battalions will be referred to by their battalion number and 26th Infantry Regiment (or other regiments' number).) At times during the campaign in France, the 1st Infantry Division's regimental combat teams, often with motorized transport, worked in combination with armored divisions as combat commands (CC).

Seitz and his battalion commanders occasionally had to face a slack attitude from a few veterans of the North Africa and Sicily campaigns who appeared to believe that they deserved to relax or were already adequately trained for combat. Seitz did not hesitate to relieve an officer who displayed this attitude. Hard training and practice for various conditions prepared the regimental combat team for the difficult operations ahead.

=== D-Day ===
The Allied plan for the D-Day landing on Omaha Beach had the 1st Infantry Division's 16th and 18th Infantry Regiments, reinforced by the 29th United States Infantry Division's 115th Infantry Regiment (United States) and 116th Infantry Regiment (United States) and the 741st Tank Battalion, 743rd Tank Battalion and 745th Tank Battalion, landing first and driving south. The 29th Infantry Division, with the 1st Infantry Division's 26th Infantry Regiment, was to land after the 1st Division. When the beachhead was secure, the plan was for the 115th, 116th and 26th Infantry Regiments to return to their own divisions.

Accompanying the 26th Infantry Regiment as part of CT 26 under Seitz's command were a battalion of the 33rd Field Artillery Regiment; Company C, 1st Engineer Battalion; Company C, 1st Medical Battalion and a detachment of the 1st Signal Battalion. The first wave of the assault hit the beach at about 6:30 a.m. Despite heavy losses, about 9:00 a.m., the 16th and 116th Infantry Infantry Regiments began to advance in small groups, assisted by close-in naval gunfire. Soon they were infiltrating the bluffs, clearing the enemy and moving inland. The 115th and 18th Infantry Regiments landed about 11:00 a.m. Finally, the commander of the V Corps divisions, Lieutenant General Leonard T. Gerow ordered Colonel Seitz to proceed with the landing of the 26th Infantry Regiment on Omaha Beach and to relieve the 16th Infantry Regiment. The 16th Infantry Regiment had taken too many casualties to continue the offensive, but had cleared the way so the 26th Infantry Regiment avoided the heaviest resistance at the beach. (Note: Nonetheless, some men were lost during the operation, especially when they were disembarked in water above their heads and were weighed down by heavy loads. Such loads often flipped a man who inflated his life belt. Weingartner, 1996, p. 54.)

Because of the casualties suffered by the 16th Infantry Regiment, Seitz had to send the 1st Battalion, 26th Infantry Regiment, reinforced by a company of the 745th Tank Battalion, about 500 metres (1,600 ft) inland to protect the left flank of the 1st Infantry Division and to try to take Mount Cauvin, the original objective of the 3rd battalion, 16th Infantry Regiment. Meanwhile, Seitz led the 2nd and 3rd Battalions of the 26th Infantry Regiment about 1 mile (1.6 km) south of the beach to fill a gap in the division's lines. Then the two battalions of the 26th Infantry Regiment assumed defensive positions southeast of Saint-Laurent-sur-Mer and prepared to attack Formigny.

=== Breakout and Advance ===
During the night of June 6–7, 1944, most of the 745th Tank Battalion came ashore and reinforced the 16th, 18th and 26th regimental combat teams. On June 7, the 1st Battalion, 26th Infantry Regiment, while still attached to CT 16, moved south to Russy and east to the important vantage point of Mount Cauvin, where they met up with British commandos. Early in the day, the 3rd battalion, 26th Infantry Regiment, joined CT 18 for the main effort to capture still untaken D-Day objectives. By mid-day on June 7, the 3rd Battalion, 26th Infantry Regiment was cleared to move to Mosles and in the late afternoon, Major General Huebner released the 2nd Battalion, 26th Infantry Regiment, which had been held in reserve, to join them. At the end of the day on June 7, little German resistance remained north of the Aure River. The 1st Battalion, 26th Infantry then was returned to Colonel Seitz's command.

During the night of June 7–8, 1944, the 2nd Battalion, 26th Infantry Regiment arrived at Mosles. The 3rd Battalion of the regiment did not join them until afternoon on June 8. Seitz ordered the 1st Battalion, 26th Infantry Regiment to take the town of Tour-en-Bessin from the north, but they were slowed by German resistance. When Seitz discovered that the 2nd Battalion was approaching from the south, he had the 1st Battalion halt their advance. The 2nd Battalion took the town and the two battalions avoided running into each other. At 6:00 p.m., the 3rd Battalion, 26th Infantry Regiment, with a company from the 745th Tank Battalion, moved to nearby Ste. Anne, arriving about 1:00 a.m. on June 9. The Germans counterattacked at Ste. Anne, inflicting heavy casualties on Company L of CT 26. This counterattack allowed most of the German troops in the area to avoid encirclement by CT 26 and the British, who were unable to hold their nearby positions after German counterattacks at Sully and Vaucelles.

On June 9, 1944, Lieutenant General Gerow ordered the 1st, 2nd and 29th Infantry Divisions to continue to attack to the south, which led to the difficult and bloody fighting in the hedgerows of the Bocage. CT 26, including a company of tanks, advanced to the village of Angey by 9:00 p.m. CT 26 advanced small distances on June 10 and 11, keeping pace with CT 18 to its west and the British force to its east. On June 11, Seitz sent the 1st Battalion, 26th Infantry Regiment down the wrong road and they advanced into the British Army sector. The British redirected the battalion and they subsequently outflanked a German unit and took many prisoners. If the battalion had taken the other road, they would have run unexpectedly into the Germans head on and likely suffered many casualties. On June 12, 1944, CT 18 and CT 26 attacked to the south toward Caumont-l'Éventé. CT 26 reached the village by dusk and found it was defended in strength by German forces. On June 13, the 2nd Battalion of CT 26 seized Caumont-l'Éventé and the 1st Battalion of CT 26 cleared the ridge east of town.

=== Caumont-l'Éventé ===
The 1st Infantry Division had driven about 23 miles (37 km) south of Omaha Beach in the first week after the Allied landings, the deepest penetration of any unit from the beach. At that time, Lieutenant General Gerow ordered Major General Huebner to consolidate the positions then occupied by the 1st Infantry Division because the British Army had been stopped to the east of the division's positions by determined German defenders. CT 26 held Caumont until mid-July while other units of the 1st U.S. Army carried on attacks to the south. Patrols into the Bocage and shelling by German artillery strained the troops and inflicted a small stream of casualties while the 1st Infantry Division held their line. Since CT 26 held a forward position in a salient between the British Army and other 1st U.S. Army forces at Caumont, CT 26 was subject to frequent shelling and a few determined German efforts to retake Caumont.

Efforts to move forward by the other divisions of the 1st U.S. Army also stalled in the Bocage, so the Allied penetration into Normandy was still shallow a month after the initial push off the beaches. The Allies needed a new plan to break out of Normandy. Pursuant to that new plan, on July 13, 1944, the 1st Infantry Division was ordered to move 50 kilometres (31 mi) to the northwest of Caumont and assemble near Colombières. CT 26 arrived at the assembly point by July 15. During CT 26's brief stay at Colombières, Colonel Seitz and his staff attended the funeral of the regiment's World War I commander, Brigadier General Theodore "Teddy" Roosevelt, Jr.

On July 19–20, the 1st Infantry Division moved to a location near Sainte-Jean-de-Daye, about 5 kilometres (3.1 mi) north of the line of departure for Operation Cobra, the Allied forces breakout from Normandy. The plan for the 1st Infantry Division, along with the 2nd Armored Division (United States) and 3rd Armored Division (United States), was to exploit an expected breakthrough of the German lines by other assault divisions of the 1st U.S. Army. Although the 1st Infantry Division and two armored divisions had landed and fought as V Corps (United States) units, for the breakthrough drive of Operation Cobra they were assigned to the command of Major General J. Lawton Collins and attached to the VII Corps (United States) on July 15, 1944. (Note: The 1st Infantry Division remained assigned to VII Corps until December 16, 1944 when the division was reassigned to V Corps at the start of the Battle of the Bulge. ETO-OB, 1945, pp. 8–9.)

=== Operation Cobra ===
Bad weather delayed Operation Cobra for about four days. Then, in an effort to give the ground forces close air support, American Eighth Air Force bombers attacked the German lines on July 24, 1944, which caused much damage and many casualties. Nonetheless, the operation was further delayed because bombs which fell short resulted in friendly fire casualties (25 killed and 131 wounded) and required forward units to pull back to avoid more casualties. Further bombing by the Eighth Air Force devastated the forward German positions on July 25, killing at least 1,000 German soldiers, but bombs that fell short also killed 111 American soldiers and wounded 490. (Note: Among the American dead was Lieutenant General Lesley J. McNair, commanding general of Army Ground Forces, who was in a forward position to observe the start of the offensive. Wheeler, 2007, p. 303.) After several hours, quick action by the 9th Infantry Division (United States) got the drive under way by noon on July 25. By this time, the German forces were alert for an attack, especially after the second friendly fire tragedy. Initial German resistance was heavy. By late afternoon, the VII Corps assault force had made sufficient progress so Lieutenant General Collins ordered the 1st Infantry Division to follow up the advance by moving south toward St. Gilles and Marigny.

On July 28, 1944, exploiting the advances by CT 16 and CT 18, Seitz moved CT 26 through Marigny and to high ground south of Guesnay. CT 26 met little resistance because the Germans had retreated about 15 minutes before the regimental combat team arrived. Along with the 3rd Armored Division, the 1st Infantry Division, with motorized (truck) transport, was designated as Combat Command A (CCA) for the following operation to the south. CCA's mission was to cut off the German positions in western Normandy and to provide the opening for Allied forces to move into Brittany. (Note: The 4th Infantry Division and 2nd Armored Division were Combat Command B and for a time were reinforced by the 1st Battalion, 26th Infantry Regiment.) On July 30, 1944, the 3rd Armored Division moved into Hambye but had to repair a bridge to move forward. CT 26 forded the stream and drove off German machine gunners so that work on the bridge could begin. The 3rd Battalion, 26th Infantry Regiment established a bridgehead and beat off a counterattack, enabling the engineers to finish their work on the bridge by late afternoon.

=== Pursuit to the Siegfried Line ===
By August 6, 1944, CT 26 had driven to Mortain where the 1st Battalion was attached to Combat Command B. CT 26 drove the farthest south of any 1st U.S. Army unit and on August 8–9 turned northwest at Mayenne as part of the effort to encircle the Germans still in the Argentan-Falaise pocket. By August 13, CT 26 had occupied Couterne. Seitz leapfrogged his battalions and pushed them to close on the German forces as CT 26 reached the south flank of the Falaise pocket. CT 26's troops moved mostly on trucks and stopped for occasional firefights during this advance. Finally, by August 15, 1944, CT 26 reached the location where the Germans were fleeing eastward, about 1,500 yards (1,400 m) north of La Ferté-Macé. CT 26 could not fire on the fleeing enemy because they might subject other Allied units just beyond the German line to friendly fire. While the 1st Infantry Division held the ground south of the pocket, for the next eight days other Allied troops attempted to complete the encirclement of the Germans between Falaise and Argentan, with only partial success.

At least 20 German divisions escaped the Falaise Pocket and fled east. On August 24, 1944, the 1st Infantry Division participated in the fast pursuit of the fleeing Germans for 170 miles (270 km) to the east to Corbeil, on the Seine River. The 1st Infantry Division crossed the Seine on pontoon bridges on August 27. The 1st United States Army and 3rd United States Army and 2nd British Army aimed to prevent the Germans from getting to the Siegfried Line or Westwall of fortifications on the German border with Belgium where they might set up a more stout defense. The 1st Infantry Division cleared German resistance from Soissons and reached Laon on August 31.

CT 26 moved 85 miles (137 km) from Soissons to Vervins on September 1, 1944, and after another move of 27 miles (43 km) to Avesnes, Belgium, the next day, Seitz's troops caught up with the Germans heading toward Mons. At the same time, the 3rd Armored Division cut off the German Army's escape route to Germany through Liège. In the Mons Pocket between Maubeuge and Bettignies, on September 3, the 1st Battalion, 26th Infantry captured thousands of prisoners while suffering few casualties. (Note: The 16th Infantry Regiment and 3rd Armored Division captured more prisoners that same day so the Germans lost over 25,000 soldiers taken prisoner at Mons. Wheeler, 2007, p. 312.) On September 6, Major General Huebner ordered CT 18 and CT 26 to drive to the German border. On September 6, the 1st Battalion, 26th Infantry Regiment was attached to the 3rd Armored Division as part of Combat Command B (CCB). On September 7, 1944, CT 26 reached Eghezee, Belgium. Until September 12, CCB was able to clear any resistance that was encountered and advance toward the border. By this time, the 1st U.S. Army had outrun its supply line (logistics) and had less than five days supply of artillery ammunition while two-thirds of its tanks required maintenance to put them back in operation. Also, the men were tired from more than 90 days of battle. The ensuing limitations and delays in the 1st U.S. Army's advance and the initial approach of the renewed operation away from the City of Aachen allowed the Germans to reorganize their defenses and to move reinforcements into the almost undefended city.

=== The Siegfried Line or Westwall ===
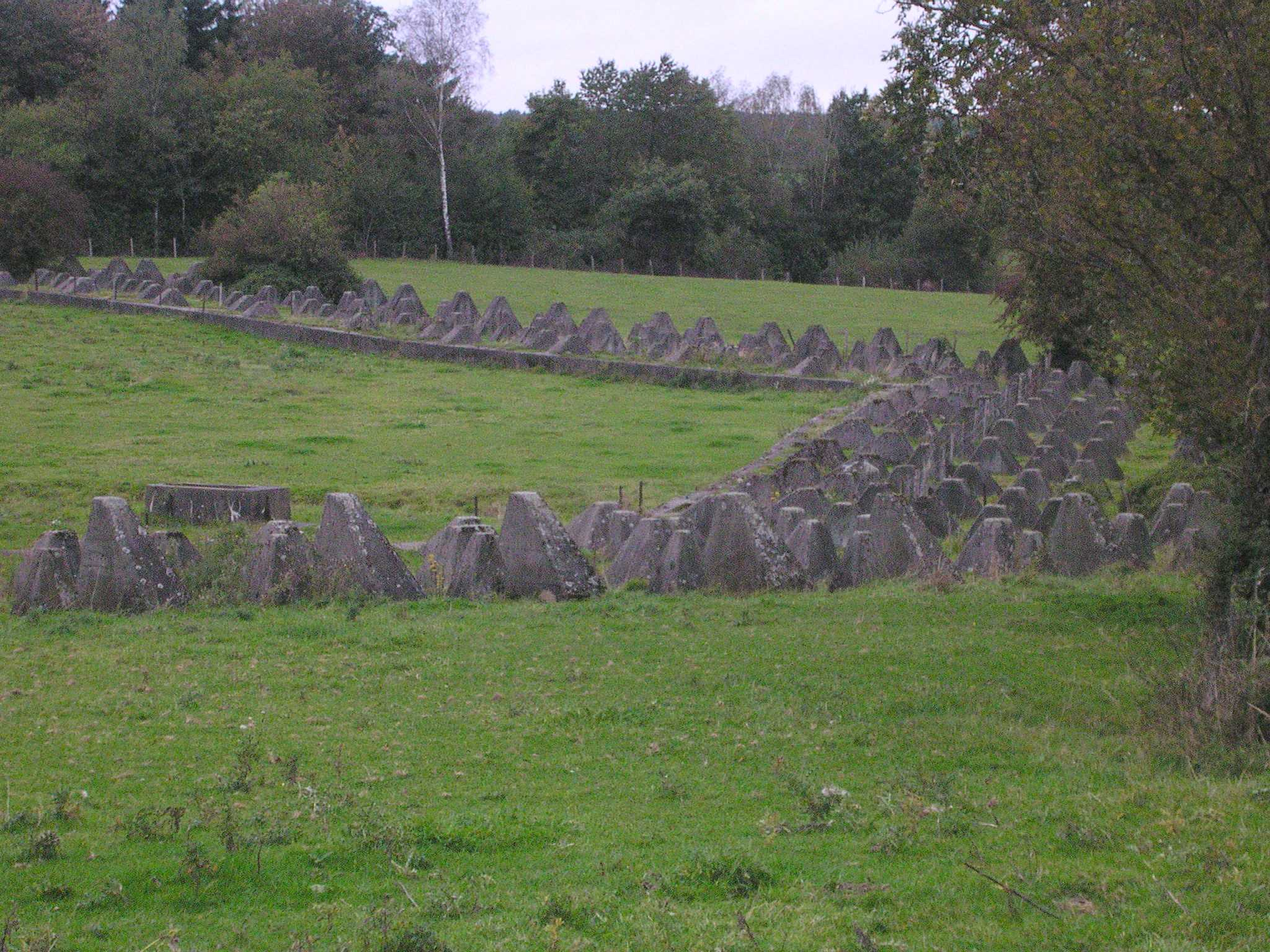
Siegfried Line dragon's teeth near Aachen, 2004

The Siegfried Line or Westwall of German border defenses around Aachen Forest and the city of Aachen had a line of dragon's teeth and pillboxes (the Scharnhorst Line) near the border. A second set of more extensive fortifications (the Schill Line) was 7 kilometres (4.3 mi) inside Germany. The city of Aachen was defensible despite being ringed by hills. Although the city was nearly undefended when the 1st Infantry Division arrived in the area, the subsequent delays in the 1st U.S. Army advance allowed German Army reinforcements to reach the city and set up a heavy defense before American commanders decided the city had to be taken.

Although the 1st U.S. Army's supplies needed replenishing, Major General Collins asked Lieutenant General Hodges to allow his three VII Corps divisions, including the 1st Infantry Division, to attack the Westwall. He surmised the defenders might be demoralized or even in flight. Hodges approved the request but cautioned against launching a major attack while supplies, including artillery ammunition, were low. Collins ordered the 1st Infantry Division to probe the Westwall and exploit any weak points with the ultimate objective of encircling Aachen. On September 12, 1944, two battalions of CT 16 moved against bunkers 6 miles (9.7 km) southeast of Aachen, ran into heavy resistance and had to call for reinforcements. On the same day, Major General Huebner viewed Aachen from a nearby hill and concluded that the city would be difficult to take. Collins also realized that the Siegfried Line was well-manned and his effort to take the German border defenses quickly and easily had failed.

On September 13, 1944, the 3rd Battalion, 26th Infantry Regiment supported CT 16's push north while the 1st Battalion of the 26th was detached from the Task Force Hogan (commanded by Lieutenant Colonel Samuel Hogan, commander of the 3rd Battalion, 33rd Armor Regiment) unit of Combat Command B (CCB) and placed with Combat Command A (CCA). During the rest of September, the other battalions of CT 26 consolidated positions and tested German defenses near the southern edge of Aachen with help from the 33rd Field Artillery's counterbattery fire. Meanwhile, the 1st Battalion, 26th Infantry Regiment reinforced CCA and attacked the line of dragon's teeth in the Westwall in an effort to advance 1,500 metres (1,600 yd) to 2,000 metres (2,200 yd) to the northeast toward the town of Nütheim. Despite the loss of 3 platoon leaders, Company A of the 1st Battalion moved through the defenses during twilight, accompanied only by its forward observer's tank. Companies B and C of the 1st Battalion advanced as darkness fell. Their objective was to clear German positions that had destroyed 12 CCA tanks and were holding up progress of U.S. forces. After Company A cut German communication lines, the detached companies rejoined the entire 1st Battalion as they assembled west of Nütheim at about 10:00 p.m.

On September 14, 1944, companies of the 1st Battalion, 26th Infantry Regiment coordinated actions with tanks of CCA in order to overcome the defenders of pillboxes and provide paths through the defenses. The drive stalled, however, as the Germans were able to bring reinforcements to the area on September 16 and 17 enabling them to prevent an immediate further advance by the VII Corps divisions. Over 4 days, CCB captured Weisenberg, an area of high ground north of Mausbach, but could go no further. The 1st Battalion, 26th Infantry Regiment was reduced to 40 percent strength and the tank companies of the 3rd Armored Division had fewer than 20 operational tanks each and could not continue to advance.

On September 14 and 15, 1944, the 2nd and 3rd Battalions, 26th Infantry Regiment, advanced to the southeast edge of Aachen with the 3rd Battalion, 26th Infantry Regiment to their left and 3rd Battalion, 18th Infantry Regiment to their right. There they held defensive positions until Colonel Seitz was ordered to take Aachen almost a month later. On September 16, the 12th Infantry Division (Wehrmacht) arrived to reinforce the defenders in the area.

=== Battle of Aachen ===
After the initial American breakthrough of the Westwall on September 14, 1944, supply shortages prevented the VII Corps from coordinating a major attack to promptly follow up the local breakthroughs. The VII Corps did not have enough supplies or reinforcements to advance through the Westwall or to promptly surround and take the City of Aachen. The long supply line from Normandy and the diversion of supplies and transport to the ultimately unsuccessful Operation Market Garden delayed delivery of sufficient supplies needed for further advances until mid-October. (Note: "October was destined to be the worst month in matters of supply the Allies were to experience during the campaign on the continent." MacDonald, Charles B. The Siegfried Line Campaign. Washington, D.C.: Center Of Military History, United States Army, 1990. Originally published 1963. OCLC 455971877. pp. 382–83.) The VII Corps was unable to bypass Aachen and drive through the Stolberg Corridor northeast of the city in order to breach the Schill Line, especially because the reinforced Aachen garrison would remain a danger in their rear if the U.S. forces went past them. The VII Corps and XIX Corps were unable to begin a drive to encircle the city of Aachen until October 1, 1944. The City of Aachen was a formidable obstacle for the American forces because it was located between the two lines of the Westwall and could hinder an advance on the Rhine if German forces remained there, not because the terrain of the city and surrounding area was difficult to traverse. During the delay, the Germans were able to better organize their defenses and to move in reinforcements. On October 7, 1944, CT 18 launched an attack against Verlautenheide and two hills northeast of the city which were about 300 feet (91 m) to 500 feet (150 m) in height in order to finish the encirclement of Aachen. On October 8, VII Corps commander Lieutenant General Collins sent more troops to the 1st Infantry Division and a force from the 9th U.S. Army to seal off the west side of Aachen in order to prevent the defenders from escaping. By October 9, the 1st Infantry Division had surrounded the city although some German units remained in the area.

In the days preceding the attack on the city of Aachen, Seitz sent patrols to the outskirts of the city to determine German Army strength and to gather intelligence for the siting of artillery and for the assault. On October 8, 1944, a reinforced platoon from Company F of CT 26 gained a foothold in the factory area of the city to the southeast of the railroad tracks. On October 9, Companies F and G cleared buildings on the southeast side of the railroad track in the face of stout resistance by the German defenders, although they lost a tank destroyer and had a tank damaged in the process. On October 10, Major General Huebner ordered Seitz to send two officers into Aachen with an ultimatum requiring the Germans to surrender unconditionally within 24 hours or to face artillery fire that would destroy the city and remaining resistance. Huebner also told Seitz not to get into a major engagement in Aachen if his force became tied down. (Note: Seitz sent Lieutenant Cedric A. Lafley, Lieutenant William Boehme and Private First Class Ken Kading with the ultimatum. Mason, 1999, p. 15.)

The 1106th Engineer Combat group was the only unit available to take over part of CT 26's position in the line of the defense to the south of the city. To reduce the length of his front line before the assault on the city, Seitz moved a provisional company to face Aachen from the southwest and to tie in with the 1106th Engineer group. Seitz had to prepare to assault the city with only the 2nd and 3rd Battalions of CT 26 because the 1st Battalion needed to recover and train replacements after losses in their September attacks against the Siegfried Line. On October 11, 1944, the local German commander at Aachen, Colonel Gerhardt Wilck, refused to surrender the German forces in the city. Seitz then had the mission of capturing the first German city to fall to the Allies in World War II, the ancient capital of the first Holy Roman Emperor, Charlemagne. (Note: During the eighth century, Charlemagne made Aix, later Aix-la-Chappelle, and later still Aachen, the capital of the Holy Roman Empire. Mason, 1999 p. 3.) This would give the 1st U.S. Army a good base, free of a pocket of enemy in the rear, to move on toward the Rhine.

Since Seitz had no information about the number and location of enemy troops in Aachen despite the efforts of his patrols, he planned to use artillery fire support and close air support to prepare the way for his men to advance. At noon Seitz started the assault with his two available battalions supported by fighter-bomber air strikes, 1st Infantry Division artillery, including forward observers with the infantry, squads of engineers with flamethrowers and dynamite charges and about two tanks and two tank destroyers for support of each company. (Note: Wheeler, 2007, p. 338, states that a tank or tank destroyer was with each platoon.) Certain men were assigned to protect the armored vehicles from defenders with anti-tank weapons such as panzerfausts. About 300 U.S. fighter-bombers hit targets around the perimeter of the city as the assault began. The Germans had about 5,000 defenders in Aachen and outnumbered the available men in CT 26's two assault battalions by about 3 to 1 but the Americans had more firepower with their artillery, tanks, tank destroyers and 155 mm (6.1 in) rifles.

Seitz started the operation by moving the 2nd Battalion of CT 26 to the railroad embankment of the Aachen-Cologne line tracks to prepare the battalion for a strike toward the center of Aachen from the east, rather than the more obvious directions of south or west, on October 13. He also sent the 3rd Battalion of CT 26 to attack from southeast to northwest into the city's factory district along a front of about 2,000 yards (1,800 m) filled with buildings. He instructed the 3rd Battalion to maintain contact with the 2nd Battalion. The 2nd Battalion under Lieutenant Colonel Derrill M. Daniel advanced on the left toward the center of the city and the 3rd Battalion under Lieutenant Colonel John Corley advanced on the right with the objective of clearing the factory area and moving to the hills on the northern side of the city, which were used as a public park named Lousberg. Each company was given a definite sector of the city to secure and was instructed to report their progress and position as they cleared each block. The 3rd Battalion slowly pushed forward so that on October 13, the 2nd Battalion could begin the main assault through the city with a secure flank. Seitz also took a company of the 1st Battalion from the reserve to clear an area along the tracks and protect the southern flank of the assaulting battalions. Seitz deployed a composite company from Regimental Headquarters, the headquarters company and the anti-tank company to hold the rest of the southern section of the line.

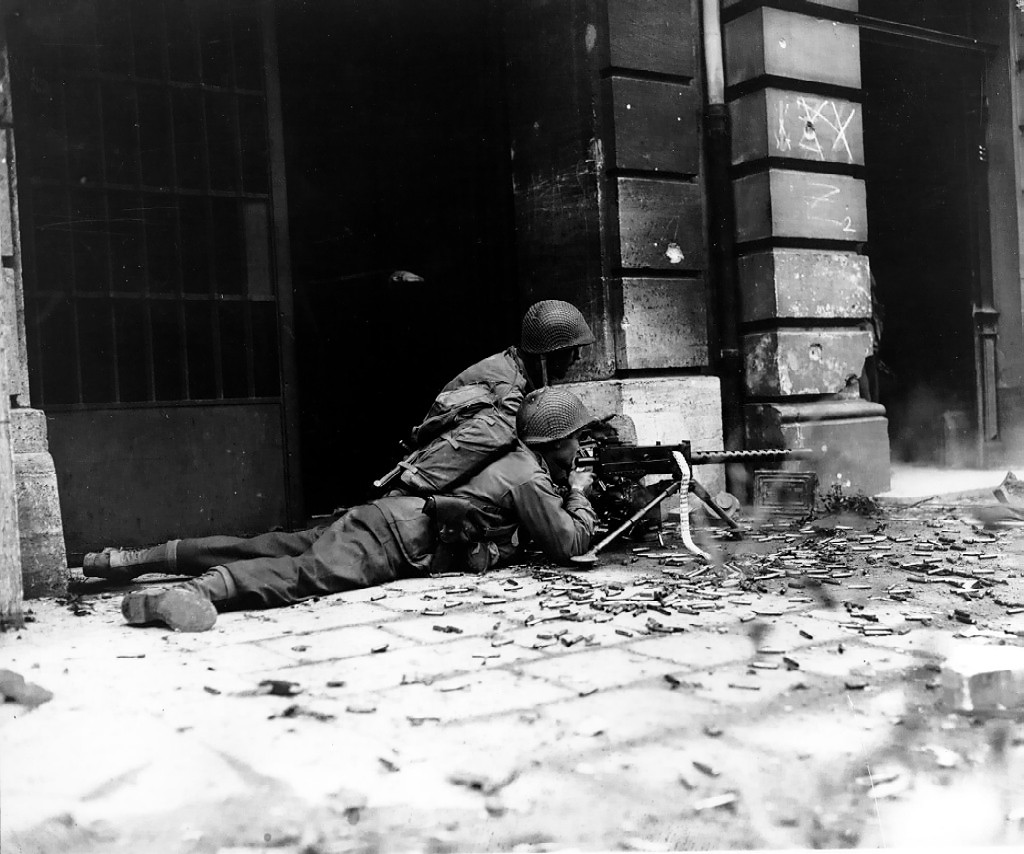
GI machine gun crew in Aachen

For eight days, CT 26 cleared stubborn resistance across the city of Aachen, which required every building and cellar to be searched and enemy troops killed or captured. Objectives normally assigned to larger units had to be taken by companies, even platoons. Artillery and mortar fire prepared the way for the riflemen supported by a tank or tank destroyer. To limit time in the streets as they advanced, CT 26 progressed through connected cellars where available or knocked out the walls from one building to the next to stay inside. After Lieutenant Colonel Corley called for a 155-mm rifle and demonstrated that it could knock down substantial stone walls that withstood bombardment from tanks, Seitz sent one of the big rifles to support Lieutenant Colonel Daniels's battalion as well. The Germans stiffly resisted CT 26's attack against the center of the city, Farwick Park and its buildings, and even briefly recaptured some ground in fierce counterattacks.

On October 16, 1944, Major General Huebner ordered Colonel Seitz to halt his men in place in order to permit other 1st Infantry Division units to repulse German Army counterattacks on the U.S. Army line near Eilendorf, a village a few miles to the northeast of Aachen, and to provide time for reinforcements to reach CT 26. CT 16 defeated the German counterattack on the Americans surrounding Aachen the next day. On October 18, Task Force Hogan, two battalions of tanks and armored infantry of the 3rd Armored Division, were sent into the fight in Aachen on the north flank of Lieutenant Colonel Corley's 2nd Battalion. Huebner then permitted renewal of the assault. On October 19, the 2nd Battalion, 110th Infantry Regiment (United States), further reinforced CT 26 on the left of CT 26's 2nd Battalion.

On October 21, 1944, as the 2nd Battalion closed in on an air raid shelter, which they did not know was the command bunker of Colonel Wilck, and were bringing up their 155-mm rifle, Wilck sent two American prisoners out with a white flag and with a message that the Germans wished to surrender. At 12:05 p.m. on October 21, Wilck surrendered at Lieutenant Colonel Corley's command post to Brigadier General George A. Taylor, Assistant Division Commander, 1st Infantry Division, who arrived there just before the surrender occurred. Wilck said the power and effectiveness of the 155-mm rifles and tanks in the capture of the city dismayed the defenders. As sunset on October 21, 1944, approached, all the CT 26 companies had cleared their areas. (Note: CT 26 had 498 casualties including 75 killed and 9 missing in the battle to take Aachen; 3,473 Germans surrendered. MacDonald, 1990, pp. 317–18. Gott states that about 2,000 Germans, which would have been most of the remaining soldiers in the garrison, were killed or wounded. Gott, Kendall D. Breaking the Mold: Tanks in the Cities. Fort Leavenworth, KS: Combat Studies Institute Press, 2006. ISBN 978-0160762239. p. 18.)

Seitz commented that CT 26 succeeded in capturing Aachen by employing "common sense, normal tactical principles, and maximum firepower." Lieutenant Robert Botsford, who was a reporter and editor in civilian life, was sent to provide a report on the city after the battle. He wrote that the city was as dead as a Roman ruin but with none of the grace of gradual decay. Historian James Scott Wheeler listed Aachen as one of the most important offensives of the two world wars. Correspondent Drew Middleton wrote that "Aachen was a great battle...it was the first German city to be taken by an invading army in over a hundred years....I am sure we would find the capture of Aachen by the 1st Division ranked high among the defeats that convinced the high command of the German Army that it had lost the war."

=== Battle of the Hürtgen Forest ===
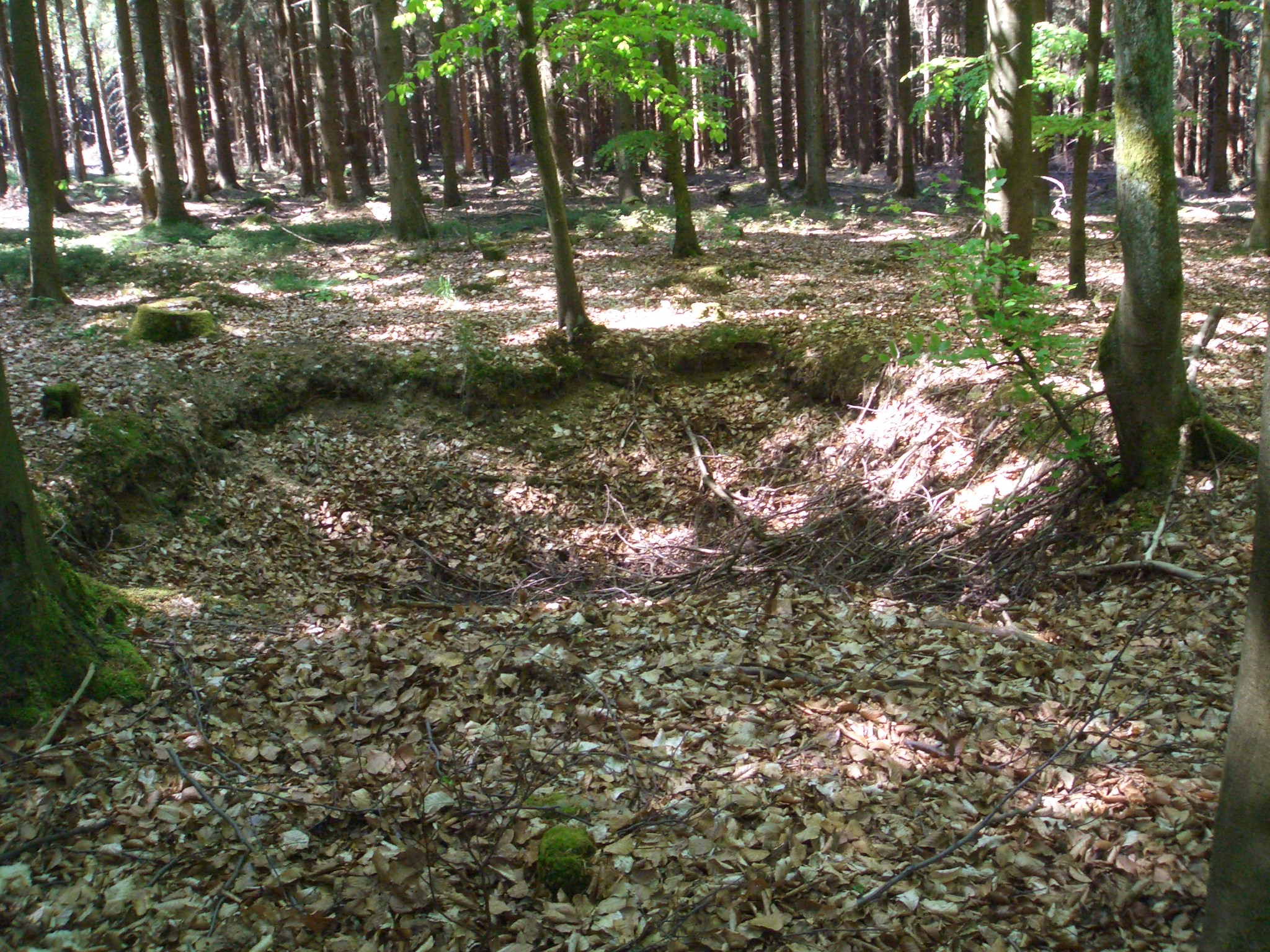
Bomb crater remains in Hürtgen Forest, 2008

Continuing supply problems delayed the next 1st U.S. Army offensive until November 16, 1944. Lieutenant General Collins added the 104th Infantry Division (United States) to the VII Corps in early November and had that unit occupy the positions held by the 1st Infantry Division east of Aachen. The 1st Infantry Division was on the left of the line for the new offensive. The 47th Infantry Regiment was added to the 1st Infantry Division, which in turn was moved to a small area between Mausbach to just east of Schevenhütte. This was the center of the line where the main effort was expected. The 4th Infantry Division was moved on to the left of the line. The corps had the mission of capturing the Roer River crossings by attacking northeast through the Hürtgen Forest between Jülich and Düren, a most difficult route over unfavorable terrain on which to advance. (Note: The 3rd Armored Division was to make a limited attack to take the Hastenrath area. Wheeler, 2007, pp. 343–44.)

The Hürtgen Forest was dense with trees on many steep ridges falling off into narrow valleys. The dense woods and soggy ground made tank support of the infantry difficult and in some places impossible. The Germans placed log-covered bunkers, minefields and barbed wire throughout the forest. They could use the few good roads for supply while the Americans had to cross muddy, unpaved ground, made worse by rain in early November. CT 16 and CT 26 were assigned to capture the high ground on either side of Wehe Creek in order to secure a road through the valley. CT 26's first objective was the capture of four hills around a castle named Laufenburg about halfway from Schevenhütte to Langerwehe on the eastern edge of the forest.

An air attack on the rear of German positions at the start of the campaign, Operation Queen, had to wait until November 16, 1944, for clear weather. (Note: Because the bombing was devised to avoid friendly fire casualties and to avoid making the ground impassable, it was done far behind the front line positions. Historian Edward G. Miller wrote "Few of the attacking troops would see any direct results of Queen." He noted that the Germans facing CT 26 were untouched by Queen. Miller, 1995, pp. 97, 117.) CT 16 and CT 18 were to begin their assignments by driving toward Wenaü and Heistern CT 26 attacked north through the forest using small arms because the terrain forced them to move without most of their supporting tanks and artillery against defenders who were equipped with artillery, mortars and machine guns. When the 2nd Battalion, 26th Infantry Regiment, was stopped by mines and barbed wire, Seitz ordered Company A to bypass the defenses through a ravine, but that route also was heavily defended and the company made little progress. Seitz ordered the men to dig in each night because of the intensity of the defense and close contact with the enemy. The combatants' outposts remained less than 100 yards (91 m) apart.

On November 19, 1944, Seitz ordered the 3rd Battalion, 26th Infantry Regiment to push through the 2nd Battalion positions. Led by a tank with a bulldozer blade, the 3rd Battalion was assigned to take Hill 272. (Note: For his heroic single-handed stand against a German counterattack for an hour on November 19, 1944, Private first class Francis X. McGraw received the Medal of Honor posthumously. MacDonald, 1990, pp. 420–21.) On November 20, as Seitz saw that a force of German counterattackers was about to retreat, he ordered the 1st Battalion, which was in reserve, to closely follow the retreat of the German counterattackers in order to seize the Laufenbürg castle and surrounding high ground, which was halfway through the Hüertgen Forest toward the Roer plain. As the 1st Battalion proceeded about 1 mile (1.6 km) to within a few hundred yards of the castle, Seitz became concerned that the regiment needed to secure the road before taking the high ground and was worried that his regiment had taken too many casualties (about 450) to continue an attack that would not be supported by artillery or tanks. (Note: Although MacDonald at least implies that the castle was not taken, Miller states that "the Americans took the remains of a Middle Ages castle...." Miller, 1995, p. 118.) At this time, Major General Huebner also became concerned that the 26th Infantry Regiment actually was getting too far ahead of the other units of the division, especially the beleaguered 18th Infantry Regiment, and directed Seitz to make only limited attacks and support the 18th Infantry Regiment until that regiment could catch up with the 26th Infantry Regiment.

On November 21, 1944, Seitz ordered the 1st Battalion, 26th Infantry Regiment to pass through the 3rd Battalion and to attack toward the northeast with the objectives of taking the town of Jüngersdorf and, later, the town of Merode. After two days of heavy fighting in cold rain and mud, the battalion had progressed only a few hundred yards while sustaining heavy losses in attacks against enemy strongpoints with little, if any, tank support. After clearing bypassed enemy positions on November 24 through 26, on November 27, the 2nd Battalion occupied Jüngersdorf. Huebner then directed Seitz to proceed to the next objective, Merode, which was beyond the edge of the forest and downhill, just 2 miles (3.2 km) southeast of Langerwehe.

On November 29, 1944, the 2nd Battalion, 26th Infantry Regiment passed through 1st Battalion positions and moved toward Merode. The 1st and 3rd battalions were tied up supporting adjacent American units and could not support the advance. With some artillery support and the machine gun platoons of Company H, Companies E and F reached the edge of the village. Their two tanks were knocked out and the commander of the two companies asked for additional armored support. Before help could be sent, the companies were wiped out with any members still alive captured by the enemy when a battalion of German paratroopers with tanks and artillery counterattacked them. Four men of the two companies escaped from Merode; 165 men were listed as missing in action. (Note: MacDonald, 1990, p. 491 states that a sergeant and 12 men from the battalion escaped the encirclement of Merode, although he gives the same number as missing, 165. Miller, 1995, p. 120 also mentions four men who escaped.) (Note: Edward G. Miller wrote that the results demonstrated what could happen when the Germans cut off American infantry from its supporting arms. Miller, 1995, p. 119.) A CT 26 combat patrol sent to reinforce the men at Merode was turned back by the German defenders. Major General Huebner, Colonel Seitz and Lieutenant Colonel Daniel did not know that the men in Merode had been killed or captured until later. Nonetheless, after other patrols failed to reach the village, they decided not to send a large contingent of additional men to reach any troops who might be holding out or to fight for Merode, especially because tank and artillery support could not be guaranteed. (Note: German artillery had blocked the only path from the American position into Merode when one of their shots overturned a U.S. tank and blocked the road. MacDonald, 2002, p. 171.)

The 1st Infantry Division progressed only 4 of the 7 miles through the forest but had cleared most of the German resistance there. After suffering heavy casualties in the effort to reach the Roer River through the Hürtgen Forest, the 1st Infantry Division handed their positions over to the 9th Infantry Division starting December 5, 1944. CT 18 and CT 26 withdrew to southeastern Belgium by December 7 and CT 16 withdrew between December 11 and 13. The 26th Infantry Regiment lost 1,479 men in the Hürtgen Forest, including 163 killed and 261 missing, which did not count losses from combat exhaustion, illness or weather-related injuries, more than any other regiment. Despite their heavy losses, all the units except the 2nd Battalion, 26th Infantry Regiment, were brought up to strength after they left the front line. However, the replacements were not yet fully trained due to the U.S. Army's personnel system being unable to keep up with training the number of replacements needed. On December 11, 1944, Major General Huebner became deputy commander of V Corps and soon thereafter became commander when Lieutenant General Gerow became commander of the new 15th United States Army. Brigadier General Clift Andrus became commander of the 1st Infantry Division.

=== Battle of the Bulge: Bütgenbach ===
After six months of almost constant campaigning and combat, the 1st Infantry Division units had been off the front line near Aubel, Belgium for only a few days when on December 16, 1944, three German field armies attacked the southern half of the 1st U.S. Army positions in Belgium in a surprise attack which was the start of the Battle of the Bulge. The V Corps came under attack first. The 2nd Infantry Division took up defensive positions between Krinkelt and Rocherath. The 99th Infantry Division (United States) withdrew through the 2nd Infantry Division positions, then both divisions dug in on Elsenborn Ridge, blocking German use of the two northern routes to the northeast. (Note: See also Battle of Lanzerath Ridge.) The VII Corps was ordered south to reinforce the V Corps. CT 26 was the first unit to move south and come under V Corps command. CT 26, which included the 26th Infantry Regiment, 33rd Field Artillery Battalion, Company C, 745th Tank Battalion and support units, moved to Camp Elsenborn, 25 miles (40 km) south of Verviers. (Note: U.S. Army historian Hugh Cole wrote: "The transfer of this regimental combat team to the V Corps would have a most important effect on the ensuing American defense." Cole, 1965, p. 86.)

Colonel Seitz was away on leave for a few days so on December 17, 1944, Lieutenant Colonel Edwin V. "Van" Sutherland, the executive officer of CT 26, and Lieutenant Colonel Francis J. "Frank" Murdoch deployed the regiment after receiving orders at the 99th Division's headquarters to occupy positions south and east of Bütgenbach, 7 kilometres (4.3 mi) south of Elsenborn. They determined that the crossroads of Dom Bütgenbach (Domaine Bütgenbach, a small hamlet) southeast of town was the key position as it blocked the roads north from Büllingen to the east and Moderscheid to the south. (Note: The German commander, Sepp Dietrich, had designated the road through Bütgenbach as the primary axis of advance. Weingartner, 1996, p. 96.) They deployed the regiment in an arc of foxholes across two hills on a 2,100 yards (1,900 m) front around the crossroads. By December 18, the German Sixth Panzer Army had failed to move through Elsenborn against the 99th Infantry Division and 2nd Infantry Division and turned to the south to try to open the route through Bütgenbach. The German commander, the notorious SS General (SS-Oberst-Gruppenführer) Sepp Dietrich, sent the 12th SS Panzer Division and 3rd Parachute Division to attack CT 26's position on the following day.

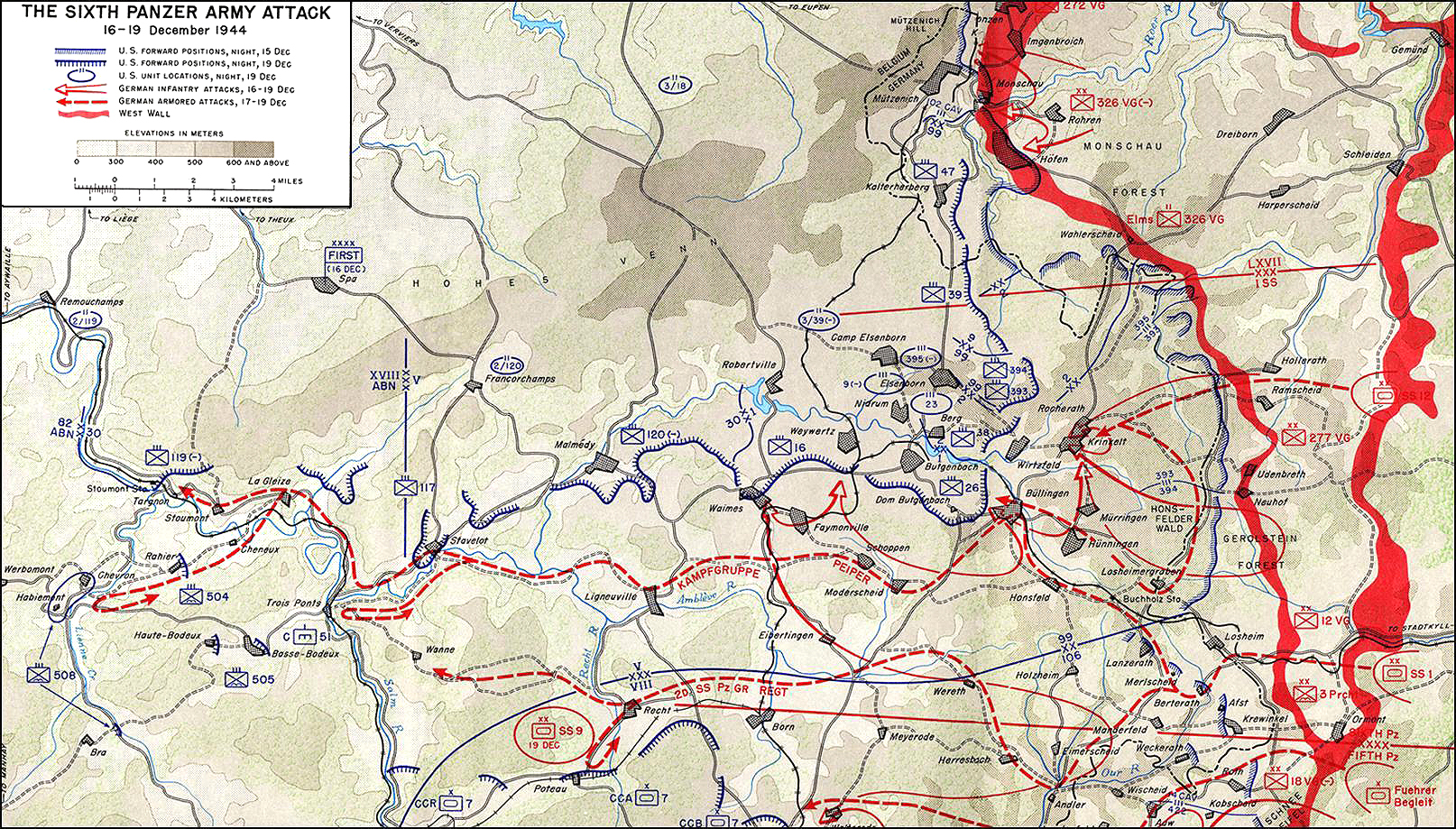
Sepp Dietrich led the Sixth Panzer Army in the northernmost attack route. The U.S. 26th Infantry Regiment and 33rd Field Artillery Regiment stopped the Sixth Panzer Army at Bütgenbach.

On December 19, 1944, as the main German effort of the Battle of the Bulge on that day focused on CT 26, Seitz returned to command. He found that CT 26 was separated from other U.S. Army units and would need to defend about 4 miles (6.4 km) of line with help only from the artillery and the benefit of a lake and a few streams that provided some flank defense. The 2nd Battalion, 26th Infantry Regiment, with about 90 per cent replacements due to the losses sustained by Companies E, F and G in the Hürtgen Forest, was in a forward salient, but they had time to prepare a defense and were supported by the 33rd Field Artillery Battalion. The German Army controlled nearby Büllingen where they gathered forces for an attack.

On December 19, the 2nd Battalion and 33rd Field Artillery of CT 26 beat off several German attacks, which were supported by 12 tanks. Companies E and F fought off tanks and a battalion of Panzergrenadiers but some German tanks passed through their lines, only to be stopped at Bütgenbach by V Corps artillery, tanks and tank destroyers. Field artillery and the infantry using antitank weapons drove off a second German attack. Later that day, the 2nd Battalion, 16th Infantry Regiment reinforced the 26th Infantry Regiment and the 3rd Battalion, 26th Infantry Regiment linked up with the 2nd Battalion in positions south of Weywertz.

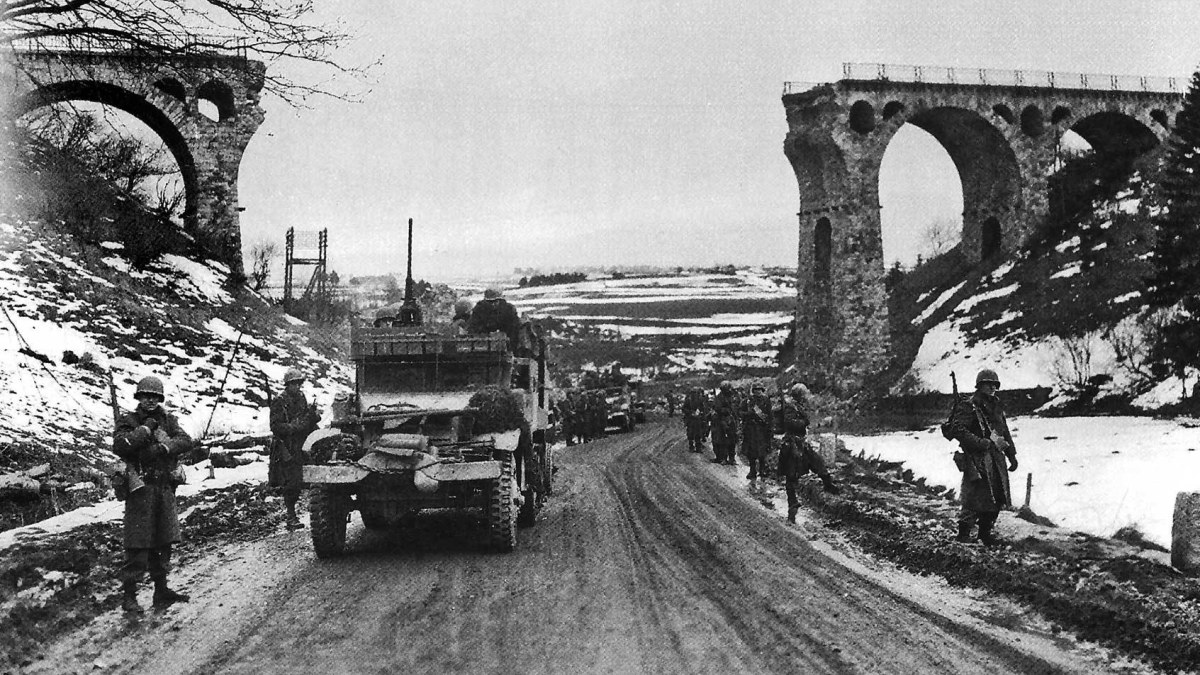
26th Infantry Regiment near Bütgenbach

In the early morning of December 20, 1944, 20 German tanks and troops of the 12th SS Panzer Division and most of a regiment of the 12th Volks Grenadier Division attacked Dom Bütgenbach. Artillery and fire from the foxhole line stopped all but a few tanks. Although suffering casualties, the antitank gun crews destroyed two tanks and drove off others. (Note: Corporal Henry F. Warner destroyed two tanks and drove another away by killing its commander with a pistol shot. On December 1, Warner destroyed another tank but was killed by machine gun fire in the process. He received the Medal of Honor posthumously. Wheeler, 2007, p. 356.) Later in the day, the 2nd Battalion repelled attacks by German infantry unaccompanied by tanks.

On December 21, 1944, Seitz sent Company C of CT 26 to Lieutenant Colonel Daniel so Daniel could reinforce Company E as German tanks threatened Daniel's command post at Dom Bütgenbach. After two German tanks were knocked out near Daniel's headquarters, the Germans briefly pulled back with a third tank that escaped destruction. During this lull, Seitz sent three antitank guns and mines to Dom Bütgenbach and requested engineer help to lay the mines but Companies E and F had to drive off three more attacks before this help arrived. Later in the day Daniel's men had to beat back one more German attack by six tanks and a battalion of Panzergrenadiers. Meanwhile, Company G had to drive off persistent tank and infantry attacks by the German 3rd Parachute Division. By the afternoon of December 21, Daniel was considering shortening his battalion's lines due to rising combat casualties but Seitz secured reinforcements from the 2nd Battalion, 18th Infantry Regiment from Brigadier General Andrus. Using the reinforcements to fill the gap, Seitz shortened his 1st Battalion's front and sent a platoon from the 3rd Battalion to join Daniel. Ten U.S. artillery battalions also were marshaled to hold back the German infantry attacks.

On December 22, 1944, Brigadier General Andrus sent the 1st Battalion, 18th Infantry Regiment to help CT 26 retake part of Bütgenbach that the Germans had entered but CT 26 drove off the Germans before the 18th Infantry Regiment's 1st Battalion arrived, with both sides taking heavy losses. Seitz shifted local reserves to stop the assaults on December 22. That night the 1st Battalion, 18th Infantry Regiment took over the lines south of Bütgenbach from the 1st Battalion, 26th Infantry Regiment, permitting the 26th's 1st Battalion to move closer to the regiment's 2nd Battalion. Also on December 22, the 613th Tank Destroyer Battalion joined the 1st Infantry Division defenders at Bütgenbach.

On December 23 and 24, 1944, 602 replacement soldiers brought the 26th Infantry Regiment, which had sustained casualties of about 25 per cent, up to 2,950 officers and men, close to a full complement. The V Corps, reinforced by the 1st Infantry Division, had held off the German Sixth Panzer Army and prevented them from reinforcing and supplying other German units to the north and west. By December 23, with five German divisions having been wrecked in their attacks at and near Bütgenbach, the Germans turned their main effort to the south where they were held off at Bastogne by the 101st Airborne Division.

Historian James Scott Wheeler described the results at Dom Bütgenbach as "nearly miraculous." Steven Weingartner (ed.) and Paul F. Gorman concluded: "Colonel Seitz's juggling of his tanks, tank destroyers and antitank guns was masterly, the performance of the crews manning these guns doggedly heroic. Moreover, the strength of the fortifications on CT 26's main line of resistance, and the fortitude of its riflemen and machine gunners in manning firing ports after getting overrun by tanks, were also decisive in the battle's outcome."

=== Breaking the Westwall ===
CT 26 was left to hold the ridge between Büllingen and Dom Bütgenbach during bitterly cold and snowy weather until the middle of January, suffering hundreds of cold weather injuries such as frostbite as a result. On January 14, 1945, Major General Huebner ordered the 1st Infantry Division, augmented by CT 23, to lead a drive to break the Westwall. CT 26 held their position while CT 16, CT 18 and CT 23 cleared German units still positioned in Belgium to the south and east. On January 24, 1945, in bitter cold and snow, the 1st Battalion, 26th Infantry Regiment captured Morscheck crossroads between Moderscheid and Büllingen, enabling the division to swing to the east.

On January 28, 1945, the 1st Infantry Division was temporarily assigned to the 18th Airborne Corps. CT 26 on the north and CT 18 to the south were in position to drive through the Rocherrath Forest to Hollerath, Germany and Ramschied, Germany and Udenbreth, Germany respectively. Seitz ordered the 3rd Battalion, 26th Infantry Regiment along with tanks from the 745th Tank Battalion to attack Büllingen which they cleared of German forces by mid-morning. Seitz then sent the 2nd Battalion, 26th Infantry Regiment to clear the woods between Büllingen and Mürringen. During the next morning, he ordered the 1st and 2nd Battalions, 26th Infantry Regiment to attack Mürringen, which was cleared by 10:00 a.m. In a night attack on January 31, the 2nd Battalion of CT 26 cleared the woods between the positions of CT 26 and CT 18. By the evening of January 31, the V Corps and XVIII Airborne Corps reached the Westwall.

On February 1, 1945, the 1st Battalion, 26th Infantry Regiment advanced to within 0.25 miles (0.40 km) of Hollerath before being forced back by heavy resistance. Seitz then spent 36 hours preparing for another attack which was to be supported by heavy artillery, flamethrowers and engineers with demolition charges and bangalore torpedoes to be used against pillboxes. CT 18 and CT 26 were ordered to clear the woods of snipers and German patrols. While CT 18 took Ramscheid on February 3, CT 26 broke the pillbox line by 2:30 p.m. and took Hollerath. Brigadier General Andrus sent word to the two combat teams to be prepared to be relieved within 48 hours.

=== Crossing the Rhine at Remagen ===
By February 10, 1945, the 1st Infantry Division had been relieved by the 99th Infantry Division. After a few days rest, the 1st Infantry Division moved to join the 8th Infantry Division (United States) to the north near Kleinau, Germany, along the Roer River as the weather changed from snow to cold rain. On February 12, 1945, the 1st Infantry Division was assigned to the III Corps (United States) for the push across the Rhine. Six divisions of the 9th U.S. Army had to wait for floodwaters from destroyed dams to recede before crossing the Roer on February 23. The Germans did not attack the bridgeheads and the American engineers were able to build foot and vehicle bridges. First U.S. Army divisions, including the 1st Infantry Division, crossed the Roer on the new bridges on February 25. On February 26, CT 26 crossed the Roer.

By March 1, 1945, the 1st Infantry Division had reached the Neffel River. CT 18 and CT 26 forced crossings of the Neffel and reached the Erft Canal by March 4. On March 8, CT 16 and CT 18 captured Bonn while CT 26 and the 18th Cavalry Group secured the left bank of the Rhine north of Bonn. Meanwhile, on March 7, a task force of CCB, 9th Armored Division, captured the Ludendorff Bridge over the Rhine at Remagen, Germany after the German guards exploded charges on the bridge which failed to destroy it. On March 8, the 1st Infantry Division again was assigned to VII Corps and crossed the Rhine on bridges and ferries at the Remagen bridgehead. On March 17, CT 18 and CT 26 seized high ground to the northeast near Orscheid and Grafenhoven. The 1st Infantry Division, 78th Infantry Division and 104th Infantry Division then advanced about 1 kilometre (0.62 mi) per day, stopping weak German counterattacks on March 23 and March 24.

=== The Ruhr Pocket ===
The 1st Infantry Division organized its three regimental combat teams for the drive to surround the Ruhr region of Germany beginning on March 25, 1945. CT 16 and CT 18 advanced to establish the line of departure, which was secured when CT 18 and the 3rd Battalion, 26th Infantry Regiment captured Ukerath, opening the way for the 3rd Armored Division to advance 12 miles (19 km) the first day. By March 31, the 9th U.S. Army and 1st U.S. Army had closed the Ruhr pocket. The 1st Infantry Division then moved to the Weser River by April 8. On April 9, Colonel Seitz was relieved of command of CT 26 by Lieutenant Colonel Frank Murdoch so Seitz could move to the 69th Infantry Division as assistant commander.

=== Assistant Division Command ===
On April 9, 1945, Seitz was appointed to a brigadier general's position as assistant division commander of the 69th Infantry Division. As the war in Europe neared its close, the 69th Infantry Division met the Soviet Union's 5th Guards Army at the Elbe River in Germany on April 25, 1945. Due to the end of the war in Europe on May 8, 1945, the freeze of promotions, the subsequent reduction in the size of the U.S. Army and the return of Regular Army officers to their previous Regular Army grades, Seitz did not receive promotion to the grade of brigadier general until his subsequent service in the Korean War in 1953.

== Postwar assignments ==
After World War II, Seitz was a student at the first post-war long course at the United States Army Command and General Staff College at Fort Leavenworth, Kansas. Then, he was on the staff of the United States Army Infantry School at Fort Benning, Georgia. Subsequently, he was a student at the Army Industrial College at Fort McNair in Washington, D.C. Then, he was chief of plans at the headquarters of the 1st U.S. Army at Fort Jay on Governors Island, New York.

In 1950, Seitz returned to Germany for another tour as commander of the 26th Infantry Regiment on occupation duty. Because his wife, Helen, was stricken with cancer, Seitz and his family were returned to the United States where Seitz was stationed at Fort Meade, Maryland. Helen Seitz died in January 1953. In June 1953, Seitz was promoted to brigadier general.

== Korean War and aftermath ==
After his promotion to brigadier general, Seitz was sent to Korea where he was Assistant Division Commander of the 45th Infantry Division during the final weeks of the Korean War. At the end of the war, Seitz briefly continued in this position while the 45th Infantry Division patrolled the Demilitarized Zone.

After the Korean Armistice Agreement was signed on July 27, 1953, the 2nd Infantry Division (United States) withdrew to positions south of the Demilitarized Zone. Soon after the armistice, 8th United States Army commander, General Maxwell D. Taylor, appointed Seitz as Commander of the 2nd Infantry Division. Seitz performed this duty during a tense period following the armistice when both vigilance and intensive training of the Republic of Korea Army was required.

On August 20, 1954, the 2nd Infantry Division was notified to prepare for redeployment to the United States. Upon his return to the United States, Seitz was promoted to major general. He then served as Commander of Camp Kilmer, New Jersey and Chief of the New Jersey Military District from 1954 to 1956.

== Military Assistance Advisory Group, Iran ==
Seitz was appointed Chief of the Military Assistance Advisory Group, Iran, from 1956 to 1958. In a document declassified in 2015, Seitz stated at a military advisers' meeting in Karachi, Pakistan, that he was embarrassed by the slowness with which military aid was being sent to Iran. Seitz recounted complaints about inadequate funding, delayed delivery of airplanes, delayed construction projects and conflicting orders. Seitz also said that the Shah's inclination to micromanage projects and Iran's poor economy also were problems. United States support for Iran was increased in subsequent years. These points, with more detail, were contained in a Memorandum for the Record prepared by Major General Seitz, dated Tehran, January 3, 1957. The memorandum summarizes a two and one-half hour meeting that Seitz had with Mohammad Reza Pahlavi, the Shah of Iran.

== Chief of Staff: First U.S. Army; NATO Forces Southern Europe ==
Following his service in Iran, Seitz was Chief of Staff of the First United States Army at Fort Jay on Governors Island, New York 1958–1961. After this assignment, he was Chief of Staff of the North Atlantic Treaty Organization (NATO) (Allied Forces, Southern Europe) 1962–1964.

== Deputy Commander, First U.S. Army ==
Major General Seitz's final assignment was as Deputy Commander, 1st United States Army.

As acting commander of the 1st United States Army, Major General Seitz was escort commander in New York City for the state funeral and transportation for burial of former President of the United States Herbert Hoover, who had died at the Waldorf Astoria Hotel in New York City on October 20, 1964. On October 23, 1964, Hoover's casket was brought from St. Bartholomew's Episcopal Church in New York City, where a funeral service had been held the previous day, to the motorcade where the family and military escort led by Seitz were waiting to transport Hoover's body to Pennsylvania Station for the trip to Washington, D.C., for further ceremonies. Seitz and his staff stood with the Hoover family as the casket was placed on the funeral car. The family then boarded the train for the trip to Washington. (Note: Major General Philip C. Wehle was the escort commander in Washington, D.C. Mossman, 1971, p. 266.)

Major General John F. R. "Jeff" Seitz retired from the United States Army in April 1966.

== Awards ==
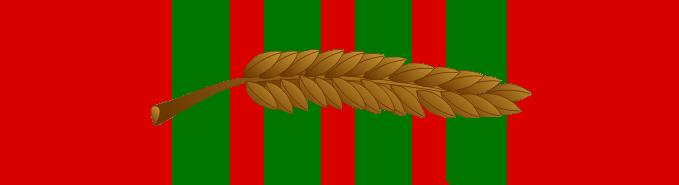
Distinguished Service Medal (2); with Oak Leaf Cluster
Legion of Merit
Silver Star Medal (2); with Oak Leaf Cluster
Bronze Star Medal (3); with Oak Leaf Clusters
Presidential Unit Citation Streamer embroidered STOLBERG.
American Defense Service Medal
American Campaign Medal
European-African-Middle Eastern Campaign Medal
World War II Victory Medal
French Legion of Honour
Croix de guerre 1939–1945 (France), Streamer embroidered NORMANDY
Order of Leopold (Belgium) officer
Croix de guerre (Belgium) with palm
Order of Abdon Calderón (Ecuador)
Army of Occupation of Germany Medal
Korean War Service Medal
National Defense Service Medal

- French Médaille militaire, Fourragère, cord device
- Belgian Fourragère, 1940, cord device

== Personal life ==
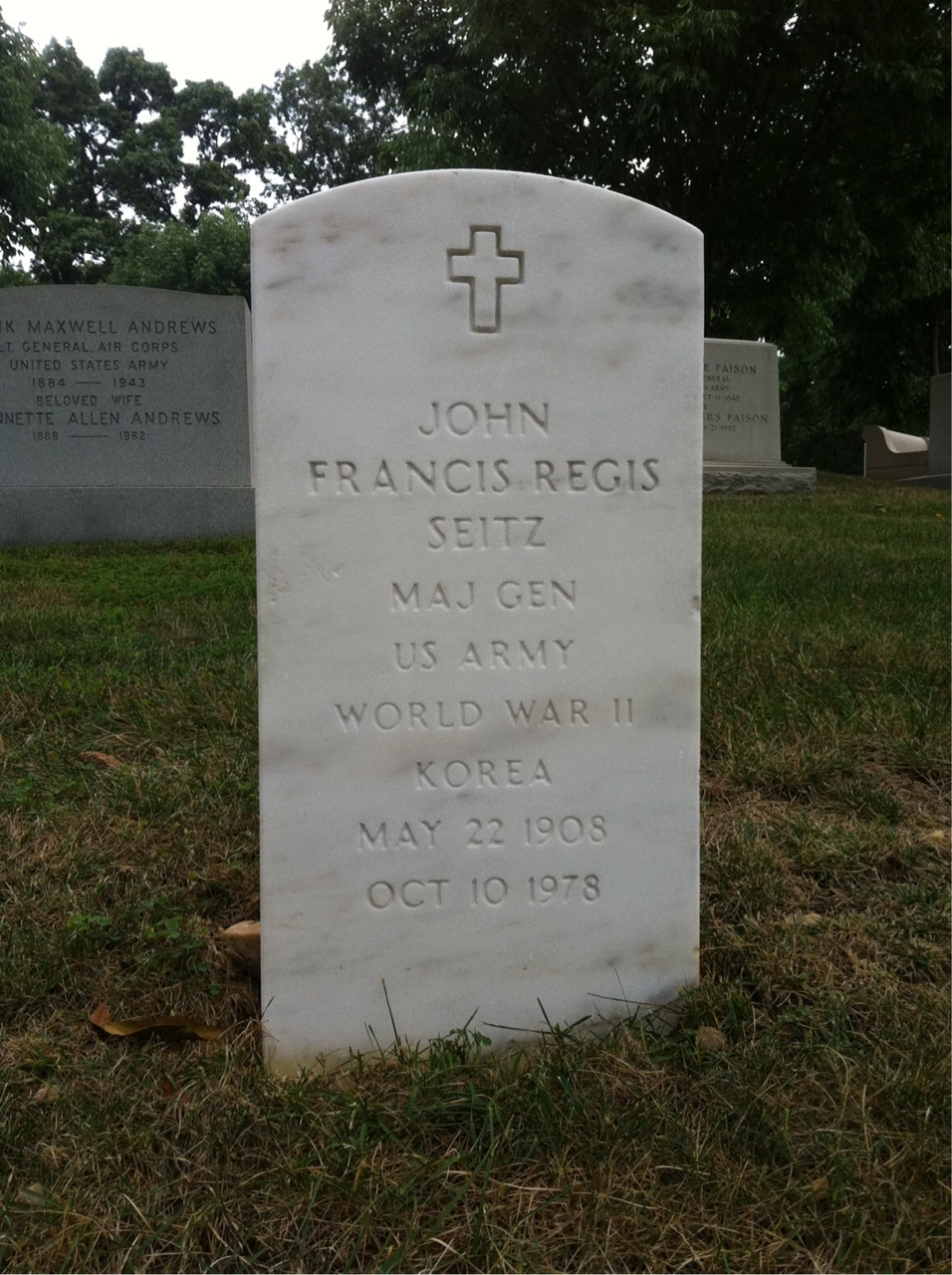
Seitz's grave at Arlington National Cemetery

Jeff Seitz married Helen Hardenbergh in 1931. They had three children, John Francis Regis Seitz Jr., Helen Seitz Patterson and Raymond G. H. Seitz, U.S. Ambassador to the United Kingdom between April 25, 1991, and May 10, 1994. Helen Hardenbergh Seitz died from cancer in January 1953. In 1956, Seitz married the American actress Jessie Royce Landis (called "Royce" by the family; "Roycie" by grandchildren) in Tehran, Iran. After Seitz's retirement in 1966, he and Royce had an apartment in New York City and a home in Ridgefield, Connecticut. Early in 1972, Royce also died from cancer. Later that year, Seitz suffered a stroke after which he required nursing home care for the rest of his life.

Major General John F. R. "Jeff" Seitz died in Washington, D.C., on October 10, 1978. He is buried in Arlington National Cemetery. In his memorial article for Seitz, Brigadier General William D. Thompson wrote that "as an officer he had outstanding ability; he was a superior staff officer and trainer, a brilliant commander and troop leader." Thompson concluded that he had been told that "as a colonel commanding and leading an infantry regiment in combat, he [Seitz] could convince the lowliest, trembling private in the most miserably exposed foxhole that the success of his own squad and of the regiment's mission – and indeed the entire course of the war – depended on how well that private fought in the next hour or so."

== Bibliography ==
- Astor, Gerald (2000). The Bloody Forest: Battle for the Huertgen, September 1944-January 1945. Presidio Press. ISBN 978-0891416999. Archived from the original on October 11, 2016 – via Questia.
- Blennemann, Dirk (2000). Hitler's Army: The Evolution and Structure of German Forces. Combined Publishing. ISBN 978-1580970228. Archived from the original on October 11, 2016 – via Questia.
- Burleson, III, Major Willard M. Mission Analysis During Future Military Operations on Urbanized Terrain. Thesis. U.S. Army Command and General Staff College: Fort Leavenworth, KS: 2000. Originally submitted 1988. OCLC 946633224.
- Cole, Hugh M. The Ardennes: Battle of the Bulge. Washington D.C.: Office of the Chief of Military History, Department of the Army, 1965. OCLC 1253754.
- Coles, Harry L. and Albert K. Weinberg. United States Army in World War II Special Studies. Volume 6. "Civil affairs: Soldiers become governors". Washington, DC: Office of the Chief of Military History, Department of the Army, 1964. OCLC 14649779.
- Greenwood, John T.; Smith, Francis G. Jr.; Sylvan, William C. (2008). Normandy to Victory: The War Diary of General Courtney H. Hodges and the First U.S. Army. University Press of Kentucky. ISBN 978-0813125251. Archived from the original on October 11, 2016 – via Questia.
- Gott, Kendall D. Breaking the Mold: Tanks in the Cities. Fort Leavenworth, KS: Combat Studies Institute Press, 2006. ISBN 978-0160762239.
- Harrison, Gordon A. Cross-Channel Attack. Washington, DC: Center of Military History, United States Army, 1993. OCLC 41111974, Originally published 1951.
- MacDonald, Charles B. The Battle of the Huertgen Forest. Philadelphia: University of Pennsylvania Press, 2003. Originally published; Philadelphia, Lippincott, 1963. ISBN 978-0812218312.
- MacDonald, Charles B. The Siegfried Line Campaign. Washington, D.C.: Center Of Military History, United States Army, 1990. Originally published 1963. OCLC 455971877.
- Mason, Stanhope Brasfield, Derrill M. Daniel, John T. Corley, Charles B. MacDonald and Reports of Office of the AcofS G-2, First United States Infantry Division. Aachen: Military Operations in Urban Terrain, 26th Infantry Regimental Combat Team, 8–20 October 1944. Lititz, PA: 26th Infantry Regimental Association, 4th edition, 1999. OCLC 69242967. p. 3. Retrieved August 27, 2016.
- Miller, Edward G. Dark and Bloody Ground: The Hürtgen Forest and the Roer River Dams, 1944–1945. College Station, TX: Texas A & M University Press, 1995. ISBN 978-1585442584.
- Mossman, B. C. and M. W. Stark. Civil and Military Funerals, 1921–1969. Washington DC: Department of the Army, 1971. OCLC 123268063. Retrieved August 21, 2016. p. 263.
- Price, III, Robert E. and Staff Group. CSI Battlebook: Battle of Aachen. Fort Leavenworth, KS: Combat Studies Institute, 1984. OCLC 13723855.
- Second Indianhead Division Association. "Second Infantry Division". Second Indianhead Division Association web site. History page. Retrieved August 9, 2016.
- Seitz, J. F. R. v12/d376 United States Department of State Office of the Historian Foreign Relations of the United States, 1955–1957, Near East Region; Iran; Iraq, Volume XII. p. 376. Memorandum for the Record by the Chief of the Military Advisory Assistance Group in Iran (Seitz). Retrieved September 18, 2016.
- Thompson, William J. "John F. Seitz" in Assembly (West Point, NY). Volume 38 No. 2. September 1979. Retrieved July 26, 2016.
- United States Army. Order of Battle of The United States Army World War II, European Theater of Operations, 1st Infantry Division (ETO-OB). December 1945. Retrieved October 5, 2016.
- Weingartner, Steven, ed. Gorman, Paul F. Blue Spaders: The 26th Infantry Regiment, 1917–1967. Wheaton, IL: Cantigny First Division Foundation, 1996. ISBN 978-1890093006.
- Wheeler, James Scott. The Big Red One: America's Legendary 1st Infantry Division from World War I to Desert Storm. Lawrence, KS: University of Kansas Press, 2007. ISBN 978-0700615520.
- Wijers, Hans. The Battle of the Bulge: Hell at Bütgenbach/Seize the Bridges. Mechanicsburg, PA: Stackpole Books, 2010. ISBN 978-0811735872.
- Wilson, John B., Armies, Corps, Divisions, and Separate Brigades. Washington, D.C.: Department of the Army, 1999. ISBN 978-0160499944.

Military offices
Preceded by William L. Barriger	Commanding General 2nd Infantry Division; March−August 1954	Succeeded by Robert L. Howze Jr.
