= John Corley =

John Corley may refer to:

- John Thomas Corley, U.S. Army general
- John D. W. Corley (born 1951), United States Air Force general
