= 12th Infantry Division (Wehrmacht) =

12th Infantry Division 12th Volksgrenadier Division
- 12. Infanterie-Division; 12. Volksgrenadier-Division
- Unit insignia
- Active: 1 October 1934 – July 1944; September 1944 – 18 April 1945
- Country: Nazi Germany
- Branch: German Army
- Type: Infantry
- Size: Division
- Garrison/HQ: Wehrkreis II: Schwerin
- Engagements: World War II

The 12th Infantry Division (German: "12. Infanteriedivision") – later known as the 12th Volksgrenadier Division – was a Wehrmacht military unit of Nazi Germany that fought during World War II. The division was formed in 1934. It participated in the invasion of Poland in 1939 and the 1940 campaign in France and the Low Countries. In the Soviet Union, the division joined Operation Barbarossa. The division was destroyed in the Soviet Operation Bagration in the summer of 1944. The division was re-activated in September 1944 and posted to the newly created Western Front.

== History and organisation ==
=== Formation ===
The division was formed in 1934 from Pomerania's Mecklenburger population, with its home station being in Schwerin. In order to hide Germany's remilitarisation – a breaking of the terms of the Treaty of Versailles – the unit was codenamed Infanterieführer II to disguise its size. It did not assume its bona-fide designation until the creation of the Wehrmacht was announced in October 1935, where it was redesignated as the 12th Infantry Division. Alongside the name change, Lieutenant General Wilhelm Ulex was placed in charge of the division, before being replaced by Major General Albrecht Schubert the following October. Schubert was promoted to Lieutenant General in March 1938. In November, the command over the 89th Infantry Regiment's 1st Battalion was given to Helmuth Beukemann. In July 1939, the division was moved to Königsberg, East Prussia as Germany prepared for the upcoming invasion of Poland, ordered into the 1st Army's I Army Corps.

=== Actions 1939–41 ===
The 12th Infantry took part in the invasion of Poland.

During the 1940 assault on France and the Low Countries, the division helped beat back an Anglo-French assault on an associated Panzer column in the hopes of relieving troops besieged in Belgium during their full-on retreat. Following the campaign, the division remained stationed in the region until May 1941 in an occupational capacity, when it was ordered to return to East Prussia.

=== Actions in the Soviet Union ===
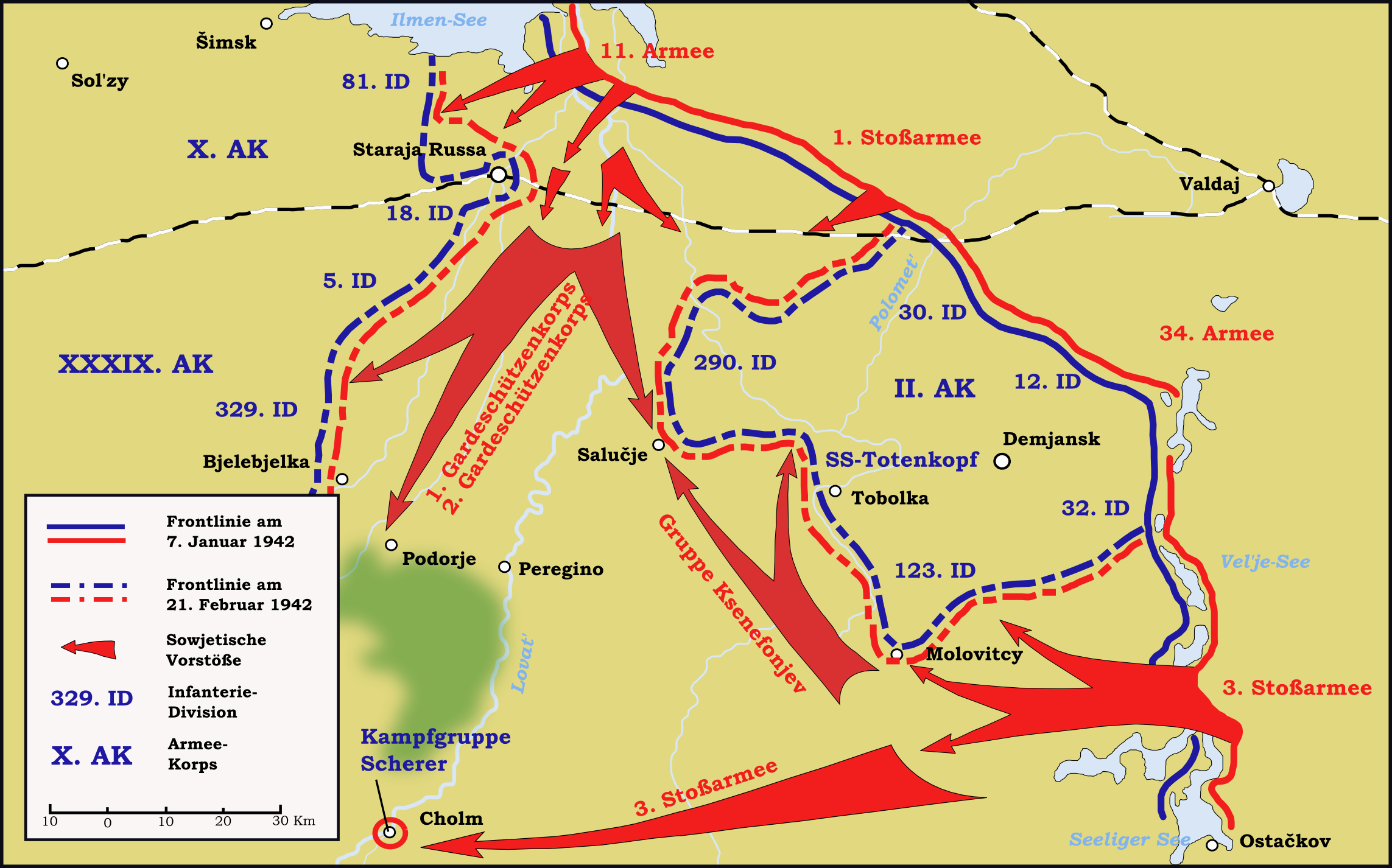
Offensive of the Red Army south of Lake Ilmen 7 January–21 February 1942.

In June 1941 the division joined Operation Barbarossa under Army Group North as an element of the 16th Army. It took part in Army Group North's capture of the Latvian city of Daugavpils, sweeping north-eastward to Leningrad where it was finally stopped in its tracks during the siege effort. During the early months of 1942, the II Army Corps was subject to a Soviet counteroffensive to relieve Leningrad, resulting in five army divisions (the 12th, included) and the SS-Totenkopf division being encircled along with several other elements of the 16th Army in the Demyansk Pocket. With support from Hermann Göring, planes containing supplies were flown in to aid the divisions while they were in the pocket for some 81 days between 8 February and 20 March. Göring would later gloat about his success in freeing the pocket during the Battle of Stalingrad later that year when a similar airlift concept was applied. While liberated, the 12th Infantry had left the pocket in a much-weakened state.

In 1943, with the German Army on the retreat, the division fought in the Belarusian city of Vitebsk. This resulting deterioration of effectiveness led to its capitulation during the Soviets' Summer Offensive in June 1944, soon after Army Group Centre's collapse in Operation Bagration. Some of the division's men escaped capture; its commanding officer Lieutenant General Rudolf Bamler, who had been in command for only a few weeks, was also captured, but later chose to work for the Soviets. Two groups were able to break out and return to German lines before the destruction of the division. Remnants of the Grenadier Regiment 48 commanded by Hauptmann Siegfried Moldenhauser would escape through a corridor east and evade Soviet forces until they reached Polykowischi where Major Osterhold formed a Kampfgruppe which broke out to German lines west. The second group, 1st Battalion, Fusilier Regiment 27. commanded by Major Heinz-Georg Lemm would break through Russian lines 3 kilometers west of Mogilev and from there they would move north of Berezino where they would cross the Berezina river.

=== Re-activation ===
The division was re-activated in September 1944, where it was sent to the newly created Western Front. Again placed under the command of Colonel Gerhard Engel, the division – at some point being redesignated the "12th Volksgrenadier Division" (German: 12. Volksgrenadier-division) – was at a strength of some 12,800 men. With Allied forces approaching the Siegfried Line, the division was made a line division against the Siegfried Line near Aachen. On September 15, elements of the division arrived at the command post of LXXXI Corps where; in the evening they were given orders by the 7th Army to continue the defence of Aachen and to launch a counterattack on the building Allied forces crossing the Ruhr, by first staging near Eschweiler. The following day, elements of the 9th Panzer Division were added to the 12th Volksgrenadier, which was now well-equipped – at least in comparison to other, starving divisions. It then proceeded to take command of the immediate area around Düren. A meeting between chiefs of staff of the 12th Volksgrenadier and the 9th Panzer Divisions took place on the evening to decide on how to plan their joint-attack on the river Mausbach set for the following day.

The division continued to see action on the Western Front in the Ardennes as part of the 6th Panzer Army's I SS-Panzer Corps during the Battle of the Bulge. On January 1, Lieutenant General Engel was seriously wounded by Allied forces, and Colonel Rudolf Langhaeuser assumed temporary command until Engel's return in February. When the offensive failed, the 6th Panzer Army left for Hungary, leaving the division behind to fight off the approaching Americans. The division was encircled near Wuppertal with Army Group B within the Ruhr Pocket. On April 12, Major General Koenig assumed command of the division, having also assumed command of the 272nd Volksgrenadier Division. As the Pocket collapsed, Koenig was captured at Wuppertal on April 18.

== Commanders ==
- Lieutenant General Walther von Seydlitz-Kurzbach (10 March 1940)
- Lieutenant General Kurt-Jürgen Freiherr von Lützow (1 March 1942)
- Lieutenant General Curt Jahn (25 May 1944)
- Lieutenant General Rudolf Bamler (4 June 1944)
- Major General Gerhard Engel (28 June 1944 – January 1, 1945)

== Unit components ==
- 27th Fusilier Regiment
- 48th Infantry Regiment
- 89th Infantry Regiment
- 12th Artillery Regiment
- 12th Reconnaissance Battalion
- 12th Anti-Tank Battalion
- 12th Engineer Battalion
- 12th Signal Battalion
- 12th Field Replacement Battalion
- 12th Divisional Supply Troops
