= McCurley =

McCurley is a surname. Notable people with the surname include:

- Anna McCurley (born 1943), Scottish politician
- Kevin McCurley (footballer) (1926–2000), English footballer
- Kevin McCurley (cryptographer), American mathematician and computer scientist
- Scott McCurley, American football player and coach
- Shannon McCurley (born 1992), Australian-born Irish cyclist

== See also ==
- Curley
