= Kinlichee, Arizona =

Kinlichee, Arizona Kin Dah Łichííʼ (Navajo)
- Populated place
- Location within the state of Arizona Kinlichee (the United States)
- Coordinates: 35°45′22″N 109°25′32″W
- Country: United States
- State: Arizona
- County: Apache
- Elevation: 6,660 ft (2,030 m)
- Time zone: UTC-7 (Mountain (MST))
  - Summer (DST): UTC-7 (MST)
- Area code: 928
- FIPS code: 04-37760
- GNIS feature ID: 25267

Kinlichee (Navajo: Kin Dah Łichííʼ), also known historically as Kin Li Chee, Kin-Li-Chee, or Kin-li-Chee, is a populated place situated in Apache County, Arizona, United States, six miles north-northeast of Ganado. The current name was officially recognized as a result of a decision by the Board on Geographic Names in 1983. It has an estimated elevation of 6,660 feet (2,030 m) above sea level. The name is derived from the Navajo kin dah łichíí’, which means "red house up at an elevation".

The location has a boarding school, Kin Dah Łichí'í Ólta', which opened in its most recent incarnation in 1999.

Kinlichee was home to Nelson J. "Jerome" McCabe, former Chief Justice of the Supreme Court of the Navajo Nation. McCabe died in 2014, and is buried in the Kinlichee Community Cemetery. Craig Curley, a Native American distance runner, was also born in Kinlichee.
