= Curtley (given name) =

Curtley or Curtly is a male given name and may refer to one of the following:

- Curtly Ambrose, Antiguan cricketer
- Curtly Hampton, Australian rules footballer
- Curtley Louw, South African cricketer
- Curtley Williams, English cricketer

== See also ==
- Curley
