= Catherine Corley Anderson =

American writer (1909–2001)

Catherine Corley Anderson (March 21, 1909 – December 12, 2001) was an American writer of children's books.

== Biography ==
Catherine Margaret Corley was born in Chicago, Illinois on March 21, 1909, to Gaynor and Anna (Higgins) Corley. She died on December 12, 2001, in Charlotte, North Carolina. She married Charles Melvin Anderson on January 15, 1930, in Chicago. Catherine was one of four children. Her parents valued education, and she was raised in a household of culture, politics and literature. She graduated from Mercy High School, and earned a bachelor's degree in art education from the Art Institute of Chicago in 1933.

She was hired as an art instructor by the Chicago Park District. She worked at Shedd Park, Dvorak Park, and Palmer Park, where she and her husband Mel met and performed puppet shows with Burr Tillstrom, who went on to be the co-producer of television's Kukla, Fran and Ollie.

In 1945, Corley placed second in the New World Short Story Contest, for her story "Guests in the Monastery", for which she won a $25 war bond. In 1950 she won a second place award at the Midwest Writers Conference for "Nika of Illinois", a story for juveniles about a Native American boy during the time of Father Marquette.

Catherine and Mel founded the Chicago Marionette Company where they worked with high schoolers performing puppet shows. She published numerous poems under the pseudonym "Coralie".

She wrote several children's books, including a series based on a Catholic school sister named Sister Beatrice. Sister Beatrice Goes West and Officer O'Malley on the Job were two of her most popular stories. She also wrote a children's biography of Jacqueline Kennedy Onassis and one about President John F. Kennedy.

== Publications ==
- Busy Bee Fun Books, by Catherine C. Anderson, 1952–53
- Officer O'Malley on the Job, illustrations by Chauncey Maltman, Albert Whitman, 1954
- Sister Beatrice Goes to Bat, Bruce Publishing, 1958
- Sister Beatrice Goes West, self illustrated, Bruce Publishing, 1961
- Sister Beatrice and the Mission Mystery, self-illustrated, Bruce Publishing, 1963
- John F. Kennedy: Young People's President, Lerner Publications Company, 1991
- Jackie Kennedy Onassis: Woman of Courage, Lerner Publications Company, 1995
