= Mausbach =

River in Stolberg, Germany

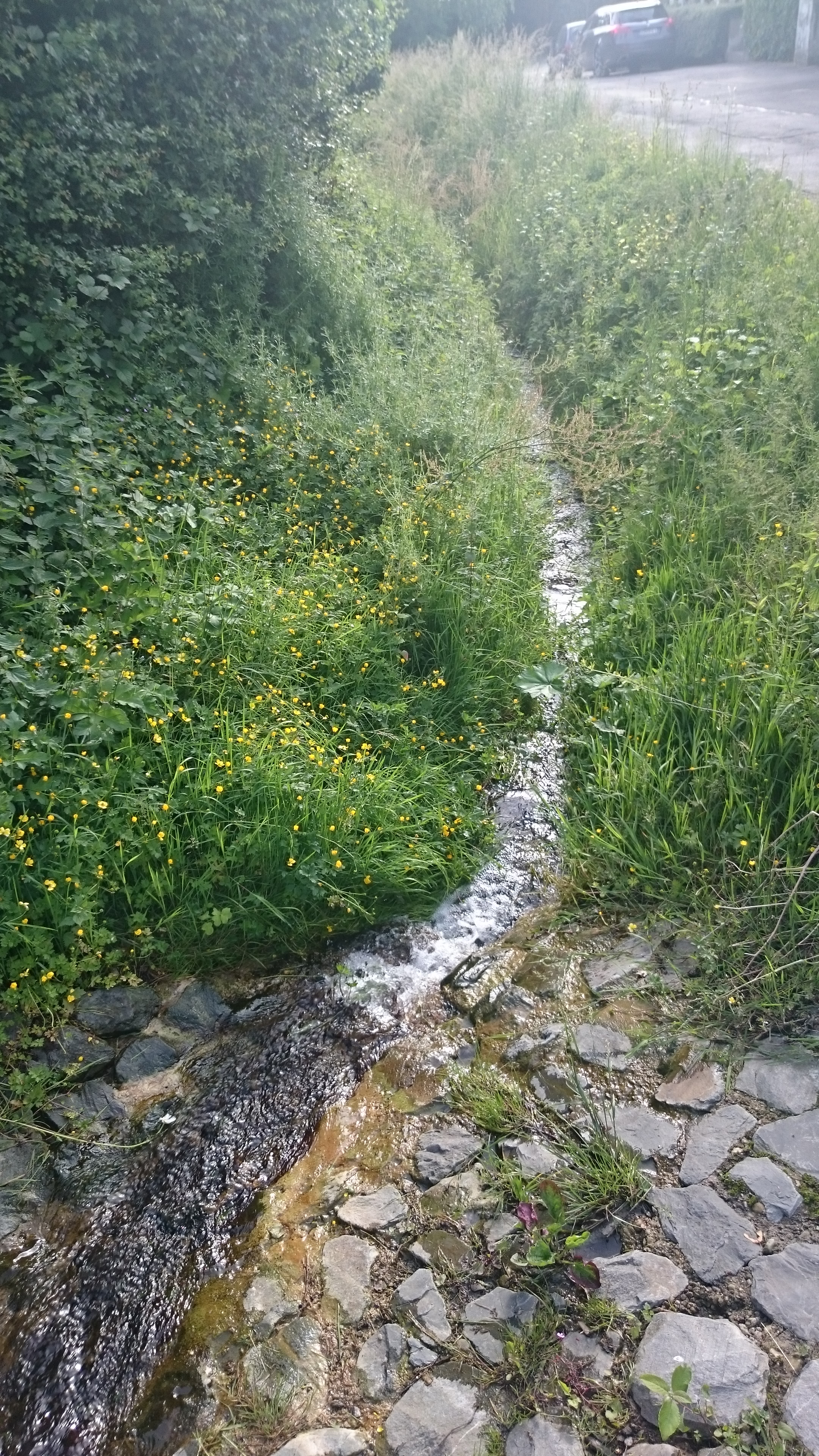

Location
- Country: Germany
- States: North Rhine-Westphalia

Physical characteristics
- Mouth
  - location: Vichtbach
  - coordinates: 50.7489°N 6.2610°E

Basin features
- Progression: Vichtbach→ Inde→ Rur→ Meuse→ North Sea

Mausbach is a small river of North Rhine-Westphalia, Germany. It is 1.2 km long and flows into the Vichtbach as a right tributary near Stolberg. It is one of four streams in North Rhine-Westphalia named Mausbach.

== See also ==
- List of rivers of North Rhine-Westphalia
