= Vichtbach =

River in Germany

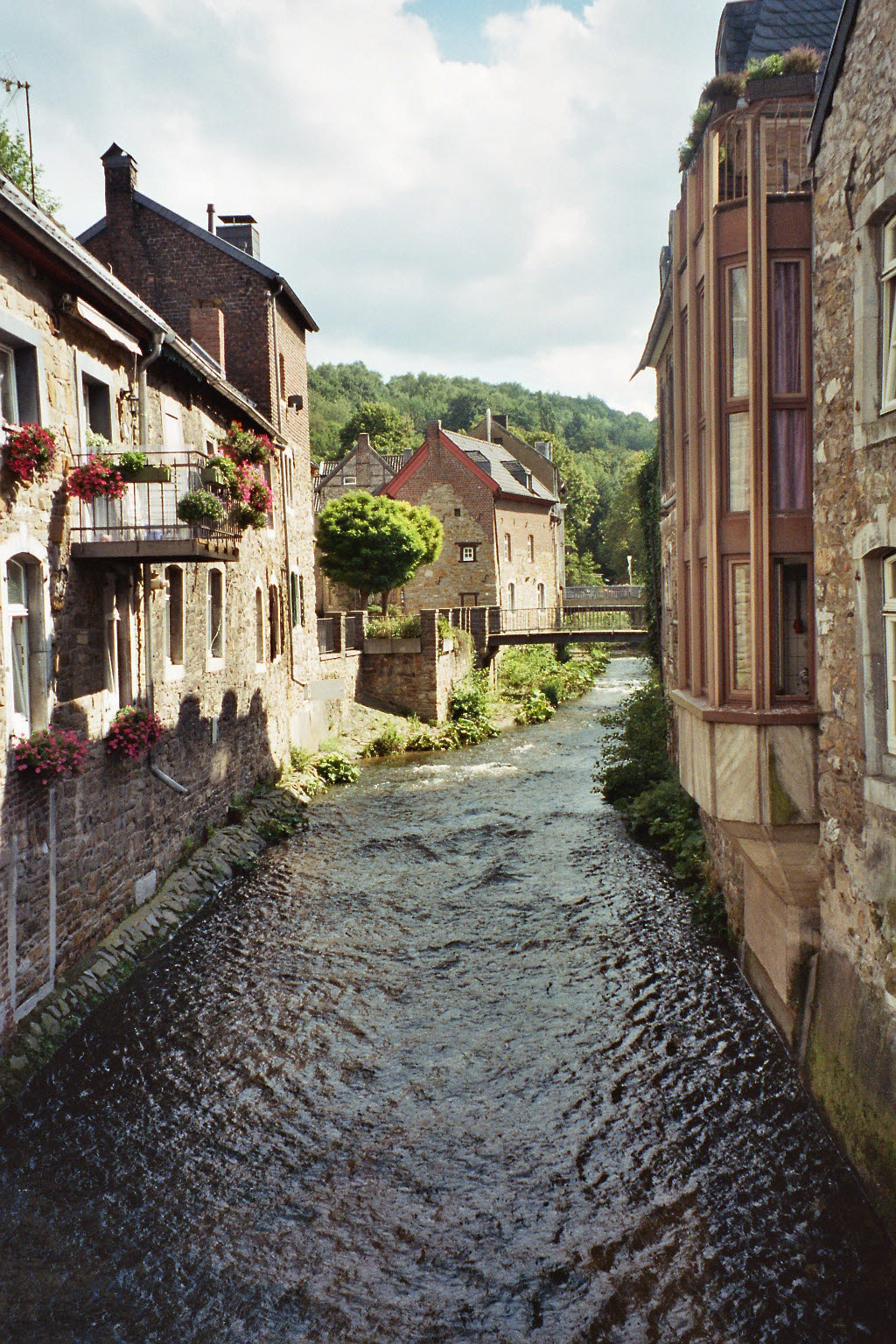
- Vichtbach in Oberstolberg

Location
- Country: Germany
- State: North Rhine-Westphalia

Physical characteristics
- Source
  - location: Roetgen
- Mouth
  - location: Inde
  - coordinates: 50.7905°N 6.2218°E
- Length: 23.0 km (14.3 mi)
- Basin size: 104 km^{2} (40 sq mi)

Basin features
- Progression: Inde→ Rur→ Meuse→ North Sea

Vichtbach is a river of North Rhine-Westphalia, Germany. It flows into the Inde near Stolberg.

== See also ==
- List of rivers of North Rhine-Westphalia
