= Martha A.Q. Curley =

American nurse

- Born: November 14, 1952 (age 73); Springfield, Massachusetts, US
- Spouse: John G. Curley

Academic background
- Education: BSc, 1985, University of Massachusetts Amherst; MSN, 1987, Yale University; PhD, 1997, Boston College
- Thesis: Clinical predictors of progress in weaning pediatric patients with acute respiratory failure from mechanical ventilation (1997)

Academic work
- Institutions: University of Pennsylvania School of Nursing; Children's Hospital of Philadelphia

Martha A.Q. Curley (born November 14, 1952) is an American nurse. She is the Ruth M. Colket Endowed Chair in Pediatric Nursing at Children's Hospital of Philadelphia.

== Early life and education ==
Curley was born on November 14, 1952 in Springfield, Massachusetts.

She completed her Diploma in Nursing from the Springfield Hospital School of Nursing in 1973 and her Bachelor of Science degree at the University of Massachusetts Amherst in 1985. Following this, she completed her Master's degree in nursing from Yale University and her PhD from Boston College.

== Career ==
Upon completing her formal education, Curley joined the faculty at the University of Pennsylvania School of Nursing. As an associate professor received a five-year $10M Research Project Grant Program from the National Heart, Lung, and Blood Institute for a multi-site clinical trial, "Sedation Management in Pediatric Patients with Acute Respiratory Failure Study." In 2010, Curley was honored with the Barbara J. Lowery D.S.O. Faculty Award for advancing nursing science through exemplary student mentorship. As a result of her research, Curley was inducted into the 2014 International Nurse Researcher Hall of Fame.

In 2016, Curley was elected a member of the National Academy of Medicine as someone who "demonstrated outstanding professional achievement and commitment to service." Two years later, he was appointed the Ruth M. Colket Endowed Chair in Pediatric Nursing at Children's Hospital of Philadelphia. During the COVID-19 pandemic, Curley was awarded SCCM's 2021 Drs. Vidyasagar and Nagamani Dharmapuri Award for Excellence in Pediatric Critical Care Medicine as an individual who displayed "sustained exemplary and pioneering achievement in the care of critically ill and injured infants and children."
