= DJ Holographic =

- Born: Ariel Corley; 1989 or 1990 (age 35–36); Detroit
- Genres: disco, house, techno
- Occupations: disc jockey, record producer
- Website: www.djholographic.com

Ariel Corley (born 1989 or 1990), known as DJ Holographic, is a Detroit-born DJ and producer known for blending house, disco, techno, R&B, and Motown influences. She describes herself as a “one-woman funk machine".

In the 2010s and beyond, DJ Holographic built a profile with performances at major clubs and festivals. She has played at venues such as Berlin’s Panorama Bar, London’s Fabric, New York’s Output, and Chicago’s Smart Bar. In late 2019, DJ Holographic played three Miami shows in one month, which included sets at Club Space and Floyd, where she showcased a "grassroots" Detroit sound that bridged house, techno, and disco. DJ Holographic has also performed at festivals such as Movement Detroit and OFFSónar and has also brought techo to Coachella in 2022. In 2020, she released her debut EP Parallel Shifting on her own Hitchhiker label. The next year, she curated Detroit Love Vol. 5 on Carl Craig's Planet E label, featuring her original track “Faith in My Cup”. The album was nominated for a DJ Mag Best of North America award. In 2024, she launched a zodiac-themed single series called House in the Dark, culminating in a full album.

Corley’s style reflects her Detroit roots and influences. She grew up hearing Motown, R&B, and rock, and cites artists like David Bowie and Prince as inspirations.

DJ Holographic is known to be at the forefront of the LGBTQ+ DJing scene.

== Discography ==
=== Singles ===
- "Gemini" (2024)
- "Pisces" (2025)
- "Aries" (2025)

=== Albums ===
- Detroit Love Vol. 5 (2021)
- House In The Dark (2025)
