= Thomas Curley =

Thomas Curley may refer to:

- Thomas Curley (Wisconsin general) (1825–1904), American Civil War general and politician
- Thomas Curley (sound engineer) (born 1976), American production sound mixer
- Tom Curley (born 1948), American journalist
- Tom Curley (footballer), (born 1945), Scottish footballer
