= Craig Curley =

American long-distance runner

Personal information
- Nationality: American
- Born: July 1, 1988 (age 38) Kinlichee, Arizona

Sport
- Sport: Track, long-distance running
- Events: 5000 meters, 10,000 meters, marathon
- College team: Pima Community College

Achievements and titles
- Personal bests: 5000 meters: 14:10.61; 10,000 meters: 29:03.45; Half marathon: 1:03:24; Marathon: 2:15:16

Craig Curley is a Native American distance runner. Born in Kinlichee, Arizona, he grew up in a rural setting on the Navajo reservation. He was the fastest male high school runner in the state of Arizona during the 2005 cross country season. Curley's trajectory took an unusual route, as he declined offers to compete with big Division I schools in favor of Pima Community College, for whom he broke the 5000-meter previously set by former Pima standout Abdihakem Abdirahman. After his two-year spell in community college, Curley transitioned to the marathon.

== Running career ==
=== High school ===
Curley attended St. Michael High School, where he competed in cross country and track under coach Terry Thompson until his graduation in 2006. Curley recorded a first-place finish in Arizona's 2005 1A state cross country championship.

=== Collegiate ===
Despite having success in high school, Curley declined recruiting offers from Arizona State University and University of Arizona. Former distance runner Greg Wenneborg was the distance coach at Pima Community College, a small community college with a track record for excellent distance runners such as Abdihakem Abdirahman. After Curley's first practice with Pima, coach Wenneborg immediately offered him a scholarship, and Curley enrolled in Pima's two-year program. At the 2006 UC San Diego Triton Invitational, Curley set a new Pima record for the 5000 meters at 14:23.26.

=== Post-collegiate ===
Curley qualified for the 2012 US Olympic Trials in Houston, Texas, but his 2:39 marathon debut was considered a disappointment considering his credentials. Although discouraged, he made another appearance at the 2012 Columbus Marathon in Ohio, where he ended up winning the race despite not taking the lead until the last six miles. After his win at Columbus, Curley signed a professional contract with Mizuno.
