= James Curley =

James Curley may refer to:

- James Curley (astronomer) (1796–1889), Irish-American astronomer
- James Curley (Australian politician) (1846–1913), Australian politician
- James Michael Curley (1874–1958), American politician
