= John Thomas Corley =

United States Army general (1914–1977)

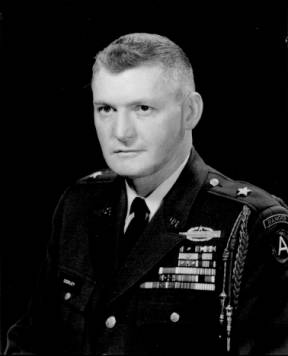
- Born: August 4, 1914; Brooklyn, New York, United States
- Died: April 16, 1977 (aged 62)
- Military career
- Allegiance: United States
- Branch: United States Army
- Service years: 1938–1966
- Rank: Brigadier General
- Service number: 0-21325
- Unit: Infantry Branch
- Commands: 3rd Battalion, 26th Infantry Regiment; 24th Infantry Regiment
- Conflicts: World War II; Korean War
- Awards: Distinguished Service Cross (2); Silver Star (8); Soldier's Medal; Legion of Merit (2); Bronze Star (4); Purple Heart; Combat Infantryman Badge (2); Ranger tab

Brigadier General John Thomas Corley (August 4, 1914 – April 16, 1977) was a career United States Army officer who served with distinction in World War II. He was also noted for his contributions to army training.

== Early life ==
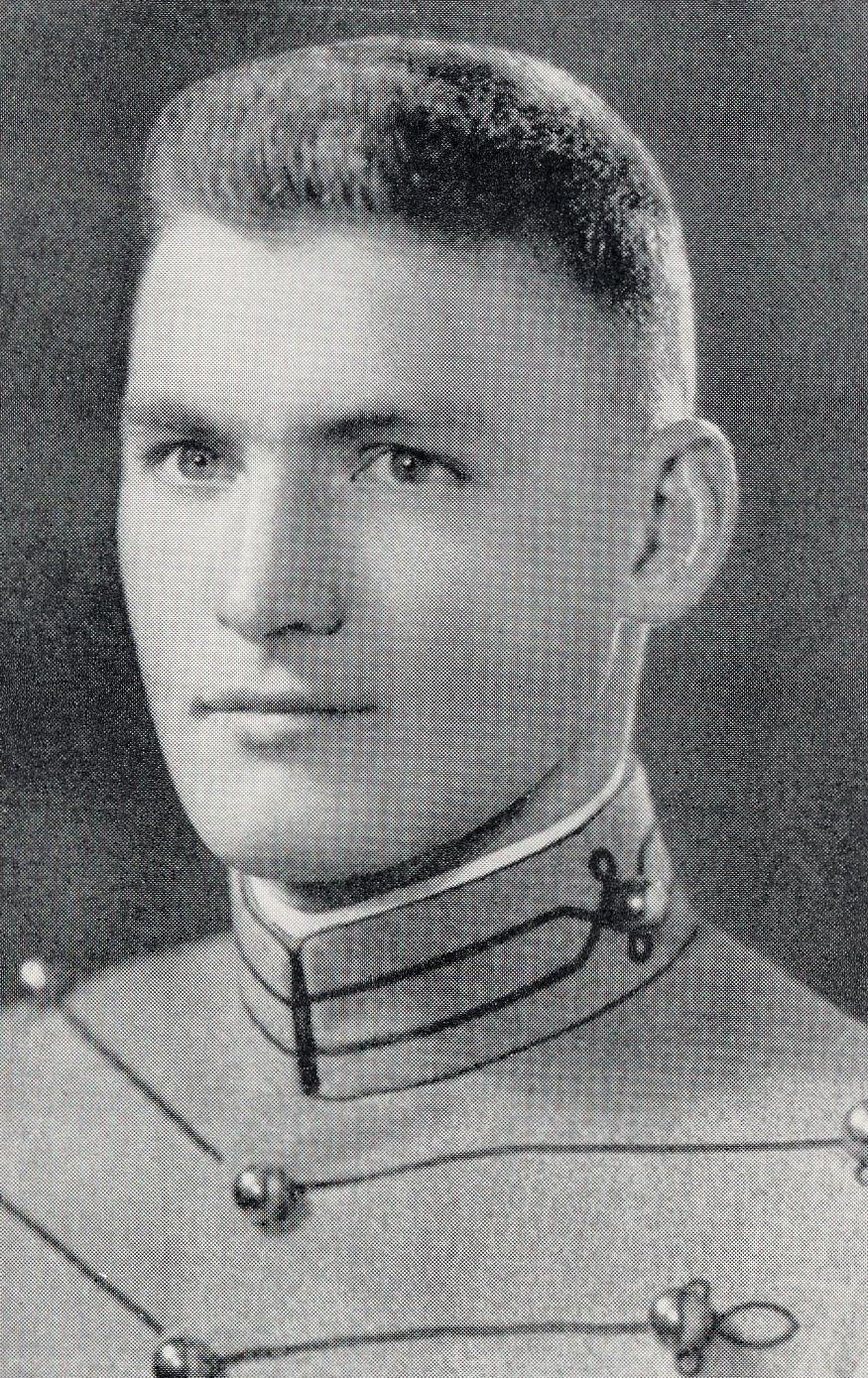
Corley as a United States Military Academy cadet c. 1938

John Thomas Corley was born to Irish immigrant parents (Bridget Beatrice Surdival b. December 31, 1876 in Belcarra, County Mayo and John J. Corley b. 1872 in Castlebar, County Mayo) in Brooklyn, New York, on August 4, 1914, the day World War I began in Europe. He had a twin sister Ellen (August 4, 1914 - October 3, 1919) and a younger brother James (September 18, 1915 - January 4, 1987). He attended high school at St. Francis Preparatory High School, in Brooklyn and graduated from the class of 1932 and he is also a member of that High School's Hall of Fame. He graduated from the United States Military Academy at West Point in 1938, where he also was an accomplished boxer prior to his active duty service. One story states that after his graduation from West Point he was assigned to the Army Air Corps; where he then flew an airplane under the Brooklyn Bridge and was then reassigned to the infantry.

== World War II ==
He fought in World War II with the 1st Infantry Division. As a major, he landed with the Big Red One in North Africa and two days later earned a Silver Star, America's third highest award for valor, for action in Oran, Algeria. Corley earned the first of his eight Silver Stars when he braved heavy small arms fire to scout out observation points for artillery observers. In March 1943, during fighting at El Guettar, Tunisia, a well-entrenched machine gun nest halted the advance of his battalion, Corley crawled to its rear under heavy fire and personally threw the grenade that silenced the gun, allowing his troops to take the hilltop. This action earned Corley the Distinguished Service Cross, America's second highest award for valor. In May 1943, Corley was promoted to lieutenant colonel, just five years after graduating from West Point.

While commanding the 3rd Battalion, 26th Infantry Regiment, in Mateur, Tunisia, Corley was wounded. He recovered and went on to fight at the front in Sicily. As the 1st Division pushed through North Africa and eventually invading Sicily, Corley picked up his second Silver Star in July 1943 when he remained at the front of an assault force to maneuver his men in an attack against heavy resistance when other units had faltered and held back. From November the 26th Infantry Regiment was commanded by Colonel John F. R. Seitz.

He landed at Normandy during D-Day and fought at the Hurtgen Forest during late 1944. He also accepted the first unconditional surrender of a German city during the war, when he accepted the surrender of Aachen by Col. Gerhard Wilck. Corley added four oak leaf clusters to his Silver Star for a total of five Silver Stars in World War II.

After the war, Corley served in a supporting role at the Nuremberg Trials. He then returned to West Point to teach as a tactical officer, followed by staff positions with the 1st Army, and graduated from the Command and General Staff College at Fort Leavenworth.

== Korean War ==
General Corley was one of twenty-one commanders personally requested by General Douglas MacArthur for duty in the Far East shortly after the invasion of South Korea by North Korea.

He served as battalion commander of the 24th Infantry Regiment, 25th Infantry Division, a segregated regiment composed of black enlisted men and mostly white officers. Corley led his troops in close combat and earned an oak leaf cluster for his Distinguished Service Cross and three additional clusters for his Silver Star between August and November 1950. By 10 August 1950, he had earned his sixth Silver Star Medal when he again moved to the front to coordinate the attack under heavy small-arms and mortar fire. When a radio man was injured, he personally administered first aid and carried him back for evacuation. Near Haman, Korea, his battalion was fighting to take hilly and mountainous terrain when it came under a withering North Korean counter-attack. On multiple occasions when his company was beaten back by superior numbers, Corley rushed to the front and personally reorganized the retreating men to halt the enemy advance. Under heavy fire, he personally called for fire missions with brutal accuracy and devastating effect on the enemy. Corley went on to earn two additional Silver Stars in Korea. His later Silver Star citations noted that Corley would only return from the front when the division commander ordered him to do so.

After Korea, Corley served as chief of the Infantry Branch before graduating from Army War College at Carlisle Barracks, Pennsylvania, in 1954. He served with 7th Army in Europe from August 1954 to August 1957, and then served as director of the Infantry School's Infantry School's Ranger Department at Fort Benning, Georgia, from August 1957 to May 1960. He next served as deputy chief of staff, Allied Land Forces, with SHAPE in Denmark from June 1960 to May 1962. Gen Corley became assistant division commander of the 2nd Infantry Division at Fort Benning, Georgia, in June 1962, and he was assigned as chief of staff, 1st Army in New York, in June 1964. His final assignment was as deputy commanding general at the U.S. Army's Infantry Training Center, Fort Jackson, South Carolina, from January 1966 until his retirement from the Army on 30 September 1966.

General Corley died at the age of 62 on 16 April 1977. In 2003, Brigadier General Corley was posthumously inducted into the Ranger Hall of Fame.

== Family ==
He and his wife, Mrs. Mary Buckley Corley, would have 4 sons (John, James, Robert and Michael) and 3 daughters (Mary, Ellen, and Carol). One son, 1LT John Thomas Corley Jr., USMA 1967, would be killed in Vietnam. Two of his children, Michael and Ellen served as officers in the active duty army; both retiring at the rank of Colonel. Two grandsons (MSG Brian Powers and SFC Michael B. Corley) and a grand daughter (PFC Katherine Corley) also currently serve.

== Awards and decorations ==

Brigadier General Corley's individual awards and decorations include two Combat Infantryman Badges, two Army Distinguished Service Crosses, the Army Distinguished Service Medal, eight Silver Stars, four bronze stars, two Legion of Merit medals, the Soldier's Medal, the Purple Heart and the Army Commendation Medal. The American Defense Service Medal, American Campaign Medal, European-African-Middle Eastern Campaign Medal with eight campaign stars and an arrowhead, the World War II Victory Medal, Army of Occupation Medal with "Germany" clasp, two National Defense Service Medals, the Korean Service Medal with two campaign stars, the World War II French Croix De Guerre Medal with silver stars, for those who had been mentioned at the division level, the United Nations Service Medal and the Republic of Korea Korean War Service Medal (Posthumously), and the Ranger Tab. He also has the a Korean Presidential Unit Citation for the defense of the port of Pusan, Korea in 1950.

His 2nd Distinguished Service Cross Citation reads:

The President of the United States takes pleasure in presenting a Bronze Oak Leaf Cluster in lieu of a Second Award of the Distinguished Service Cross to John Thomas Corley (0–21325), Lieutenant Colonel (Infantry), U.S. Army, for extraordinary heroism in connection with military operations against an armed enemy of the United Nations while serving as Commanding Officer of the 3d Battalion, 24th Infantry Regiment, 25th Infantry Division. Lieutenant Colonel Corley distinguished himself by extraordinary heroism in action against enemy aggressor forces near Haman, Korea, during the period 21 through 23 August 1950. Two of Colonel Corley's companies had as their objective the key hill to the regimental sector, Battle Mountain. Company L led off the attack, gained the objective and while attempting to secure the position was driven back by a counterattack. Quickly estimating the situation, Colonel Corley moved from his forward command post under small-arms, machine-gun and mortar fire to a position about two hundred yards from the summit of Battle Mountain to reorganize Company L. He stopped the retreat and reorganized the position. The counterattack was checked, Colonel Corley stayed on this position until the enemy attack had been repelled. He called for artillery fire, but the liaison officer was unable to communicate with his guns. Colonel Corley returned to his command post and obtained communications through Regiment to the guns. He then directed fire on the right flank of Battle Mountain where the enemy was in the process of regrouping. This fire was effective. He then ordered Company L to retake Battle Mountain. Colonel Corley moved from his command post to Company L, where he coordinated small- arms, mortar, and artillery fire. When the attack of Company L was stopped, he directed Company I to move through Company L. Company I gained the approach ridge but later was forced to withdraw. Again Colonel Corley reorganized the men and placed Company I in reserve behind Company L. On 23 August 1950, the companies completed the mission of capturing Battle Mountain. The extraordinary heroism and inspirational leadership displayed by Colonel Corley reflects the highest credit upon himself and the military service.
