= Curlee (name) =

Curlee is a surname or given name. Notable people with this name include the following:

== Surname ==
- Christina "Phazero" Curlee was a video game designer
- Hannah Curlee, runner-up on Season 11 of The Biggest Loser
- Julia Curlee, American intelligence officer
- Nancy Curlee, American soap opera writer

== Given name ==
- Curlee Brown, Sr. (1909–1976), African-American activist
- Curlee Discaya, Filipino businessman involved in the Philippine flood control projects controversy

== See also ==
- Curlee (disambiguation)
- Curler (disambiguation)
- Curlew (disambiguation)
- Curley, name list
- Curly, name list
- Curli, protein
