= Curlew (disambiguation) =

Curlew is the common name for a group of birds of the family Scolopacidae.

Curlew may also refer to:

== Music ==
- The Curlew, song cycle by Peter Warlock written between 1920 and 1922
- Curlew (band), an American jazz group
  - Curlew (album), a 1981 album by Curlew
- Curlew River, a 1964 opera by Benjamin Britten

== Places ==
- Curlew Island (disambiguation)

=== Canada ===
- Curlew, Alberta, a locality in Kneehill County, Alberta

=== United States ===
- Curlew, Iowa, a city in Palo Alto County, Iowa
- Curlew, Kentucky, an unincorporated community in Union County, Kentucky
- Curlew, Washington, an unincorporated community and census-designated place in Ferry County, Washington,

== Ships ==
- Curlew (steamboat), an American steamer completed in 1856 and sunk in 1863
- CSS Curlew, a Confederate States Navy gunboat commissioned in 1861 and burned in 1862
- HMCS Curlew, a Royal Canadian Navy minesweeper and patrol vessel commissioned in 1914 and sold in 1921
- HMS Curlew, various ships of the British Royal Navy
- USFS Curlew, a fishery vessel in the fleet of the United States Bureau of Fisheries
- USS Curlew, various United States Navy ships

== Aircraft ==
- CLW Curlew, a British training aircraft of the 1930s

== See also ==
- Curlee (disambiguation)
- Curler (disambiguation)
- Curley (disambiguation)
