= Culley (surname) =

Culley is a surname. Notable people with the name include:

- Bill Culley (1892–1955), Scottish footballer
- Charles Culley CMG (1877–1949), Australian politician
- David Culley (born 1955), American football coach
- Fiona Culley, British country singer-songwriter
- Frank Culley (1917–1991), American saxophonist and bandleader
- Frederick Culley (1879–1942), British film actor
- George Culley (died 1813), English agriculturist
- Henry Culley, American tennis player
- Julie Culley (born 1981), American track and field athlete
- Karl Culley, English guitarist and singer-songwriter
- Peter Culley (1958 – 2015), Canadian poet
- Thea Culley (born 1986), Canadian field hockey player
- Wendell Culley (1906–1983), American jazz trumpeter

== See also ==
- Culley (given name)
- Culey (disambiguation) § People
- Cully (disambiguation) § Surname
