= Culley =

Culley may refer to:

- Culley (given name), includes a list of people with the given name
- Culley (surname), includes a list of people with the surname
- F. B. Culley Generating Station, a 369-MWe coal-fired electricity-generating power plant southeast of Newburgh in Warrick County

== See also ==
- Culey (disambiguation)
- Cully (disambiguation)
- Curley (disambiguation)
