= Curly (disambiguation) =

Curly is a surname, given name or nickname.

Curly may also refer to:

== Places ==
- Curly, County Tyrone, a townland in County Tyrone, Northern Ireland
- A nickname for Curl Curl, New South Wales, Australia
- Curly Creek Falls, American waterfalls

== Other ==
- "Curly" (song), a 1969 song by The Move
- Curly: An Illustrated Biography of the Superstooge
- "Short and curlies" or just "curlies", a slang term for pubic hair

== See also ==
- Curlee (disambiguation)
- Curley (disambiguation)
- Curli
