= USS Curlew =

USS Curlew may refer to one of four ships of the United States Navy named for the Curlew:

- Curlew (steamboat), merchant propeller steamer, Union Navy gunboat and USQMD transport, referred to as USS Curlew in some dispatches.
- USS Curlew (1862), a Union Navy stern-wheel steamer, that was built in 1862 at Pittsburgh.
- USS Curlew (AM-8), a Lapwing-class minesweeper.
- USS Curlew (AM-69), a Catbird-class minesweeper.
- USS Curlew (AMS-8), formerly YMS-218, a motor minesweeper.

== See also ==
- USFS Curlew, a fishery vessel in the fleet of the United States Bureau of Fisheries
