= Culey =

Culey may refer to:

== People ==
- Marcus Culey (born 1993), Australian cyclist
- Culey, namesake of Ratcliffe Culey in Leicestershire, England

== Places ==
- Culey, Meuse, France
- Culey-le-Patry, France
- Loisey-Culey, France

== See also ==
- Curley (disambiguation)
- Culley (disambiguation)
