= Curlew Island =

Curlew Island may refer to:

- Curlew Island (Andaman and Nicobar Islands), India
- Curlew Island (Gulf Islands), British Columbia, Canada
- Curlew Island (South Australia), Australia
- Curlew Island (Tasmania), Australia

== See also ==
- Curlew (disambiguation)
