= McCully =

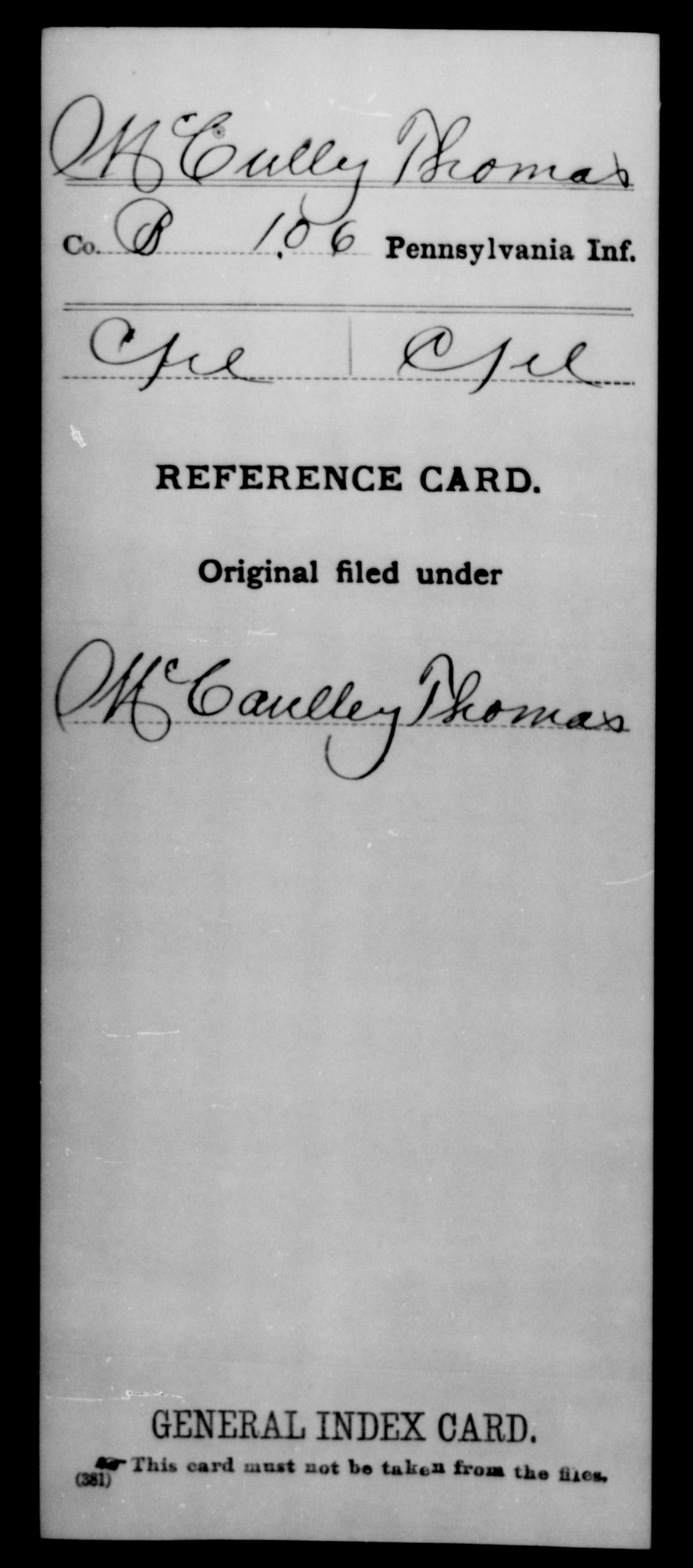
The Name

McCully is a variation of McCulloch, a common surname of Scottish origin. McCully may refer to the following people:

- Charlie McCully (1947–2007), Scottish-born American soccer player
- Ed McCully (1927–1956), American missionary
- Emily Arnold McCully (born 1939), American author
- Helen McCully (1902–1977), Canadian food writer, critic and cookbook author
- Henry McCully (born 1948), Scottish-born American soccer player
- Jonathan McCully (1809–1877), one of the Fathers of Canadian Confederation, senator and Nova Scotia Supreme Court judge
- Justin McCully (born 1976), American retired professional mixed martial artist and professional wrestler
- Kilmer S. McCully (1933–2025), Chief of Pathology and Laboratory Medicine Services for the United States Department of Veterans Affairs Medical Center
- Laura Elizabeth McCully (1886–1924), Canadian feminist and poet
- Lawrence McCully (1831–1892), a Justice of the Hawaii Supreme Court and Speaker of the Hawaii House of Representatives
- Margaret E. McCully (born ca. 1934), Canadian botanist
- Murray McCully (born 1953), New Zealand politician
- Newton A. McCully (1867–1951), United States Navy vice admiral
- Rachael McCully (born 1982), Australian basketball player
- one of the parties of Frampton v McCully, a New Zealand case
