= Curly =

Curly is a surname, given name, nickname or stage name. It may refer to:

== First name, nickname or stage name ==
- Crazy Horse (1840–1877), Oglala Sioux war chief nicknamed "Curly"
- Curly (scout), nickname of Ashishishe (c. 1856 – 1923), Crow Indian scout for General Custer
- Paul Carlyle Curly Armstrong (1918–1983), American basketball player
- Curly Bill Brocius, nickname of William Brocius (c. 1845 – 1882), American Old West gunman and outlaw
- Charles Roy Curly Brown (1888–1968), American Major League Baseball pitcher
- Harold Lee Curly Chalker (1931–1998), American country and jazz musician
- Robert F. Curly Clement (1919–2006), American baseball umpire
- Curly Ray Cline (1923–1997), American bluegrass fiddler
- Curly, nickname of George Andrew Davis Jr. (1920–1952), American World War II and Korean War flying ace
- Curly Joe DeRita, Three Stooges persona of Joseph Wardell, whose stage name was Joe DeRita (1909–1993), American actor and comedian
- Clarence T. "Curly" Edwinson (1912–1985). American fighter pilot and flying ace of World War II, football player and skeet shooter
- Curly Evans, nickname of Neal Evans (c. 1888 – 1945), American born Canadian freight industry entrepreneur
- Arnim LeRoy Curly Fox (1910–1995), American county music singer and musician
- Curly Hammond (1879–1963), English rugby union player
- Erling George Curly Haugland, American politician and businessman
- Hubert Edward Curly Hinchman (1907–1968), American football player
- Curly Howard, stage name of comic actor Jerome Lester Horwitz (1903–1952), Three Stooges actor
- Curly Howard (DJ), stage name of Howard Sisk (c. 1930 – 2001), on-air name of American disc jockey Howard Sisk
- Greg 'Curly' Keranen, American bassist and guitarist
- Earl Louis Curly Lambeau (1898–1965), founder, player and first coach of the Green Bay Packers
- Lillian Curly Lawrence, who was born William Morris Benjamin, also known as LBSC (1883–1967), British model locomotive designer
- Curly Lino, nickname of Frank Lino (born 1938), Sicilian-American mobster
- Albert Charles Curly Linton (1895–1985), Anzac veteran and Australian rules footballer
- Gordon 'Curly' Mack, full name is Gordon Sylvester Bradshaw Mack (1898–1948), Irish badminton player
- Curly M.C., a pseudonym of Michael Cretu (born 1957), Romanian-German musician
- Curly Moe, ring name Donald Chester Zalesky (1962–2015), Canadian-American wrestler
- Fred "Curly" Morrison (1926–2020), American National Football League player
- Frederick Curly Neal, nickname of Neal (1942–2020), American basketball player, member of the Harlem Globetrotters
- Olaf Gustave Hazard Curly Oden (1899–1978), American National Football League player
- Warren Harvey Curly Ogden (1901–1964), American Major League Baseball pitcher
- Milford Laurenson Curly Page (1902–1987), New Zealand cricketer
- Donald "Curly" Phillips (1884–1938) Canadian guide, outfitter, entrepreneur, and explorer
- Claude Curly Putman Jr. (born 1930), American songwriter
- John Ray Curly Seckler (born 1919), American bluegrass musician
- Edward Curly Thirlwell (1905–1985), American sound engineer nominated for two Academy Awards
- Konrad the Curly (c. 1198 – 1213), Polish noble

== Fictional characters ==
- Curly McLain, in the musical Oklahoma!
- Curly Washburn, in the movies City Slickers and City Slickers II: The Legend of Curly's Gold
- Norman Curly Watts, in the British soap opera Coronation Street
- Marshal "Curly" Wilcox, in the movie Stagecoach
- Curly, in the British period crime drama television series Peaky Blinders
- Curly, a friend of British comic character Dennis the Menace
- Curly, a Lost Boy in Peter Pan
- Curly, a rabbit in the Canadian television series Abby Hatcher
- Curly, a POV character in the indie game Mouthwashing
- Curly Brace, in the indie game Cave Story

== Animals ==
- "Curly" or "Little Curly", a nickname of Laika, the first dog in space
- Curly Horse, a curly-coated breed of horse
- Curly, the name of the first LaPerm cat

== See also ==
- Curlee (name)
- Curley, name list
- Curli, protein
- Bolesław IV the Curly (c. 1125 – 1173), Duke of Masovia and High Duke of Poland
