= Joan Howard Maurer =

American writer and actress (1927–2021)

- Born: Joan Sally Howard; April 2, 1927; United States
- Died: September 21, 2021 (aged 94); Los Angeles, California, U.S.
- Occupations: Writer, actress
- Spouse: Norman Maurer (m. 1947; died 1986)
- Children: 2
- Relatives: Moe Howard (father); Shemp Howard (paternal uncle); Curly Howard (paternal uncle)
- Writing career
- Years active: 1934–1980

Joan Howard Maurer (April 2, 1927 – September 21, 2021) was an American writer and actress, and the daughter of Moe Howard of the Three Stooges. She wrote several books on the Three Stooges and had several roles as a supporting actress during the Golden Age of Hollywood.

== Biography ==
In the 1980s, Maurer helped to raise funds for a cancer center dedicated to her father at the City of Hope National Medical Center by providing his autographs as incentives for donors to the facility in Duarte, California. After she discovered about 4,000 cancelled checks that had been signed by Howard, she offered to give one of the checks to each donor who gave $10 or more to the center.

She was married to cartoonist/director Norman Maurer, who wrote, produced, and directed many Stooges films.

All of her books were originally published by Citadel Press.

Maurer died in Los Angeles, California, on September 21, 2021, at the age of 94.

== Books ==
=== By Joan Howard Maurer ===
- The Three Stooges Book of Scripts ISBN 0-8065-1018-8; April 1984
- Curly: An Illustrated Biography of the Superstooge ISBN 0-8065-1086-2; April 1985

=== Co-authored by Joan Howard Maurer ===
- Moe Howard and the Three Stooges; written by Moe Howard, compiled by Joan Howard Maurer after Moe's death (July 1977)
- Lenburg, Jeff; Howard Maurer, Joan; Lenburg, Greg (1 April 2012) [1982]. The Three Stooges Scrapbook. Foreword by Joe Besser (Updated ed.). Chicago Review Press. ISBN 978-1-61374-074-3. LCCN 2011046838. OCLC 867774493. OL 25110042M – via Internet Archive. (not to be confused with The Three Stooges Scrapbook unsold 1960 television pilot)
- The Three Stooges Book of Scripts, Volume II; with Norman Maurer (April 1987; published after his death in 1986)
