= Moe Howard and the Three Stooges =

Book by Moe Howard

- Author: Moe Howard completed by Joan Howard Maurer
- Language: English
- Genre: Biography
- Publisher: Citadel Press
- Publication date: 1977
- Publication place: United States
- Media type: Print (Hardback & Paperback)
- Pages: 208
- ISBN: 0-8065-0723-3
- OCLC: 18138789

Moe Howard and the Three Stooges is the autobiography of Moe Howard of The Three Stooges. He spent his final days writing his autobiography, which he tentatively titled I Stooged to Conquer. However, Howard fell ill with lung cancer in May 1975 and died before it could be completed.

Howard's daughter Joan Howard Maurer completed her father's book and it was eventually published in 1977. While some of the dates and incidents are portrayed differently in other books that have since been published about the Stooges, Moe Howard and the Three Stooges offers insight to the team's career from Moe Howard's point of view.

The autobiography was re-released in July 2013 by Chicago Review Press as I Stooged to Conquer. The name change reflected the intended, original title of the book, which was changed by the publisher shortly before it went to press in 1977.

It had sold 52,000 copies by 1983.

== See also ==
- Moe Howard
- The Three Stooges
- List of Three Stooges shorts
- The Three Stooges filmography
