= Curley (disambiguation) =

Curley is a surname, given name or nickname.

Curley may also refer to:

- Curley, Côte-d'Or, a French commune
- Curley (film), a 1947 film produced by Hal Roach
- Archbishop Curley High School, a private boys' school in Baltimore, Maryland

== See also ==
- Corley (disambiguation)
- Cubley (disambiguation)
- Culey (disambiguation)
- Culley (disambiguation)
- Curlee (disambiguation)
- Curler (disambiguation)
- Curli
- Curly (disambiguation)
- Curlew (disambiguation)
- Curley v. NAMBLA
- Bluey and Curley
