= Cubley =

Cubley may refer to:

- Cubley, Derbyshire
- Cubley, South Yorkshire

== See also ==
- Curley (disambiguation)
