= The Toronto World =

Canadian periodical

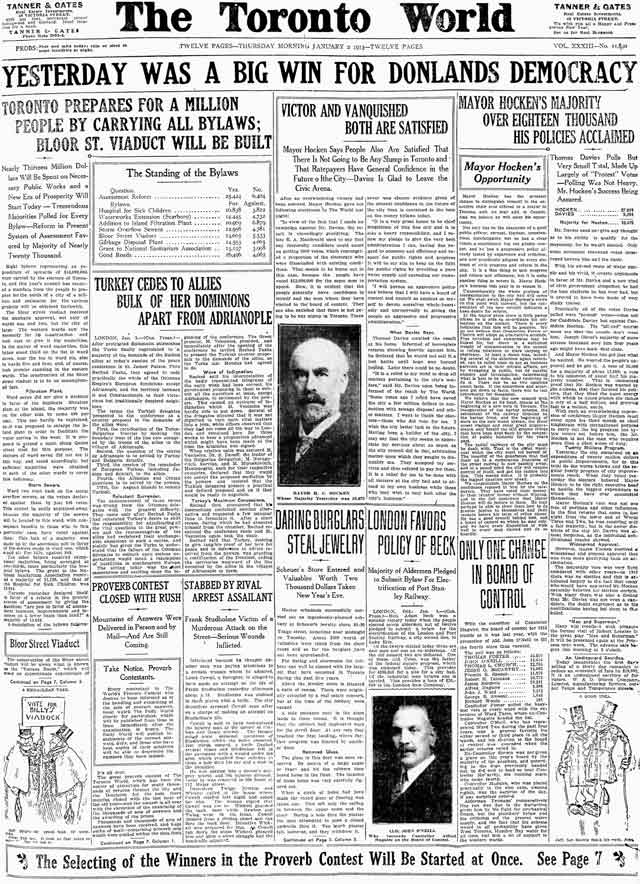
- Front page of The Toronto World, January 2, 1913
- Owner: William Findlay Maclean
- Founded: August 19, 1880 (daily); May 24, 1891 (Sunday)
- Ceased publication: April 9, 1921 (daily); November 1924 (Sunday)
- Political alignment: Initially Independent Liberal; later Independent Conservative
- Language: English
- City: Toronto, Ontario
- Country: Canada

The Toronto World was a Canadian newspaper based in Toronto, Ontario. It existed between 1880 and 1921, and a Sunday edition operated from 1891 to 1924. Founded by William Findlay "Billy" Maclean, it was popular among Toronto's working class and similar in style to The New York Herald. It was said to be the "editorially boldest" of the Toronto press, and was notable for its irreverence, noisy exposés of civic corruption, skilful skirting of the libel laws, and opposition to the religious establishment. Journalists such as Hector Charlesworth, Joseph E. Atkinson and John Bayne Maclean first worked there, before moving on to senior positions at other publications.

It once declared, "A newspaper editorially has no inherent personality of its own nor apart from that of the individuals who direct and control its policy. That is the basic element in journalism, though it is often forgotten or ignored by the public to whom it is of vital interest."

== History ==
During the 1880 byelection for West Toronto, Maclean was approached by city alderman Peter Ryan to form an evening newspaper to support his campaign as the Liberal candidate. At that time city editor for The Globe, Maclean and two other Globe reporters founded The World. Although originally intended to last just for that campaign period, Maclean liked it enough to continue publication afterwards as a morning newspaper.

=== Scoops ===
When the World published rumours in 1894 about the health of Prime Minister Sir John Thompson (which were subsequently confirmed by reports of his fatal heart attack at Windsor Castle), fellow Tories felt he had tried to destroy the party by making it look vulnerable and never forgave him.

In a 1905 exposé, it reported that the Globe was being used by Robert Jaffray (Note: publisher of the Globe) and George Cox to pressure the government of James Whitney to approve a grant of a third franchise by the Niagara Parks Commission (on which Jaffray was a commissioner) to the Electrical Development Company of Ontario (of which Cox was a director). It also reported that the State of Michigan was investigating the illegal use by Cox of trust money held by Canada Life, and that the Globe, the Star (Note: in which Cox was a major shareholder) and the News (Note: because of Cox's business connections with publisher Joseph Flavelle) went out of their way to support Canada Life's activities.

=== Espousal of populist causes ===
The World was a champion of many causes, including:

- criticizing the government of Oliver Mowat in the mid-1880s over its handling of liquor licensing and other issues;
- campaigning from 1894 for, and achieving a successful result in, an 1897 referendum that allowed Toronto's streetcars to operate on Sundays;
- campaigning in 1907 for the creation of what would later become Toronto Hydro, in order to provide a competitor for the Toronto Electric Light Company;
- support for subways, suffrage, and the Bloor Viaduct.

During most of this time, Maclean was also a nominally Conservative MP in the House of Commons of Canada, first for York East for 1892 to 1904, and then for York South from 1904 to 1926. Known for being unpredictably independent, he campaigned in the House and the World for a Bank of Canada, a national currency, the public ownership of railways, hydroelectricity, and telephones, a uniform passenger rate on trains, the rejection of reciprocity, a Canadian-made constitution and a Canadian head of state. He also supported Sir Wilfrid Laurier's naval policy in 1910.

=== Scandals ===
The World was caught up in several scandals of its own making:

- In 1911, the Globe claimed that the World had solicited deposits for the "rotten" Farmers' Bank of Canada in exchange for its financial support.
- Maclean's campaign for the construction of the Bloor Viaduct was compromised by his ownership of a farm west of the Don River valley.

=== The Sunday World ===
American Sunday newspapers became popular in Toronto in the 1880s, with the Buffalo Express even beginning a Canadian edition in 1887, but the Lord's Day Act prevented any local Sunday papers from being printed or sold on that day. By arranging for printing and distribution on Saturday night, but with a Sunday date, The Sunday World began circulation on Victoria Day, May 24, 1891, to compete against the popular Saturday weekend editions being issued by The Globe and The Daily Mail.

In 1895 it described itself as "the brightest, crispest, most cosmopolitan, most interesting of Canadian weeklies." Initially printed as an eight-page broadsheet, it was converted into a 24-page tabloid on January 20, 1901. It later added a half tone broadsheet supplement in 1902.

=== Relationships with other Toronto papers ===
When John A. Macdonald fell out with The Toronto Mail in 1887, he considered buying The World, but decided not to proceed when Maclean insisted on remaining as its editor in chief. Macdonald then went on to form the Toronto Empire.

The Toronto Star was first printed on World presses, and at its formation in 1892 The World owned a 51 percent interest in it as a silent partner. That arrangement only lasted for two months, during which time it was rumoured that Maclean was considering selling the Star to the Riordon family. (Note: owners of the Riordon Pulp and Paper Company, and investors in the Hamilton Spectator, Toronto Mail and the Toronto Evening News.) After an extensive fundraising campaign among the Star staff, Maclean agreed to sell his interest to Horatio Clarence Hocken.

=== Financial difficulties ===
The World always experienced cash flow problems during its existence, as Maclean drew profits from it to fund his other interests as a politician, horse breeder, and land speculator. The Globe described him as being the "poorest of business men", but in 1913 the Canadian Courier described him as "the only newspaper proprietor who was ever unable to pay all salaries regularly and publish a paper and remain popular."

His need for cash led some to believe that his editorial views were for sale:

- Following the 1897 Sunday streetcar referendum, the World was rewarded by the Toronto Railway Company;
- In return for purchasing large volumes of advertising, the World would write puff pieces about the advertisers;
- In 1902, it was rumoured that Joseph Flavelle was considering purchasing the World for $350,000, being $50,000 for the newspaper itself and $300,000 for "goodwill".

== Closure ==
In March 1920, creditors forced the World to go into liquidation. There were rumours that it would be sold, with possible buyers said to include the United Farmers of Ontario and the Southam newspaper chain, (Note: a predecessor of Postmedia News) but the daily edition was closed in 1921, with all assets sold to The Mail and Empire. The Sunday World was later sold to The Toronto Star in 1924 to be merged with the Star Weekly. Toronto would not have a Sunday newspaper again until The Toronto Telegram published Sunday editions for a few months in 1957, followed by a more successful introduction by The Toronto Sun of a continuing Sunday edition beginning in 1973.

== See also ==
- Sam Hunter (cartoonist), cartoonist who worked for The Toronto World for twenty years from 1897
- William Findlay Maclean
- Lou Skuce, staff cartoonist and art editor for The Toronto Sunday World
- Herbert Henry Ball
- Laura Elizabeth McCully
- Media in Toronto

== Sources ==
- Archer, William L. (1947). Joe Atkinson's Toronto Star: The Genius of Crooked Lane. Montreal.
- Bradburn, Jamie (March 17, 2012). "Historicist: The World of William Findlay Maclean". torontoist.com.
- Gabriele, Sandra; Moore, Paul (2009). "The Globe on Saturday, The World on Sunday: Toronto Weekend Editions and the Influence of the American Sunday Paper, 1886-1895". Canadian Journal of Communication. 34 (3). Vancouver: Canadian Centre for Studies in Publishing, Simon Fraser University: 337–358. doi:10.22230/cjc.2009v34n3a2153. ISSN 1499-6642.
- Rutherford, Paul (1982). "Riordon (Riordan), John". In Halpenny, Francess G. (ed.). Dictionary of Canadian Biography. Vol. XI (1881–1890) (online ed.). University of Toronto Press.
- Sotiron, Minko (1997). From Politics to Profit: The Commercialization of Canadian Daily Newspapers, 1890-1920. McGill-Queen's University Press. ISBN 0-7735-1375-2.
- Sotiron, Minko (2005). "Maclean, William Findlay". In Cook, Ramsay; Bélanger, Réal (eds.). Dictionary of Canadian Biography. Vol. XV (1921–1930) (online ed.). University of Toronto Press.
