= Moe Howard =

American comedian and actor (1897–1975)

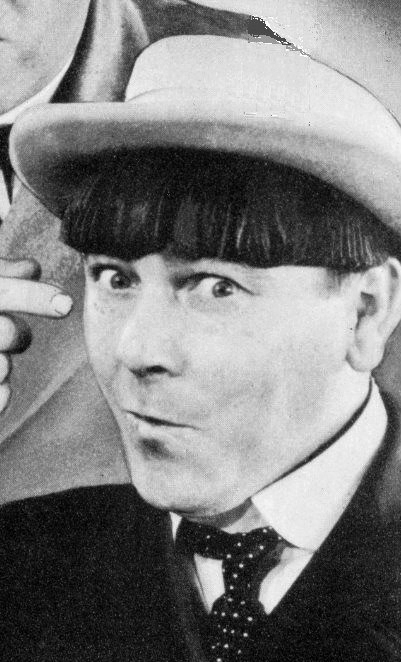
- Howard in 1937
- Born: Moses Harry Horwitz; June 19, 1897; Brooklyn, New York, U.S.
- Died: May 4, 1975 (aged 77); Los Angeles, California, U.S.
- Resting place: Hillside Memorial Park Cemetery
- Other name: Harry Howard
- Occupations: Comedian; actor
- Years active: 1909–1975
- Spouse: Helen Schonberger (m. 1925)
- Children: Two, including Joan Howard Maurer
- Relatives: Curly Howard (brother); Shemp Howard (brother)
- Website: www.threestooges.com

Moe Howard (born Moses Harry Horwitz; June 19, 1897 – May 4, 1975) was an American comedian and actor. He is best known as the leader and straight man of The Three Stooges, the farce comedy team who starred in motion pictures, short films, and television for four decades. The group started out as Ted Healy and His Stooges, an act that toured the vaudeville circuit. Moe's distinctive hairstyle came about when he was a boy and cut off his curls with a pair of scissors, producing an irregular shape approximating a bowl cut.

== Early life ==
Howard was born as Moses Harry Horwitz on June 19, 1897, in the Brooklyn, New York neighborhood of Bensonhurst, the fourth of five sons of Lithuanian Jewish immigrants Jennie (née Gorovitz) and Solomon Horwitz. He was called Moe as a child and later called himself Harry. His parents and brothers Benjamin ("Jack") and Isidore (Irving) were not involved in show business. However he, his older brother Samuel ("Shemp"), and his younger brother Jerome ("Curly") eventually became known professionally as The Three Stooges.

He loved to read, as his older brother Jack recalled: "I had many Horatio Alger books, and it was Moe's greatest pleasure to read them. They started his imaginative mind working and gave him ideas by the dozen. I think they were instrumental in putting thoughts into his head to become a person of good character and successful." This helped him in his acting career; he could memorize his lines quickly and easily.

Howard's "bowl cut" hairstyle became his trademark, despite his mother initially refusing to cut his hair in childhood, letting it grow to shoulder length. He secretly cut his hair in his backyard shed after being frequently teased in school. During one appearance on The Mike Douglas Show in the 1970s, he stated, "I used to fight my way to school, in school, and back home from school."

Howard developed an interest in acting, which caused his grades to worsen and prompted him to became a truant: "I used to stand outside the theater knowing the truant officer was looking for me. I would stand there 'til someone came along and ask them to buy my ticket. An adult needed to accompany a juvenile into the theater. When I succeeded, I'd give him my ten cents—that's all it cost—and I'd go up to the top of the balcony where I'd put my chin on the rail and watch, spellbound, from the first act to the last. I would usually select the actor I liked the most and follow his performance throughout the play."

Despite his waning attendance, Howard graduated from P.S. 163 in Brooklyn, but he dropped out of Erasmus Hall High School after two months, ending his formal education. He took an electric shop course to please his parents but quit after a few months to pursue a career in show business.

Howard started off running unpaid errands at the Vitagraph Studios in Midwood, Brooklyn and was rewarded with bit parts in movies in production there, until a 1910 fire destroyed the films done there, and with it, most of Howard's work. Already in 1909, he had met a young man named Ernest Lea Nash (later known as Ted Healy), who was later to provide a significant boost for his career aspirations. In 1912, they both held a summer job working in Annette Kellermann's aquatic act as diving "girls".

== Career ==
Howard continued his attempts at gaining show-business experience by singing in a bar with his older brother Shemp, until their father put a stop to it. Starting in 1914, they performed with a minstrel show troupe on a Mississippi River showboat for two summers, presenting an act they called "Howard and Howard—A Study in Black". At the same time, they worked for a rival vaudeville circuit without makeup.

In 1922, Howard joined Ted Healy in a vaudeville routine. In 1923, Moe saw Shemp in the audience during a theater performance and yelled at him from the stage. Shemp responded by heckling Moe, and the two brothers' amusing bickering during the performance resulted in Healy's immediately hiring Shemp as a permanent part of the act.

Moe retired in June 1925 after his marriage to Helen Schonberger and went into real estate with his mother. Meanwhile, Healy's act with frequent stooge Shemp Howard went on to national fame in the Shubert Brothers' A Night in Spain, which had a successful Broadway run, as well as a national tour. During A Night in Spain, and at the end of a four-month run in Chicago, Healy recruited vaudeville violinist Larry Fine to join the troupe in March 1928.

After the show ended in late November, Healy signed for the Shuberts' new revue A Night in Venice and coaxed Moe Howard out of retirement to rejoin the act in December 1928. In rehearsals in early 1929, Howard, Larry Fine, and Shemp Howard came together for the first time as a trio. When A Night in Venice closed in March 1930, Healy and the trio toured for a while as "Ted Healy and His Racketeers" (later changed to Ted Healy and His Stooges).

=== Ted Healy and His Stooges ===
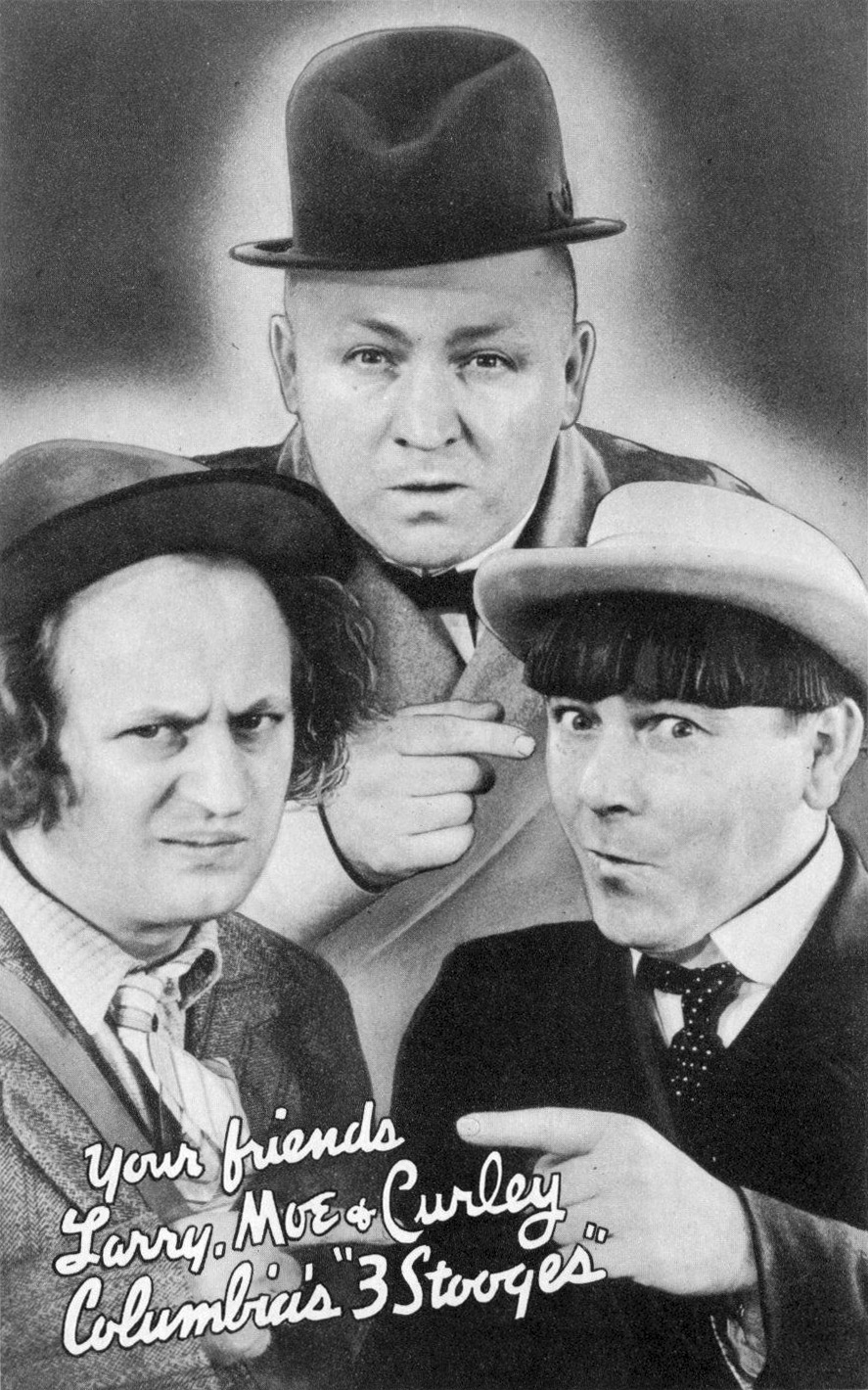
Larry Fine, Curly Howard, and Moe in 1937

Ted Healy and His Stooges were on the verge of hitting the big time and made their first movie, Soup to Nuts (1930), featuring Healy and his four Stooges: Moe (billed as "Harry Howard"), Shemp, Larry, and Fred Sanborn (Sanborn had been with Healy's troupe since January 1929, as one of the stooges in "A Night in Venice")—for Fox Films (later 20th Century Fox). A disagreement with Healy led Moe, Larry, and Shemp to strike out on their own as "Howard, Fine, and Howard," and on August 28, 1930, they premiered that act at L.A.'s Paramount Theatre. Joining the RKO vaudeville circuit, they toured for almost two years, eventually dubbing themselves as "Three Lost Souls" and taking on Jack Walsh as their straight man.

In July 1932, Moe, Larry, and Shemp were approached by Healy to rejoin him for the new Shubert Broadway revue Passing Show of 1932, and the three accepted the offer. On August 16, 1932, during Passing rehearsals in New York, Ted walked out on the Shuberts over a contract dispute. On August 19, 1932, Shemp gave his notice, having not seen eye-to-eye with the hard-drinking and sometimes belligerent Healy, and decided to remain with Passing. That show closed in September after bad reviews of its first roadshow performances in Detroit and Cincinnati. Shemp landed at Vitaphone Studios in Brooklyn in May 1933, where he stayed for almost four years.

On August 20, the day after Shemp's departure, Moe suggested adding his youngest brother Jerome ("Babe" to Moe and Shemp) to the act; contrary to some sources, no search for a replacement was conducted. Healy initially passed on Jerry, but Jerry was so eager to join the act that he shaved off his luxuriant auburn mustache and hair and ran on stage during Healy's routine. That finally got Healy to hire Jerry, who took the stage name Curly. The new lineup of Moe, Larry, and Curly premiered with Ted on stage at Cleveland's RKO Palace on August 27, 1932. Early in 1933 during appearances in Los Angeles, Healy and the Stooges were hired by Metro-Goldwyn-Mayer as "nut" comics to liven up feature films and short subjects with their antics.

=== The Three Stooges ===
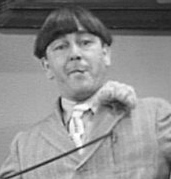
Moe playing harmonica in Disorder in the Court in 1936

After several appearances in several MGM films, Healy was being groomed as a solo character comedian. In 1934, his Stooges, then named The Three Stooges, signed with Columbia Pictures, where they stayed until December 1957, making 190 comedy shorts.

With Healy's departure, Moe assumed Healy's prior role as the aggressive, take-charge leader of the team: a short-tempered bully, prone to slapstick violence against the other two Stooges. Despite his outwardly rather cruel demeanor towards his pals, Moe was also very loyal and protective of the other Stooges on film, keeping them from harm, and, should it befall them, doing whatever it took to save them.

He emphasized in his autobiography that the ill-tempered aspects of his on-screen persona did not reflect his real personality. He also boasted of being a shrewd businessman by wisely investing the money made from his film career. Still, the Stooges received no subsequent royalties (i.e., residuals) from any of their many shorts; they were paid a flat amount for each one, and Columbia owned the rights (and profits) thereafter. However, according to Larry Fine, in the 1970s, Columbia allowed the Stooges to do live tours when they were not filming in exchange for a half-salary during those months. Fine indicated that the profits from the tours substantially increased their yearly take.

Columbia released its first Three Stooges short, Woman Haters (1934), where their stooge characters were not quite fully formed. It was not a Stooge comedy in the classic sense, but rather a musical romantic farce; Columbia was then making a series of two-reel "Musical Novelties" with the dialogue delivered in rhyme, and the Stooges were recruited to support comedian Marjorie White. Only after the Stooges became established as short-subject stars, the main titles changed to give the Stooges top billing. The version seen on TV and video today is this reissue print.

Their next film, Punch Drunks (1934), was the only short film written entirely by the Three Stooges, with Curly as a reluctant boxer who goes ballistic every time he hears "Pop Goes the Weasel". Their next short, Men in Black (also 1934), a parody of the contemporary hospital drama Men in White, was their first and only film to be nominated for an Academy Award (with the classic catchphrases "Calling Dr. Howard, Dr. Fine, Dr. Howard" followed by their reiterated unison declaration as young doctors, "For Duty and Humanity!!"). They continued making short films at a steady pace of eight per year, such as Three Little Pigskins (also 1934) with a young Lucille Ball, Pop Goes the Easel (1935), and Hoi Polloi (also 1935), in which two professors make a bet trying to turn the Three Stooges into gentlemen.

==== 1940s ====
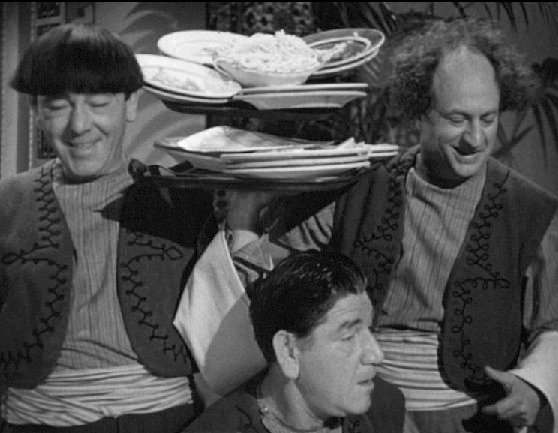
Howard (left) with Shemp Howard and Larry Fine in Malice in the Palace in 1949

In the 1940s, the Three Stooges became topical, making several anti-Nazi short films, including You Nazty Spy! (1940) Moe's favorite Three Stooges film, I'll Never Heil Again (1941), and They Stooge to Conga (1943). Moe's impersonation of Adolf Hitler highlighted these shorts, the first of which preceded Charlie Chaplin's film satire The Great Dictator by nine months.

On May 6, 1946, during the filming of Half-Wits Holiday (1947), brother Curly suffered a stroke. He had already suffered a series of them before the filming of Beer Barrel Polecats (1946) and was replaced by Shemp, who agreed to return to the group, but only until Curly would be well enough to rejoin. However, Curly appeared in Hold That Lion! (1947) in a cameo (the only Three Stooges film to contain all three Howard brothers: Moe, Curly, and Shemp); it was an impromptu setup. He was well enough to participate in a second cameo the next year as a chef in a short scene in Malice in the Palace, but the footage was never used. Curly suffered a second series of strokes which led to his death at age 48 on January 18, 1952.

After Shemp rejoined the act, Moe, Shemp, and Larry shot a television pilot for ABC called Jerks of All Trades (1949), apparently intended to lead to a weekly sitcom series on the premise that the Stooges would try a different job or business every week, hoping that eventually one of their attempts would be successful. Anything they tried turned out to be a fiasco, which was the source of the comedy. The pilot took a single day to film and was never aired. It was a kinescope film of three-camera television production, most likely to replicate a proposed live broadcast.

B.B. Kahane, Columbia Pictures' vice president of business affairs, stopped the show from being broadcast. Kahane warned the Stooges that a contract stipulation restricted them from performing in a TV series that might compete with their two-reel comedies. Columbia threatened to cancel the boys' contract and take them to court if they tried to sell the series. To avert a legal hassle, the pilot was shelved and the project abandoned. The kinescope film is now in the public domain and widely available. However, Columbia did allow The Stooges to make guest appearances on various TV variety shows.

==== 1950s ====
The Three Stooges' series of shorts continued to be popular through the 1950s; Shemp co-starred in 73 comedies. The Stooges also co-starred in a George O'Brien Western, Gold Raiders (1951). Moe also co-produced occasional Western and musical films in the 1950s.

On November 22, 1955, Shemp died of a massive cerebral hemorrhage, necessitating another Stooge. Producer Jules White used old footage of Shemp to complete four more films, with Columbia regular Joe Palma filling in for Shemp (thus creating the Fake Shemp phenomenon), until Columbia head Harry Cohn hired Joe Besser in 1956. According to Moe's autobiography, Howard wanted a "two-stooge" act, and Cohn's idea, not Howard's, was to replace Shemp as part of the act.

The Stooges replaced Shemp with Besser; already an established Columbia comedy shorts star in his own right and frequent movie supporting player. Joe, Larry, and Moe filmed 16 shorts through December 1957. Shortly before Cohn's death in February 1958, the making of short subjects ended. Keeping himself busy, Moe was hired by Harry Romm as associate producer. According to Moe, stories (and later, scenes in a 2000 made-for-TV biopic) that he was forced to take a job as a gofer at Columbia are entirely false.

=== Television and advent of Curly Joe ===
Columbia sold the Three Stooges' library of short films to television under the Screen Gems name. With this, the Three Stooges quickly gained a new audience of young fans. Ever the businessman, Moe Howard put together a new Stooges act, with burlesque and screen comic Joe DeRita (dubbed "Curly Joe" because of his vague resemblance to Moe's late younger brother Curly Howard and to differentiate him from Joe Besser) as the new "third Stooge". DeRita, like Shemp Howard and Joe Besser, had starred in a series of his comedy shorts. Several local television children's shows around the country began running the Stooges films, among them Paul Shannon, host of Adventure Time at WTAE-TV in Pittsburgh and Sally Starr at WFIL-TV (now WPVI-TV) in Philadelphia. The films were so popular some young fans tried to emulate Moe's slapping, gouging, and hitting, prompting the Stooges to warn them against trying to re-create those actions.

The revitalized trio starred in six feature-length movies: Have Rocket, Will Travel (1959); Snow White and the Three Stooges (1961), The Three Stooges Meet Hercules and The Three Stooges in Orbit (1962), The Three Stooges Go Around the World in a Daze (1963), and The Outlaws Is Coming (1965).

Howard, Larry, and Curly Joe continued to make live appearances, many notable "guest appearances", particularly in It's a Mad, Mad, Mad, Mad World (1963) as three firemen who appear for only a few seconds, and a longer appearance in 4 for Texas (also 1963) starring Frank Sinatra and Dean Martin. The men tried their hand at a children's cartoon show titled The New Three Stooges, with the cartoons sandwiched between live-action segments of the Stooges filmed in color.

During this period, Moe and the Stooges appeared on numerous television shows, including The Steve Allen Show, Here's Hollywood, Masquerade Party, The Ed Sullivan Show, Danny Thomas Meets the Comics, The Joey Bishop Show, Off to See the Wizard, and Truth or Consequences but, by the late 1960s, they were all at an age where they could no longer risk serious injury while performing slapstick comedy.

=== Later years ===
The men were paid residuals for their later efforts and continued to receive the bulk of the profits from sales of Stooges merchandise. Moe sold real estate when his show-business life slowed down. However, he still did minor solo roles and walk-on bits in movies, such as Don't Worry, We'll Think of a Title (1966) and Doctor Death: Seeker of Souls (1973), as well as several appearances on The Mike Douglas Show in the 1970s.

In one of Douglas's episodes, Moe, his hair in a style popular at the time, made a surprise appearance during an interview with the writer of a "where-are-they-now" book. When the audience was given a chance to ask the writer about famous people, Howard asked, "Whatever happened to the Three Stooges?" Finally recognized by Douglas, he combed his hair into his trademark style.

The Stooges attempted to make a final film in 1969, Kook's Tour, which was essentially a documentary of Howard, Larry, and Curly Joe out of character, touring the US, and meeting with fans. Production halted when on January 9, 1970, Larry suffered a major stroke during filming, paralyzing the left side of his body. He died on January 24, 1975, at age 72. Enough footage of Larry was shot so that Kook's Tour was eventually released in a 52-minute version to home video. After Fine's stroke, Howard asked longtime Three Stooges supporting actor Emil Sitka to replace Larry, but this final lineup never shot any material.

== Personal life ==
On June 7, 1925, Moe Howard married Helen Schonberger (December 19, 1899 – October 31, 1975), a cousin of Harry Houdini. The following year, Schonberger persuaded Howard to retire since she was pregnant. Howard attempted to earn a living in a succession of "normal" jobs, none of which was very successful, and he soon returned to working with Ted Healy.

Howard and Schonberger had two children, Joan Howard (April 2, 1927 – September 21, 2021) and Paul Howard (July 8, 1935 – November 6, 2026).

In June 1945, Howard legally had his name changed from Moses Horwitz to Moe Howard.

== Death and legacy ==
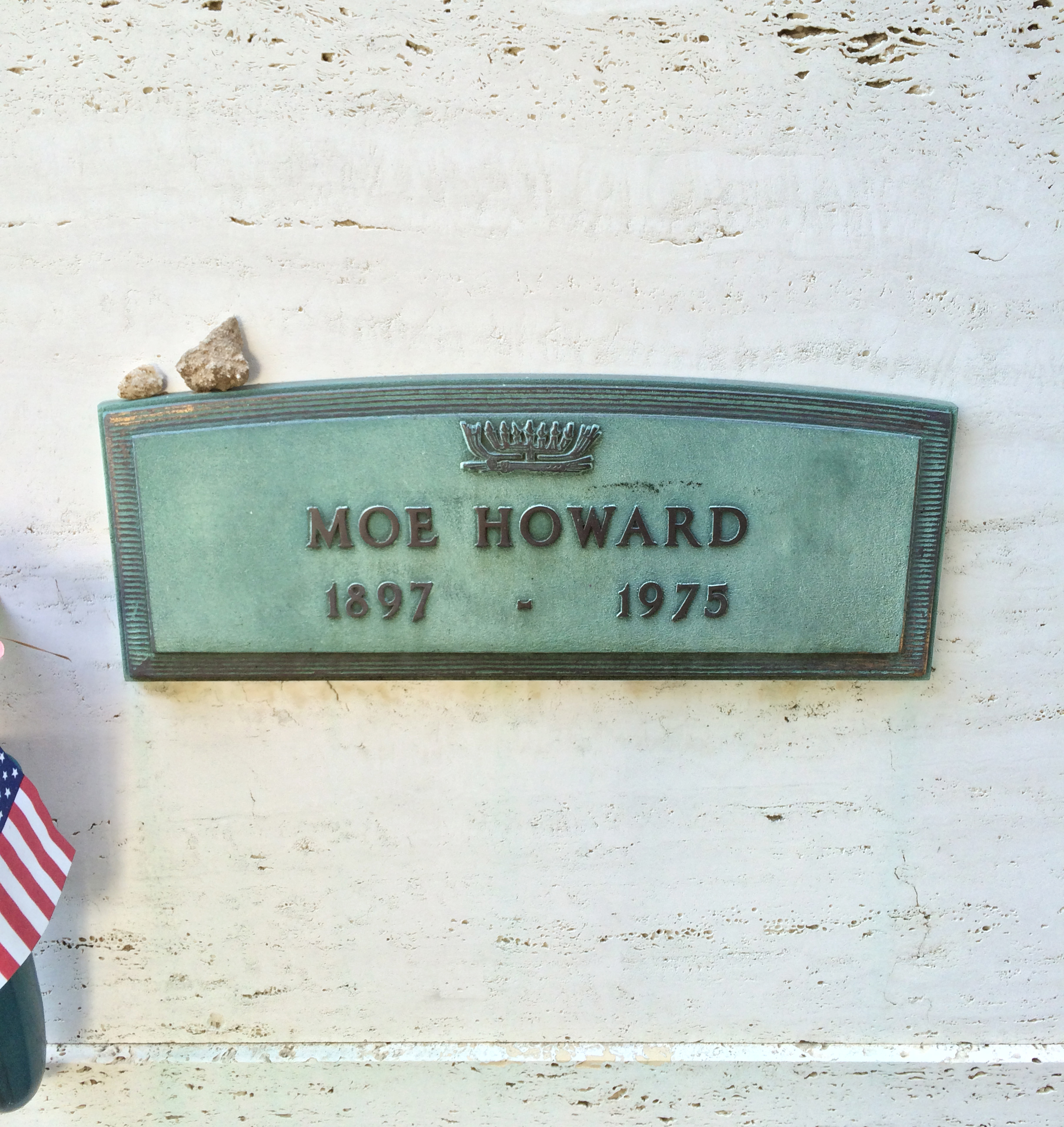
Moe's outdoor mausoleum crypt at Hillside Memorial Park

Howard died of lung cancer at age 77 on May 4, 1975, at Cedars-Sinai Medical Center in Los Angeles, where he had been admitted a week earlier in April, just over three months after Larry Fine's death, and just short of his 78th birthday. He was a heavy smoker for much of his adult life. He is entombed in an outdoor crypt at Culver City's Hillside Memorial Park Cemetery. His wife Helen Schonberger died of a heart attack on October 31, 1975, at age 75 and is interred in the crypt next to him on the right. At the time of his death, Howard was working on his autobiography titled I Stooged to Conquer. It was released in 1977 as Moe Howard and the Three Stooges.

Howard and the Three Stooges received a posthumous star on the Hollywood Walk of Fame on August 30, 1983, at 1560 Vine Street.

Howard was portrayed by Paul Ben-Victor in The Three Stooges, a 2000 made-for-TV biopic that focused on the trio's years in show business and their off-screen lives. In the 2012 Farrelly brothers' film The Three Stooges, Chris Diamantopoulos portrays Moe and Skyler Gisondo portrays Young Moe.
