= Corley (disambiguation) =

Corley is a village in Warwickshire, England.

Corley may also refer to:

== Places in the United States ==
- Corley (surname)
- Corley, Arkansas, US, an unincorporated community
- Corley, Iowa, US, an unincorporated community
- Corley, Texas, US, an unincorporated community
- Corley, Barbour County, West Virginia
- Corley, Braxton County, West Virginia

== Other ==
- Corley services, a motorway services located near the English village
- The Corley Conspiracy, an opera
- C.E. Corley House, a historic home near Lexington, Kentucky
- A character in several Lenehan and Corley stories by James Joyce

== See also ==
- Curley (disambiguation)
