= Culley (given name) =

Culley is a given name. Notable people with the name include:

- Culley C. Carson III (born 1945), American urologist
- Culley Rikard (1914–2000), American baseball player

== See also ==
- Culley (surname)
- Curley
- Cully (disambiguation) § First name or nickname
