= Curler =

Curler may refer to:

- a sportsperson who plays curling
- a curling iron
- a hair roller

== See also ==
- Curlee (disambiguation)
- Curlew (disambiguation)
- Curley (disambiguation)
