= Cully =

Cully may refer to:

== Places ==
- Cully, Calvados, a former commune in the Allier department, France
- Cully, Switzerland, a municipality in the canton of Vaud
- Cully, Portland, Oregon, United States, a neighborhood in northeast Portland

== People ==
=== Given name or nickname ===
- Cully Dahlstrom (1912–1998), American ice hockey player
- Cully Hamner (born 1969), American comic book artist and writer
- Cully Lidberg (1900–1987), American football player
- Cully Richards (1908–1978), American singer and actor
- Cully Simon (1918–1980), Canadian ice hockey player
- Cully Wilson (1892–1962), Canadian ice hockey player

=== Surname ===
- Barbara Cully (born 1955), American poet
- Zara Cully (1892–1978), American actress

== Characters ==
- Cully Wilson (Lassie), on the TV show Lassie
- Cully Barnaby, on the show Midsomer Murders

== See also ==
- Culley (disambiguation)
- McCully, mostly a surname
