= Culey, Meuse =

Culey
- Commune
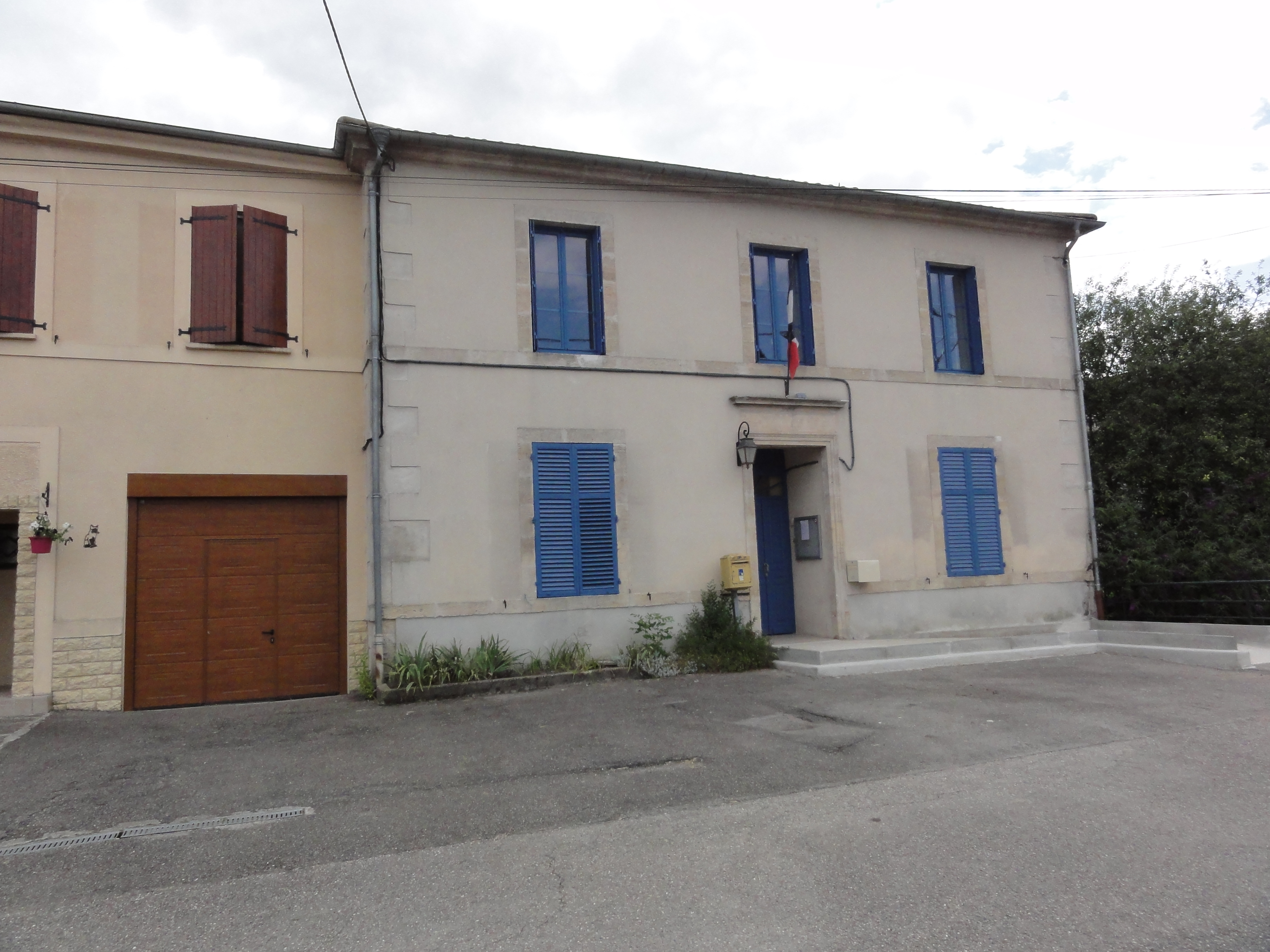
- The town hall in Culey

- Coat of arms
- Location of Culey
- Location within France Location within Grand Est
- Coordinates: 48°45′19″N 5°15′59″E
- Country: France
- Region: Grand Est
- Department: Meuse
- Arrondissement: Bar-le-Duc
- Canton: Vaucouleurs
- Intercommunality: CA Bar-le-Duc - Sud Meuse

Government
  - Mayor (2020–2026): Lyderic Enchery
- Area^{1}: 11.02 km^{2} (4.25 sq mi)
- Population (2023): 122
  - Density: 11.1/km^{2} (28.7/sq mi)
- Time zone: UTC+01:00 (CET)
  - Summer (DST): UTC+02:00 (CEST)
- INSEE/Postal code: 55138 /55000
- ^{1} French Land Register data, which excludes lakes, ponds, glaciers > 1 km^{2} (0.386 sq mi or 247 acres) and river estuaries.

Culey (French pronunciation: [kylɛ]) is a commune in the Meuse department in Grand Est in north-eastern France. Between 1973 and 2014 it was part of the commune of Loisey-Culey.

== See also ==
- Communes of the Meuse department
