= Margaret E. McCully =

Canadian psychologist, microbiologis,t and plant biologist

Margaret Elizabeth McCully
- Born: 1934 (age 91–92); St. Marys, Ontario, Canada
- Education: University of Toronto (B.Sc., M.Sc.); Harvard University (Ph.D.)
- Awards: George Lawson Medal; ISRR Lifetime Award (2015)(1996); Fellow of the Royal Society of Canada (1987)
- Scientific career
- Fields: Botany; Cell biology; Phycology; Microbiology; Plant biology
- Workplaces: University of Toronto; Carleton University; CSIRO

Margaret Elizabeth McCully FRSC (born ca. 1934? in St. Marys, Ontario) is a Canadian botanist and cell biologist, known as one of the world's leading experts on plant root structure. In 1996 the Canadian Botanical Association awarded her the George Lawson Medal (Category B) for lifetime contribution to botany. In 2015 she received the inaugural ISRR Lifetime Award from the International Society of Root Research.

== Biography ==
Margaret E. McCully graduated in 1956 with a B.Sc. in agriculture from the University of Toronto. After two years of teaching chemistry and biology at Ontario's Shelburne High School, she became a graduate student at the University of Toronto, where she graduated with an M.Sc. in plant ecology. Her master's thesis deals with the morphology and ecology of the aquatic plant Hippuris vulgaris. After two years of teaching biology in a school in England, she matriculated at Harvard University, where she graduated in 1996 with a Ph.D. in cell biology. Her doctoral dissertation involves histological studies of the intertidal seaweed Fucus, a genus of brown algae.

At Carleton University, McCully joined the faculty in 1966 as an assistant professor, was appointed a full professor in 1977, and retired there in 1999 as professor emerita of biology. For a number of years, she was the director of the University of Carleton's Cryo-analytical Microscopy Facility.

She was married to the plant physiologist Martin Canny (1931–2013), who was appointed in 1986 an Honorary Research Professor at Carleton University. He had been previously married. In the late 1990s, Martin Canny and Margaret McCully moved from Ottawa to Canberra, where he was appointed Visiting Fellow at the Australian National University's Research School of Biology. The married couple collaborated for over a quarter of a century. In Canberra, McCully continued doing research at the Division of Plant Industry of CSIRO, while mentoring students at Australia National University, at Charles Sturt University, and at CSIRO.

During her career, she has held visiting positions in England at the University of Leeds and the University of Oxford, in the US at the University of California at Davis, and in Australia at Monash University, the University of Melbourne, LaTrobe University, Australian National University, and the University of Western Australia. In 1994 she gave the Hamm Lecture at the University of Minnesota.

McCully has done outstanding research on plant root structure and the effects on plant function caused by interactions among roots, soils, and bacteria. She pioneered the use of modern optical and electron microscopy to study root development and its relation to soil bacteria and soil structure. Her research topics include biology of the rhizosphere, water status of plants, and ion uptake.

She is the co-author of two books and the author or co-author of more than 160 scientific articles. Many of her former students became academically successful in research positions.

In 1987, she was elected a Fellow of the Royal Society of Canada. In 1993, Calgary's St. Mary's University honoured her with a D.Sc. (honoris cause). In 1999 in St. Louis, the XVI International Botanical Congress honoured her and her research.

== Selected publications ==
=== Articles ===
- O'Brien, T.; Feder, N.; McCully, M.E. (1964). "Polychromatic staining of plant cell walls by toluidine blue O" (PDF). Protoplasma. 59 (2): 368–373. doi:10.1007/BF01248568. S2CID 33072349.
- Hughes, J.; McCully, Margaret E. (1975). "The Use of an Optical Brightener in the Study of Plant Structure". Stain Technology. 50 (5): 319–329. doi:10.3109/10520297509117082. PMID 54956.
- Smith, M. M.; McCully, M. E. (1978). "A critical evaluation of the specificity of aniline blue induced fluorescence". Protoplasma. 95 (3): 229–254. doi:10.1007/BF01294453. S2CID 33024656.
- Vermeer, J.; McCully, M. E. (1982). "The rhizosphere in Zea: New insight into its structure and development". Planta. 156 (1): 45–61. doi:10.1007/BF00393442. PMID 24272215. S2CID 33190648.
- Hoppe, D. C.; McCully, M. E.; Wenzel, C. L. (1986). "The nodal roots of Zea: Their development in relation to structural features of the stem". Canadian Journal of Botany. 64 (11): 2524–2537. doi:10.1139/b86-335.
- McCully, M. E.; Canny, M. J. (1988). "Pathways and processes of water and nutrient movement in roots". Plant and Soil. 111 (2): 159–170. doi:10.1007/BF02139932. S2CID 22909072.
- Dong, Z.; Canny, M. J.; McCully, M. E.; Roboredo, M. R.; Cabadilla, C. F.; Ortega, E.; Rodes, R. (1994). "A Nitrogen-Fixing Endophyte of Sugarcane Stems (A New Role for the Apoplast)". Plant Physiology. 105 (4): 1139–1147. doi:10.1104/pp.105.4.1139. PMC 159442. PMID 12232271.
- Watt, M.; McCully, M. E.; Canny, M. J. (1994). "Formation and Stabilization of Rhizosheaths of Zea mays L. (Effect of Soil Water Content)". Plant Physiology. 106 (1): 179–186. doi:10.1104/pp.106.1.179. PMC 159514. PMID 12232317. S2CID 45433595.
- McCully, M. E.; Boyer, J. S. (1997). "The expansion of maize root-cap mucilage during hydration. 3. Changes in water potential and water content". Physiologia Plantarum. 99: 169–177. doi:10.1111/j.1399-3054.1997.tb03445.x.
- McCully, Margaret E. (1999). "Roots in Soil: Unearthing the Complexities of Roots and Their Rhizospheres". Annual Review of Plant Physiology and Plant Molecular Biology. 50: 695–718. doi:10.1146/annurev.arplant.50.1.695. PMID 15012224.
- McCully, Margaret E. (2001). "Niches for bacterial endophytes in crop plants: A plant biologist's view". Functional Plant Biology. 28 (9): 983. doi:10.1071/pp01101.
- Shane, M. W.; McCully, M. E.; Lambers, H. (2004). "Tissue and cellular phosphorus storage during development of phosphorus toxicity in Hakea prostrata (Proteaceae)". Journal of Experimental Botany. 55 (399): 1033–1044. doi:10.1093/jxb/erh111. PMID 15047760.
- Watt, Michelle; Magee, Linda J.; McCully, Margaret E. (2008). "Types, structure and potential for axial water flow in the deepest roots of field‐grown cereals". New Phytologist. 178 (1): 135–146. doi:10.1111/j.1469-8137.2007.02358.x. PMID 18221246.
- McCully, Margaret E.; Canny, Martin J.; Huang, Cheng X. (2009). "Invited Review: Cryo-scanning electron microscopy (CSEM) in the advancement of functional plant biology. Morphological and anatomical applications". Functional Plant Biology. 36 (2): 97–124. doi:10.1071/FP08304. PMID 32688631.
- Bean, G. J.; Flickinger, S. T.; Westler, W. M.; McCully, M. E.; Sept, D.; Weibel, D. B.; Amann, K. J. (2009). "A22 Disrupts the Bacterial Actin Cytoskeleton by Directly Binding and Inducing a Low-Affinity State in MreB". Biochemistry. 48 (22): 4852–4857. doi:10.1021/bi900014d. PMC 3951351. PMID 19382805.
- McCully, Margaret E.; Canny, Martin J.; Huang, Cheng X.; Miller, Celia; Brink, Frank (2010). "Cryo-scanning electron microscopy (CSEM) in the advancement of functional plant biology: Energy dispersive X-ray microanalysis (CEDX) applications". Functional Plant Biology. 37 (11): 1011. doi:10.1071/FP10095. hdl:1885/33076.

=== Books ===
- O'Brien, Terence P.; McCully, M. E. (1969). Plant structure and development; a pictorial and physiological approach. New York: Macmillan. LCCN 69010318. OL 21334951M; viii+114 pages
- O'Brien, T. P.; McCully, M. E. (1981). The study of plant structure : principles and selected methods. Melbourne, Australia: Termarcarphi. ISBN 0959417400. LCCN 82166056. OL 3068414M.
