= Christina "Phazero" Curlee =

Video game designer

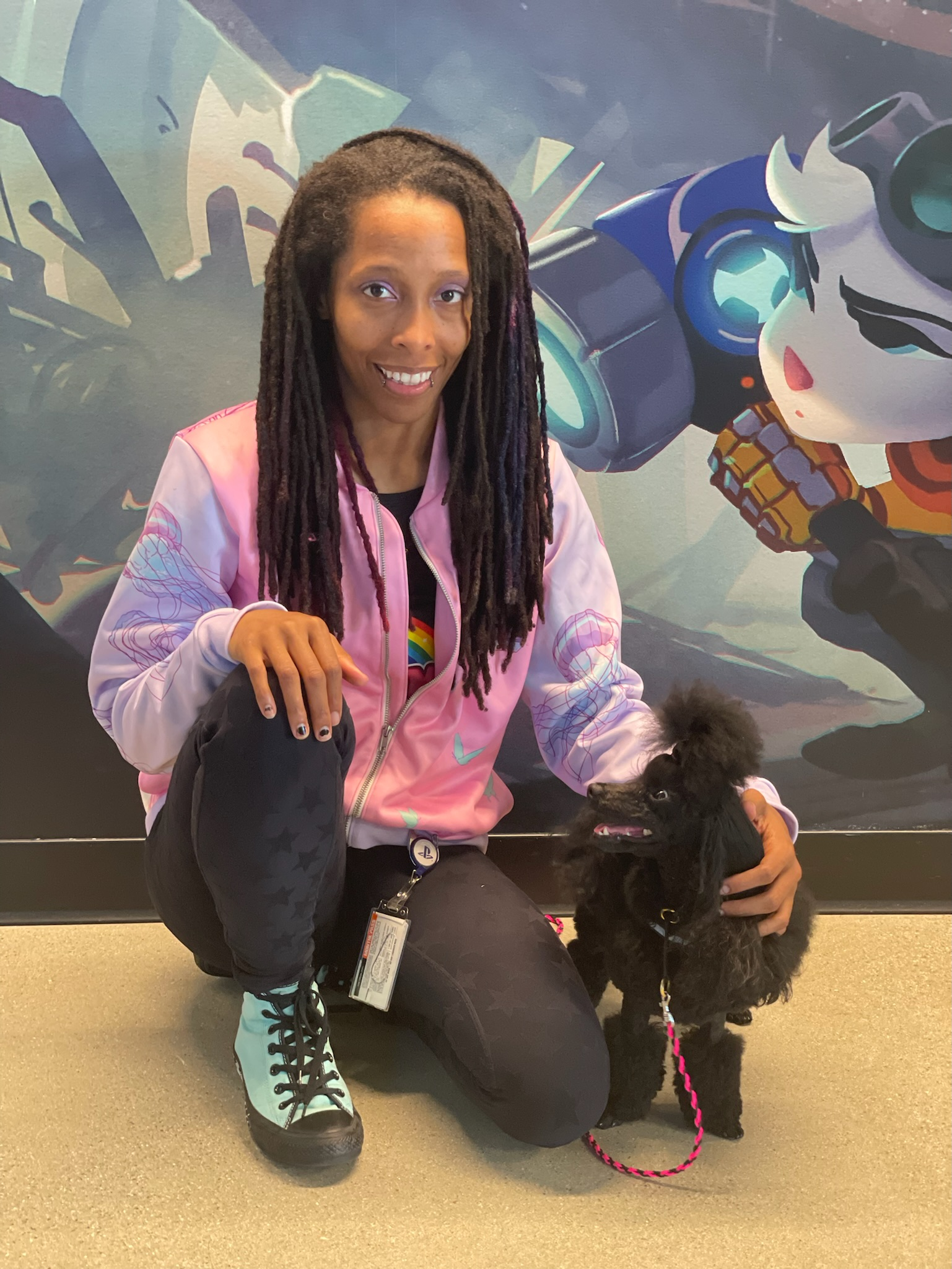

Christina "Phazero" Curlee is a video game designer, video game researcher, and artist. Insomniac Games. She is currently a Mission Designer at Insomniac Games where she worked on Ratchet and Clank: Rift Apart, Spider-Man 2, and Wolverine. Curlee has also written a Master’s thesis entitled “Meaningful Level Design” that is about the connection between level design, gameplay, and emotional engagement.

== Background ==
Christina graduated from the University of Texas at Austin with a BFA in 2016 and the University of California Los Angeles in 2019 with a MFA in Game Design. Curlee’s work has been featured in numerous video game festivals and art exhibits including a solo exhibit with Transfer Gallery, featured at Indie Cade, Gray Area Festival, SAAM, and EYEO. Her solo work has an emphasis on exploring complex topics such as trauma, mental health, healing, reflection, and growth.

== Career ==
Curlee was a 2016 International Game Developers Association Foundation Women in Games Ambassador. In 2018, Curlee's game Artifacts II – Jacaranda was featured in IndieCade. Artifacts is a game experience about childhood neglect, coping, and what it means to be an adult that has learned to live comfortably with trauma. Curlee also created Game Design... The Game (?).

In 2019 was a banner year in Curlee's design career. Upon receiving a Master of Fine Arts in June, in September she joined Insomniac Games as a mission designer for Ratchet and Clank: Rift Apart, and went on to work on Spider-Man 2, and Wolverine. Her most popular work is Mission Design for the spiderbot, Glitch (Rift Apart); Ardolis (Rift Apart); and key Mission Designer for Coney Island in Spider-Man 2. In the fall of 2019, Curlee also accepted an adjunct professor position with the UCLA Department of Design and Architecture. As of 2022, Curlee continues her design work at Insomniac Games, and obtained an assistant professorship at UCLA.
