= Neal Evans =

Canadian businessman

Neal "Curly" Evans (c. 1888–1945) was a freight industry entrepreneur in the Bridge River–Lillooet Country of the Interior of British Columbia, Canada. He acquired a reputation in that region for his enterprise, daring, and personality.

Evans was born in the Dakotas and came to the Cariboo as a boy. His nickname derives from the curly, dark hair of his youth ("a mass of raven locks"), although later in life he was balding. His freighting career spanned the age from jerk line times on the Cariboo Road to bush piloting, instructed by no less than Ginger Coote, who pioneered flying in the Bridge River and Fort St. James areas of BC. Around 1910, Evans was employed by the BC Express Company (formerly Barnard's Express) out of Ashcroft, British Columbia. Like many others in this region, he also became a cowboy and a miner.

As gold extraction began to boom into the Bridge River Goldfields, Evans was one of the many who started freighting operations to supply the mines and prospectors in that area and earned a reputation for reliability in delivering freight despite all obstacles, including floods, mountain slides and blizzards. With the development of a proper road into the Upper Bridge River from Shalalth on Seton Lake, Evans expanded his personal operation into a fleet of trucks and passenger vehicles, eventually becoming the owner of one of the largest transportation firms in the BC Interior, most of its business derived from Bralorne Mine and other Bridge River mining camps, and also from the construction of the Bridge River Power Project. Although never seen to fruition, Evans intended his company to expand into air freight.
