= Loisey-Culey =

- Former commune
- Location of Loisey-Culey
- Location within France Location within Grand Est
- Coordinates: 48°45′57″N 5°17′08″E
- Country: France
- Region: Grand Est
- Department: Meuse
- Arrondissement: Bar-le-Duc
- Canton: Ligny-en-Barrois
- Area^{1}: 24.48 km^{2} (9.45 sq mi)
- Elevation: 203 m (666 ft)
- Highest elevation: 379 m (1,243 ft)
- Lowest elevation: 218 m (715 ft)
- Population (2010): 453
  - Density: 18.5/km^{2} (47.9/sq mi)
- Time zone: UTC+01:00 (CET)
  - Summer (DST): UTC+02:00 (CEST)
- INSEE/Postal code: 55298 /55000
- ^{1} French Land Register data, which excludes lakes, ponds, glaciers > 1 km^{2} (0.386 sq mi or 247 acres) and river estuaries.

Loisey-Culey (French pronunciation: [lwazɛ kylɛ]) is a former commune in the Meuse department in Lorraine in north-eastern France. It was formed in 1973 by the merger of Loisey and Culey, and was disbanded in 2014.

== See also ==
- Communes of the Meuse department
