= Laura Elizabeth McCully =

Canadian feminist and poet

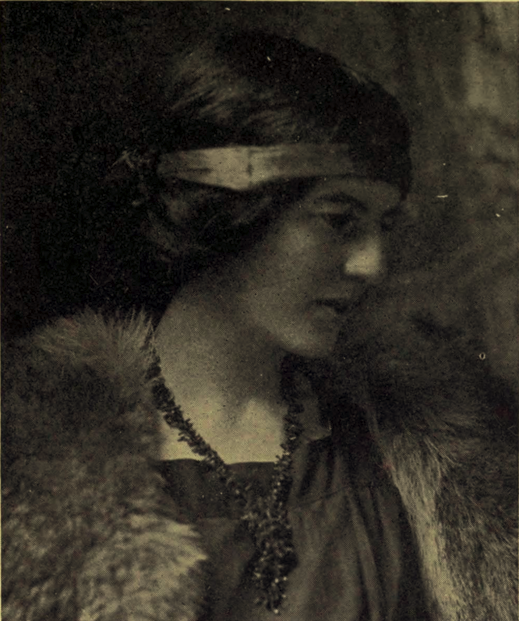
Laura Elizabeth McCully

Laura Elizabeth McCully (17 March 1886 – 7 July 1924) was a first-wave Canadian feminist and a poet, living in Toronto, Ontario, Canada.

== Early life ==
McCully was one of Dr. Samuel Edward McCully and Helen Fitzgibbon's three surviving children, and a great-niece of Jonathan McCully, a Father of Confederation.

As a child, she was a regular poetry and correspondence contributor to the Toronto Daily Mail and Empire section "Children's corner", and in 1899, she was profiled in Harper's Bazaar. She published two volumes of poetry later in life, Mary Magdalene, and other poems (Toronto, 1914) and Bird of dawn, and other lyrics (1919).

== Education ==
An early female university student, McCully received a BA in 1907 from the University of Toronto, and an MA in 1908. The master's looked at the impact of divorce on women and children, and how existing laws favoured men. Dictionary of Canadian Biography has noted her parents' separation in the 1890s as influencing her views. (In 1909, McCully's mother appeared before court to sue her husband, who was living in Dallas, Texas, for bigamy. After deserting the family, he married a woman, and after she died, married another woman.) She received a fellowship from Yale University in 1909 for her thesis on "the ancient Anglo-Saxon language," which the Toronto newspaper World noted was "rarely accorded a woman". She returned home in 1910, without completing the studies. Upon return, she worked for The Sunday World.

== Suffrage ==
McCully's commitment to women's suffrage and feminism developed as an undergraduate. An active member of the Canadian Women's Suffrage Association, her writings included an article in Maclean's in 1912, stating "no human being is complete without the legal status of a citizen."

During the First World War, while many advocated for women to have a role in the war, she looked further, wanting to give women the right to bear arms or at least serve in an auxiliary force. As such, she joined the widely derided Women's Home Guard in 1915, defending the movement in Maclean's the next year. On their first day at Toronto City Hall, McCully said that the club had around 700 recruits. That, despite resigning as the organization's treasurer a year prior, suggesting "Kaiserlike methods" of Miss McNab, the group's president, and in turn being accused of herself wanting "to be like the Kaiser." McNab claimed herself the organization's chief funder to that point, and given the group's infancy, didn't want to "submit to the dictates of the Treasurer." She was employed in munitions work.

== Illness ==
Her public life took a hit in 1916 with a dementia praecox diagnosis, which lead to hospitalizations, a suicide attempt, and eventual poverty. She is said to have studied law during her later years. In the Dictionary of Canadian Biography, Sophia Sperdakos notes that McCully's writings reveal "the vulnerability of women generally, and in particular single women who were leading lives for which precedents and role models were few." After more than a year of hospitalization, she died in July 1924, survived by her mother and a brother. The Globe said "she left a memory that will be treasured for her versatile and sensitive mind, her broad and tender sympathies." Another article in the publication noted that unnamed critics "have declared that Miss McCully's work rivalled that of Pauline Johnson."
