= Curly: An Illustrated Biography of the Superstooge =

- Author: Joan Howard Maurer
- Language: English
- Genre: Biography
- Publisher: Citadel Press
- Publication date: 1985
- Publication place: United States
- Media type: Print (Hardback & Paperback)
- Pages: 224
- ISBN: 0-8065-1086-2
- OCLC: 41236497

Curly: An Illustrated Biography of the Superstooge is a biography of Three Stooges member Curly Howard written by his niece, Joan Howard Maurer.

The book recounts the author's own memories of her uncle, along with interviews with various living relatives, relaying their memories of the comedian. One of the interviews is with Curly's youngest daughter, Janie Hanky. Interviews with his first daughter, Marilyn, and second wife, Elaine, are also included.

Michael Jackson wrote the foreword to the book.
