= Curlew Island (Tasmania) =

Island in Tasmania, Australia

Coordinates: 43°25′S 147°10′E

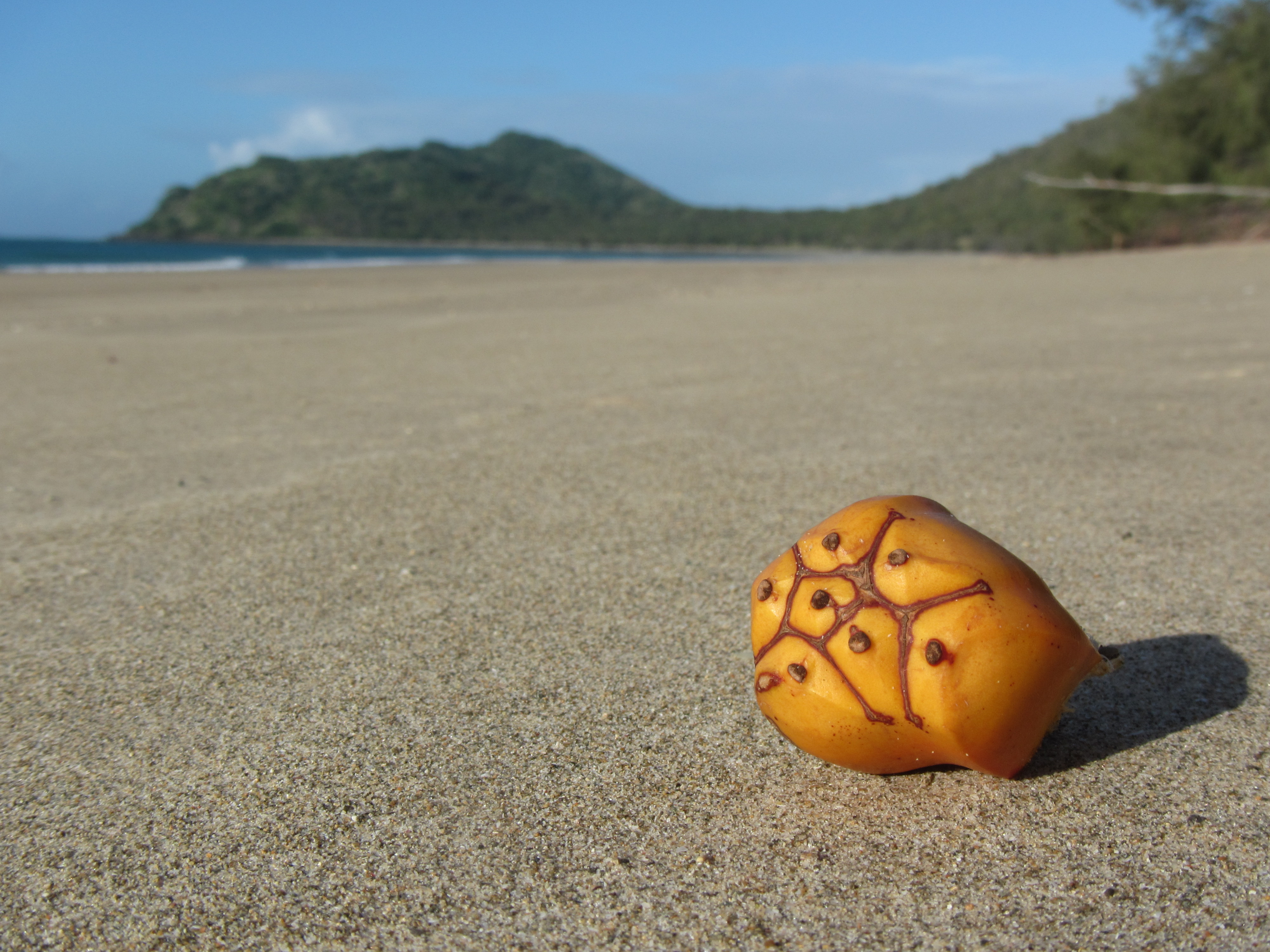
A solitary pandanus seed found on Curlew Island

Curlew Island is a low-lying islet with an area of 0.415 ha in south-eastern Australia. It is part of the Partridge Island Group, lying close to the south-eastern coast of Tasmania, in the D'Entrecasteaux Channel between Bruny Island and the mainland.

== Flora and fauna ==
The vegetation is dominated by introduced grasses. Recorded breeding seabird and wader species are the Pacific gull, kelp gull, sooty oystercatcher, pied oystercatcher and Caspian tern. The metallic skink is also present.
