= Curlee Brown Sr. =

American activist (1909–1976)

- Born: 1909; Hollandale, Mississippi
- Died: November 18, 1976 (aged 66–67)
- Occupation: Activist

Curlee Brown Sr. (born 1909) was an African-American activist who served as the President for the NAACP's Paducah chapter. He is known for launching a legal case that resulted in the integration of what would become the West Kentucky Community and Technical College.

== Early life and education ==
Curlee Brown Sr. was born in 1909 in Hollandale, Mississippi to Dave and Dora Brown. After his parents divorced he moved with his father to Helena, Arkansas and then Paducah, Kentucky, where he stayed for the remainder of his life. Brown Sr. went on to attend the Western Kentucky Industrial College and the Western Kentucky Vocational School, where he studied carpentry and cabinet making.

== Activism ==
In 1940 Brown Sr. became the president of the Paducah NAACP, where he served from 1940 until his death. Curlee valued education alongside equality. He launched a successful lawsuit against West Kentucky Community and Technical College, then known as Paducah Junior College, which resulted in the school's integration. Brown had attempted to enroll in the school for the 1951 fall semester, only to be rejected due to the Day Law, which had been amended in 1950 and prohibited desegregation of any type in schools. The U.S. District Court at Paducah ruled that the college must allow Brown and other black applicants to enroll and the college made an unsuccessful attempt to appeal; eventually the school was integrated. His son would go on to be the first African American to graduate from the college; his daughter would become the second black graduate of the local junior college.

In 1957 he traveled to Detroit, Michigan to hear Martin Luther King Jr. speak on civil right matters, where he met Detroit NAACP head Gloster Current who encouraged him to keep fighting.

== Later life and legacy ==
Brown Sr. was recognized by the Paducah Sun Democrat for his contributions towards non-violent desegregation. He also received awards such as a meritorious certificate for distinguished service and personal contributions of time and effort to the community.

Curlee Brown Sr., died on November 18, 1976.

To honor his legacy the Kentucky NAACP created the Curlee Brown Scholarship and the Paducah branch of the NAACP created the Curlee Brown Award, which they grant to individuals who have made a visible impact in the field of human rights. In 2010 Brown Sr. was inducted into the Kentucky Civil Rights Hall of Fame.
