= Curly Linton =

Personal information
- Full name: Albert Charles Linton
- Born: 5 September 1895; Ulverstone, Tasmania
- Died: 25 July 1985 (aged 89); Melton South, Victoria
- Height: 179 cm (5 ft 10 in)
- Weight: 72 kg (159 lb)

Playing career^{1}
Years	Club	Games (Goals)
1925–27	North Melbourne	30 (2)
- ^{1} Playing statistics correct to the end of 1927.

Albert Charles "Curly" Linton (5 September 1895 – 25 July 1985) was an Anzac veteran and Australian rules footballer who played with North Melbourne in the Victorian Football League (VFL).

A brilliant centreman, he was voted "most popular player" at the club for the 1924 season. Linton was a private in the 31st Infantry Battalion, 5th Division AIF and was twice wounded, once during the Battle of Fromelles and again during the fighting at Polygon Wood during the Third Battle of Ypres.
