= Julia Curlee =

American intelligence agent

- Education: National War College; American University
- Occupations: Former intelligence director Presidential daily briefer Public service fellow Professorial lecturer

Julia Curlee is an American public service fellow who has worked in intelligence analysis and at the White House. She became the first known Central Intelligence Agency (CIA) officer to undergo a gender transition in 2013, while serving as an intelligence officer. A presidential daily briefer primarily to Vice President Mike Pence during the first presidency of Donald Trump, Curlee later served as a United States National Security Council director during the presidency of Joe Biden and the second presidency of Donald Trump. Her federal government roles ended in 2025, amid the persecution of transgender people under the second Trump administration.

== Early life and education ==
Curlee was raised in Hawaii and has said that her grandfather influenced her belief in America's promise of equal opportunity, based on his experience as a member of a U.S. immigrant community. This inspired her to pursue a career in public service despite transphobia in the United States. She earned one master's degree from the National War College and another from American University.

== Career ==
Curlee served the U.S. government under four presidents, traveling to thirty countries and providing intelligence during three wars. Subsequently, as a public service fellow, she has warned of politics undermining U.S. intelligence.

=== Intelligence career and White House appointments ===
Curlee has said she first witnessed politicized intelligence analysis during her Iraq War service with the Defense Intelligence Agency (DIA). In 2007, she joined the CIA, and in 2013, she became the first known intelligence officer to undergo a gender transition while serving at the CIA. During President Donald Trump's first term, in 2017, she was appointed to the National Security Council (NSC). Under the pseudonym Jenny Hall, she wrote an essay about how coming out as transgender made her a more effective CIA officer, published in The Atlantic that year.

In 2019, Curlee was assigned to be a presidential daily briefer and principally briefed Vice President Mike Pence on international and national security matters, though she also briefed the president on Air Force One and supported national security advisors, including H. R. McMaster.

During Joe Biden's presidency and part of Trump's second presidency, Curlee served as a director for intelligence programs on the NSC. She also served in the CIA's China Mission Center, created in 2021 to address national security challenges posed by the Chinese government. Early in Trump's second term, she witnessed changes to the NSC as a policy-coordinating body, including widely reported staff changes over vetting concerns. After far-right influencer Laura Loomer posted on X around March 2025 about a "transgender, Biden holdover who hates President Trump ... still working in the NSC intel office", Curlee was removed from her White House role and, that May, resigned from the CIA.

In summer 2026, Curlee criticized staff cuts across U.S. intelligence and foreign policy agencies, suggesting that they were intended to punish what the administration viewed as the "deep state" or "enemy within" and calling them "performative". She further argued that the administration was scapegoating transgender people as a "small enemy within" to distract from its failures, including in a second Atlantic essay, "The Wrong Kind of American", and said she needed to tell her story "to help fight this caricature".

=== Public-interest and academic roles ===
In 2026, Curlee joined Lawfare, a nonprofit publication covering national security, as a public service fellow, and George Washington University's Elliott School of International Affairs as a professorial lecturer.

== See also ==
- 2025 United States federal mass layoffs
- LGBTQ stereotypes
