= Fiona Culley =

British country music singer-songwriter

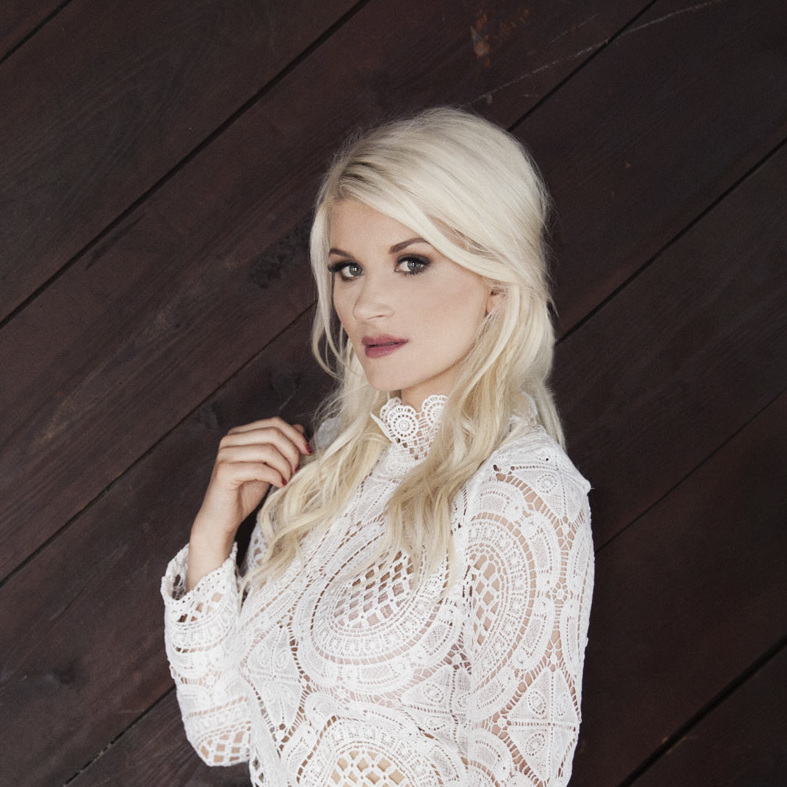

Background information
- Origin: Lichfield, Staffordshire, England
- Genres: Country
- Occupation: Singer-songwriter
- Years active: 2013–present
- Label: Marro Records
- Website: fionaculley.com

Fiona Culley is a British country music singer-songwriter currently residing in Nashville, Tennessee, United States. Culley has released one single, "Anywhere with You", on Marro Records.

== Career ==
Culley met Darius Rucker, frontman of Grammy Award-Winning band Hootie and the Blowfish in a coffee shop in London in 2013. This led her to signing with Marro Records and relocating to Nashville to begin writing and recording music. Fiona became a YouTube sensation when her cover video of Ed Sheeran's "Thinking Out Loud" received over two million views overnight. This led VH1 to name the video one of "5 Amazing Covers of Ed Sheeran's 'Thinking Out Loud.'"

Culley's single "Anywhere With You" was digitally released by Marro Records in March 2016. "Anywhere With You" is co-written and produced with Chris Gelbuda, whose credits include "3am" with Meghan Trainor and "Like I'm Gonna Lose You", featuring John Legend.

Culley co-wrote and recorded a duet with Darius Rucker, "Life on the Line" that is the theme song to a Lionsgate film of the same name starring John Travolta, Sharon Stone, Kate Bosworth and others. Culley also wrote two other songs for the movie's soundtrack.
