= Curlew (steamboat) =

American Civil War freight boat

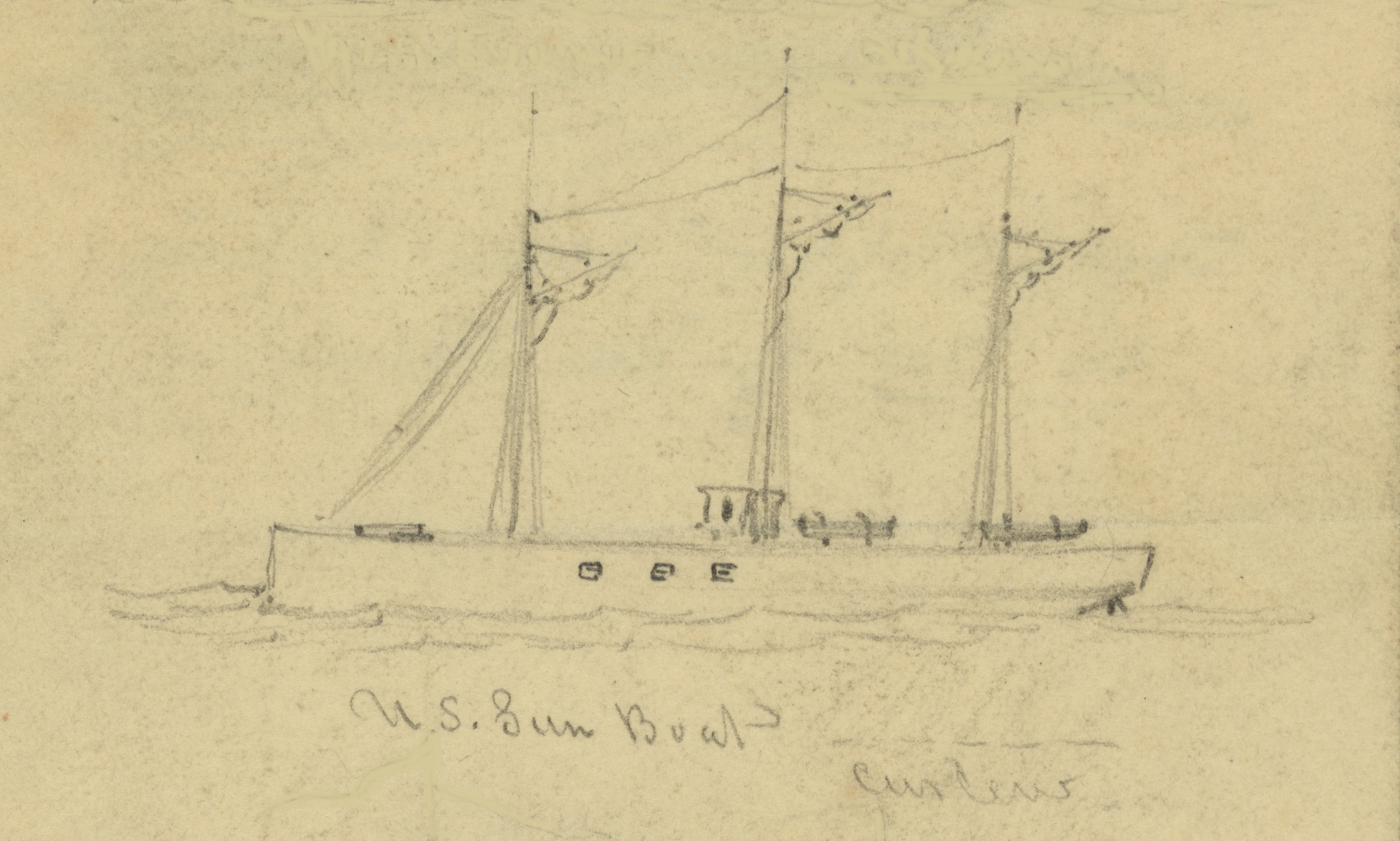
- US gunboat Curlew; from a sketch by A. R. Waud

History

United States
- Name: Curlew
- Owner: Commercial Steamboat Company, Providence Rhode Island, 1856
- Port of registry: Providence, Rhode Island (United States)
- Builder: Samuel Sneden, Greenpoint, New York
- Completed: 1856
- Fate: Sank in the Chesapeake Bay 5 November 1863 after colliding with Louisiana

General characteristics
- Class & type: Propeller steamer
- Tons burthen: 343
- Length: 150 ft (46 m)
- Beam: 28 ft (8.5 m)
- Draft: 8 ft (2.4 m)
- Depth: 8.75 ft (2.67 m)
- Propulsion: Propeller, direct acting vertical engine

Curlew was built in 1856 as a wooden-hulled propeller freight boat for the run between Providence, Rhode Island and New York. She served in several capacities during the American Civil War.

== Merchant service ==
The 150-foot (46 m) wooden propeller steamer Curlew, was built in 1856 by Samuel Sneden of Greenpoint, New York for the Commercial Steamboat Company of Providence, Rhode Island. She was equipped with a direct-acting, two cylinder, vertical engine with a bore of 32 inches (81 cm) and a stroke of 2 feet (61 cm). The boiler was on the main deck. Curlew was rigged as a three-masted schooner as were many of the propeller steamers in this service. She was configured with a full-length spar deck which was enclosed above the main deck.

Curlew sank off of Point Judith, Rhode Island in May 1859 when a steam pipe burst and she began to fill with water. She was salvaged and a new boiler and engine were installed in 1860.

== Civil War service ==
Curlew was purchased for $44,000 by the U.S. Navy in 1861 during the American Civil War for the South Atlantic Blockading Squadron. She was outfitted as a gunboat with armament consisting of a 30-pounder rifled gun on the foredeck and six 32-pounder smoothbores on the main deck. Curlew participated in the expedition to Port Royal, South Carolina under the command of Acting Lieutenant P.G. Watmough. When her machinery proved to be inadequate she was towed to New York by the transport Baltic arriving on 21 November 1861 to be returned to her owners before the sixty-day trial period expired.

Curlew was chartered by the Quartermaster's Department in October 1862 and voyaged as far as New Orleans, Louisiana under Captain H.N. Parrish.

In the panic over the commerce raider CSS Tacony, Curlew was again chartered in June 1863 for use as a gunboat, this time by the Navy Department. She was returned in October of that year.

== Final voyage ==
Back in commercial service Curlew inaugurated a freight service between New York and Baltimore, Maryland. She cleared Baltimore on 5 November 1863 and proceeded down the bay for New York with a full cargo. Near midnight on a dark, cloudy night she collided with the northbound steamer Louisiana near Point Lookout, Maryland hitting Louisiana near midships on the port side. Curlew sank but Captain Parrish and the crew rowed to safety at Point Lookout. Louisiana suffered damage and was towed to Baltimore.

== Notes on tonnage ==
Curlew was listed in the Custom House Register in Providence at 343 49/95 tons burden. The register dimensions shown in the box also result in that number when entered in the contemporary tonnage equation. The New York Marine Register and the succeeding American Lloyds Register both show 380 tons. The Navy appears to quote 380 tons from those registers. In February 1862 the registration was changed to New York and the tonnage remeasured at 557 83/95.

== Other vessels ==
A ferryboat Curlew of 392 tons, which was built in 1853, was purchased by the Quartermaster's Department for use during the Civil War.
