= Curlee =

Curlee may refer to:

- Curlee (name)
- S. D. Curlee, guitar manufacturer
- Curlee House, also known as the Veranda House, historic house in Corinth, Mississippi, U.S.

== See also ==
- Curli
- Curley (disambiguation)
- Curly (disambiguation)
