= USS Polly =

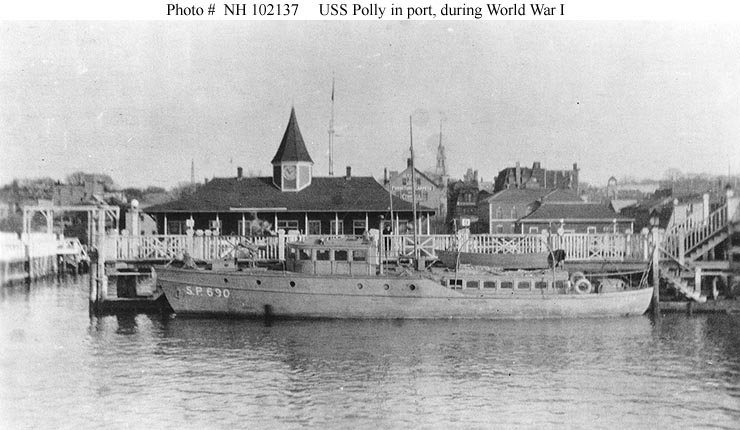
- USS Polly (SP-690) during World War I.

History

United States
- Name: Howmornel; Kakhin IV; Polly
- Owner: Private owners
- Builder: New York Yacht, Launch and Engineering Company, Morris Heights, the Bronx, New York
- Completed: 1909
- Fate: Sold to U.S. Navy 14 May 1917

History

United States NavyUnited States
- Name: USS Polly
- Namesake: Previous name retained
- Acquired: 14 May 1917
- Commissioned: 15 May 1917
- Stricken: 11 March 1919
- Fate: Transferred to U.S. Bureau of Fisheries 9 September 1919

History

U.S. Bureau of Fisheries
- Name: USFS Curlew
- Namesake: Curlew, a bird of the genus Numenius characterized by a long, slender, down-curved bill and mottled brown plumage
- Acquired: 9 September 1919
- Identification: WTFB
- Fate: Retired 1937–1938

General characteristics (as U.S. Navy vessel)
- Type: Patrol vessel
- Tonnage: 28 gross register tons
- Length: 61 ft 9 in (18.82 m)
- Beam: 11 ft (3.4 m)
- Draft: 3 ft (0.91 m)
- Speed: 17 knots
- Complement: 10
- Armament: 1 × 1-pounder gun; 1 × machine gun

USS Polly (SP-690) was a United States Navy patrol vessel in commission from 1917 to 1919. After the conclusion of her Navy career, she operated in the fleet of the United States Bureau of Fisheries as USFS Curlew.

== Construction and early history ==
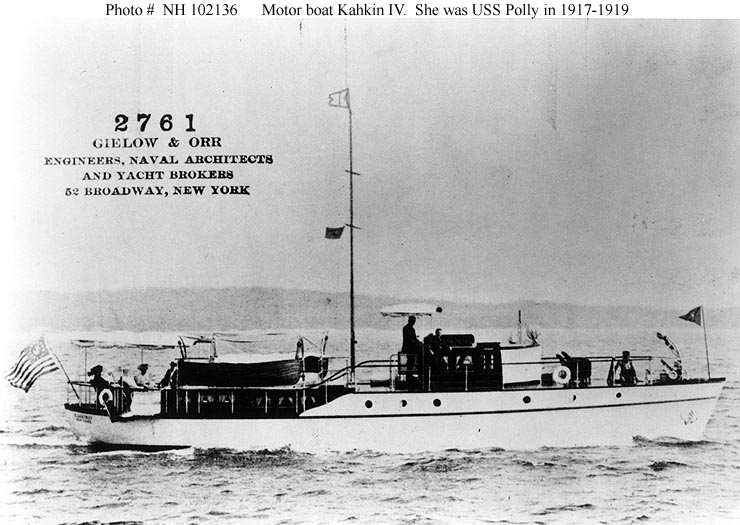
Polly as the private motorboat Kahkin IV sometime between 1909 and 1917.

Polly was built as the private motorboat Howmornel by the New York Yacht, Launch and Engineering Company at Morris Heights in the Bronx, New York, in 1909. She later was renamed Kakhin IV and Polly.

== U.S. Navy ==
On 14 May 1917, the U.S. Navy purchased Polly from William H. Merriman, of New Haven, Connecticut, for use as a section patrol boat during World War I. She was commissioned at Newport, Rhode Island, as USS Polly (SP-690) on 15 May 1917.

Assigned to the 2nd Naval District in southern New England, Polly carried out patrol duties for the rest of World War I.

Polly was stricken from the Navy List on 11 March 1919 and transferred to the United States Bureau of Fisheries on 9 September 1919.

== U.S. Bureau of Fisheries ==
The U.S. Bureau of Fisheries (BOF) renamed the vessel USFS Curlew, and, after modifying her for fisheries duty, assigned her to the BOF station at Cape Vincent, New York, for use in fish-culture work on Lake Ontario.

During the summer of 1922, the Cape Vincent station installed electric lighting aboard Curlew and attached metal plates to the forward part of her hull at the waterline to protect her planking. On 24 September 1923, Curlew rescued 58 passengers from the Canadian steamboat Waubic, which had run aground in fog at Bear Point about 8 nautical miles (15 km; 9.2 mi) from Cape Vincent while making her daily run between Cape Vincent and Kingston, Ontario, Canada. During fiscal year 1928, which ran from 1 July 1927 to 30 June 1928, Curlew underwent extensive repairs and alterations and her original engine was replaced by a diesel engine.

United States Department of Commerce records list Curlew as being in the Bureau of Fisheries fleet as of 30 June 1937 but not as of 30 June 1938, indicating that the Bureau retired her sometime during fiscal year 1938 (1 July 1937–30 June 1938).
