= Hans Schumm =

German–American actor (1896–1990)

Hans Josef Schumm
- Born: April 2, 1896; Stuttgart, German Empire
- Died: February 2, 1990 (aged 93); Los Angeles, U.S.
- Other names: Andre Pola (film pseudonym in 1948, 1949, 1954, and 1956)
- Citizenship: German (1896–1941); U.S. (1941–1990)
- Occupations: Stage and Hollywood film actor
- Years active: 1925–1970
- Employer(s): 20th Century Pictures (2) Charles Chaplin (2); Columbia (13); De Grunwald (2); MGM (9); Monogram (2); Paramount (8); Arnold Pressburger (1) 1st Motion Picture Unit (US Army AF) (1) Republic (3); RKO (6); Samuel Goldwyn (2); Terra-Filmkunst (1); Twentieth Century Fox (8); Universal (6); Revue (Universal) (3); Warner Bros. (13); Ziv Television (1)
- Agent: Paul Kohner Agency
- Style: Character actor
- Height: 6 ft 0 in (183 cm)

Hans Josef Schumm (né Johann Josef Eugen Schumm; 2 April 1896 Stuttgart – 2 February 1990 Los Angeles) was a German-born-turned-American actor, notably, a prolific and critically acclaimed Hollywood screen character actor who appeared in some 95 films – including a co-starring villainous role in a 12-episode serial. He also appeared in 15 TV productions and several stage productions, including one on Broadway. Except for about ten cinema productions, Schumm's body of work in cinema and television was filmed in the United States. On stage and in film, he is credited as Hans Josef Schumm or simply Hans Schumm; but in seven films, he is credited under the pseudonym André Pola — three in 1948, one in 1949, one in 1954, and one 1956. (Note: Disambiguation: Andre Pola (surname also spelled as Polah) (1892–1949) was a Dutch-born violinist who immigrated to America with his Belgian teacher, Eugène Ysaÿe. After concertizing for several years, Polah eventually became head of the violin department at Syracuse University in the late 1920s, conducting the university orchestra as well.) In his private life, he was known as Joseph Schumm and Johann J.E. Schumm.

== Career ==
Schumm was born April 2, 1896, in Stuttgart, Germany. Schumm served in the German Army during World War I.

While living in Stuttgart, Schumm first visited New York as a merchant at age 27, arriving January 1, 1924. There are at least two attributions for his acting debut, one in 1925 in Meissen, Germany, and one around 1925 in Stuttgart, performing in The Merchant of Venice with Staatstheater Stuttgart. Schumm visited New York again, arriving November 30, 1926, and performed with a German stock company in Milwaukee and Chicago.

=== Permanent move to New York ===
Schumm returned a third time to New York, arriving August 26, 1929, to work in German-language theater as a permanent United States resident.

The timing of Schumm's 1929 arrival was 3 years, 5 months before Hitler's seizure of power on January 30, 1933. Germany had been in the throes of severe economic duress from post World War I, which included hyperinflation that began around 1922. His arrival was also sixty-four days after the Great Crash of 1929 on Wall Street. The Great Depression had struck Germany hard in late 1929, and sunk to its trough in early 1932.

Shortly after arriving, until about 1931, Schumm lived at 160 Wadsworth Avenue, Washington Heights, a neighborhood in the most northern part of Manhattan, New York.

=== Move to Hollywood ===
By 1931, Schumm was living in Los Angeles, and appeared in two 1932 productions at the Pasadena Community Playhouse. Schumm debuted in cinema in 1933 as an uncredited bit part actor in The Song of Songs, starring Marlene Dietrich.

=== Die Reichskulturkammer of 1933 ===
Back in Germany, in 1933, by decree of Joseph Goebbels under a newly created agency called Die Reichskulturkammer (DKK), Jewish actors were, among other things, prohibited from performing on German stage. Schumm was not an exile. But he worked within the Hollywood cinema community, particularly German expatriate groups, to help German Jewish exiled actors acclimate in American cinema. In Los Angeles, in 1939, Schumm became one of 60 or more initial members who formed The Continental Players, a short-lived theater company spearheaded by film executives in support of exiled Jewish thespians from Germany and Austria.

=== World War II era ===
Schumm's film roles were mostly minor and, during World War II, mostly uncredited; though he was billed as a main actor on some film posters, including his villainous role as "The Mask" in the popular 1942 12-episode movie serial, Spy Smasher. Generally, the Screen Actors Guild for film, and AFTRA for TV and radio, establishes the guidelines for credits. The lack of crediting can be for several reasons, such as (i) small roles, (ii) non-speaking roles, (iii) brevity, (iv) perceived mismatch between the actor and the role (e.g., a famous actor playing an insignificant part), (v) cameos, (vi) extras, (vii) bit part roles. But also, from 1933 until after World War II, film credits for German-expatriates and German-American actors, particularly in Nazi-themed films, was risky for those who had families in Nazi-occupied countries, not only for Jews, but for anyone with American ties that might draw the attention of the SS. Schumm's paternal and maternal relatives were German citizens and resided there. Schumm became a U.S. naturalized citizen February 14, 1941. When Schumm was drafted under the U.S. Selective Service System, he became a conscientious objector.

In a 2015 retrospective review of Schumm's role as "The Mask" from the 1942 serial Spy Smasher, film critic Boyd P. Magers wrote, "the ultimate screen Nazi was Hans Schumm." An IMDb biographer characterized Schumm as "Nazi swine 'par excellence.'" Magers pointed out that Schumm's career received a considerable boost in the early 1940s when German-born actors were sought, particularly for roles in anti-Nazi films portraying members of the Wehrmacht and SS.

Schumm played a character role in the 1943 film, Hangmen. The film was one of the few attempts by German immigrants in the United States to make a film against the Hitler regime.

=== Post World War II ===
After World War II, Schumm performed a role in a 1952–1953 Broadway play, A Red Rainbow.

==== Germany ====
Following a trend beginning around 1953 for American film producers to shoot in West Germany due to low costs, Schumm traveled to West Germany for work, including roles in:

- The Trapp Family
- The Third Sex (Das dritte Geschlecht) was filmed in Germany in 1957 and released in its original edition in Vienna (Note: Schumm appeared only in the censored version of The Third Sex. The director, Veit Harlan, was roundly criticized by American reviewers for having been anti-Semitic. Moreover, the underlying messages of the film (about homosexuality), were criticized then by major media in the U.S., and over sixty-seven years since its release in North America, has been uniformly debunked. It is not known why the scene with Schumm, as psychologist, was replaced with another actor in the English language version; and it is not known whether Schumm – by participating in the German language version – was sympathetic to the director or the film's message.)
- Tales of the Vikings (39 episodes), produced in Munich by Kirk Douglas, Schumm played Thorvald in two episodes
- Question 7
- The Bashful Elephant
- Come Fly with Me
- Captain Sindbad, shot at Bavaria Film Studios
- The Waltz King (1963)
- Before Winter Comes
- Komm nach Wien, ich zeig dir was! (Come to Vienna, I'll Show You Something!)

The Third Sex was produced in West Germany. It was filmed from May 8 to June 3, 1957, and premiered in Vienna on August 29, 1957, in several cinemas. In Germany, the film was first seen in Stuttgart at the Gloria-Palast (Note: The Stuttgart Gloria-Palast was a single-screen movie theater that opened August 2, 1956.) on October 31, 1957. Schumm played a pediatric psychologist. The film addressed homosexuality, which was controversial at the time. The underlying message, conversion therapy, is on the wrong side of science. Directed by Veit Harlan, the aim was to liberalize public views against homosexuality, and in particular, influence reform of West German laws against it. The film – specifically the version censored by German authorities under Paragraph 175 of the German Criminal Code – had the opposite effect.

==== Hollywood in the 1960s ====
Schumm returned to Hollywood and finished his acting career in 1970.

After shooting Das dritte Geschlecht, Schumm returned to Hollywood and finished his acting career in 1970.

=== Representation and management ===
Schumm was represented by Paul Kohner.

== Family and marriages ==
=== Birth ===
Schumm was born April 2, 1896, in Stuttgart, Germany, to Friedrich Schumm (1855–1904) and Petronella (aka Petrauella) Jehle (maiden, aka Yehle aka Fehle; (Note: With respect to the various spellings of Schumm's mother's maiden name, "Jehle" and "Yehle," the German consonant "J" is almost always pronounced in the same manner as the English "Y." Other possible transliterations include: 1. Eahle; 2. Eali; 3. Eallie; 4. Ealy; 5. Ehle; 6. Ehly; 7. Eiley; 8. Eley; 9. Elley; 10. Ely; 11. Ihle; 12. Ihli; 13. Ihlie; 14. Illi; 15. Jehle; 16. Ohley; 17. Uhl; 18. Uhle; 19. Yaley; 20. Yealy; 21. Yehl; 22. Yehle; 23. Yehley; 24. Yhle; 25. Yhley; 26. Yhly) 1855–1936). He had three siblings – two brothers and a sister. His older brother, Gustav "Gustel" Schumm (de) (1888–1966) had been a star rugby and soccer player, and in 1912, for one year, had served as president of VfB Stuttgart and is credited for developing youth soccer in Germany, before and after World War I.

=== First marriage ===
Schumm first married – on July 29, 1931, in Los Angeles – Agnes Mellen Kent (1888–1975), who from a previous marriage, had two daughters – (i) Jessie Marcellina (Elizabeth) Olivieri (1918–1947) and (ii) Josephine Tarquini (1910–2010), the latter having been adopted after being rescued from the 1915 earthquake in central Italy. Agnes Kent was the daughter of New York architect William Winthrop Kent (1860–1955) – who, as architect, was affiliated at various times with (i) Harvey L. Page, (ii) his brother, Edward Austin Kent (who perished on the Titanic), (iii) Heins & LaFarge, and (iv) Jardine, Kent & Jardine. He was one of the architects of the original plan for Cathedral of St. John the Divine, including the Romanesque Revival apse. Agnes was also the granddaughter of Henry Mellen Kent (1823–1894), one of the founders of the Flint & Kent department store in Buffalo. Hans and Agnes divorced. Agnes had been previously married to Umberto Olivieri (1884–1973), a banker for 14 years at Bank of America in San Francisco, a lawyer in Rome, and a language professor for 30 years at Santa Clara University, who, in 1958, at the age of 74 — after returning to Italy and joining the Order of Saint Benedict at the Subiaco Monastery in Rome — became ordained as a Roman Catholic Priest by the Bishop of Tivoli at Subiaco. Hans Schumm was Agnes' second of three husbands.

=== Second marriage ===
Schumm then married – on September 23, 1935, in Santa Ana, California – Gloria F. Smith (aka Gloria Smith Beery, née Florence W. Smith; 1916–1989). Gloria Schumm filed for divorce late September 1943 in Los Angeles County. (Note: "Divorces Filed," Los Angeles Times, November 2, 1943 (accessible via Newspapers.com at www.newspapers.com/image/380762757, subscription required)) Their divorced became final on December 8, 1944. Gloria and Hans then remarried August 21, 1947, after Gloria realized that she was pregnant from, she claimed, actor Wallace Beery, which Beery denied. (Note: "Links Berry to Physician," Long Beach Independent, April 29, 1948, p. 12 (accessible via Newspapers.com at www.newspapers.com/image/74866244, subscription required)) Gloria gave birth on February 7, 1948, to Johan Richard Wallace Schumm. On February 13, 1948, Gloria Schumm, on behalf of Johan Schumm, as plaintiff, filed a paternity suit against Beery, who, through his lawyer, Norman Ronald Tyre (1910–2002) – Gang, Tyre, Ramer & Brown – initially offered $6,000 as a settlement, but denied being the father.

Gloria Schumm, again, filed for divorced from Hans Schumm on April 2, 1953, in Los Angeles County. Gloria, in her private life, sometimes used Wallace Beery's surname and, as a bit part actor, sometimes used her stage name, Gloria Whitney. (Note: Disambiguation: Gloria Whitney – the stage name for Gloria Schumm – is not the same person as the singer, Gloria Whitney (stage name) (née Florence Joan Healy; 1911–1974), featured on national radio broadcasts and sweet-styled dance orchestras from about 1931 to about 1942.) Gloria, again, divorced Hans Schumm January 11, 1978, in Los Angeles County.

=== United States citizenship ===
Schumm applied to become a naturalized citizen of the United States on November 13, 1940, in Los Angeles, and was admitted as a citizen February 14, 1941. The two affiants attesting to Schumm's identity and residency were Stuttgart-born Alfred Theodor Hummel (1876–1946) and John Harrison Rodney Pain (1884–1966), a British-born American gardner and woodwork artisan. Schumm was approximately 6 feet (1.8 m) tall, weighed approximately 198 pounds (90 kg), and had brown hair and brown eyes — according to his 1942 U.S. draft registration card.

=== Death ===
Schumm died at 93 years and 10 months on February 2, 1990. He was dead on arrival at Kaiser Permanente Hospital in Los Angeles from heart failure after being stricken at the Hollywood nursing home where he had been living. His body was cremated with his ashes buried in the actors' rose garden at Westwood Village Memorial Park Cemetery.

== Links to stills ==
- Three stills from "The Primitive Touch," a TV episode from The Web; CBS/Getty Images, May 14, 1954 New York, New York

Joe Maross, Hans Josef Schumm, and Elizabeth Fraser:

1. Getty image 625765216
2. Getty image 625765116
3. Getty image 625765174
- Two images: April 17, 1952, Johann Schumm – 4 years (child); Gloria Schumm (mother); University of Southern California; OCLC 822257200, 857831052, 663235176

== Profession affiliations ==
- Screen Actors Guild, member
- Screen Extras Guild (between 1946 and 1992, background actors in film and television were largely represented by the Screen Extras Guild. SEG was disbanded on 1 June 1992 and transferred its jurisdiction to SAG)
- Edwin Forrest Society, The Actors Fund, member (estate benefactor)

== Selected cinematic and TV clips ==
- Anders als du und ich (§ 175)

Psychologist (Hans Schumm), Christa Teichmann, Klaus' mother (Paula Wessely), Werner Teichmann, Klaus' father (Paul Dahlke)
Scene: "Cure for Homosexuality," Klause's parents with the psychologist (German censored version with English subtitles)

- Casbah

Anton Duval (Houseley Stevenson), Willem (Hans Schumm as Andre Pola), Pepe (Tony Martin)
Scene

- Spy Smasher on YouTube (all 12 chapters)

== Filmography ==
Year	Film	Director	Role	Production Co.
1933	Song of Songs, The	Rouben Mamoulian	Man at Berlin railway station (uncredited)	Paramount
1934	The Countess of Monte Cristo	Karl Freund	Police detective (uncredited)	Universal
1934	One Night of Love	Victor Schertzinger	Policeman (uncredited)	Columbia
1935	Folies Bergère de Paris	Roy Del Ruth	Bartender (uncredited)	20th Century Pictures
1936	Invisible Ray, The	Lambert Hillyer	Clinic valet (uncredited)	Universal
1936	Under Two Flags	Frank Lloyd	Cast member (uncredited)	20th Century Pictures
1936	Revolt of the Zombies	Victor Hugo Halperin	German Soldier (uncredited)	Victor & Edward Halperin Productions
1937	Round-Up Time in Texas	Joseph Kane	Dunbar stable man (uncredited)	Republic
1939	Confessions of a Nazi Spy	Anatole Litvak	Bismarck officer with crew list (uncredited)	Warner Bros.
1939	Bridal Suite aka Maiden Voyage	Wilhelm Thiele	Man in shipboard brawl (uncredited)	Metro-Goldwyn-Mayer
1939	Thunder Afloat	George B. Seitz	German sailor looking for wireless	Metro-Goldwyn-Mayer
1939	Espionage Agent	Lloyd Bacon	Foreign official (uncredited)	Warner Bros.
1939	Escape, The	Ricardo Cortez	Policeman	Twentieth Century Fox
1939	Hitler – Beast of Berlin	Sherman Scott	Schaefer	Producers Pictures
1939	Scandal Sheet	Nick Grinde	Dorgas	Columbia
1939	Amazing Mr. Williams, The	Alexander Hall	Pedestrian	Columbia
1940	Calling Philo Vance	William Clemens	Nazi officer from ship at dock (uncredited)	Warner Bros.
1940	British Intelligence	Terry O. Morse	German senior officer (uncredited)	Warner Bros.
1940	Escape to Glory	John Brahm	Submarine commander	Columbia
1940	Women in War	John H. Auer	German Soldier (uncredited)	Republic
1940	Four Sons	Archie Mayo	Müller	Twentieth Century Fox
1940	Man I Married, The	Irving Pichel	1^{st} storm trooper (uncredited)	Charles Chaplin Productions
1940	Mystery Sea Raider	Edward Dmytryk	Sentry (uncredited)	Paramount
1940	The Great Dictator	Charles Chaplin	Soldier (uncredited)	Charles Chaplin Productions
1940	Moon Over Burma	Louis King	Baumgarten	Paramount
1941	So Ends Our Night	John Cromwell	Kobel	David L. Loew & Albert Lewin
1941	They Dare Not Love	James Whale	Bruckner (uncredited)	Columbia
1941	Underground	Vincent Sherman	Heller's aide	Warner Bros.
1941	Down in San Diego	Robert B. Sinclair (fr)	Müller (uncredited)	Metro-Goldwyn-Mayer
1941	A Yank in the R.A.F.	Henry King	German officer (uncredited)	Twentieth Century Fox
1942	Lady Has Plans, The	Sidney Lanfield	1^{st} German	Paramount
1942	Underground Agent	Michael Gordon	Hans (uncredited)	Columbia
1942	Atlantic Convoy	Lew Landers	Commander von Smith	Columbia
1942	The Devil with Hitler	Gordon Douglas	Gestapo guard (uncredited)	Hal Roach Studios
1942	Destination Unknown	Ray Taylor	Müller (uncredited)	Universal
1942	To Be or Not to Be	Ernst Lubitsch	Special Investigations Squad (uncredited)	Romaine Film Corporation
1942	Invisible Agent	Edwin L. Marin	SS man	Frank Lloyd Productions
1942	Foreign Agent	William Beaudine	Dr. Werner	Monogram Pictures
1942	Navy Comes Through, The	A. Edward Sutherland	U-51 submarine captain recognizing Kroner (uncredited)	RKO Radio Pictures
1942	Once Upon a Honeymoon	Leo McCarey; James Anderson (asst.)	Storm trooper	RKO Radio Pictures
1942	Spy Smasher (3:33:46) (12-episode movie serial): 1. "America Beware" (0:28:32); 2. "Human Target" (0:17:29); 3. "Iron Coffin" (0:16:48); 4. "Stratosphere Invaders" (0:16:50); 5. "Descending Doom" (0:16:48); 6. "The Invisible Witness" (0:16:39); 7. "Secret Weapon" (0:16:53); 8. "Sea Raiders" (0:16:45); 9. "Highway Racketeers" (0:16:41); 10. "2700° Fahrenheit" (0:16:56); 11. "Hero's Death" (0:16:45); 12. "V ... _" (0:16:40)	William Witney	The Mask (head of the Nazi spy ring operating from a U-78 submarine)	Republic
1942	Pardon My Sarong	Erle C. Kenton	Moss, Tabor's henchman	Mayfair Productions (Jules Levey)
1942	All Through the Night	Vincent Sherman	Anton	Warner Bros.
1942	Desperate Journey	Raoul Walsh	Gestapo agent (uncredited)	Warner Bros.
1942	Berlin Correspondent	Eugene Forde	Gunther	Twentieth Century Fox
1943	Sahara	Zoltán Korda	Sgt. Krause	Universal
1943	Strange Death of Adolf Hitler, The	James P. Hogan	Maj. Profe	Universal
1943	Hitler's Madman (aka Hitler's Hangman)	Douglas Sirk	Müller (Gestapo officer: Heydrich's gunman) (uncredited)	Angelus Productions (Aimee Semple McPherson); Producers Releasing Corporation
1943	Mission to Moscow	Michael Curtiz	Uniformed guard	Warner Bros.
1943	Action in the North Atlantic	Lloyd Bacon	Lieutenant Commander	Warner Bros.
1943	Around the World (B movie)	Allan Dwan	Nazi	RKO Radio Pictures
1943	Margin for Error (uncredited)	Otto Preminger	Karl Müller (uncredited)	Twentieth Century Fox
1943	Moon Is Down, The	Irving Pichel	Capt. Bentick	Twentieth Century Fox
1943	Bomber's Moon	Edward Ludwig; Harold D. Schuster	German soldier	Twentieth Century Fox
1943	Chetniks! The Fighting Guerrillas	Louis King	Sentry	Twentieth Century Fox
1943	Journey into Fear	Norman Foster; Orson Welles (uncredited)	Driver (uncredited)	RKO Radio Pictures
1943	Above Suspicion	Richard Thorpe	Guard	Metro-Goldwyn-Mayer
1943	Assignment in Brittany	Jack Conway	Nazi torturer (uncredited)	Metro-Goldwyn-Mayer
1943	They Got Me Covered	David Butler	Schmidt	Samuel Goldwyn Company
1943	This Land is Mine	Jean Renoir	German sergeant who pushes Albert	Jean Renoir-Dudley Nichols Production; RKO Radio Pictures
1943	Hangmen Also Die!	Fritz Lang	Sergeant (uncredited)	Arnold Pressburger Films
1944	Uncertain Glory	Raoul Walsh	Gestapo agent	Warner Bros.
1944	Up in Arms	Elliott Nugent	Nazi spy in theatre lobby	Samuel Goldwyn Company
1944	Passport to Destiny (aka Passport to Adventure)	Ray McCarey	Miniger, Dietrich's Aide	RKO Radio Pictures
1944	Voice in the Wind	Arthur Ripley	Piesecke	Ripley – Monter Productions
1944	Resisting Enemy Interrogation	Bernard Vorhaus	German guard (uncredited)	First Motion Picture Unit, Army Air Forces
1945	Escape in the Desert	Edward Abraham Blatt (1903–1991)	Klaus	Warner Bros.
1945	Son of Lassie	S. Sylvan Simon	German commander (uncredited)	Metro-Goldwyn-Mayer
1946	Cloak and Dagger	Fritz Lang	German agent	Warner Bros. – United States Pictures
1947	Golden Earrings	Mitchell Leisen	Policeman	Paramount
1947	Beginning or the End, The	Norman Taurog	Nazi police officer	Metro-Goldwyn-Mayer
1947	Desire Me	Jack Conway (uncredited); George Cukor (uncredited); Mervyn LeRoy (uncredited); Victor Saville (uncredited)	German voice (1 of 3)	Metro-Goldwyn-Mayer
1948	Billie Gets Her Man	Edward Bernds	Surgeon (as Andre Pola)	Columbia
1948	Smugglers' Cove	William Beaudine	Karl (as Andre Pola)	Monogram Pictures
1948	Casbah	John Berry	Willem (as Andre Pola)	Marston Productions (Tony Martin)
1949	Act of Violence	Fred Zinnemann	German voice (1 of 3) (as André Pola)	Metro-Goldwyn-Mayer
1949	The Lovable Cheat	Richard Oswald	Policeman (as Andre Pola)	Skyline Pictures
1949	Fuelin' Around (Three Stooges short) (video clip)	Edward Bernds	Col. Cluttz (as Andre Pola)	Columbia
1949	Waiting in the Lurch (Three Stooges short)	Edward Bernds	Dr. Emil Gesundheit (as Andre Pola)	Columbia
1951	Target Unknown	George Sherman	Road guard	Universal
1951	I Was a Communist for the FBI	Gordon Douglas	Rader (uncredited)	Warner Bros.
1953	Stars Are Singing, The	Norman Taurog	Secretary to Ladowski	Paramount
1953	No Escape	Charles Bennett	Mr. Vladimir Platoff	Matthugh Productions (Matt Freed né Matthew J. Freed; 1909–2003; Hugh MacKenzie)
1954	The Fire Chaser (Three Stooges short)	Jules White	Dr. Emil Gesundheit (as Andre Pola) (archive footage) (uncredited)	Columbia
1956	Hot Stuff (Three Stooges short)	Jules White	Col. Klotz (as Andre Pola)	Columbia
1956	The Trapp Family (in German)	Wolfgang Liebeneiner	Petroff	Divina-Film (Ilse Kubaschewski)
1957	Das dritte Geschlecht (The Third Sex) (original) (Premiered 29 August 1957 Vienna) (based on a script by Felix Lützkendorf; 1906–1990)	Veit Harlan	(the scene with the youth psychologist in the original uncut version was played by another actor, uncredited)	Helmuth Volmer Production (de); Arca-Filmproduktion GmbH (Gero Wecker)
1957	Anders als du und ich (§ 175) (Different from You and Me) (censored version of Das dritte Geschlecht per FSK) (Premiered 31 October 1957 Stuttgart)	Veit Harlan (Hans Giese (de), scientific advisor)	Youth psychologist (played by Schumm)	Helmuth Volmer Production (de); Arca-Filmproduktion GmbH (Gero Wecker)
1959	The Third Sex (American release) (also released as Bewildered Youth)	Veit Harlan (Frank Winterstein, assistant director, is credited as director on the D-F Distributing Corp. release in America)	(the scene with the youth psychologist was played by another actor, uncredited, in the English language release)	Arca-Filmproduktion GmbH (Gero Wecker) (U.S. distributor: D-F Distributing Corp.) (Note: D-F Distributing Corp. was headed by David Dietz. The Third Sex is the only known film distributed by the firm. David Dietz, however, also, with William H. Horne, distributed (i) Assassin for Hire, (ii) Louisiana Story, and (iii) Magie Africaine.)
1959	I Aim at the Stars	J. Lee Thompson	Baron von Braun (uncredited)	Morningside Productions / Fama-Film
1961	Question 7	J. Lee Thompson		RD-DR Corporation (Louis de Rochemont); Lutheran Film Associates (Robert E. A. Lee); Matthias-Film (de)
1962	The Bashful Elephant	Dorrell McGowan (fr) & Stuart McGowan (fr)	Fritz	McGowan International, Inc. (Dorrell (fr) & Stuart McGowan (fr)) (filmed in Austria)
1963	Come Fly with Me	Henry Levin	Viennese gardner (uncredited)	De Grumwald Productions
1963	Captain Sindbad	Byron Haskin		King Brothers Productions
1969	Before Winter Comes	J. Lee Thompson	Camp doctor	Columbia
1970	Komm nach Wien, ich zeig dir was! (Come to Vienna, I'll Show You Something!) (in German)	Rolf Thiele	(uncredited)	Terra-Filmkunst; Vienna-Filmproduktion GmbH

== Television ==
Series	Season : Episode	Episode Title	Writer(s)	Director	Role	Original air date	Network	Production Co.
Space Patrol	1 : 37	"Photograph of a Traitor"	Norman Jolley (1916–2002)	Dick Darley (1923–2016)	Brewer	August 8, 1951	ABC	American Broadcasting Company; Tower Productions
Dick Tracy (fr) (1950–1952)	2 : 6; 2 : 7	"Dick Tracy and Pruneface:" Part 1 "Dick Tracy and Pruneface:" Part 2	Robert Leslie Bellem (story suggested by); Chester Gould (comic strip characters); William Lively (1907–1973) (story suggested by); William Lively (1907–1973) (teleplay)	Thomas Carr		October 24, 1951; October 31, 1951		P.K. Palmer; Herbert Moulton
The Unexpected (aka Time Square Playhouse)		"Merry-Go-Round"	Jerome Lawrence; Robert E. Lee	Sobey Martin		June 20, 1952		Ziv Television Programs
Chevron Theatre	1 : 33	"Mightier Than the Sword"	Arthur Weiss	Richard Irving (1917–1990)		August 29, 1952		MCA TV/Revue Productions
Biff Baker, U.S.A.	1 : 15	"Flight to Geneva"	Barry Shipman; Fenton Earnshaw (1912–1970); Howard J. Green (1893–1965); Jerome Gary; Lawrence Kimble	Herschel Daugherty; John English; Richard Irving (1917–1990)	Rozan	February 12, 1953	CBS	Revue Productions
The Ray Milland Show	1 : 5	"The Faculty Dance"	Joe Connelly; Bob Mosher (1915–1972)	Charles Barton		October 15, 1953	CBS	Revue Productions
Kraft Television Theatre	7 : 25	"The Cuckoo Clock"	Gerald Savory		German piano teacher (Note: "On television: Ray Millard Turns to Comedy" ("The Cuckoo Clock," reviewed) by Evelyn Jones (1929–2014), Boston Herald, February 19, 1954, pg. 43)	February 17, 1954	NBC	J. Walter Thompson
The Web	4 : 33	"The Primitive Touch"			Art dealer	May 23, 1954	CBS	Mark Goodson; Bill Todman
The Phil Silvers Show	5 : 5	"A.W.O.L."	Nat Hiken, Terry Ryan, Barry Blitzer	Albert De Caprio (1916–2000)	Janos Varga (Hungarian father of Imre, who is about to marry Martha)	October 18, 1955	CBS	CBS
Rheingold Theatre	5 : 9	"Rendezvous at Dawn"	Charles Early; Joseph Early	Arthur Crabtree	Sabolek	November 19, 1956	NBC	Douglas Fairbanks, Jr., Productions
Tales of the Vikings	1 : 2; 1 : 25	"The Black Stone" "Blood Sacrifice"	Robert "Bob" Mitchell (1918–1992) (original story); Sidney Morse (1920–2003) (original story); Robert "Bob" Mitchell (1918–1992) (teleplay)	George M. Cahan (1919–1991)	Thorvald	September 15, 1959; February 23, 1960	United Artists Television (syndicated)	Brynaprod (produced in Munich by Kirk Douglas)
Walt Disney's Wonderful World of Color	10 : 5; 10 : 6	"The Waltz King" Part I "The Waltz King" Part II	Maurice Tombragel (fr) (script); Fritz Eckhardt (original story)	Steve Previn	Ferdinand Dommayer (de)	October 27, 1963; November 3, 1963	NBC	Walt Disney Productions

== Stage ==
Dates	Play	Writer(s)	Director	Role	Theater
Around 1925	The Merchant of Venice			("Hans Schumm, formerly of the Stuttgart State Theatre Company")	Stuttgart State Theatre Company
1926	(The German Stock Company)			("Hans Schumm, formerly of the Stuttgart State Theatre Company")	Pabst Theater, Milwaukee; Chicago
November 14, 1930	Doctor Klaus (comedy)	Herma Kristof-Stock	Bert Sprotte		Ebell Wilshire Theater; Los Angeles; Second event of the German Theater Season
	Cast: Bert Sprotte (title role), Eva Leoni, Edith Wolf-Kopelson, Conrad Seidemann, Hans Joseph Schumm, Johanna Hagen, Charlotte Foerstel, Kurt Herrnfeld, Costea Mooth, Otto Kottka, Elizabeth Siegel				
January 7 – 16, 1932	Berkeley Square (comedy, romance)	John L. Balderston	Gilmore Brown (1886–1960)	("Hans Schumm, formerly of the Stuttgart State Theatre Company")	Pasadena Community Playhouse (Note: "Gilmore Brown Offers 'Berkeley Square' as First 1932 Production," The SaMoJaC (The Corsair), Vol. 3, No 16, January 13, 1932, p. 2)
January 21 – 30, 1932	Once in a Lifetime	Moss Hart; George S. Kaufman	Gilmore Brown (1886–1960)		Pasadena Community Playhouse
May 25 – June 12, 1939	William Tell	Adaptation of Friedrich Schiller's 1804 original (two acts and ten scenes)	Leopold Jessner		El Capitan Theatre; Hollywood; The Continental Players
	Cast: Louis Adlon; Siegfried Arno (Stuessi); Lutz Altschul (Rösselmann); Norbert J. Kobler (1916–2003), son of German actor and director, Julius Kobler (de); Ernst Lenart (de); Sigmund Nunberg (de); Friedrich Mellinger; Ernst Deutsch (the dictator); Leo Reuss (aka Lionel Royce) (William Tell); Norbert Schiller (de), great-great-great nephew of the playwright (Note: "Refugees to Act Here – Stage Stars Forced to Leave Nazi Areas Aided by Film Men," Los Angeles Times, May 1, 1939, Part 2, p. 3 (accessible via Newspapers.com at www.newspapers.com/image/160145814)) (Baumgarten); Gerhard Schaefer (Arnold von Melchtal); Hans Schumm; Walter O. Stahl (de); Rudolf Steinbock (de); Christiane Grautoff (de) (Ernst Toller's wife) (Hedwig, Tell's wife); Eva Hyde (aka Heyde; née Heymann; 1910–1955) (Note: Eva Hyde (née Eva Heymann; 1910–1953), an actress, was the third wife of composer Werner R. Heymann, her first husband whom she divorced. In 1952, she married artist Klaus Brill (1913–2007). She was a distant cousin of Werner Heymann.) (Armgard); Hermine Sterler (Gertrude Stauffacher); Alexander Granach (Stauffacher); Bobby Moya (young Tell).				
	Leopold Jessner, director; Ralph Freed, text; Rudi Feld, art director (costumes and set design); Ernst Toch, music score; Ingolf Dahl, conductor; Simon Mitchneck, Phd (1893–1986), English and voice coach (linguist).				
January 31, 1949	Totentanz (Dance of Death)	August Strindberg		Kurt	New Studio Theater; 1743 North New Hampshire Boulevard; Los Angeles (capacity 205)
	Cast included Walter Wicclair (de) as the captain and Efriede Borodin (de) as Alice.				
September 22, 23, 24, 1949	Faust (in German)	Goethe	Walter Wicclair (de)	Assistant Director	University of Southern California; Department of German
	Cast included Norbert Schiller (de) as Faust, Walter Wicclair (de) as Mephistopheles, Laura McCann (de) as Gretchen, Else Baeck-Neft (de) as Martha, and Franz Roeh as Wagner, Marcel Lerner as the student. Others in the cast included Otto Waldis (de), Sigurd Bernau, L.H. Lasch, and Renee Henning.				
March 16, 1949 (premier)	Intimitaeten (Private Lives)	Noël Coward		Bennet Chase	Coronet Theater; 366 North La Cienega Boulevard; Los Angeles (capacity 275) (guest performances were also give in San Francisco with the same cast)
	Kitty Mattern (de) playing Helen Prynne co-starred with Hans Schumm playing Bennet Chase. In a love scene, Mattern and Schumm reportedly drove realism to an intensity that was unusual for the era. Others in the cast included Norbert J. Kobler playing Victor Prynne, Inga Grothe playing Sybile Chase				
November 1949 source	Raub der Sabinerinnen (de) (Rape of the Sabine Women)	Paul and Franz Schönthan (de)			Coronet Theater
	Cast included Else Baeck-Neft (de) as Rosa, Efriede Borodin (de) as Marianne, Walter Wicclair (de) as Professor Gallwitz, and Hans Schumm as Dr. Neumeister.				
June 1951	The Swallow's Nest	Zoë Akins	Robert Milton		Pasadena Community Playhouse
	Cast included Billie Burke, Marjorie Steele (1930–1988) (Mrs. Huntington Hartford in her acting debut), Onslow Stevens, George Phelps, Lumsden Hare, Roy Gordon (1884–1972).				
May 5 – 23, 1952 (premiere)	The Red Rainbow	Myron C. Fagan	Myron C. Fagan	Boris Sarno, the producer (a thick accented nemesis of the character J. Kerrigan Kane)	Beaux Arts Theater; Westlake; West 8th Street and Beacon Avenue
Opened January 14, 1953	The Road to Rome	Robert E. Sherwood (rewritten by Preston Sturges)	Eddie Firestone		The Players (Sturges's dinner theater in Hollywood)
	Cast: Carolyn Jones (Amytis, Grecian wife of the Roman dictator), Robin Hughes (Hannibal), Richard Hale (Hasdrubal), Mike Freeman (Maharbal), Clayton Cole (Hannibal's brother), Nico Lek (1901–1983) (Fabius, the dictator), Margaret Brewster (Fabius' mother), Pat Golden (the sergeant), Keith McConnell (Scripio), Taylor Flanikan (slave), Francesca Leland (slave)				
September 14 – 26, 1953	The Red Rainbow	Myron C. Fagan	Myron C. Fagan	Boris Sarno, the producer	Royal Theatre; Broadway; New York
	The play is a murder-mystery involving the infiltration of communism in American life (see Red-baiting and McCarthyism). The production was partly financed by the Cinema Education Guild of Hollywood, Inc., which has been chronicled as a notoriously ill-fated McCarthyistic organization founded and headed by Myron C. Fagan (president). His son, executive producer of the play, Bruce Vincent Fagan (1918–2001) was the organization's secretary. (Note: "Red Rainbow Opens Tonight" (preview article), by Sam Zolotow, New York Times, September 14, 1953, p. L24, col 1 (timesmachine.nytimes.com/timesmachine/1953/09/14/83854295.html, subscription required)) Schumm's 1953 affiliation with Fagan notwithstanding, it is not known whether he seriously shared Fagan's views given that he went on to work with actors, directors, and producers who Fagan later infamously named before a stage audience, and on radio, 300 Hollywood stars that he claimed were communists. (FBI file)				

== Radio ==
Dates	Play	Writer(s)	Director	Role	Network
1955	Radio Play: "Hier geschieht ja doch nichts" (adaptation from "Mr. Higginbotham's Catastrophe," from Twice-Told Tales)	Nathaniel Hawthorne	Paul Land (host at Radio Stuttgart, Süddeutscher Rundfunk, since the late 1930s)	Neger Josua	Süddeutscher Rundfunk (SDR) (Stuttgart)
	Cast: Karin Schlemmer (de) (Helen Longfield), Thomas Flemming (Dominic Pike), Albert Florath (Thompson), Willi Reichmann (Babbler), Kurt Haars (Bullock), Walter Thurau (Davies), Trude Tandar (Mrs. Luly), Hans Mahnke (de) (Der hinkende Sam), Hans Josef Schumm (Josua)				

== Notes and references ==
=== General resources ===
- Marta Mierendorff papers 0214 "Schumm, Hans," Box 12, Folder 22, University of Southern California (USC), Feuchtwanger Memorial Library; OCLC 709903745

Marta Mierendorff, PhD — a German-born scholar who, in the latter 1960s, became a faculty member at USC — was a pioneer in the study of exiles. Schumm was not an exile, but, the papers include information on Schumm

- Paul Kohner Agency records, Goose Step, Oscars collections, Margaret Herrick Library
- Deutsches Bühnen-Jahrbuch; Theatergeschichtliches Jahr- und Adressbuch, Berlin: F.A. Günther & Sohn Actien-Gesellschaft, Vol. 42 (1931); OCLC 639875731, 470143388, 637405642; OCLC 496648424, 297250845
- "Arbeitsausschüsse der Fachschaft Bühne," Archived 2018-05-26 at the Wayback Machine Die Bühne (Redakteur: Dr. Hans Knudsen), 2 Jahrgang, heft 1, 1. Januar 1936, seit 22; OCLC 1019938629

O – Obmann; St – Obmann Stellvertreter; S – Schriftführer; K – Kassenwart; Vd – Vertrauens -dame; B – Beisitzer; FV – Fachgruppenvertreter.
Bamberg Stadttheater: Walter Storm (O), Fritz Milter (St), Hans Schumm (S), Karl Frank (K), Ria Mardeck (Vd).

- Koegel, John, PhD (born 1956) (2009). Music in German Immigrant Theater: New York City, 1840-1940. University of Rochester Press. Retrieved May 25, 2018. Koegel, as of 2018, is Professor of Musicology at California State University, Fullerton. LCCN 2009-6777; OCLC 488494395 (all editions).
1. Koegel – via Google Books.
2. Koegel – via Internet Archive. 2009. ISBN 9781580462150.

See inline citation 21 for Chapter 5 on p. 504. → Ulrich, Paul Stanley (1997). Biographisches Verzeichnis für Theater, Tanz und Musik [Biographical Index for Theater, Dance and Music: Directory of German-Language Reference Works and Yearbooks]. Berlin Verlag Arno Spitz GmbH (de). ISBN 387061479X ISBN 3-8706-1673-3, 978-3-8706-1479-9; ISBN 978-3-8706-1673-1; OCLC 444440441 (all editions).

Vol. 1: A–L
Vol. 2: M-Z
