= Louis V. Arco =

Austrian actor (1899–1975)

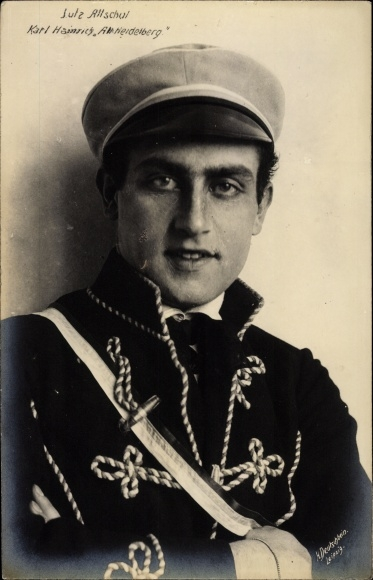
- Arco in a c. 1920 stage production of Old Heidelberg in Leipzig
- Born: Lutz Altschul; 24 July 1899; Baden bei Wien, Austria-Hungary
- Died: 3 April 1975 (aged 75); Zürich, Switzerland
- Occupation: Actor
- Years active: 1919–1972

Louis V. Arco (born Lutz Altschul; 24 July 1899 – 3 April 1975) was an Austrian stage and film actor whose career began in the late 1910s.

== Early life and career ==
Louis V. Arco was born in Baden, Austria-Hungary (now Austria), about 8 kilometers (5 miles) south of Vienna. He made his stage debut in Leipzig in 1919. His first film was the German silent movie Lilly Humbrecht, der Leidensweg einer Stieftochter in 1922. This was followed by The Love of a Queen in 1923. In 1929, he appeared in his last silent movie Napoleon at Saint Helena about Napoleon's last days. This movie was directed by Lupu Pick, who loved making silent movies so much that he could not handle the switch to talkies and ended up poisoning himself in Berlin in 1931.

His first talkie was the film Love's Carnival in 1930. The following year, he appeared in Yorck (about the life of the Prussian general Ludwig Yorck von Wartenburg who fought against Napoleon). In 1932, Altschul appeared in his last German movie, The Black Hussar starring Conrad Veidt. After the Nazis came to power in Germany in 1933, Altschul went home to Austria.

== Career during World War II ==
After Hitler's forces took over Austria in the Anschluss of 1938, Altschul came to America and changed his name to Louis V. Arco. His first movie in America was the 1939 war drama Nurse Edith Cavell. In 1941, he received a small role in Warner Bros. war drama Underground directed by Vincent Sherman. Like many other German and Austrian actors who fled the Nazis, he ended up portraying them in films.

In 1941, Arco received a fairly good role in the Hal B. Wallis film Dr. Ehrlich's Magic Bullet starring Edward G. Robinson. In 1942, Arco plays a Nazi radio censor who is ultimately sent to the Russian Front in Warner Bros.' anti-Nazi movie Berlin Correspondent, with Dana Andrews. Later that year, Arco received one scene as a refugee in Casablanca. He is seen in the introduction to Rick's Cafe looking very depressed. He has one line, "waiting, waiting, waiting....I'll never get out of here....I'll die in Casablanca."

In 1943, Arco appeared in 14 films, mostly playing Nazis and mostly uncredited. In Edge of Darkness, starring Errol Flynn, he played a German lieutenant confiscating materials such as food and clothing from a Norwegian town in an extremely arrogant way. Jack L. Warner wanted to leave no doubt as to his opinion of the morals of the Nazis. He played a German alpine officer in Chetniks! The Fighting Guerrillas, a wartime movie on German-occupied Yugoslavia by Twentieth Century-Fox. In Hitler's Madman, he portrayed a sergeant.

Later, Arco appeared in Warner Bros's controversial film Mission to Moscow, starring Walter Huston. Arco played another Nazi in Hostages. In The Strange Death of Adolf Hitler, Arco portrayed a Gestapo officer. Arco again played a Nazi in The Cross of Lorraine. In The Song of Bernadette, Arco got to get away from the Nazi image by portraying a Franciscan friar. He also had a small role as a German submarine commander in another Humphrey Bogart movie, Action in the North Atlantic.

Arco's roles started to diminish as the war came to a close. In 1945, he appeared in only one film, as a German colonel in the war drama Counter-Attack.

== Later career ==
After the Second World War ended in 1945, Arco returned to Europe. In 1949, he was working in West Germany and filmed Duel with Death where he used his birth name Lutz Altschul. He would only appear in three more films after this. He did Straße zur Heimat in Austria in 1952 and later played Herr Dörfl in Question 7 in West Germany in 1961. Arco's last film was done in Switzerland, a Swiss melodrama/documentary on abortion called The Doctor Speaks Out in 1966. In 1972, while in his 70s, Arco appeared in a television episode of Kung Fu starring David Carradine.

== Death ==
Arco died at age 75, not in Casablanca, as his character stated in the movie, but in Zürich, Switzerland.

== Selected filmography ==
- Die Teppichknüpferin von Bagdad (1925)
- Spiel mit Menschen (1922)
- The Love of a Queen (1923)
- Die Liebe einer Königin (1923)
- Fire of Love (1925) – Johannes Hellmer, Maler
- Sacco und Vanzetti (1927) – Sacco
- Napoleon at Saint Helena (1929) – Graf Montholon
- Love's Carnival (1930) – Peter von Remberg – Oberleutnant
- The Forester's Daughter (1931) – Österreichischer Offizier
- Yorck (1931)
- The Black Hussar (1932)
- Nurse Edith Cavell (1939) – Private Rammler
- Nick Carter, Master Detective (1939) – Yacht Captain (uncredited)
- Dr. Ehrlich's Magic Bullet (1940) – Dr. Bertheim (uncredited)
- Underground (1941) – Otto
- All Through the Night (1942) – Shortwave Radio Man (uncredited)
- Pacific Rendezvous (1942) – Assistant (uncredited)
- Berlin Correspondent (1942) – Censor (uncredited)
- Desperate Journey (1942) – Feldwebel (Sgt.) Gertz (uncredited)
- Casablanca (1942) – Refugee at Rick's (uncredited)
- Chetniks! The Fighting Guerrillas (1943) – Alpine Officer (uncredited)
- The Moon Is Down (1943) – Schumann (uncredited)
- Hangmen Also Die! (1943) – Nazi Official (uncredited)
- Edge of Darkness (1943) – German Lieutenant (uncredited)
- Mission to Moscow (1943) – Train Announcer (uncredited)
- This Land Is Mine (1943) – German Sergeant (uncredited)
- Action in the North Atlantic (1943) – Submarine Commander (uncredited)
- Hitler's Madman (1943) – German Sergeant (uncredited)
- Appointment in Berlin (1943) – Army Captain (uncredited)
- Bomber's Moon (1943) – Mess Sergeant (uncredited)
- Hostages (1943) – Nazi Officer
- Adventures of the Flying Cadets (1943) – Ernst – Nazi Radioman [Chs. 5-9]
- The Strange Death of Adolf Hitler (1943) – Gestapo Officer (uncredited)
- Gangway for Tomorrow (1943) – Squad Officer (uncredited)
- The Cross of Lorraine (1943) – Nazi Guard (uncredited)
- The Song of Bernadette (1943) – Franciscan friar (uncredited)
- Address Unknown (1944) – German (uncredited)
- The Hitler Gang (1944) – Rudy (uncredited)
- The Story of Dr. Wassell (1944) – Mate of the 'Janssen' (uncredited)
- The Black Parachute (1944) – Orderly (uncredited)
- Wilson (1944) – German Delegate (uncredited)
- Secrets of Scotland Yard (1944) – General Carl Eberling (uncredited)
- The Big Noise (1944) – German Officer (uncredited)
- Son of Lassie (1945) – Sentry (uncredited)
- Counter-Attack (1945) – German Colonel (uncredited)
- Duel with Death (1949) – Gerichtsvorsitzender
- Road to Home (1952) – Jonny Pospidil
- Die schöne Tölzerin (1952)
- Question 7 (1961) – Herr Dörfl – Kirchenältester
- The Doctor Speaks Out (1966) – Defense lawyer
