= Must We Get Divorced? =

Must We Get Divorced? may refer to:

- Must We Get Divorced? (1933 film), a German comedy film
- Must We Get Divorced? (1953 film), a West German comedy film
