= All Through the Night (film) =

1942 film

- Theatrical release poster
- Directed by: Vincent Sherman
- Screenplay by: Leonard Spigelgass; Edwin Gilbert
- Story by: Leo Rosten (as Leonard Q. Ross); Leonard Spigelgass
- Produced by: Hal B. Wallis (executive producer); Jerry Wald (associate producer)
- Starring: Humphrey Bogart; Conrad Veidt; Kaaren Verne; Peter Lorre; Jackie Gleason; Phil Silvers
- Cinematography: Sidney Hickox
- Edited by: Rudi Fehr
- Music by: Adolph Deutsch (score); Song: "All Through the Night"; Arthur Schwartz (music); Johnny Mercer (lyrics)
- Production company: Warner Bros. Pictures
- Distributed by: Warner Bros. Pictures
- Release date: January 10, 1942 (US)
- Running time: 107 minutes
- Country: United States
- Language: English
- Budget: $643,000
- Box office: $1,968,000

All Through the Night is a 1942 American comedy-crime-spy thriller film directed by Vincent Sherman and starring Humphrey Bogart, Conrad Veidt and Kaaren Verne, and featuring many of the Warner Bros. company of character actors. The supporting cast features Peter Lorre, Frank McHugh, Jackie Gleason, Phil Silvers, Barton MacLane, and William Demarest.

== Plot ==
The gang of big-shot Broadway gambler Alfred "Gloves" Donahue, at a restaurant, plays with military toys, imagining fighting Hitler. The restaurant gives Gloves a cheesecake not made by Mr. Miller, a baker who makes Gloves' favorite cheesecake, and Donahue is unhappy. His mother, "Ma" Donahue, tells him Miller, her neighbor, is missing and she's "got a feeling" something sinister has happened. Gloves searches the bakery and finds Miller's dead body. A young singer, Leda Hamilton, quickly leaves the shop upon hearing about Miller's demise. Mrs. Donahue believes that the girl knows something and tracks her down to a night club, where she creates a racket by "crabbing" about Miller's death. Marty Callahan, co-owner of the club, calls Gloves, insisting that he come down and take care of the situation. While at the club, Gloves has a drink with Leda that is interrupted by her piano player, Pepi, who takes her away to a back room, where he shoots Marty's partner, Joe Denning. Leda and Pepi then disappear in a taxi as Gloves stumbles upon Joe. Before dying, Joe raises up five fingers to indicate who took Leda. Gloves quickly leaves to search for Leda, inadvertently leaving one of his gloves at the murder scene.

While being suspected of Joe's murder by Marty and the police, Gloves traces the taxi to an antiques auction house operated by Hall Ebbing and his assistant, Madame. Gloves poses as a bidder but is recognized by Pepi. Gloves sees Leda and trusts her, but she subsequently knocks him out; he is tied up and left in a storage room with one of his boys, Sunshine, who was captured earlier. Later, Leda visits them and helps them break free before they can be shipped out in crates. While escaping, Gloves and Sunshine walk into a room with maps, charts, a short-wave radio, and a portrait of Adolf Hitler. They realize what Joe was indicating before he died: their captors are "fivers" or Nazi fifth columnists. Gloves finds a notebook and reads Miller's name in it as well as that of "Leda Hamilton", her Jewish name "Uda Hammel", and the death of her father in Dachau concentration camp.

With Leda in tow, they escape. They are chased by Ebbing and his cronies into Central Park. Here, Leda explains that she works with Ebbing only to save her father's life. While Gloves fights with a Nazi, Leda reads the torn-out page that states her father is already dead. Gloves and Leda go to the police, who search the antique house, but find it empty. Not believing Gloves's story, they attempt to arrest him, but he escapes by diving into the East River. He arrives at his lawyer's apartment, only to have Marty and his mob break in, eager to avenge Joe's murder. After Gloves convinces them of his innocence, the two gangs join forces against the Nazi spies.

Gloves, Sunshine, and Barney go to the police station where Leda is being held. Ebbing, however, has bailed her out, and they arrive as she is being forced into a car. Following the car, they find a large underground Nazi meeting. Gloves and Sunshine capture two Nazis and impersonate them to get in, but the explosives expert Gloves is impersonating is asked to report on his work. Gloves and Sunshine stall the meeting using a double talk ruse until the combined gangs arrive to break it up. Ebbing escapes, asking Pepi to join him in a suicide attack to blow up a battleship in New York harbor. Pepi refuses, so Ebbing kills him and proceeds alone. Gloves follows him to the docks, but Ebbing surprises him and forces him into a motorboat containing high explosives. At gunpoint, Ebbing forces Gloves to steer the boat toward the battleship. Gloves suddenly steers the boat off course and jumps into the water, while the boat with Ebbing still on board crashes into a barge loaded with lumber and explodes.

Back at the police station, Gloves and Leda find out that all charges have been dropped and that the mayor is going to honor him at city hall. Ma Donahue enters complaining that the milkman has disappeared, and as before, she's "got a feeling" about it.

== Cast ==
- Humphrey Bogart as Alfred "Gloves" Donahue
- Conrad Veidt as Hall Ebbing
- Kaaren Verne as Leda Hamilton
- Jane Darwell as Mrs. 'Ma' Donahue
- Frank McHugh as Barney
- Peter Lorre as Pepi
- Judith Anderson as Madame
- William Demarest as Sunshine
- Jackie Gleason as Starchy (credited as "Jackie C. Gleason")
- Phil Silvers as Waiter
- Wallace Ford as Spats Hunter, Gloves' lawyer (credited as "Wally Ford")
- Barton MacLane as Marty Callahan
- Edward Brophy as Joe Denning
- Martin Kosleck as Steindorff
- Jean Ames as Annabelle
- Ludwig Stössel as Mr. Herman Miller
- Irene Seidner as Mrs. Miller
- James Burke as Lieutenant Forbes
- Ben Welden as Smitty
- Hans Schumm as Anton
- Charles Cane as Sage
- Frank Sully as Spence
- Sam McDaniel as Saratoga (Deacon)
- Eddy Chandler as Police Sergeant (uncredited)
- Louis V. Arco as Short-Wave Radio Man (uncredited)
- Emory Parnell as Cop Outside Warehouse (uncredited)
- Henry Victor as Meeting Receptionist (uncredited)

== Production ==
Production was completed in early October 1941, two months before the attack on Pearl Harbor. The film was released in New York on January 23, 1942.

Producer Hal B. Wallis made All Through the Night as a "companion piece" to his earlier anti-Nazi melodrama, Underground, despite the poor box office of the prior film.

Humphrey Bogart was not the first person considered for the lead in the film: it was originally supposed to be played by Walter Winchell, the gossip columnist who would later be the narrator for the TV series The Untouchables. When Winchell could not get the time off to make the film, Wallis offered it to George Raft, and then, when Raft turned it down, to Bogart. It was one of several parts Bogart played which had originally been offered to Raft.

Olivia de Havilland and Marlene Dietrich were considered for the female lead.

On TCM.com, Mark Frankel reports that the scene in which Bogart and William Demarest confuse a room full of Nazi sympathizers with doubletalk was not part of the original script, “Sherman thought the idea up himself and presented it to producer Hal Wallis. Wallis hated the idea, but Sherman was so convinced that the film needed it, that he shot it anyway. When Wallis saw the scene in the rough cut, he angrily told Sherman to take it out. Sherman, however, left a bit of it in and when the film had a sneak preview, the audience ‘exploded with laughter' at the double-talk. Wallis told Sherman to put it all back in.”

== Reception ==
Review aggregator Rotten Tomatoes gives the film a 100% rating based on ten contemporary and today's reviews, with an average rating of 7.5/10.

Leonard Maltin gives it 3 out of 4 stars: "Interesting blend of spy, gangster, and comedy genres, with memorable double-talk and auction scenes".

Bosley Crowther of The New York Times gave the film a mostly positive review, writing: "In spite of its slap-bang construction and its hour-and-three-quarters length, the picture does move with precision and steadily maintained suspense ... All Through the Night is not exactly a melodrama out of the top drawer, but it is a super-duper action picture—mostly duper, when you stop to think."

On Dec. 3, 1941, before the attack on Pearl Harbor, a reviewer for Variety wrote: "Somewhat on the lurid side and with the Nazi menace motif of familiar timber, shortcomings are compensated for by fast-moving continuity which smartly builds suspense and hold (sic) attention." By December 31, Variety had changed its tune: "Chase and gunbattle in Central Park, scraps in the warehouse district, the mystery girl in distress, emphasis on danger to American institutions from foreign conspirators add up to elementary but surefire audience appeal."

Film Daily called it a "fast-moving and exciting melodrama". Russell Maloney of The New Yorker panned the film, writing that "Hitchcock himself couldn't have asked for a better plot," but claiming that it was brought down by "the feebleness of invention, the wordiness of the dialogue, [and] the sluggishly paced direction".

=== Box office ===
According to Warner Bros records the film earned $1,009,000 domestically and $959,000 foreign during its initial run.

Variety estimated the film had earned $1.1 million domestically by the end of 1942.

== See also ==
- America First Committee
