= Richard Ryen =

Hungarian-American actor

- Born: Richard Anton Robert Felix; 13 September 1885; Főherczeglak, Hungary (today Kneževo, Croatia)
- Died: December 22, 1965 (aged 80); Los Angeles, California, U.S.
- Occupation: Actor
- Years active: 1932—1949

Richard Ryen (13 September 1885 – 22 December 1965) was a Hungarian-born actor who was expelled from Germany by the Nazis prior to World War II.

== Early life ==
Ryen was born Richard Anton Robert Felix Revy in Hungary. He began working in Germany as an actor and later became a well-respected stage director at the Munich Kammerspiele (Munich Chamber Theater). His first movie was the comedy Die verkaufte Braut (1932) followed by a bit part in Must We Get Divorced? (1933) with S. Z. Sakall. Felix made three more movies, Weiße Majestät, Peer Gynt and Das Erbe von Pretoria (all 1934) in Germany before the Nazis expelled him.

== Settles in Hollywood ==
Felix emigrated to Hollywood in October 1938 and changed his name to Ryen. In Hollywood, as was the fate for so many German actors and actresses of that time, like Conrad Veidt, he was mainly cast in Nazi roles, which kept him working during the war years.

Working for Warner Bros., his first movie was as an uncredited role as a Nazi radio station manager in the anti-Nazi movie Berlin Correspondent (1942) which starred Dana Andrews. Right after that movie, he received another small role as a German policeman in Desperate Journey starring Ronald Reagan, Errol Flynn and Raymond Massey. He appeared on screen for 15 seconds while he is checking a license plate.

Within weeks, at age 56, Ryen obtained the role which resulted in his best remembered performance, that of Colonel Heinze in Casablanca (1942), where he constantly had to tail his superior Major Heinrich Strasser (Conrad Veidt). His scenes took four weeks to shoot and, at $400 a week, he earned $1,600.

After Casablanca, Ryen appeared in 16 more films. His first credited film in America was The Constant Nymph (1943) with Charles Boyer and Joan Fontaine. He played the radio announcer in 20th Century Fox's Chetniks! The Fighting Guerrillas. Later in the year, Ryen played a Nazi officer in the war drama The Cross of Lorraine with Peter Lorre and Hans Twardowski. In 1944, he appeared with John Qualen in An American Romance and The Hitler Gang showing the rise of Adolf Hitler.

== Postwar ==
With the end of the World War II, German actors playing Nazis were less in demand and Ryen's appearances in films dried up by the end of the decade. He had small roles in three movies in 1945, This Love of Ours starring Claude Rains, Salome Where She Danced with Yvonne De Carlo and Paris Underground. Ryen appeared in one movie in 1946, playing a butler in Crack-Up with Pat O'Brien. His last film, another small role, was A Foreign Affair (1948) with Marlene Dietrich.

In 10 of the 19 films he made in America, including Casablanca, he was omitted from the credits. He also appeared on stage in America and after 1946 took guest roles at a theater in Basel, Switzerland, before becoming a freelance writer.

Ryen died in Los Angeles on December 22, 1965, at the age of 80.

== Selected filmography ==
- The Bartered Bride (1932) - Finanzrat (uncredited)
- Must We Get Divorced? (1933) - Gottfrieds Rechtsanwalt
- The Tunnel (1933) - Gordon
- White Majesty (1933) - Direktor des Berghotels
- The Legacy of Pretoria (1934) - Georg Miller
- Peer Gynt (1934) - Gunarson
- Berlin Correspondent (1942) - Official (uncredited)
- Desperate Journey (1942) - Staadtpoliceman Heinze (uncredited)
- Casablanca (1942) - Col. Heinz - Strasser's Aide (uncredited)
- Chetniks! The Fighting Guerrillas (1943) - Commentator (uncredited)
- Mission to Moscow (1943) - German Major (uncredited)
- Hitler's Madman (1943) - Gestapo (uncredited)
- The Constant Nymph (1943) - Kyril Trigorin
- First Comes Courage (1943) - Dr. Hoff (uncredited)
- Hostages (1943) - Elderly Nazi Soldier
- The Strange Death of Adolf Hitler (1943) - Gen. Palzer
- Gangway for Tomorrow (1943) - Col. Mueller
- The Cross of Lorraine (1943) - Lieutenant Schmidt
- The Hitler Gang (1944) - Adolf Wagner
- Secrets of Scotland Yard (1944) - Friedrich Eberling (uncredited)
- An American Romance (1944) - Papa Hartzler (uncredited)
- Salome Where She Danced (1945) - Theatre Manager (uncredited)
- Paris Underground (1945) - Mons. Renard
- This Love of Ours (1945) - Chabon (uncredited)
- A Foreign Affair (1948) - Herr Maier (uncredited) (final film role)
