= Different from You and Me =

1957 film

Different from You and Me (§175)
- DVD cover with frame shot of Klaus Teichmann and Boris Winkler watching wrestlers
- Directed by: Veit Harlan
- Written by: Felix Lützkendorf; Hans Giese (scientific advisor)
- Produced by: Gero Wecker
- Starring: Christian Wolff; Paula Wessely; Paul Dahlke; Hans Nielsen
- Cinematography: Kurt Grigoleit
- Edited by: Walter Wischniewsky
- Music by: Erwin Halletz; Oskar Sala (electronic music)
- Production company: Arca-Filmproduktion GmbH
- Distributed by: Constantin Film
- Release date: 1957
- Running time: 92 minutes
- Country: West Germany
- Language: German

Film title of the West German release (censored version)

Different from You and Me (§175) (German: Anders als du und ich (§175)) is a 1957 feature film on the subject of homosexuality directed by Veit Harlan. The film was subject to censorship in Germany, and several scenes had to be altered before it could be released.

== Plot ==
Different from You and Me (§175) centers around the well-to-do Teichmann family in Berlin. Klaus, the 17-year-old son of Werner and Christa Teichmann, has begun to lead a life that increasingly worries his parents. Although he is an outstanding student, Klaus spends most of his free time with Manfred, a low academic achiever raised by a relatively poor single mother. The two boys share an interest in the arts, and Manfred has just published a poem in the local newspaper. Klaus has to protect Manfred from classroom bullies who attack him for his effeteness.

The Teichmanns become even more concerned when they learn that Manfred has introduced Klaus to the antique dealer Boris Winkler, who hosts decadent all-male get-togethers at his home, featuring avant-garde electronic music and freestyle wrestling by scantily clad young men. When Werner and Christa Teichmann get wind of this, they visit a psychologist, who cautions them that their son is in danger of being turned into a homosexual and that his parents should encourage him to socialize with girls his age.

When Werner Teichmann tries to ground his son, Klaus sneaks out through the bedroom window. His father searches for him, first at Manfred's apartment, then at Winkler's place, and finally at a demimonde club featuring a drag performance. Werner Teichmann finally confronts Winkler in a meeting with him in his home.

Not to be outdone, Christa Teichmann takes matters into her own hands. With the help of their housemaid, Gerda, she devises a plan to seduce Klaus and turn him from his homosexual ways. The plan is put into motion when Mr. and Mrs. Teichmann go away on a weekend trip, leaving Gerda and Klaus home alone. Gerda successfully seduces Klaus and in effect turns him straight.

All does not end well, however: at the instigation of Boris Winkler, Christa Teichmann is taken to court where she is charged with and found guilty of procuring the relationship between Gerda and Klaus.

== Cast ==
- Christian Wolff as Klaus Teichmann, a schoolboy
- Paul Dahlke as Werner Teichmann, Klaus' father, a bank director
- Paula Wessely as Christa Teichmann, Klaus' mother, a housewife
- Hans Nielsen as Max Mertens, Christa Teichmann's brother
- Ingrid Stenn as Gerda Böttcher, the Teichmanns' housemaid
- Guenther Theil as Manfred Glatz, a schoolboy
- Hilde Körber as Mrs. Glatz, Manfred's mother, a widowed seamstress
- Friedrich Joloff as Dr. Boris Winkler, an antiques dealer
- Paul Esser as Police Commissioner
- Otto Graf as Chief Justice
- Herbert Hübner as Defender Dr. Schwartz
- Siegfried Schürenberg as Prosecutor
- Hans Schumm as Psychologist

== Production ==
=== Background ===
The film, based on an idea by Robert Pilchowski, was produced when homosexual acts between men were criminal under the German Criminal Code §175. It was the goal of Hans Giese, a homosexual emancipation activist serving as scientific advisor to the film, to shift public opinion toward reforming the law.

Veit Harlan, protégé of Joseph Goebbels and director of the anti-Semitic propaganda film Jud Süß (1940), directed. A story about a mother "saving" her son from homosexuality only to be prosecuted for procuring, Different from You and Me was not just a remarkably frank film about homosexuality, which was still taboo, but challenged the outmoded German law against procuring. As a result of its handling of both issues, the film was initially banned and had to be revised.

Entitled Bewildered Youth on its initial English-language release, the film also depicts a youthful rebellion against prosperous post-war Germany.

=== Writing and pre-production ===
The film is based on a screenplay written by Felix Lützkendorf entitled Eltern klagen an (Parents Accuse), which was intended to serve as a warning about the dangers supposedly presented by homosexuality. In a letter to the production company, Harlan argued for a more nuanced approach: "I think what's missing in the script is the fact that there are two types of homosexuals - namely those who have been handicapped by nature, and those who criminally violate nature. The latter act based either on innate immorality or for material gain, or because of damnable weakness. The former, however, deserve our complete sympathy. If we want to be a magnanimous people, we must regard their lives as tragic, and the film must not condemn or persecute them based on any narrow-minded viewpoints. We may prosecute them only in the instances when they seduce youngsters whose nature is basically normal."

=== Production and censorship ===
Film title of the original, uncensored release in Austria

The film was shot between May 8 and June 3, 1957, and premiered in several Viennese cinemas on August 29, 1957, with the original title The Third Sex (German: Das dritte Geschlecht). The release in West Germany was, however, initially blocked by the West German film industry censorship and rating agency FSK, which stated that this film was overly sympathetic toward homosexuality and would be welcomed only by homosexuals, while "all the population who retain their sense of morality and justice (and this is by far the majority of people) here have their sensibilities most seriously violated." Homosexuality ought instead to be portrayed as a menace to society.

== Distribution and reception ==
After a number of scenes were dropped, reshot, or redubbed, the film was finally approved for release in West Germany under the new title Different from You and Me (§175); meanwhile, it continued to run unaltered and under its original title in Austria. The West German premiere in Stuttgart on October 31, 1957, was followed by protest actions and demonstrations in that Harlan created a work wherein homophobia paralleled the anti-Semitism in his Jud Süß. Some critics also objected to the negative portrayal of avant-garde music in the film, although such criticism was itself not entirely free of homophobic undertones, since these critics wanted to free electronic music from its association with the decadent homosexual milieu.

=== Differences between the original and censored versions ===
Several changes were made to the film to satisfy the requirements of the FSK. These include:

- A documentary interview with psychologists and sexologists on the subject of homosexuality at the beginning of the film was entirely dropped.
- The scene in which Werner Teichmann and his brother-in-law Max Mertens question Mrs. Glatz about the relationship and whereabouts of Klaus and her son was redubbed, making Max's parting remarks less tolerant and more homophobic.
- The scene in which Werner and Christa Teichmann consult with a psychologist about their son was redubbed, making the psychologist's statements more homophobic.
- The sexual encounter between Klaus and Gerda was in part reshot, so as to expose less of her breasts.
- A scene was entirely dropped in which Boris Winkler socializes at home with a group of foreign gay friends, who speak in English, French, and Italian. Likewise dropped was a scene in which Winkler consults his homosexual lawyer as to how to respond to the Teichmanns' accusations that he is seducing Klaus. These scenes were objectionable because they conveyed the impression that gay men held important positions in society.
- Boris Winkler leaves for Italy in the original version but is arrested at the Bahnhof Zoo station on his way to the train in the censored version, suggesting that justice will be served when innocent youths are seduced.
- Christa Teichmann, sentenced to six months in prison for procuring in the original, instead receives probation, making the court system appear more reasonable.

Film title of the American release

=== American release ===
Under the title The Third Sex, a dubbed version of the film, translated by Frederick Laing (1905–1994), was released by David Dietz in the United States in 1958 and distributed by the D. F. Distributing Corp. This version generally hews more closely to the original as shown in Austria than to the West German version, but cuts were made. As in the West German version, the opening interview with psychologists and psychiatrists was entirely dropped. The scene where the psychologist, played by Hans Schumm, consults with Klause's parents, Werner and Christa Teichmann, is replaced with a scene where the psychologist is played by a different actor (although Schumm is credited in the opening), and consulting only with the mother:

- Psychologist played by Hans Schumm, German edition: Anders als du und ich (§ 175)
- Psychologist played by Hans Schumm, German edition (with English subtitles): Anders als du und ich (§ 175)
- Psychologist played by unidentified actor, American edition: The Third Sex (this clip glitches at 54 minutes)

The sexual encounter between Klaus and Gerda was greatly shortened in comparison with either the Austrian version or the (tamer) West German version.

The film also circulated under the title Bewildered Youth.

=== DVD release ===
In December 2006, the Munich Film Museum released the West German version of the film. The alternative scenes from the original version as screened in Austria are included in the bonus features on the DVD, allowing for a comparison to be made between the two versions of the film.

To date, the full-length version of the original film has not been re-released.
