= Martin Kosleck =

German actor (1904–1994)

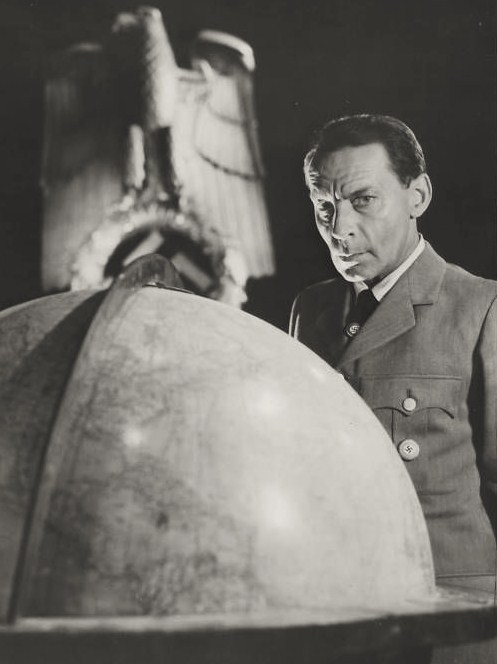
- Kosleck in Hitler (1962)
- Born: Nicolaie Yoshkin; March 24, 1904; Barkotzen, Province of Pomerania, German Empire (now Barkocin, Pomeranian Voivodeship, Poland)
- Died: January 15, 1994 (aged 89); Santa Monica, California, U.S.
- Occupation: Actor
- Years active: 1927–1980
- Spouse: Eleonore von Mendelssohn (m. 1947; died 1951)

Martin Kosleck (born Nicolaie Yoshkin; March 24, 1904 – January 15, 1994) was a German film actor. Like many other German actors, he fled when the Nazis came to power. Inspired by his deep hatred of Adolf Hitler and the Nazis, Kosleck made a career in Hollywood playing villainous Nazis in films.

While in the United States, he appeared in more than 80 films and television shows in a 46-year span. His icy demeanor and piercing stare on screen made him a popular choice to play Nazi villains. He portrayed Joseph Goebbels, Adolf Hitler's propaganda minister, five times, and also appeared as an SS trooper and a concentration camp officer.

== Early life ==
Kosleck was born in Barkotzen in Pomerania, Germany, the son of a forester. His family was "German-Russian". He became interested in acting at an early age. He spent six years in the Max Reinhardt Dramatic School, particularly excelling in Shakespearian roles, and working in revues and musicals in Berlin.

At the age of 23, he appeared in his first film, a silent movie directed by Johannes Brandt called Der Fahnenträger von Sedan. Two years later, he appeared in Lupu Pick's Napoleon at Saint Helena. Kosleck appeared in two more films in Germany in 1930, the science-fiction thriller Alraune (his first sound film) and The Singing City.

== Hollywood ==
In the early 1930s, Hitler and the Nazi Party were growing in power. Kosleck spoke out against both, earning his a place on the Gestapo list of "undesirables". He decided to leave Germany in 1931 for Britain. The following year, he arrived in New York City and then traveled west to Hollywood.

He appeared in his first American film Fashions of 1934 starring Bette Davis. However, he found little work in Hollywood, so he returned to New York and the stage. While Kosleck was acting in The Merchant of Venice on Broadway, Anatole Litvak invited him to Hollywood for a role in a Warner Bros. film. The 1939 Confessions of a Nazi Spy, starring Edward G. Robinson, Francis Lederer, Paul Lukas, and George Sanders, was based on The Nazi Spy Conspiracy in America, a book by Leon Turron, an FBI agent who had uncovered the network of Nazi organizations throughout the United States. Kosleck, in a small role playing Nazi Propaganda Minister Joseph Goebbels, revealed a sinister streak of evil that was sought after in wartime movies to come.

Many other German actors at the time resented being typecast as Nazis; Kosleck, though, reveled in it as a way to get back at the Nazis. He appeared in numerous anti-Nazi films of the early 1940s: Nurse Edith Cavell, Espionage Agent, Underground, Berlin Correspondent, Bomber's Moon, and Chetniks! The Fighting Guerrillas. However, it was his impression of Goebbels that will remain in the memories of moviegoers, especially in Paramount's 1944 pseudo-documentary The Hitler Gang.

With the end of the Second World War, roles as Nazis declined. Kosleck then moved into horror B movies, such as The Frozen Ghost and The Mummy's Curse (both starring Lon Chaney Jr., whom Kosleck disliked intensely), House of Horrors, and She-Wolf of London, starring June Lockhart. The House of Horrors gave him his best-remembered role beyond Goebbels, as an insane sculptor, Marcel De Lange, who saves a monster from drowning and gets revenge by having the monster kill his critics.

== Television ==
With fewer film opportunities presenting themselves, Kosleck returned to New York City with his wife, the German-born actress Eleonore von Mendelssohn, a great x3 grand daughter of the philosopher Moses Mendelssohn. Kosleck appeared on Broadway in The Madwoman of Chaillot in the late 1940s and early 1950s. He also appeared on television in episodes of numerous shows. In 1951, he appeared in the "I Lift Up My Lamp" episode of Hallmark Hall of Fame, a television anthology of plays and books, and episodes of The Motorola Television Hour, where he played Goebbels again, Studio One, Thriller, The Rifleman, Voyage to the Bottom of the Sea, The Outer Limits, Get Smart, Batman (playing Professor Avery Evans Charm), The Man from U.N.C.L.E., The F.B.I., The Wild Wild West, Mission: Impossible, It Takes a Thief, and Sanford and Son.

In 1970, Kosleck played (Gestapo) General Mueller in the television comedy Hogan's Heroes, episode: "The Gestapo Takeover". He suffered from a heart attack in the 1970s, and thereafter worked only occasionally, mostly in television. During this time, he appeared in Love, American Style; Banacek; and Sanford and Son. In 1980, he appeared in his last film, The Man with Bogart's Face.

== Art ==
Aside from acting, Kosleck was an accomplished painter who supported himself through his work as a portrait artist while waiting for a movie role. An impressionist-style portrait-painter, he painted both Bette Davis and Marlene Dietrich.

== Personal life and death ==
Kosleck was in a relationship with fellow actor and German emigrant Hans Heinrich von Twardowski from the early 1930s until Twardowski's death in 1958. Their sometimes turbulent relationship is discussed in many letters between Twardowski and his close friend Marlene Dietrich. In 1947, Kosleck married, in an unexpected act, the German actress Eleonora von Mendelssohn (her only film is Black Hand, 1950), who committed suicide in 1951.

Kosleck died at age 89, following abdominal surgery, in a Santa Monica convalescent home.

== Filmography ==
- The Standard-Bearer of Sedan (1927)
- Napoleon at Saint Helena (1929)
- Alraune (1929) - Wolfgang Petersen
- The Singing City (1930) - Bobby Bertling - Claires Verehrer
- Fashions of 1934 (1934) - Dance Director (uncredited)
- Confessions of a Nazi Spy (1939) - Joseph Goebbels (uncredited)
- Nurse Edith Cavell (1939) - Pierre
- Espionage Agent (1939) - Karl Mullen
- Nick Carter, Master Detective (1939) - Otto King
- Calling Philo Vance (1940) - Gamble
- Foreign Correspondent (1940) - Tramp
- The Mad Doctor (1941) - Maurice Gretz
- Underground (1941) - Heller
- International Lady (1941) - Bruner
- The Devil Pays Off (1941) - Grebb, Henchman
- All Through the Night (1942) - Steindorff
- Fly-by-Night (1942) - George Taylor
- Nazi Agent (1942) - Kurt Richten
- Berlin Correspondent (1942) - Captain von Rau
- Divide and Conquer (1942) - German Officer (uncredited)
- Manila Calling (1942) - Heller
- Chetniks! The Fighting Guerrillas (1943) - Col. Wilhelm Brockner
- Bomber's Moon (1943) - Luftwaffe Maj. von Streicher
- The North Star (1943) - Dr. Richter
- The Great Alaskan Mystery (1944, Serial) - Dr. Hauss
- The Hitler Gang (1944) - Joseph Goebbels
- Secrets of Scotland Yard (1944) - Josef
- The Mummy's Curse (1944) - Ragheb
- Strange Holiday (1945) - Examiner
- The Frozen Ghost (1945) - Rudi Poldan
- Gangs of the Waterfront (1945) - Anjo Ferreati
- Pursuit to Algiers (1945) - Mirko
- The Spider (1945) - Mihail Barak
- Crime of the Century (1946) - Paul
- Just Before Dawn (1946) - Karl Ganss
- House of Horrors (1946) - Marcel De Lange
- The Wife of Monte Cristo (1946) - Edmund Dantes, Count of Monte Cristo
- She-Wolf of London (1946) - Dwight Severn
- The Beginning or the End (1947) - Dr. O.E. Frisch (uncredited)
- Half Past Midnight (1948) - Cortez
- Assigned to Danger (1948) - Louie Volkes
- Smugglers' Cove (1948) - Count Boris Petrov
- Spion für Deutschland (1956) - Griffins
- Something Wild (1961) - Landlord
- Hitler (1962) - Joseph Goebbels
- The Flesh Eaters (1964) - Prof. Peter Bartell
- 36 Hours (1965) - Kraatz
- Morituri (1965) - Wilke
- Agent for H.A.R.M. (1966) - Basil Malko
- Wake Me When the War Is Over (1969, TV Movie) - Butler
- Which Way to the Front? (1970) - Captain Schmidt (uncredited)
- Longstreet (1971, TV Movie) - Von Marks
- The Man with Bogart's Face (1980) - Horst Borsht (final film role)
