= Barkocin =

- Village
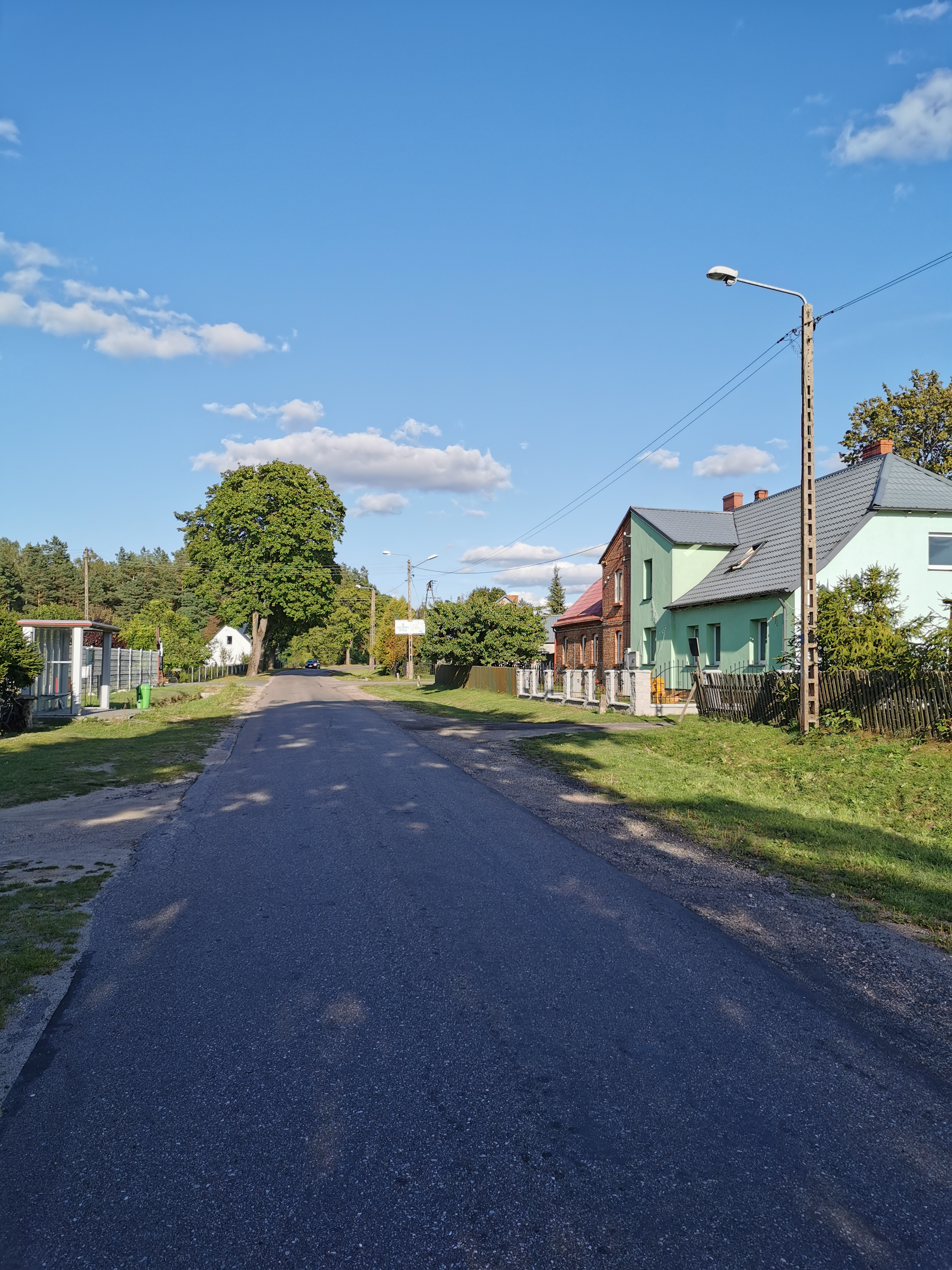

- Location within Poland
- Coordinates: 54°9′2″N 17°12′19″E
- Country: Poland
- Voivodeship: Pomeranian
- County: Bytów
- Gmina: Kołczygłowy
- Population: 70
- Time zone: UTC+1 (CET)
  - Summer (DST): UTC+2 (CEST)

Barkocin [barˈkɔt͡ɕin] (German: Barkotzen) is a village in the administrative district of Gmina Kołczygłowy, within Bytów County, Pomeranian Voivodeship, in northern Poland. It is located within the historic region of Pomerania.

== Notable residents ==
- Martin Kosleck (1904–1994), German actor
