= The Bashful Elephant =

1961 film by Dorrell McGowan by Stuart E. McGowan

- Directed by: Dorrell McGowan (de); Stuart E. McGowan (fr); Rudolf Zehetgruber (asst. dir.)
- Written by: Dorrell McGowan (de); Stuart E. McGowan (fr)
- Produced by: Allied Artists
- Starring: Mollie Mack; Helmut Schmid; Kai Fischer
- Cinematography: Hannes Nikel; George Tyson
- Edited by: Hannes Nikel
- Music by: Ronald Stein
- Production company: McGowan International
- Distributed by: Allied Artists Pictures
- Release dates: November 22, 1961 (premiere); February 4, 1962 (USA) (Note: Daily Variety, January 25, 1962, p. 3)
- Running time: 82 minutes
- Countries: United States; Austria

The Bashful Elephant is a 1961 35 mm black and white feature film for family audiences.

== Story ==
A 12-year-old orphan, Tristy (played by Mollie Mack; née Mollie Dorrell McGowan; 1946–1965) — escapes from an orphanage in Hungary (which then, was behind the Iron Curtain) to Austria with the help of Jeffrey, a huge border guard dog (played by a giant Irish Wolfhound) in hopes of finding a "papa and mama." Austrian police vow to help her find a loving family, but, until then, Tristy would need to stay in an orphanage, away from her new friend, Jeffrey, the big dog. So, she escapes again and makes her first new home with a traveling circus owned by Kurt (played by Helmut Schmid) and befriends Valle, the circus elephant.

Kurt is in the middle of a divorce. Steffi (played by Kai Fischer) wants to marry Kurt because she loves him, but also so that they can adopt Tristie. More complications arise with the Salzburg police attempting to take Tristie into custody. When the police are defied by the elephant and the dog, they threaten to shoot both of them. Tristie slips away to give herself up but is followed by her four-footed friends, and decides the only course is for them to run away together.

Lost in the narrow streets she finds refuge in Saint Peter's Abby but is knocked unconscious by a fall down steep steps, picked up by the elephant and taken back to the circus, where eventually there is a climax that brings about a happy conclusion to the story. (Note: Daily Variety, November 1, 1961, p. 6) (Note: Daily Variety, December 26, 1961, p. 3) (Note: Los Angeles Times, December 19, 1962, Sect. D, p. 9) (Note: Variety, December 27, 1961, p. 8) (Note: Variety, January 2, 1963, p. 8)

== Cast ==
Starring roles (and age at date of release):

- Mollie Mack (née Molly McGowan; 1946–1965), Tristy (15 years, 8 months)
- Helmut Schmid, Kurt, the circus owner and elephant trainer (36 years)
- Kai Fischer Steffi, Kurt's sweetheart and circus performer (27 years)

Supporting roles:

- Buddy Baer, tavern owner (36 years)
- Fritz Weiss, Father Francis
- Arnulf Schröder, police inspector (58 years)
- Hans Schumm, Fritz (65 years)
- Hans Pössenbacher, constable (66 years)
- Gernot Duda (de), policeman (33 years)

Animals:

- Giant Irish Wolfhound, Jeffrey
- Elephant, Valle (obtained from a Danish circus)

== Production ==
Tagline – "It's Elephantastic!" The Bashful Elephant was filmed in Austria with an American production crew. It was a family project and was Molly McGowan's last performance. She died of cancer on April 3, 1965 in Los Angeles – at the age of 18 years, 10 months. She had been married to Herbert (Johnnie) Lee Hickey (1942–2002) for only 7 months. Mack had appeared several television and feature pictures. She was the daughter of co-director Dorrell McGowan (fr) and the niece of co-director Stuart Edward McGowan (fr).

== Distribution ==
Daily Variety of October 18, 1961, announced that Allied Artists Pictures had secured worldwide distribution rights to the McGowan International Production. (Note: Daily Variety, October 18, 1961, p. 2)

The film premiered Wednesday, November 22, 1961, at the Fox Burlingame Theater in Burlingame, California, as a companion feature with Disney's 1961 film, Babes in Toyland. Later, it was a companion feature with Disney's 1962 film, In Search of the Castaways.

== Selected reviews ==
A review in Daily Variety of February 9, 1962, suggested removing a scene involving a principal character's infidelity to her boyfriend, as it was unsuitable for juvenile audiences. (Note: Daily Variety, February 9, 1962, p. 3)

== Relationships ==
Dorrell and Stuart McGowan's sister, Roxana (1897–1976), was an actress who married twice, both to film directors, first Albert Ray, then John Malcolm Stahl.

== Songs ==
Ronald Stein composed the music and wrote the lyrics, which were sung by Raffaela.

- "Italian Song"

== See also ==
- "The Bashful Elephant Coloring Book," Saalfield Publishing (1962)
