= Marguerite Chapman =

American actress (1918–1999)

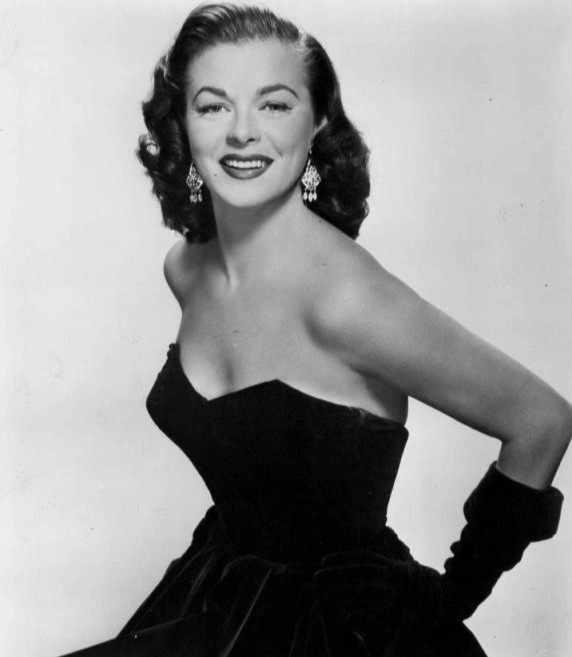
- Chapman in 1953
- Born: March 9, 1918; Chatham, New York, U.S.
- Died: August 31, 1999 (aged 81); Burbank, California, U.S.
- Resting place: Holy Cross Cemetery, Culver City, California
- Occupation: Actress
- Years active: 1940–1977
- Spouses: G. Bentley Ryan (m. 1948; div. 1950) Richard Bremerkamp (m. 1964; div. 1972)

Marguerite Chapman (March 9, 1918 – August 31, 1999) was an American film and television actress. Beginning her career as a model, she moved to Hollywood and appeared in film and television from 1940 to 1977.

== Early years ==
Chapman was born in Chatham, New York, on March 9, 1918. She had four brothers who considered her a tomboy and called her "Slugger". Her education occurred in public schools in Chatham and White Plains, New York. She worked as a telephone operator and typist in White Plains before becoming a John Powers model.

During a year of modeling, Chapman was made aware that producer Howard Hughes was in New York City screening for a new movie he planned to make. Unannounced, she went to Hughes and asked for a chance to be in his picture. He gave her a screen test, which went well. Though Hughes never did film the movie, he showed the screen test to a number of Hollywood studio executives.

== Career ==
She signed with 20th Century Fox and moved to Los Angeles in late 1939. She went on to be placed under contract with Warner Brothers in 1941, and then with Columbia from 1942 to 1948. While she was with Warner she was a member ot the Navy Blues Sextet, a song-and-dance group.

She made her film debut in On Their Own (1940), working for the next two years in small roles. In 1942, her big break came with Republic Pictures when she was cast in the leading female role in the twelve-part adventure film serial Spy Smasher, a production that has been ranked among the best serials ever made.

Chapman soon began receiving more leading roles and appeared opposite important stars such as Edward G. Robinson and George Sanders. With America's entry in World War II, she entertained the troops, worked for the War bond drive and at the Hollywood Canteen. She also starred in the famous pro-Soviet war film Counter-Attack, released in 1945.

During the 1950s, Chapman performed mostly in secondary film roles, including The Seven Year Itch. In the early 1960s she appeared on television shows including Rawhide, Perry Mason, and Four Star Playhouse.

Outside of acting, Chapman was a painter whose work was featured at the Beverly Hills Art League Gallery.

Chapman was reportedly asked to audition for the role of "Old Rose" Dawson-Calvert in the 1997 James Cameron epic Titanic but was prevented by poor health.

For her contribution on television, Marguerite Chapman has a star on the Hollywood Walk of Fame at 6284 Hollywood Boulevard.

== Personal life and death ==
Chapman married attorney G. Bentley Ryan on December 29, 1948, and they separated on December 18, 1949. They were divorced on February 20, 1950. Her second husband was film director Richard Bremerkamp. She died in Providence St. Joseph Medical Center in Burbank, California, on August 31, 1999, aged 81. She was interred in Holy Cross Cemetery, Culver City, California. Her funeral was held on September 4, 1999, at St. Charles Borromeo Catholic Church in North Hollywood, California, where she was a parishioner.
