= Spy Smasher (serial) =

1942 film by William Witney

- Poster for Chapter 7, "Secret Weapon"
- Directed by: William Witney
- Written by: Ronald Davidson; Norman S. Hall; William Lively; Joseph O'Donnell; Joseph Poland
- Based on: Spy Smasher by: C. C. Beck; Bill Parker
- Produced by: William J. O'Sullivan
- Starring: Kane Richmond; Marguerite Chapman; Sam Flint; Hans Schumm; Tris Coffin
- Cinematography: Reggie Lanning
- Edited by: Tony Martinelli; Edward Todd
- Music by: Mort Glickman
- Distributed by: Republic Pictures
- Release date: April 4, 1942 (U.S. serial)
- Running time: 12 chapters (214 minutes) (serial); 100 minutes (TV)
- Country: United States
- Language: English
- Budget: $153,682 (negative cost: $156,431)

Spy Smasher is a 12-episode 1942 Republic serial film based on the Fawcett Comics character Spy Smasher which is now a part of DC Comics. It was the 25th of the 66 serials produced by Republic. The serial was directed by William Witney with Kane Richmond and Marguerite Chapman as the leads. The serial was Chapman's big break into a career in film and television. Spy Smasher is a highly regarded serial. In 1966, a television film was made from the serial footage under the title Spy Smasher Returns.

== Plot ==
Alan Armstrong as the Spy Smasher is a costumed vigilante and freelance agent, not associated with the US government, as the country has not yet joined its allies in World War II. After discovering information about Nazi activities in occupied France, he is captured and ordered to be executed, but with the help of Pierre Durand, he escapes back to the United States, meeting with his twin brother Jack. Jack is incorrectly recognized and attacked by a Nazi agent on American soil. The agent works for a sabotage leader codenamed The Mask, who operates a U-boat near the coast. Eve Corby plays Jack's fiancée.

The Mask's attacks on the United States begin with an attempt to flood the country with forged money and destroy the economy. When this is defeated, he continues with other attacks, including destroying aircraft, oil, and munitions intended for Britain. Constant defeats at the hands of Spy Smasher, with support from Jack Armstrong and Admiral Corby, also lead the villain to take the fight back to the masked hero. In the end, the villain is killed aboard his own U-boat in a sea of flaming oil.

=== Chapters ===
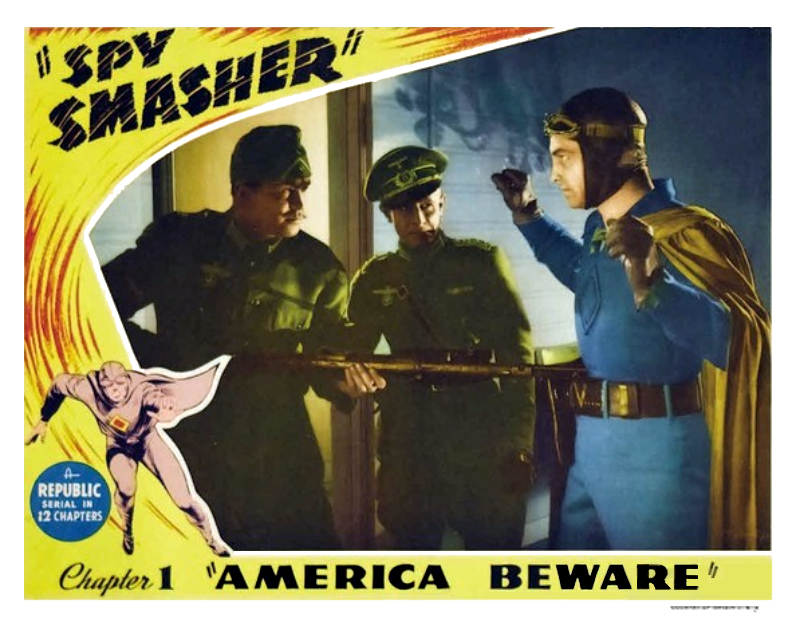
Kane Richmond featured on a lobby card for Chapter 1, "America Beware"

1. America Beware (28min 32s)
2. Human Target (17min 29s)
3. Iron Coffin (16min 48s)
4. Stratosphere Invaders (16min 50s)
5. Descending Doom (16min 48s)
6. The Invisible Witness (16min 39s)
7. Secret Weapon (16min 53s)
8. Sea Raiders (16min 45s)
9. Highway Racketeers (16min 41s)
10. 2700° Fahrenheit (16min 56s)
11. Hero's Death (16min 45s)
12. V..._ (16min 40s)_{Source:}

=== Cliffhangers ===
Chapter 11 has what film historians Harmon and Glut consider to be the "most unique chapter ending of them all": Spy Smasher is gunned down by enemy agents at point-blank range and falls from the top of an office building to crash into the pavement below. In the resolution, the audience discovers that Jack, Spy Smasher's brother, has knocked him out and stolen his costume. The real Spy Smasher turns up too late to save his twin. This is notable because in nearly every other chapter ending ever produced, the person in danger manages to somehow survive.

== Cast ==
- Kane Richmond as "Spy Smasher", his secret identity Alan Armstrong, and his twin brother Jack. The twin brother was added by Republic, but other characters, including Admiral Corby, his daughter Eve, and the villain The Mask, are all from the original comic.
- Marguerite Chapman as Eve Corby, Admiral Corby's daughter and Jack Armstrong's fiancée.
- Sam Flint as Admiral Corby
- Hans Schumm as "The Mask". The Nazi villain of the serial appeared often without the disguise; the only purpose of the mask seemed to be to make him familiar to comic book fans.
- Tris Coffin as Drake, The Mask's spearhead heavy. Drake is a reporter working for the Ocean-wide Television Network. One of his espionage techniques was to leave the camera rolling after an interview inside Admiral Corby's office or a report from a crime scene. The broadcast was then picked up by the Mask in his submarine ("and presumably [by] the sets of any home viewer tuned into the proper channel").

== Production ==
Spy Smasher was budgeted at $153,682, although the final negative cost was $156,431 (a $2,749, or 1.8%, overspend). It was the most expensive Republic serial of 1942. Spy Smasher was filmed between December 22, 1941, and January 29, 1942. The serial's production number was 1196.

Spy Smasher's aircraft from the comic, the Gyrosub, was changed for the serial to be a secret Nazi aircraft called The Bat Plane. Mort Glickman echoed the "V for Victory" theme from Beethoven's 5th symphony in the Spy Smasher theme song. Both pieces of music include the "..._" Morse code for the letter V.

Columbia's The Secret Code, released later in 1942, was patterned after Spy Smasher. Adverts for the Columbia serial included the phrases "Smash spies with the Secret Service" and "Thrill again to spy smashers' biggest chase!"

=== Stunts ===
- Yakima Canutt - Republic's "Ram Rod" (head of the stunt team)
- Carey Loftin as Alan/Jack Armstrong & Spy Smasher (doubling Kane Richmond)
- David Sharpe as Alan/Jack Armstrong & Spy Smasher (also doubling Kane Richmond)
- Ken Terrell (doubling Crane Whitley)
- Bud Wolfe (doubling Richard Bond)
- John Daheim
- James Fawcett
- Loren Riebe
- Duke Taylor

Kane Richmond did some of his own stunts, but the most spectacular were performed by Dave Sharpe and Carey Loftin. Sharp, for example, rolled from an overturning motorcycle to leap atop a careening auto that plunged from a cliff. Loftin showed what a motorcycle could do in the hands of an expert.

=== Special effects ===
All the special effects in Spy Smasher were created by Republic's in-house effects duo, the Lydecker brothers.

== Release ==
=== Theatrical ===
Spy Smasher's official release date is April 4, 1942, although this is actually the date the sixth chapter was made available to film exchanges.

=== Television ===
Spy Smasher was one of 26 Republic serials re-released as a Century 66 film on television in 1966. The title of the film was changed to Spy Smasher Returns. This version was cut down to 100-minutes in length.

== Critical reception ==
In the opinion of film historians Harmon and Glut, Spy Smasher is the best serial in terms of special effects and stunts, and one of the best in general; they described it as the foremost cliffhanger example of a whole school of Hollywood filmmaking of the 40s. The script is consistently logical and well-constructed with credible dialogue and good characterization. The cinematography is atmospheric and often artistic. According to Cline, Spy Smasher had a "very tight" and "fast-moving" screenplay. Grant Tracey, writing on the Images Journal website, called Spy Smasher one of the best serials of all time due to its stunning cliffhangers and unique innovations.

== References in other media ==
In the 2005 episode of the animated series Justice League Unlimited entitled "Patriot Act", Spy Smasher appears in a World War II flashback. The plot is unconnected to this serial, as Spy Smasher is shown preventing the creation of Fawcett Comics supervillain, Captain Nazi. The style of the scene is based on a movie serial - it is drawn in black and white with similar action and background music.

== See also ==
- Adventures of Captain Marvel (1941) is the other Republic serial based on a Fawcett comic
- List of film serials
- List of film serials by studio

Preceded by Dick Tracy vs. Crime, Inc. (1941)	Republic Serial; Spy Smasher (1942)	Succeeded by Perils of Nyoka (1942)
