= The Doctor Speaks Out =

1966 film

- Directed by: Aleksander Ford
- Written by: David Wechsler
- Produced by: Artur Brauner
- Starring: Tadeusz Łomnicki; René Deltgen; Margot Trooger
- Cinematography: Eugen Schüfftan
- Edited by: Hermann Haller
- Music by: Robert Blum
- Production companies: Praesens-Film; CCC Film; Fono Film
- Distributed by: Nora Film
- Release date: 10 June 1966
- Running time: 89 minutes
- Countries: West Germany; Switzerland
- Language: German

The Doctor Speaks Out or The Doctor Says (German: Der Arzt stellt fest...) is a 1966 West German-Swiss drama film directed by Aleksander Ford and starring Tadeusz Łomnicki, René Deltgen and Margot Trooger.

The film's sets were designed by Heinrich Weidemann.

== Cast ==
- Tadeusz Łomnicki as Dr. Maurer
- René Deltgen as Dr. Diener
- Margot Trooger as Frau Sidler
- Dieter Borsche as Herr Sidler
- Charles Régnier as Professor
- Peter Oehme as Judge
- Louis V. Arco as Defense lawyer
- Hermann Frick as Prosecutor
- Sabine Bethmann as Frau Maurer
- Gert Westphal as Kriminalkommissar

== Bibliography ==
- Monaco, James. The Encyclopedia of Film. Perigee Books, 1991.
