= Ten Days in Paris =

- U.S. one sheet theatrical poster
- Directed by: Tim Whelan
- Written by: James Curtis; John Meehan Jr.
- Based on: novel The Disappearance of Roger Tremayne by Bruce Graeme
- Produced by: Irving Asher
- Starring: Rex Harrison; Kaaren Verne; C. V. France; Joan Marion
- Cinematography: Otto Kanturek
- Edited by: Hugh Stewart
- Music by: Miklós Rózsa
- Production company: Irving Asher Productions
- Distributed by: Columbia Pictures Corporation (UK)
- Release dates: 1 June 1940 (UK); 20 April 1941 (US)
- Running time: 82 minutes
- Country: United Kingdom
- Language: English

Ten Days in Paris, also known as Missing Ten Days and Spy in the Pantry, is a 1940 British spy film directed by Tim Whelan and starring Rex Harrison, Kaaren Verne, and C. V. France. The screenplay concerns a man in Paris who turns out to be a Doppelganger of a spy operating in the French capital.

== Plot ==
While walking along a Paris street, Englishman Robert Stevens is shot by an unknown assailant, but luckily, he is only struck glancingly and rendered unconscious. When he awakens in Beaujon Hospital, he initially thinks he was injured in an aeroplane crash. His father, Sir James Stevens, confirms he left England in an aeroplane, but 10 days before. However, his father does not believe he cannot remember anything about those missing ten days. (It turns out that Robert is an irresponsible ne'er-do-well who had disappeared before.) Robert decides to find out what happened. His only clue is a note that was found on him signed by "D."

In an office, François is on the telephone telling someone that Barnes was shot and is in the hospital, but should be out soon. Lanson enters. He is worried that the police may be watching Barnes. He instructs François to get results, then returns to London.

When Robert leaves the hospital, he begins making enquiries. François contacts him and directs him to André. André informs him that "Mademoiselle" is concerned that this shooting incident may bring unwanted police notice and end his usefulness. Robert confirms that Mademoiselle is "D". André orders him to rendezvous with Mademoiselle and that Lanson wants him "to keep a closer watch on Captain Victor".

At the appointed place, an attractive blonde orders him to go home with her. An encounter with a policeman over a parking ticket reveals that she is Diane de Geurmantes, and she believes him to be her chauffeur, Barnes. He finds that Barnes' driver's license photograph looks just like him. At Diane's palatial chateau, he encounters other residents, including Denise, a servant, and one of Lanson's spies. He notices a photograph of a man in uniform signed "Victor" in Diane's suite. Denise tells him the captain, Diane's fiancé, is here for dinner.

After dinner, Diane retires, leaving the aged General de Guermantes, Victor, and a British liaison officer to discuss military matters. The next day, the general is taken for an inspection of an extensive secret underground military facility that Lanson is desperate to locate.

Meanwhile, Diane and "Barnes" drive out into the countryside to prepare an outdoor picnic for Victor and the general. However, they first fall into the water while trying to raise a tent, then they are chased up a tree by three dogs. Diane is annoyed at first, but later finds the mishaps amusing.

After the wreckage of Robert's aeroplane and a charred, unidentified body are reported in the newspaper as having been found, Lanson goes to see Sir James. The latter has been warned by British military intelligence to pretend the body is that of his son, but Lanson suspects otherwise and sets a trap, sending a telegram to the chateau addressed to Robert Stevens, telling him to meet his father. Robert falls for it and is held at gunpoint by André, but manages to kill him and escape.

Lanson discovers, purely by chance, that the general has a model of the installation at the chateau. He orders Denise to photograph it, and after learning that André is dead, sends a couple of men to pick up Robert. Robert overpowers Denise, locks her in a closet, and takes her camera. Then, he informs Diane what has been going on. While driving to the authorities, they are captured by Lanson's men, along with Denise's camera. With the information obtained from the film, Lanson decides to plant a bomb on the nightly ammunition train to destroy the installation. Robert manages to disarm the sole guard left behind and, by re-enacting William Tell's shooting of an apple from his son's head (this time with progressively smaller targets atop the henchman), persuades the man to tell all. While chasing the train, Robert and Diane reveal their feelings for each other. They are able to foil the sabotage, though Robert ends up back at the hospital. The woman who shot him initially is brought in; it turns out to have been a case of mistaken identity.

== Cast ==
- Rex Harrison as Robert Stevens
- Kaaren Verne as Diane de Guermantes
- C. V. France as General de Guermantes
- Leo Genn as Lanson
- Joan Marion as Denise
- Anthony Holles as François
- Robert Rendel as Sir James Stevens
- André Morell as Victor
- John Abbott as André
- Mavis Clair as Marie
- Hay Petrie as Benoit
- Frank Atkinson as Pierre

== Critical reception ==
The Radio Times wrote, "as an example of gentlemanly espionage - which only Hitchcock broke with violent genius - it has no suspense, and even the charismatic Harrison exhibits little of his usual flair"; while The New York Times conceded, "preposterous as it is, Missing Ten Days is rattling good fun."
