= Kaaren Verne =

American actress (1918–1967)

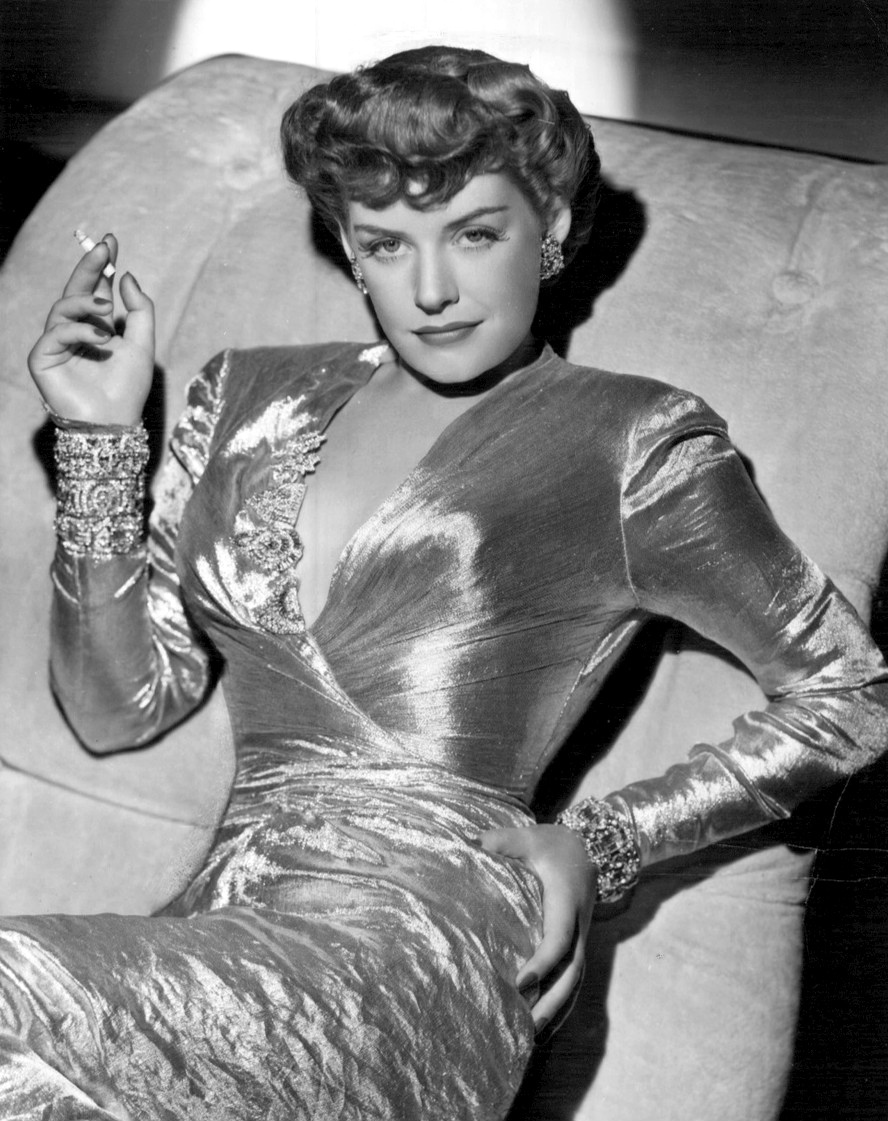
- Verne in 1942
- Born: Ingeborg Greta Katerina Marie-Rose Klinckerfuss; 6 April 1918; Berlin, German Empire
- Died: 23 December 1967 (aged 49); Los Angeles, California, U.S.
- Resting place: Calvary Cemetery, St. Paul, Minnesota
- Other names: Karen Verne; Catherine Young
- Occupation: Actress
- Years active: 1940–1966
- Spouses: Arthur Young (m. 1936; div. 1945) Peter Lorre (m. 1945; div. 1950) James Powers (m. 1951)
- Children: 2

Kaaren Verne (born Ingeborg Greta Katerina Marie-Rose Klinckerfuss; 6 April 1918 – 23 December 1967) was a German and American actress. Sometimes billed as Karen Verne, she was originally a stage actress and member of the Berlin State Theatre.

== Life and career ==
Verne was born in Berlin. Related to the Bechstein family, her first marriage took place when she was 18. She fled the Nazis in 1938 and made her English-language film début in the 1939 British film Ten Days in Paris. When British film production stopped during World War II, she emigrated to the USA.

Verne was married three times, to:

- Musician Arthur Young (30 August 1936 – May 1945; divorced), 1 son
- Actor Peter Lorre (25 May 1945 – 1950, divorced)
- Film historian James Powers (1951 – December 23, 1967, her death)

Verne and James Powers adopted Peter Lorre's daughter following his death in 1964.

An Associated Press news story published January 19, 1955, tells that "Karen Verne" obtained a divorce decree from Harold R. Susman, who was described as "sales director for a clothing manufacturer."

Kaaren Verne remained in films until her death, appearing in Ship of Fools (1965).

== Death ==
Verne died at age 49 of a reported heart ailment in the Hollywood neighborhood of Los Angeles. She was interred in Calvary Cemetery, St. Paul, Minnesota.

== Filmography ==
Films

- Ten Days in Paris (1940) - Diane de Guermantes
- Sky Murder (1940) - Pat Evans
- The Wild Man of Borneo (1941) - Actress in Film Scene (uncredited)
- Underground (1941) - Sylvia Helmuth
- All Through the Night (1942) - Leda Hamilton
- Kings Row (1942) - Elise Sandor
- The Great Impersonation (1942) - Baroness Stephanie Idenbraum
- Sherlock Holmes and the Secret Weapon (1942) - Charlotte Eberli
- The Seventh Cross (1944) - Leni
- The Bad and the Beautiful (1952) - Rosa (uncredited)
- The Story of Three Loves (1953) - Madame Legay (segment "Equilibrium") (uncredited)
- The Juggler (1953) - Woman Mistaken for Hans's Wife (uncredited)
- A Bullet for Joey (1955) - Viveca Hartman
- Outside the Law (1956) - Mrs. Pulenski
- Silk Stockings (1957) - Postwoman (uncredited)
- Ship of Fools (1965) - Frau Lutz
- Madame X (1966) - Nurse Riborg (final film role)

Television

- Fireside Theatre (1954) - Anna
- Crusader (1 episode, 1956) - Mrs. Hawelka
- The Gale Storm Show (1 episode, 1956) - Marya Jezek
- General Electric Theater (1 episode, 1958) - Frau Schuman
- Bronco (1 episode, 1959) - Ilse von Waldenheim
- Michael Shayne (1 episode, 1960) - Flora
- The Twilight Zone (1 episode, 1961) - Innkeeper
- The Untouchables (1 episode, 1961) - Mrs. Schoenbrun—Landlady
- Kraft Suspense Theatre (1 episode, 1965) - Inge
- The Duel at Mont Saint Marie (1966, TV episode)
- 12 O'Clock High (1 episode, 1966) - Woman Refugee
