= Kai Fischer =

German actress (born 1934)

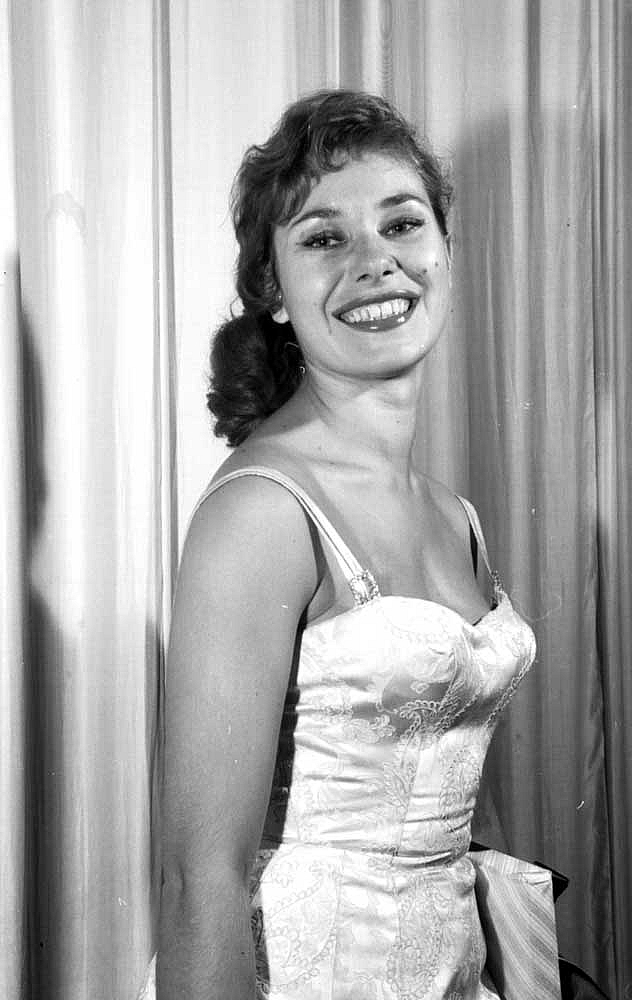
- Born: 18 March 1934; Halle (Saale), Germany
- Occupation: Actress
- Years active: 1955–1999

Kai Fischer (born 18 March 1934) is a German film actress. She appeared in more than 50 films between 1955 and 1999.

== Selected filmography ==
- Operation Sleeping Bag (1955)
- The Bath in the Barn (1956)
- Sand, Love and Salt (1957)
- Für zwei Groschen Zärtlichkeit (Call Girls) (1957)
- The Spessart Inn (1958)
- Heart Without Mercy (1958)
- I Was All His (1958)
- Girls of the Night (1958)
- Madeleine Tel. 13 62 11 (1958)
- Grabenplatz 17 (1958)
- Schwarze Nylons – Heiße Nächte (1958)
- Girls for the Mambo-Bar (1959)
- Uncle Was a Vampire (1959)
- Freddy and the Melody of the Night (1960)
- The Hellfire Club (1960)
- Too Hot to Handle (1960)
- The Bashful Elephant (1961)
- Escape from East Berlin (1962)
- Walt Disney's Wonderful World of Color : The Waltz King (1963)
- Room 13 (1964)
- Bullets Don't Argue (1964)
- The Inn on Dartmoor (1964)
- Die Gentlemen bitten zur Kasse (1966, TV miniseries)
- The Strangler of the Tower (1966)
- Man on the Spying Trapeze (Anónima de asesinos) (1966)
- Maneater of Hydra (1967)
- The Colonel's Nieces (1968)
- Babeck (1968, TV miniseries)
- Salto Mortale (1969-1972, TV series)
- The Goalkeeper's Fear of the Penalty (1972)
- The Serpent's Egg (1977)
- Halbe-Halbe (1977)
- Derrick - Season 5, Episode 10: "Der Spitzel" (1978)
- Lena Rais (1979)
- Banks and Robbers (1983)
