= Love's Carnival (1930 film) =

1930 film

- German film poster
- German: Rosenmontag
- Directed by: Hans Steinhoff
- Written by: Otto Erich Hartleben (play); Ludwig von Wohl; Philipp Lothar Mayring
- Produced by: Bruno Duday
- Starring: Lien Deyers; Mathias Wieman; Eduard von Winterstein
- Cinematography: Werner Brandes
- Music by: Willy Schmidt-Gentner
- Production company: UFA
- Distributed by: UFA
- Release date: 1 September 1930
- Running time: 83 minutes
- Country: Germany
- Language: German

Love's Carnival (German: Rosenmontag) is a 1930 German drama film directed by Hans Steinhoff and starring Lien Deyers, Mathias Wieman, and Eduard von Winterstein. The film is base upon the play by Otto Erich Hartleben. It was shot at the Babelsberg Studios in Berlin. The film's sets were designed by the art director Robert Herlth.

The film was said to exemplify Steinhof's ideology, "a craftsmanlike director with a preference for entertainment films sure to draw an audience, but also for nationalistic, conservative subjects" and even to "glorif[y] aggressive nationalism".

== Plot ==
Due to an intrigue spun by his grandmother and two cousins, the engagement between the officer Hans and his fiancée Traute breaks up. His fiancée is said to have been unfaithful during his 4-week absence on official business. The fabricated rumors allege an affair between Traute and Oberleutnant Grobitzsch.

With the engagement officially ended, Hans becomes engaged to Hildegard, a young lady from a wealthy family. His own family is satisfied with this development, as they have apparently achieved their goal of preventing Hans and Traute from marrying.

Hans accidentally learns that his former fiancée, Traute, was not in fact unfaithful to him, but rather that the whole thing was staged. Furthermore, Hans learns that Traute still loves him.

Hans and Traute get back together; she visits him in his apartment while the annual street carnival is taking place outside. When Traute is alone for a moment, she overhears a loud exchange of words between Hans and Oberleutnant Grobitzsch from the next room. When she hears Oberleutnant Grobitzsch making disparaging remarks about her, Traute abruptly opens the door to the next room and accuses Hans of having broken his officer's word of honour.

The film ends with both of them taking their own lives.

== Cast ==
- Lien Deyers as Traute Reimann
- Mathias Wieman as Hans Rudorff, Leutnant
- Eduard von Winterstein as Oberst von Friese, Kommandeur
- Karl Ludwig Diehl as Oberleutnant Ferndinand von Grobitzsch
- Peter Voß as Harold Hofmann, Oberleutnant
- Harry Halm as Paul von Ramberg, Oberleutnant
- Louis V. Arco as Peter von Remberg, Oberleutnant
- Hubert von Meyerinck as Benno von Klewitz, Leutnant
- Fritz Alberti as Kommerzienrat Berger
- Hanna Waag as Hildegrad Berger, daughter
- Gertrud Arnold
- Lucie Euler
- Lotte Spira as Mrs. Berger
- Heinz Glahn as Franz
- Paul Heidemann
- Erich Kestin
- Karl Platen
- Alexander Sascha as Hugo von Marschall

== See also ==
- Rosenmontag (1924)
- Love's Carnival (1955)
