= Must We Get Divorced? (1933 film) =

1933 film

- Directed by: Hans Behrendt
- Written by: Hans Behrendt; Ernst Marischka (book); Hans von Wolzogen
- Produced by: Hermann Rosenfeld; Ludwig Scheer
- Starring: Else Elster; Aribert Mog; Iván Petrovich
- Cinematography: Otto Kanturek; Bruno Timm
- Music by: Mischa Spoliansky
- Production company: Reichsliga-Film
- Distributed by: Union-Film
- Release date: 26 June 1933
- Running time: 79 minutes
- Country: Germany
- Language: German

Must We Get Divorced? (German: Muß man sich gleich scheiden lassen) is a 1933 German comedy film directed by Hans Behrendt and starring Else Elster, Aribert Mog and Iván Petrovich. It was shot at the Emelka Studios of Bavaria Film in Munich. The film's sets were designed by the art director Max Knaake.

== Cast ==
- Else Elster as Anni Lüders
- Aribert Mog as Gottfried Lüders
- Iván Petrovich as Edgar Radek
- S.Z. Sakall as Professor Friedrich Hornung
- Martha Ziegler as Irmgard
- Inez Allegri as Olly Rode
- Lotte Lang as Lissi Dorfmüller
- Liesl Karlstadt as Wirtschafterin bei Hornung
- Georg Henrich as Judge
- Kurt Horwitz as Anni's Lawyer
- Josef Eichheim as Gerichtsdiener Hubermann
- Herbert Langhofer as Lemke
- Beppo Brem as Edgar's Trainer
- O.E. Hasse as Ein Friseur
- Max Schreck as Kongresspräsident
- Richard Ryen as Gottfried's Lawyer

== Bibliography ==
- Klaus, Ulrich J. Deutsche Tonfilme: Jahrgang 1933. Klaus-Archiv, 1988.
- Parish, James Robert (1977). Film Actors Guide: Western Europe. Scarecrow Press. ISBN 978-0-8108-1044-0.
