= Underground (1941 film) =

1941 film by Vincent Sherman

- Directed by: Vincent Sherman
- Written by: Edwin Justus Mayer; Oliver H. P. Garrett; Charles Grayson
- Produced by: Bryan Foy
- Starring: Jeffrey Lynn; Philip Dorn
- Cinematography: Sidney Hickox
- Edited by: Thomas Pratt
- Music by: Adolph Deutsch
- Production company: Warner Bros. Pictures
- Distributed by: Warner Bros. Pictures
- Release date: June 28, 1941
- Running time: 95 minutes
- Country: United States
- Language: English

Underground is a 1941 American war thriller film directed by Vincent Sherman and starring Jeffrey Lynn, Philip Dorn and Kaaren Verne. Focusing on the German Nazi Resistance opposing the Nazis in World War II, Lynn and Dorn play two brothers initially on opposite sides. It was produced and distributed by Warner Bros. Pictures.

== Plot ==
Kurt Franken returns from his time at the front, minus an arm but still the fervent, patriotic Nazi that he was when he left. His brother, Eric, is high up in the resistance and regularly broadcasts on a secret radio. They argue, at first, but over time Kurt sees things differently. Eric eventually runs afoul of the Gestapo and is scheduled for execution. As he is led to the guillotine, he hears his brother's voice on loudspeakers positioned through the prison.

== Cast ==
- Jeffrey Lynn as Kurt Franken
- Philip Dorn as Eric Franken
- Kaaren Verne as Sylvia Helmuth
- Mona Maris as Fräulein Gessner
- Peter Whitney as Alex Schumann
- Martin Kosleck as Colonel Heller
- Erwin Kalser as Dr. Albert Franken
- Ilka Grüning as Frau Franken
- Frank Reicher as Professor Hugo Baumer
- Egon Brecher as Herr Director of the Chemical Institute
- Ludwig Stössel as Herr Gustav Müller
- Hans Schumm as Heller's Aide
- Wolfgang Zilzer as Walter Hoffman
- Roland Varno as Ernst Demmler
- Henry Brandon as Josef Rolf
- Henry Rowland as Paul
- Ernst Hauessermann as Rudi
- Lotte Palfi Andor as Greta Rolf
- Wilhelm von Brincken as Capt. Bornsdorff
- Hans Conried as Herman
- Lester Allen as Herr Krantz
- Lisa Golm as Ella
- Louis V. Arco as Otto
- Louis Adlon as Karl
- Henry Victor as Gestapo Agent
- Lionel Royce as Concentration Camp Captain
- Paul Panzer as Janitor
- Ernö Verebes as Maxel's Headwaiter
- Roland Drew as Gestapo Agent
- Ludwig Hardt as Tobacco Clerk

== Adaptation ==
The Charles Martin Playhouse radio program presented an adaptation of the film on September 18, 1942. Claude Rains starred in the broadcast.

== Bibliography ==
- Britton, Wesley (2005-06-30). Beyond Bond: Spies in Fiction and Film. Bloomsbury Publishing USA. ISBN 978-0-275-98556-1.
- Dolan, Edward F. (1985). Hollywood Goes to War. Hamlyn. ISBN 978-0-600-50053-7.
