= Gloria Whitney =

American singer

- Born: Florence Joan Healey; 11 February 1911
- Died: 1 June 1974 (aged 63)
- Genres: Vocal jazz, jazz blues, torch songs, swing, blues
- Occupation: Singer
- Instrument: Vocals
- Years active: 1931–1942
- Label: Brunswick

Gloria Whitney was the stage name of Florence Joan Healey (26 February 1911 – June 1974), an American big band vocalist who flourished from about 1931 to about 1942.

== Career ==
Whitney, under the stage name "Onions Healy" (surname was also spelled as "Healey"), sang with (i) Nils T. Granlund around 1935 and (ii) Texas Guinan's Chorus around 1935, when Ruby Keeler did. In 1936, she sang with Vincent Lopez. In 1938, Whitney was a featured singer with the sweet-swing style orchestra of Dick Messner, who performed regionally around Pennsylvania, New Jersey, and New York. Between 1938 and 1939, Whitney sang with Russ Morgan, which included a performance with Morgan in the 1939 short film, Russ Morgan and His Orchestra. She also recorded 6 records with Morgan.

In 1940, she married band leader Ted Black (né Theodore Aboussleman; 1902–1969). Ted Black began using his stage name as early as 1931, when he was leading an orchestra on WOR radio, and 1933, when he was leading his orchestra at the Village Barn – in the basement at 52 West 8th Street in the West Village section of Greenwich Village, Manhattan, between 6th Avenue and Washington Square West. Ted Black told a journalist in 1933 that Aboussleman meant "Father of Solomon" in his native country, Syria.

In July 1941, Gloria M. Whitney began singing with Gabby Clarence Stroud (1907–1973) (formerly of the Stroud Twins). Also in 1941, she married bandleader Michael Loring (aka Miguel Loring; né Samuel Isaack Mirviss; 1908–1993). Also, by July 1941, Whitney was performing three times a day on WHN radio, New York City.

In 1942, Whitney, with U.S. vocalist Phyllis Cameron (maiden; born 4 July 1908, San Juan, Puerto Rico), sang with casino bands in Rio de Janeiro, namely the Francisco José Ferreira Filho's band at the Cassino Atlântico.

In 1945, she married Bucky Buckner. They separated in 1946.

She died in Brooklyn, New York, aged 64.

== Humanitarianism ==
In 1937, the British War Relief Society named Whitney "Thumbs Up Girl". Whitney henceforth, through performances, promoted the Society until the end of World War II.

== Family ==
Whitney was born 26 February 1911, in Renovo, Pennsylvania, to Walter Fay Healey (1883–1951) and Mary Mae Walls (maiden; 1884–1964).

Philip "Flip" Black, the producer, is her son, who, in 1996, was head of A&R Creative Services Division of Music Sales Group. Florence's sister, Bernice Margaret Healey (1917–1990) was a soprano vocalist who began singing on radio broadcasts as early as 1934.
