= The Cross of Lorraine =

1943 film by Tay Garnett

- Directed by: Tay Garnett
- Screenplay by: Ring Lardner Jr. Michael Kanin; Robert Hardy Andrews; Alexander Esway
- Story by: Robert Aisner; Lilo Dammert
- Based on: A Thousand Shall Fall; 1941 novel by Hans Habe
- Produced by: Edwin H. Knopf
- Starring: Jean-Pierre Aumont; Gene Kelly
- Cinematography: Sidney Wagner
- Edited by: Dan Milner
- Music by: Bronislau Kaper
- Production company: Metro-Goldwyn-Mayer
- Distributed by: Loew's Inc.
- Release date: November 12, 1943
- Running time: 90 minutes
- Country: United States
- Language: English
- Budget: $1,010,000
- Box office: $1,248,000

The Cross of Lorraine is a 1943 Metro-Goldwyn-Mayer war film about French prisoners of war escaping a German prison camp and joining the French Resistance. Directed by Tay Garnett, starring Jean-Pierre Aumont and Gene Kelly, the film was partly based on Hans Habe's 1941 novel A Thousand Shall Fall. The title refers to the French Cross of Lorraine, which was the symbol of the French Resistance and the Free French Forces chosen by Charles de Gaulle in 1942.

== Plot ==
At the start of World War II, Frenchmen from all walks of life enlist or are drafted. Defeated by the invading Germans in 1940, Marshal Philippe Pétain signs a peace agreement and the troops surrender. However, instead of being repatriated to their homes, a group of soldiers are transported to a brutal prison camp. The men receive solace from Father Sebastian (Sir Cedric Hardwicke), a priest who was also in the army and who counsels them wisely, but he is eventually killed. Most of the men resist as best they can. Duval (Hume Cronyn), collaborates with their jailers to get an easier life, and tries to recruit Paul (Jean-Pierre Aumont). One night, the prisoners shove Duval into the yard and trigger the alarm. The guards shoot him by mistake. In response, the Commandant has every fourth prisoner executed. He has Paul watch it in his office, and explains the Nazi plan for indoctrinating the next generations. He shows him Victor (Gene Kelly), in his cell, and observes, "There is no man we cannot break." Victor has indeed been broken by the vicious treatment he has received in solitary.

Paul takes Duval's old job with an eye to aiding his fellow prisoners. Part of his work entails helping Sergeant Berger smuggle perfume, silk garments and other luxuries for Lieutenant Schmidt from the hospital over the border into Occupied France. The goods are hidden under a soldier pretending to be an actual patient.

Eventually Paul helps the 15 men in his barracks to escape, hidden among 150 Alsatians who are being repatriated. Camp roll call will soon reveal the deception. The doctor chooses to stay behind, Victor is incapacitated by fear, and Paul won't leave without him. He feels guilty because Victor and the others like him had wanted to fight, and he had not seen that they were right.

The doctor sedates Victor, and they put him in the soldier's place. Paul asks the doctor for a scalpel, a weapon. "It's hard to believe you're the same Paul." "I'm not." The doctor warns him he cannot expect any help on the outside. He does not. The truck passes the border checkpoint, but they are soon pursued. Paul kills Sergeant Berger and helps a despairing Victor across country for several days. They witness a boy shooting a German motorcyclist. He asks them "What cross do you bear?" When they don't reply "The Cross of Lorraine", he prepares to shoot them. Then Victor collapses, revealing the lashes on his chest. The boy tells them the Americans have landed in North Africa and takes them to safety in René's home in Cardignan, where they meet other friends and plan to join General Cartier's army in the mountains. Paul promises to get the still-frightened Victor to North Africa.

The Nazis arrive to conscript 50 men from the village (population 374) for labor camps in Germany. Paul tells the assembled people that the promises of good treatment are lies and is shot in the arm. Victor, outraged, kills the senior officer, and the village explodes. The people overwhelm the Germans who flee. Knowing they will return, René's mother leads the call to burn Cardignan to the ground to keep it out of German hands, and they head en masse into the mountains to join General Cartier. The film ends with the final bars of La Marseillaise and the French flag bearing the Cross of Lorraine.

== Cast ==
- Jean-Pierre Aumont as Paul
- Gene Kelly as Victor
- Sir Cedric Hardwicke as Father Sebastian
- Richard Whorf as François
- Joseph Calleia as Rodriguez
- Peter Lorre as Sergeant Berger
- Hume Cronyn as Duval
- William Roy as Louis
- Tonio Selwart as Major Bruhl
- Jack Lambert as Jacques
- Wallace Ford as Pierre
- Donald Curtis as Marcel
- Jack Edwards, Jr. as René
- Richard Ryen as Lieutenant Schmidt
- Frederick Giermann as Corporal Daxer

== Production ==
The Cross of Lorraine is one of the many Hollywood World War II propaganda films showing life in occupied Europe, with the purpose of explaining to an American audience why US involvement in the European war was just as important as the war against the Japanese in the Pacific.

The film is partly based on the German refugee author Hans Habe's autobiographical Ob Tausend fallen (A Thousand Shall Fall) from 1941, about his war experiences fighting in the French Foreign Legion against his former homeland in 1940, being captured and then escaping from the German prison camp.

A number of German, Austrian, French and Dutch actors, who had fled Europe because of the war, participate in the film, not only Peter Lorre, Jean-Pierre Aumont, Richard Ryen and Frederick Giermann, but also several of those who participate in minor roles and as extras.

The Cross of Lorraine was the second Metro-Goldwyn-Mayer production about the French Resistance, the first being Reunion in France, released in 1942.

== Box office ==
According to MGM records the film earned $585,000 in the US and Canada and $663,000 elsewhere resulting in a loss of $179,000.
