= Bomber's Moon =

1943 film

- Theatrical poster
- Directed by: Edward Ludwig (as "Charles Fuhr"); Harold D. Schuster (as "Charles Fuhr"); John Brahm (uncredited); Robert Florey (2nd unit aerial sequences)
- Written by: Kenneth Gamet (Screenwriter); Aubrey Wisberg (Screenwriter); Leonard Lee (story)
- Produced by: Sol M. Wurtzel
- Starring: George Montgomery; Annabella; Kent Taylor
- Cinematography: Lucien Ballard
- Edited by: Robert Fritch
- Music by: David Buttolph
- Distributed by: 20th Century-Fox
- Release date: August 6, 1943
- Running time: 67 mins.
- Country: United States
- Language: English

Bomber's Moon is a 1943 American wartime propaganda film, produced by 20th Century Fox, based on an unpublished magazine serial "Bomber's Moon" by Leonard Lee.

== Plot ==
Captain Jeff Dakin (George Montgomery) is shot down over Germany on a bombing raid. He sees his brother, Danny (Richard Graham), serving on the same aircraft, shot dead as he parachutes out of the stricken aircraft. Imprisoned in a camp, Dakin conspires with Alexandra "Alec" Zorich (Annabella), a beautiful Russian doctor, and Captain Paul Husnik (Kent Taylor), a Czech resistance leader, to mount an escape. They escape during an air raid and make their way towards safety, but the Czech is not who he seems.

Husnik is really Gestapo officer Paul von Block, who wants to get Alec to lead him to the leaders of the Czech underground movement. Killing the underground leader, von Block summons the Gestapo, but Dakin overpowers him and together with Alec, goes on the run. Reaching the Netherlands, Dakin learns that his bomber is now repaired, with the Nazis planning a mysterious flight to England. Disguised as a German soldier, Dakin finds out his brother's killer, Major. Von Streicher (Martin Kosleck), is to pilot the aircraft on a mission to kill Prime Minister Winston Churchill. Stealing a German aircraft, Dakin exacts his revenge by shooting down Von Streicher. Landing in England, he is reunited with Alec, who has made her way there.

== Cast ==
- George Montgomery as Jeffrey Dakin
- Annabella as Alexandra "Alec" Zorich
- Kent Taylor as Paul von Block
- Walter Kingsford as Professor Mueller
- Martin Kosleck as Luftwaffe Maj. von Streicher
- Dennis Hoey as Gestapo Col. von Grunow
- Robert Barrat as Ernst
- Leon Tyler as Karl
- Lionel Royce as Derbitz
- Victor Kilian as Henryk van Seeler

With only a limited budget, all aerial sequences in Bomber's Moon, were completed with special effects and model work, such as this one of a Lockheed Hudson. (Screenshot)

== Production ==
Although a low-budget production, entirely filmed at the 20th Century Fox studio lot, a total of six directors worked on the film. Shortly after completing Bomber's Moon, George Montgomery enlisted in the United States Army Air Corps and did not appear in another film until the 1946 20th Century Fox production Three Little Girls in Blue. French actress Annabella also filmed Tonight We Raid Calais (1943) and 13 Rue Madeleine (1947).

== Reception ==
Strictly a "B" film, Bomber's Moon was not well received. The contemporary review in The New York Times succinctly summed it up as "shoddy" and "... second-rate Hollywood."
