= Berlin Correspondent =

1942 film

- Directed by: Eugene Forde
- Produced by: Bryan Foy
- Cinematography: Virgil Miller
- Edited by: Fred Allen
- Distributed by: 20th Century Fox
- Release date: September 11, 1942
- Running time: 70 minutes
- Country: United States
- Language: English

Berlin Correspondent is a 1942 American war drama film.

== Plot ==
An American radio correspondent is reporting from within Nazi Germany. His principal source of information is an elderly philatelist. His reports prove so embarrassing to the regime that Colonel von Rau sends his own fiancée, Karen Hauen, to compromise the reporter. As the philatelist is sent off to a concentration camp, it develops that she and the reporter are falling for each other, and the elderly source was actually her own father.

== Cast ==
- Virginia Gilmore as Karen Hauen
- Dana Andrews as Bill Roberts
- Mona Maris as Carla
- Martin Kosleck as Colonel von Rau
- Sig Ruman as Dr. Dietrich
- Kurt Katch as Weiner
- Erwin Kalser as Mr. Rudolph Hauen
- Torben Meyer as Manager
- William Edmunds as Hans Gruber
- Hans Schumm as Gunther
- Leonard Mudie as George, English Prisoner
- Hans von Morhart as The Actor
- Curt Furburg as Doctor
- Henry Rowland as Pilot
- Christian Rub as Prisoner
