= Behind Monastery Walls =

Behind Monastery Walls may refer to:

- Behind Monastery Walls (1928 film), a 1928 German silent drama film
- Behind Monastery Walls (1952 film), a 1952 West German drama film
