= The Fighting Kentuckian =

1949 film by George Waggner

- Original cinema poster
- Directed by: George Waggner
- Written by: George Waggner
- Produced by: John Wayne
- Starring: John Wayne; Vera Ralston; Philip Dorn; Oliver Hardy; Marie Windsor; John Howard; Hugo Haas; Grant Withers; Odette Myrtil; Paul Fix
- Cinematography: Lee Garmes
- Edited by: Richard L. Van Enger
- Music by: George Antheil
- Production company: Republic Pictures
- Distributed by: Republic Pictures
- Release date: September 15, 1949 (United States)
- Running time: 100 minutes
- Country: United States
- Language: English
- Budget: $1,334,664
- Box office: $1,550,000 or $1,750,518 (as at 27 March 1953)

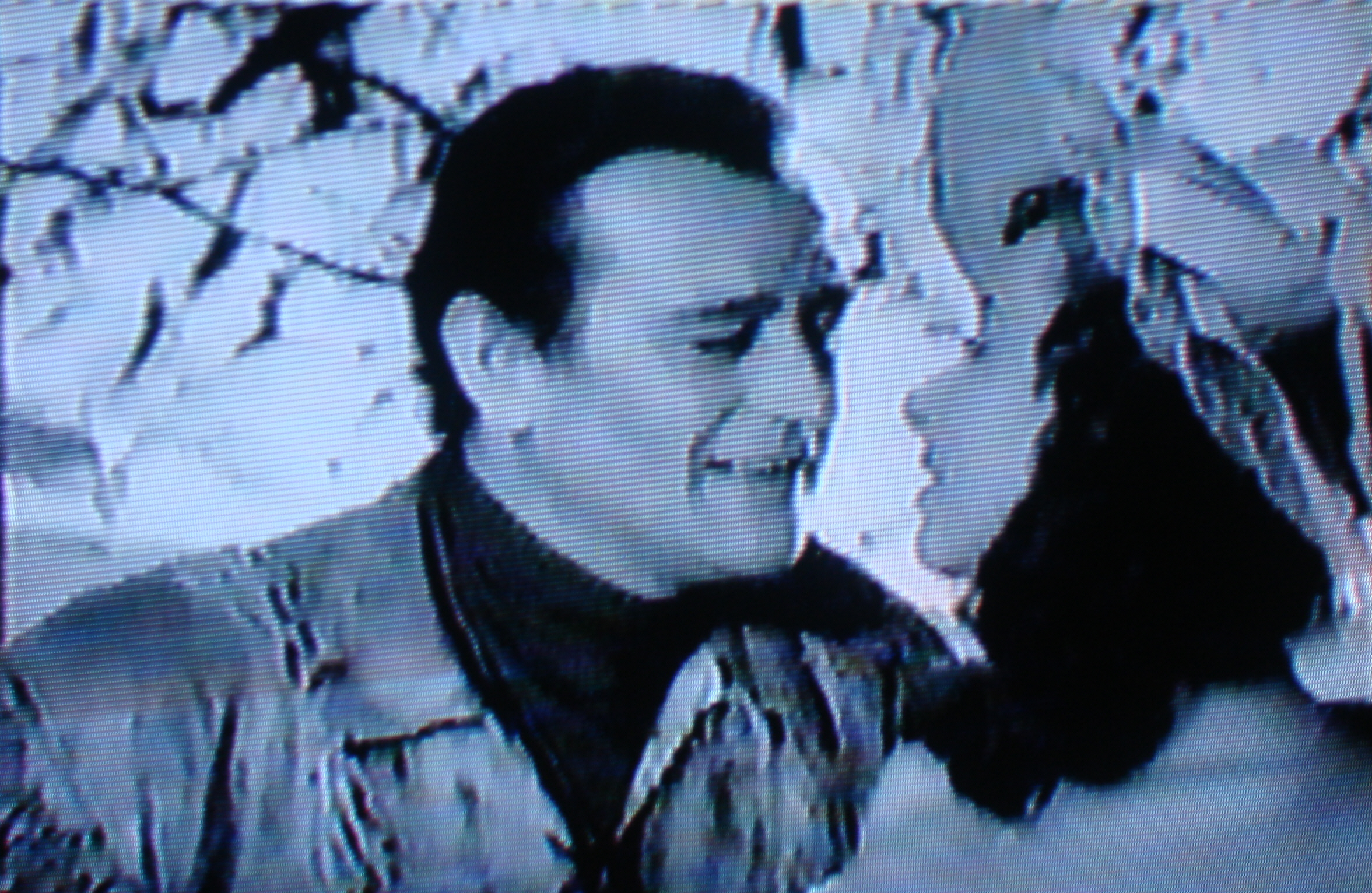
John Wayne and Vera Ralston in The Fighting Kentuckian (1949)

The Fighting Kentuckian is a 1949 American adventure Western film written and directed by George Waggner and starring John Wayne, who also produced the film. The supporting cast featured Vera Ralston, Philip Dorn, Oliver Hardy (of Laurel & Hardy) portraying Wayne's portly sidekick, Marie Windsor, John Howard, Hugo Haas, Grant Withers, and Odette Myrtil.

== Plot ==
Returning home from the War of 1812, John Breen, a Kentucky militiaman, falls in love with French exile Fleurette de Marchand. He discovers a plot to steal the land on which Fleurette's exiles plan to settle. Breen is mistaken for a land surveyor and is presented with a theodolite, and sets out with Willie to look as if they are surveying (they do not actually know what to do). A further pretense occurs when Breen sits on stage with a group of fiddlers and feigns being able to play.

Throughout the film, Breen's soldiers sing:

Only 600 miles more to go (2x)
And if we can just get lucky
We will end up in Kentucky
Only 600 miles more to go.

When the song is first heard, 800 miles (1,300 km) remain (the tune is "She'll Be Coming 'Round the Mountain").

== Cast ==
- John Wayne as John Breen
- Vera Ralston as Fleurette de Marchand
- Philip Dorn as Col. Georges Géraud
- Oliver Hardy as Willie Paine
- Marie Windsor as Ann Logan
- John Howard as Blake Randolph
- Hugo Haas as Gen. Paul de Marchand
- Grant Withers as George Hayden
- Odette Myrtil as Madame de Marchand
- Paul Fix as Beau Merritt
- Mae Marsh as Sister Hattie
- Jack Pennick as Capt. Dan Carroll
- Mickey Simpson as Jacques (wrestler/Marie's father)
- Fred Graham as Carter Ward
- Mabelle Koenig as Marie
- Hank Worden as Abner Todd (uncredited)
- Fred Aldrich as Militiaman (uncredited)
- Richard Alexander as Militiaman (uncredited)
- Hank Bell as Militiaman at Festival (uncredited)

== Historical setting ==
The story is set in Alabama in 1818, including the city of Demopolis, which was founded by Bonapartists. The Bonapartists had been exiled from France, after the defeat of Napoleon I at the Battle of Waterloo. Congress authorized the sale of four townships in the Alabama Territory in March 1817 at two dollars per acre, and Marengo County was created on February 7, 1818, from lands that had been taken from the Choctaw Nation, under the Treaty of Fort St. Stephens. It was named after Spinetta Marengo, Italy, where Napoleon defeated Austria in 1800, at the Battle of Marengo. The county seat, Linden, Alabama, was named after Hohenlinden, Bavaria, where Napoleon won another victory against the Austrians. The Bonapartist colony did not succeed overall, in part due to surveyance issues that contribute to the plot of the film and in part due to practical difficulties in establishing the vineyards.

== Production notes ==
This is one of only a handful of times that Hardy worked without partner Stan Laurel, after they had teamed up as Laurel and Hardy. It was the only time that Hardy appeared in a film with John Wayne, though the two had worked together onstage a year earlier, in a touring charity production of What Price Glory?, starring Wayne, Ward Bond, and Maureen O'Hara, and directed by John Ford. Rebroadcast by Arte 1 in February 2017, the film credits celebrated composer Georges Antheil (1900–1959) with the music (background score including, among things, stirring "variations" on the "Marseillaise").

The film was the second one produced by John Wayne for Republic Pictures. It was stuntman Chuck Roberson's first work with John Wayne; Roberson frequently doubled Wayne throughout his career. Wayne desired a French actress for the lead role and considered Danielle Darrieux, Simone Simon, and Corinne Calvet, but was forced to use Republic Studio's Vera Ralston, causing other Czech and Austrian actors to be cast to match Ralston's accent.

The Fighting Kentuckian is one of only four films in which John Wayne wore a buckskin suit with a coonskin cap, the others being the 1930 widescreen epic The Big Trail (in the Grand Canyon sequence shot on location), Allegheny Uprising (1939), and as Davy Crockett in the concluding battle footage in The Alamo (1960). Allegheny Uprising and The Fighting Kentuckian, shot only a decade apart (as opposed to three decades apart, as is the case with The Big Trail and The Alamo), are often confused with each other because of Wayne's identical buckskin outfit and coonskin hat worn throughout both pictures.

== See also ==
- Oliver Hardy filmography
- John Wayne filmography
