= Escape in the Desert =

1945 film

- Theatrical release poster
- Directed by: Edward A. Blatt
- Screenplay by: Marvin Borowsky; Thomas Job
- Produced by: Alex Gottlieb
- Starring: Jean Sullivan; Philip Dorn; Irene Manning; Helmut Dantine; Alan Hale, Sr. Samuel S. Hinds
- Cinematography: Robert Burks
- Edited by: Owen Marks
- Music by: Adolph Deutsch
- Production company: Warner Bros. Pictures
- Distributed by: Warner Bros. Pictures
- Release date: May 1, 1945
- Running time: 79 minutes
- Country: United States
- Language: English

Escape in the Desert is a 1945 American drama film directed by Edward A. Blatt and written by Marvin Borowsky and Thomas Job. The film stars Jean Sullivan, Philip Dorn, Irene Manning, Helmut Dantine, Alan Hale, Sr. and Samuel S. Hinds. The film was released by Warner Bros. Pictures on May 1, 1945. The opening credits say that Escape in the Desert is adapted “from a play by Robert E Sherwood” without identifying the work: The Petrified Forest. Warner Bros. had previously adapted Sherwood's play for the screen in 1936. Working titles for the film included Strangers in Our Midst and Men Without Destiny.

== Plot ==
The action takes place in the southwestern United States late in World War II. Four POWs from Nazi Germany escape American custody and eventually wind up taking over a small gas station/hotel in the desert. They plan to obtain a fueled-up vehicle and flee the country. A Dutch military pilot traveling through America, on his way to fight in the Pacific, is initially mistaken by some locals as one of the Nazis. Eventually, however, he helps lead the resistance against the Germans.

== Cast ==
- Jean Sullivan as Jane
- Philip Dorn as Philip Artveld
- Irene Manning as Lora Tedder
- Helmut Dantine as Capt. Becker
- Alan Hale, Sr. as Dr. Orville Tedder
- Samuel S. Hinds as Gramp
- Bill Kennedy as Hank Albright
- Kurt Kreuger as Lt. Von Kleist
- Rudolph Anders as Hoffman
- Hans Schumm as Klaus
- Blayney Lewis as Danny

== Reception ==
In his May 12, 1945 review, New York Times critic Bosley Crowther compared the film unfavorably with its predecessor:“Aside from the Arizona locale and a few vague theatrical landmarks, there is nothing about this picture to remind you of the play or previous film. The original found dramatic conflict between a notorious gangster "on the lam" and a disillusioned intellectual who was a veteran of the first World War. The present film sets a young Dutch flier who is hitch-hiking across the United States against a band of Nazi soldiers who have escaped from a desert prison camp. And whereas the former had something of depth and perception to it, the present is just a melodrama of the sock-and-bust-'em school. Perhaps that is all the Warners ever meant that it should be... only Samuel S. Hinds as a genial "sourdough" has real attractiveness. The climax finds the Nazis shooting it out with a sheriff's posse in Western style. But that only serves to clinch the genre of the picture, which is suspected from the start.”
