= Wayne Heffley =

American television and film actor

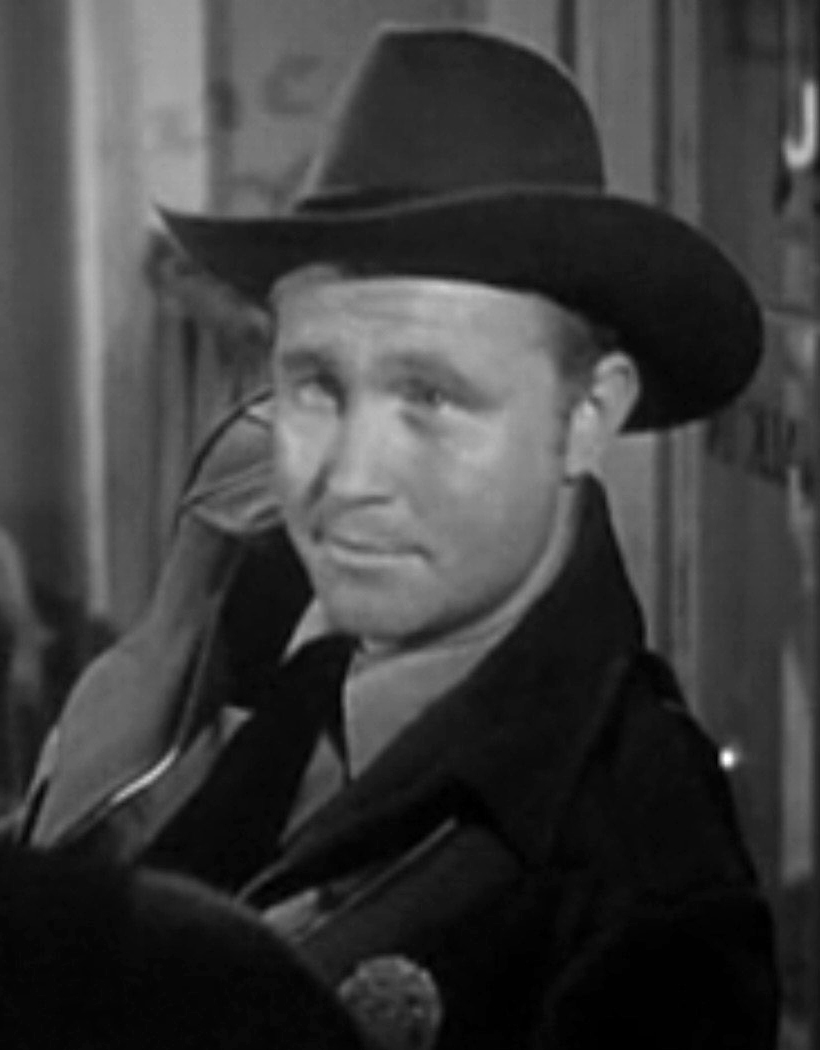
- Heffley in Man with a Camera (1958)
- Born: Arnold Wayne Heffley Jr. July 15, 1927; Bakersfield, California, U.S.
- Died: November 19, 2008 (aged 81); Montrose, California, U.S.
- Occupations: Film, television actor
- Years active: 1952–2006
- Relatives: Jason Becker (grandson)

Wayne Heffley (July 15, 1927 – November 19, 2008) was an American television and film actor, known for the role of Vern Scofield on Days of Our Lives, as well as over 100 other roles.

== Biography ==
Heffley co-starred in the 1958 film Submarine Seahawk alongside Brett Halsey and John Bentley. He appeared in S3 E14 of "The Wild, Wild West" as Deputy in "The Night of the Iron Fist" which aired 12/6/1967. Heffley also had several theatre roles. He died of kidney failure in 2008.

He was guitarist Jason Becker's maternal grandfather.

== Filmography ==
Year	Title	Role	Notes
1954	The Human Jungle	Hood	Uncredited
1955	The Eternal Sea	Commanding Officer	Uncredited
1958	Submarine Seahawk	Commander Dean Stoker	
1959	Alfred Hitchcock Presents	Prosecutor	Season 4 Episode 31: "Your Witness"
1959	The Trap	Lou Brann	Uncredited
1959	Crime and Punishment U.S.A.	Rafe	
1957-1959	Highway Patrol	Officer Dennis	television series, 1955–1959; regular
1959	Battle Flame	Teach	
1960	Spartacus	Slave Guard	Uncredited
1960	Bat Masterson	Jeff Taylor	S2E21 "Cattle and Canes"
1960	Wanted Dead or Alive (TV series)	Homer	season 2 episode 22 (The Partners)
1961	The Outsider	Corporal Johnson	
1961	The Twilight Zone (TV series)	2nd Officer Wyatt	
1962	Birdman of Alcatraz	Guard	Uncredited
1963	A Gathering of Eagles	Radar Navigator	Uncredited
1966	Voyage to the Bottom of the Sea	Seaview Doctor	Season 2 Episode 16: "Deadly Creature Below!"
1967	Gunn	Police Sergeant Ashford	
1967	The Invaders	Jim Walton	Credited as Deputy episode Nightmare
1968	Maryjane	Ice Cream Company Manager	
1971	Johnny Got His Gun	Captain	
1966-1972	Bonanza	Bert / Andy	television series, 1959–1973; 2-time guest-appearance
1974	The Streets of San Francisco	Detective Steiglitz	television series, 1972–1977; guest-appearance
1974	Kojak	Detective Steiglitz	television series, 1973–1978; guest-appearance
1974-1975	Little House on the Prairie	Mr. Kennedy	television series, 1974–1984; 3-time guest-appearance
1976	King Kong	Air Force General	
1976	The Waltons	Carl Muntner	television series, 1971–1981; guest-appearance
1977	Roots	Telegrapher	television miniseries
1977	Orca	Priest	
1978	Uncle Joe Shannon	Store Manager	
1977-1979	Barnaby Jones	Carl Larkin / Sheriff Carson / Dr. Merlow	television series, 1973–1980; 3-time guest-appearance
1979	The White Shadow	Coach Stanley Harper	television series, 1978–1981, guest appearance
1982	Hill Street Blues	Gerson	television series, 1981–1987; guest-appearance
1982	The Best Little Whorehouse in Texas	TV Station Manager	
1983	Testament	Police Chief	
1984	Airwolf	Lieutenant Grodin	television series, 1984–1986; 2-time guest-appearance
1985	Trapper John, M.D.	Chaplain	television series, 1979–1986; guest-appearance
1986	Matlock	Wayne Cornell	television series, 1986–1995; guest-appearance
1987	Black Widow	Etta's Husband	
1987	Beyond the Next Mountain	Postal Clerk	
1990	Evening Shade	Vernon	television series, 1990–1994; guest-appearance
1989-2006	Days of Our Lives	Vern Scofield	television series, 1965-still; regular role
