= Arthur Walsh (actor) =

American actor

- Born: June 15, 1923; Canada
- Died: September 24, 1995 (aged 72); North Hollywood, California, U.S.
- Occupations: Actor; dancer
- Years active: 1943–1966

Arthur Walsh (June 15, 1923 – September 24, 1995) was a Canadian actor and dancer, who appeared in American films during the 1940s and 1950s. His first credited film appearance was Blonde Fever (1944). He continued to act throughout the late 1950s, making a final appearance in the film The 30 Foot Bride of Candy Rock (1959). He made a memorable guest appearance on I Love Lucy in 1953 as Arthur "King Cat" Walsh. In 1966, he appeared on an episode of The Phyllis Diller Show. He died of natural causes in 1995 in North Hollywood, California, aged 72.

== Partial filmography ==
- Stage Door Canteen (1943) - Jitterbugging Soldier (uncredited)
- See Here, Private Hargrove (1944) - Private Wearing Glasses (uncredited)
- Two Girls and a Sailor (1944) - Lonesome Soldier (uncredited)
- Blonde Fever (1944) - Willie
- Groovie Movie (1944, Short) - Himself (uncredited)
- This Man's Navy (1945) - Cadet Rayshek
- Main Street After Dark (1945) - Dancing Sailor (uncredited)
- Anchors Aweigh (1945) - Sailor (uncredited)
- Ziegfeld Follies (1945) - Telegraph Boy ('A Sweepstakes Ticket') (uncredited)
- What Next, Corporal Hargrove? (1945) - Ellerton
- They Were Expendable (1945) - Seaman Jones
- Plantation Melodies (1945, Short)
- A Letter for Evie (1946) - Bobby (uncredited)
- Easy to Wed (1946) - Newspaper Office Boy (uncredited)
- Courage of Lassie (1946) - Freddie Crews (uncredited)
- No Leave, No Love (1946) - Nick
- My Darling Clementine (1946) - Hotel Clerk (uncredited)
- Sarge Goes to College (1947) - Arthur Walsh
- Good News (1947) - Dancer (uncredited)
- Big City (1948) - Boogie-Woogie Fan (uncredited)
- On an Island with You (1948) - 2nd Assistant Director (uncredited)
- You Gotta Stay Happy (1948) - Milton Goodrich
- Command Decision (1948) - Photographer (uncredited)
- Little Women (1949) - Lad Jo Refuses to Dance with (uncredited)
- Flame of Youth (1949) - Hector
- Ranger of Cherokee Strip (1949) - Will Rogers
- Battleground (1949) - G.I. (uncredited)
- Gunmen of Abilene (1950) - Tim Johnson
- When Willie Comes Marching Home (1950) - Soldier at Dance (uncredited)
- Mr. Imperium (1951) - Specialty: California Cowboy (uncredited)
- Street Bandits (1951) - Arnold 'Blackie' Black
- Radar Men from the Moon (1952, Short) - Motorcycle Cop [Ch. 11] (uncredited)
- The Fabulous Senorita (1952) - Pete (uncredited)
- The Lady Wants Mink (1953) - Motorcycle Cop (uncredited)
- Three Sailors and a Girl (1953) - Sailor (uncredited)
- Affair in Reno (1957) - Bellhop (uncredited)
- The Last Hurrah (1958) - Frank Skeffington Jr.
- Battle Flame (1959) - Nawlins
- The 30 Foot Bride of Candy Rock (1959) - Lieutenant (uncredited)
- The Gene Krupa Story (1959) - Minor Role (uncredited)
