= Richard Whorf =

American actor, director and author (1906–1966)

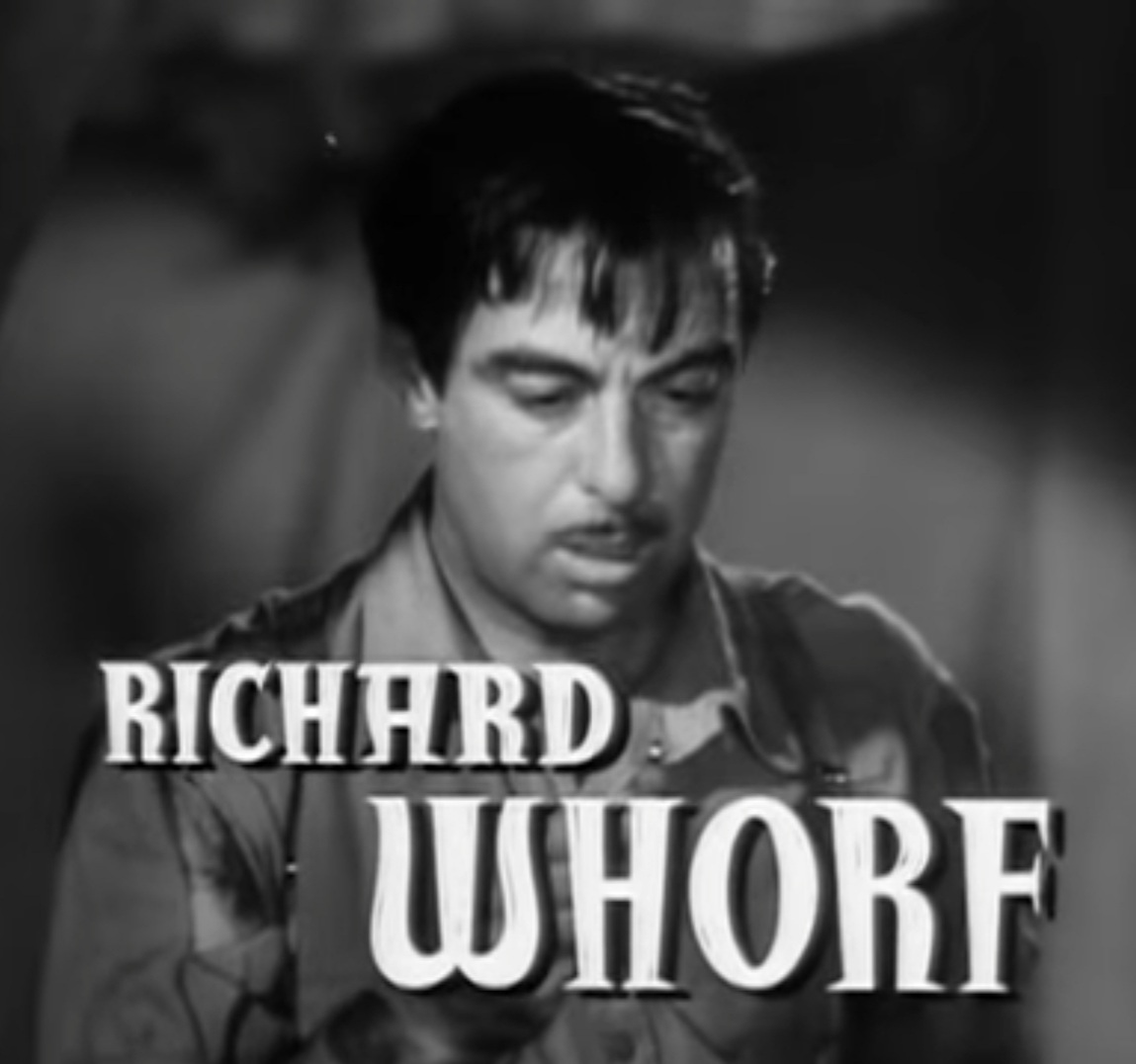
- Trailer for The Cross of Lorraine (1943)
- Born: June 4, 1906; Winthrop, Massachusetts, U.S.
- Died: December 14, 1966 (aged 60); Santa Monica, California, U.S.
- Resting place: Forest Lawn Memorial Park, Hollywood Hills, California
- Occupations: Actor; director; author
- Years active: 1927–1966
- Spouse: Margaret Harriet Smith (m. 1929)
- Relatives: Benjamin Lee Whorf (brother)

Richard Whorf (June 4, 1906 – December 14, 1966) was an American actor, writer and film director.

== Life and acting career ==
Whorf was born in Winthrop, Massachusetts to Harry and Sarah (née Lee) Whorf. His older brother was linguist Benjamin Lee Whorf. Whorf began his acting career on the Boston stage as a teenager, then moved to Broadway at age 21, debuting there in The Banshee (1927). He played a famous painter who had resorted to drinking in the 1960 episode "The Illustrator" of The Rifleman, starring Chuck Connors and Johnny Crawford.

== Directing career ==
He began his film directing career with the 1942 short subject March On, America and the 1944 feature film Blonde Fever.

He directed a number of television programs in the 1950s and 1960s, including early episodes of Gunsmoke, the entire second season of My Three Sons, and 67 episodes of The Beverly Hillbillies. He directed the short-lived series Border Patrol and the 1964–1965 ABC sitcom Mickey, starring Mickey Rooney. In the summer of 1960, he guest-starred in one episode of and directed other segments of the short-lived western series Tate, and he helmed episodes of the 1961–1962 CBS sitcom Father of the Bride, starring Leon Ames.

Whorf directed the unsuccessful 1961 stage comedy Julia, Jake and Uncle Joe.

== Personal life ==
In 1929, Whorf married Margaret H. Smith. He was a brother of Benjamin Lee Whorf (1897–1941), known for being a linguist, and John Whorf (1903–1959), an artist.

== Partial filmography ==
=== As actor ===
- Midnight (1934) – Arthur Weldon
- Blues in the Night (1941) – Jigger Pine
- Yankee Doodle Dandy (1942) – Sam Harris
- Juke Girl (1942) – Danny Frazier
- Keeper of the Flame (1943) – Clive Kerndon
- Assignment in Brittany (1943) – Jean Kerenor
- The Cross of Lorraine (1943) – François
- The Impostor (1944, aka Strange Confession) – Lt. Varenne
- Christmas Holiday (1944) – Simon Fenimore
- Blonde Fever (1944) – Chef (uncredited)
- Chain Lightning (1950) – Carl Troxell
- The Groom Wore Spurs (1951) – Film Director Richard Whorf (uncredited)

=== As director ===
- Blonde Fever (1944)
- The Hidden Eye (1945)
- The Sailor Takes a Wife (1945)
- Till the Clouds Roll By (1946)
- It Happened in Brooklyn (1947)
- Love from a Stranger (1947)
- Luxury Liner (1948)
- Champagne for Caesar (1950)
- The Groom Wore Spurs (1951)
- Gunsmoke (1958)

=== As producer ===
- The Burning Hills (1956)
- Shoot-Out at Medicine Bend (1957)
- Bombers B-52 (1957)
