= Uncertain Glory (1944 film) =

1944 film by Raoul Walsh

- Directed by: Raoul Walsh
- Written by: László Vadnay; Max Brand
- Based on: original story by Joe May and László Vadnay
- Produced by: Robert Buckner
- Starring: Errol Flynn; Paul Lukas
- Cinematography: Sidney Hickox
- Edited by: George Amy
- Music by: Adolph Deutsch
- Production company: Thomson Productions
- Distributed by: Warner Bros. Pictures
- Release dates: April 22, 1944; (US); 1951 (France)
- Running time: 102 minutes
- Country: United States
- Language: English
- Box office: 1,022,524 admissions (France)

Uncertain Glory is a 1944 American World War II crime drama film, directed by Raoul Walsh and starring Errol Flynn and Paul Lukas.

Walsh later called the movie a "quickie". François Truffaut admired the film.

The title is a reference to a line from Shakespeare's play Two Gentlemen of Verona (Act 1, Scene 3): "O, how this spring of love resembleth/ The uncertain glory of an April day,/ Which now shows all the beauty of the sun,/ And by and by a cloud takes all away!"

== Plot ==
In Vichy Paris during World War II, career criminal Jean Picard awaits execution. French Sûreté Inspector Marcel Bonet has pursued Picard for 15 years, finally apprehending him for murder.

An air raid delivers a direct hit to the prison when Picard is at the guillotine. He flees to the apartment of his best friend, Henri Duval, and demands forged papers and 5,000 francs. While Duval is gone, Picard seduces his willing girlfriend Louise. In return, Duval betrays Picard to the Sûreté.

Bonet captures Picard in Bordeaux. Their trip back to Paris is delayed by a bridge, blown up by an unknown saboteur the night before while carrying a German troop train. The Germans round up 100 Frenchmen to be executed in five days unless the perpetrator is found. Thinking he can use his wiles to escape, Picard offers to give himself up instead, since he is already condemned to death. Extremely skeptical, Bonet nonetheless agrees, and prepares Picard so the Germans will be convinced he is the real saboteur.

Picard - now going by the alias Jean Emil Dupont - ducks into a shop, where he is immediately attracted to the woman behind the counter, Marianne. She is a ward of its owner, Mme. Maret, whose son is one of the hostages. Three days remain until the executions. While Jean works Bonet for some time to dally with Marianne, Mme. Maret searches for a fall guy to hand to the Germans in return for her son and the rest of the hostages. Her first pigeon, Brenoir, proves too cowardly.

To clear the path, Bonet notifies his superiors in Paris that he shot Picard when he attempted to escape, with his body lost in a river.

Evidence gathered by the local gendarmes suggests there were three saboteurs. Noting two strangers in town who had not reported to submit their identification papers, its commander leads a detail to Bonet's hotel room, bringing a captured suspect. Thinking fast, "Dupont" reveals Bonet's real identity, giving Bonet a chance to claim both he and the captured man are both with the Sûreté, working undercover to capture the fugitive. Released, the "team" of Bonet and Dupont discover the fugitive to be Major André Varenne of the Free French Army, and aid him in his air evacuation to England.

The next morning Dupont leaves a flu-ridden Bonet behind to rendezvous with Marianne after Sunday mass, planning to use a picnic with her to find an unguarded way out of town.

Meanwhile, the local priest, Father Le Clerc, discovers a second plot by Mme. Maret, this time seeking to get three local men to frame the "innocent" Dupont. He rails that it would be murder.

Bonet's illness worsens, and he is confined to bed. Dupont uses the excuse of wanting to have the priest hear his confession to go out on his own. He meets Marianne, who helps him evade a mob of locals, once again incited by Mme. Maret to turn him in. Again Father Le Clerc quells the uprising.

When Dupont announces he is leaving for Paris, Marianne goes with him, despite his confession that he is an unreliable and disreputable character. By morning they are traveling in a farmer's wagon. The old man and his wife say prayers for their son, one of the hostages. Dupont goes on his own to Paris, telling Marianne he will get money from friends there so they can start a new life together in Martinique.

Back in Paris, Bonet is desperate. He resolves to turn himself in as the saboteur. Then in walks Jean, ready to do so himself, asking only that Bonet retrieve Marianne from her futile vigil. Jean convinces the Nazis he was the sole saboteur. When Bonet goes to Marianne, she asks Bonet, "What is he really like, deep in his heart?" Bonet pauses, then answers, "He was a Frenchman."

== Cast ==
- Errol Flynn as Jean Picard (alias, Jean Emil Dupont)
- Paul Lukas as Inspector Marcel Bonet
- Jean Sullivan as Marianne
- Lucile Watson as Mme. Maret
- Dennis Hoey as Father Le Clerc
- Albert Van Antwerp as Vitrac, an undergrounder
- Wallis Clark as Razeau, an undergrounder
- Victor Kilian as Latour, an undergrounder
- James Flavin as captain, Mobile Guard
- Douglass Dumbrille as Police Commissioner LaFarge
- Art Smith as The Warden
- Faye Emerson as Louise
- Sheldon Leonard as Henri Duval
- Odette Myrtil as Mme. Bonet
- Ivan Triesault as Maj. André Varenne, the saboteur
- Bobby Walberg as Gaston Bonet
- Francis Pierlot as Prison Chaplain
- Pedro de Cordoba as Executioner (bit)
- Fred Cordova as Execution Guard (extra)

== Production ==
In September 1942 it was announced that Flynn had signed a new contract with Warner Bros. Pictures for four films a year, one of which he was to also produce. This was the first film produced under Flynn's new contract with Warners which allowed him a say in the choice of vehicle, director and cast, plus a portion of the profits. He formed his own company, Thomson Productions, to make Uncertain Glory and planned to make a series of films with director Raoul Walsh.

Warners announced the film in June 1943. Flynn was assigned to it instead of Singing in the Wood, where he would have played John James Audubon, the naturalist. That month Robert Buckner was assigned to produce.

Max Brand reportedly worked on the script.

Paul Lukas, who had just had a big hit with Watch on the Rhine, was attached in July 1943. Faye Emerson and Jean Sullivan were signed to support.

=== Shooting ===
Principal photography on Uncertain Glory started in August 1943. During filming it was announced Warners would rush release plans on this and Passage to Marseilles, another drama set in occupied France.

Some filming took place in the grape country in Escondido. While shooting there, labor-strapped farm hands insisted the unit had to pick grapes with them before they would allow filming to take place.

== Reception ==
A contemporary The Washington Post reviewer wrote "Flynn has never given a more restrained, earnest and believable portrayal ... there is guile, sly humour, an appealing bravado, grim rebellion, gentleness, charm, in his drawing of a character that is alternately enigmatic and transparent. Mr Flynn is more of an actor than many have thought."

In 2019 Filmink magazine said "The story gets off to a terrific start" but that "about a third of the way in, it all goes haywire."

== Selected clip ==
Jean Picard (Errol Flynn), Inspector Marcel Bonet (Paul Lukas)

Clip: Jean Picard (Errol Flynn), Inspector Marcel Bonet (Paul Lukas)
Inspector Marcel Bonet:	Well, it's been a long road, Jean. Hasn't it?
Jean Picard:	Yes, but you see, it's come to the right ending.
