= Odette Myrtil =

French-American actress, singer, and violinist (1898–1978)

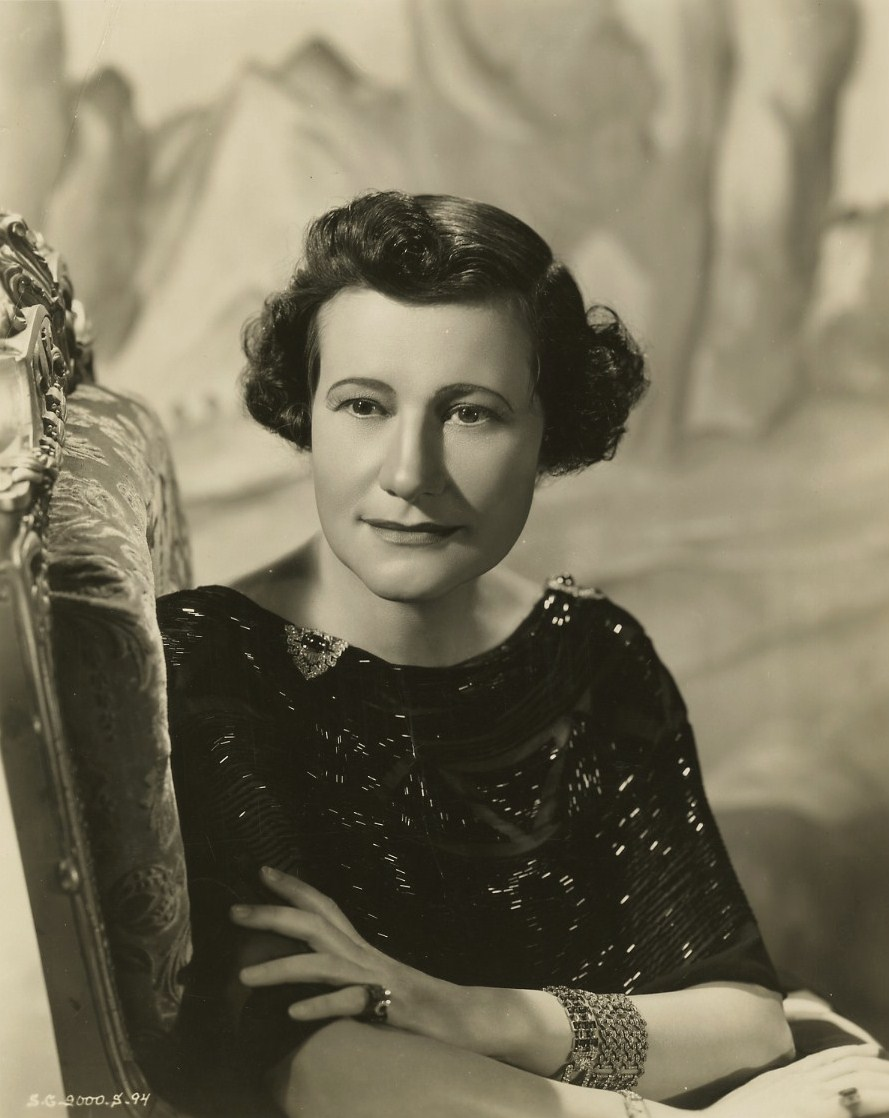
- Myrtil in The Firefly (1943)
- Born: Odette Laure Clotilde Quignarde; June 28, 1898; Paris, French Third Republic
- Died: November 18, 1978 (aged 80); Doylestown, Pennsylvania, U.S.
- Resting place: Buckingham Friends Cemetery
- Occupations: Actress; singer; violinist
- Years active: 1923–1971
- Spouse(s): Bob Adams (m. 1917; div. 1928) Stanley Logan (m. 19??; died 1953)
- Children: 1

Odette Myrtil (born Odette Laure Clotilde Quignarde; June 28, 1898 – November 18, 1978) was a French-born American actress, singer, and violinist. She began her career as a violinist on the vaudeville stage in Paris at 14. She expanded into acting and singing and had her first major success at 18 on the London stage in the 1916 musical revue The Bing Boys Are Here. She was a staple in Broadway productions from 1924 to 1932, after which she returned only periodically to Broadway through 1960. She also appeared on the stages of Chicago, London, Los Angeles, and Paris several times during her career.

From 1923 to 1972, Myrtil appeared as an actress in a total of 28 feature films, most of which were made from the mid-1930s through the mid-1950s. Not a leading lady on camera, she specialized in character roles and was often used for her gifts as a singer. She made only one television appearance during her career: in the Studio One in Hollywood 1953 episode "The Paris Feeling". She worked as a costume designer for nine motion pictures from 1944 to 1950.

== Life and career ==
Odette Myrtil was born Odette Laure Clotilde Quignarde, although some sources cite Belza as her surname at birth, in Paris, the daughter of two stage actors. She studied the violin at a boarding school in Brussels and began performing the violin professionally at the age of 13.

In 1915, aged 16, she came to the United States to join the Ziegfeld Follies on Broadway as one of the Ziegfeld Girls.

The following year she came to London, where she was a major success in the West End show The Bing Boys Are Here. She spent the next several years appearing successfully on the London stage and in vaudeville productions in major European cities.

In 1923, she returned to New York City as a vaudeville entertainer at the Palace Theatre, where she had her first major success in America. She became a staple of the theatre scene in New York City into the early 1930s, often appearing in Broadway musicals that featured her singing and violinist abilities. She had a particular triumph as Odette in Jerome Kern's 1931 musical The Cat and the Fiddle, which was written specifically as a vehicle for her. after that, she only made a handful of appearances on Broadway, with her last show being the original production of Harold Arlen and Johnny Mercer's Saratoga in 1960.

She spent several years in the early 1950s portraying Bloody Mary in the original run of Rodgers and Hammerstein's South Pacific, having succeeded Juanita Hall in the role.

After 1935, her career shifted towards film, although she never left her stage roots. She had a fairly prolific career as a film actress, appearing in mainly mid-sized roles in 25 films from 1936 to 1952. Previously, she only appeared as a dancer in the 1923 film Squibs M.P. Her first speaking role was as Renée De Penable in Dodsworth (1936).

Some of her other film credits are Kitty Foyle (1940), Out of the Fog (1941), I Married an Angel (1942), Yankee Doodle Dandy (1942), The Palm Beach Story (1942), Uncertain Glory (1944), Devotion (1946), The Fighting Kentuckian (1949), and as Madame Darville in Alfred Hitchcock's Strangers on a Train (1951). She sang the title song on camera as herself in the 1954 film The Last Time I Saw Paris (1954) and again portrayed herself in her last film appearance in the film Hot Pants Holiday (1972).

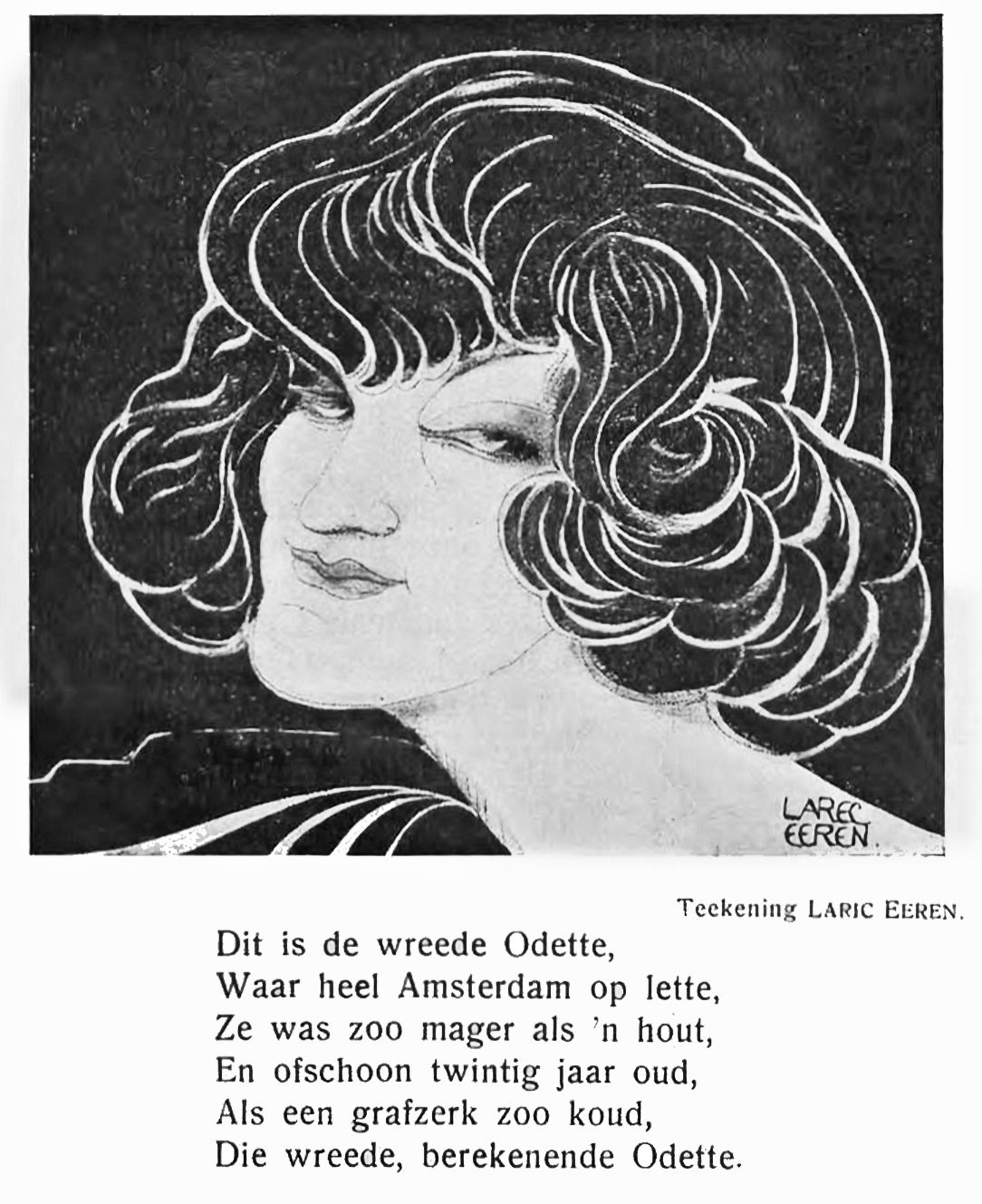
Caricature of Myrtil by the Dutch cartoonist Larec Eeren, 1915

== Post-acting career ==
Myrtil resided in New Hope, Pennsylvania during most of her later life. From 1955 to 1958 she managed The Playhouse Inn, located next door to the Bucks County Playhouse. From 1961 to 1976 she operated the New Hope restaurant Chez Odette, which later became Odette's Restaurant, a different restaurant under newer ownership.

During her life, Myrtil was married twice: for eight years to vaudeville performer Robert Adams and later to film director and producer Stanley Logan. She died in nearby Doylestown, Pennsylvania in 1978, aged 80.

== Filmography ==
Year	Title	Role	Notes
1923	Squibs M.P.	Dancer	
1936	Dodsworth	Renée de Penable	
1937	The Girl from Scotland Yard	Mme. Yvonne Dupre	
1938	The Toy Wife	Landlady	Uncredited
1938	Suez	Duchess	
1940	Kitty Foyle	Delphine Detaille	
1941	Out of the Fog	Caroline Pomponette	
1941	Two-Faced Woman	Dress Shop Saleswoman	Uncredited
1942	Yankee Doodle Dandy	Madame Bartholdi	
1942	The Pied Piper	Madame Rougeron	
1942	I Married an Angel	The Modiste	Uncredited
1942	The Palm Beach Story	Sales Clerk	Uncredited
1942	Reunion in France	Mme. Montanot	
1943	Forever and a Day	Madame Gaby	
1943	Assignment in Brittany	Louis' Sister	
1943	Thousands Cheer	Mama Corbino	Uncredited
1943	My Kingdom for a Cook	Madame Touchet	Uncredited
1944	Uncertain Glory	Mme. Bonet	
1944	Dark Waters	Mama Boudreaux	
1945	The Great John L.	Frenchwoman	Uncredited
1945	Rhapsody in Blue	Madame DeBreteuil	Uncredited
1946	Devotion	Mme. Heger	Uncredited
1949	The Fighting Kentuckian	Madame De Marchand	
1951	Strangers on a Train	Madame Darville	Uncredited
1951	Here Comes the Groom	Gray Lady	Uncredited
1952	Lady Possessed	Mrs. Burrows	
1954	The Last Time I Saw Paris	Singer	
1972	Hot Pants Holiday	Odette	(final film role)
