= Blonde Fever =

1944 film by Richard Whorf

- Theatrical release poster
- Directed by: Richard Whorf
- Screenplay by: Patricia Coleman
- Based on: Delila, 1937 play by Ferenc Molnár
- Produced by: William H. Wright
- Starring: Philip Dorn; Mary Astor; Felix Bressart; Gloria Grahame
- Cinematography: Lester White
- Edited by: George Hively
- Music by: Nathaniel Shilkret
- Distributed by: MGM
- Release date: December 5, 1944
- Running time: 69 minutes
- Country: United States
- Language: English

Blonde Fever is a 1944 American comedy film starring Philip Dorn, Mary Astor, and Felix Bressart, and introducing stage actress Gloria Grahame. It was Richard Whorf’s directorial debut.

== Plot ==
Peter Donay and his long suffering wife Delilah own the Café Donay, an upscale Continental eatery on the main road between Reno and Lake Tahoe.

He is in hot pursuit of leggy dining room attendant Sally Murfin, who is more interested in his money and business than anything else. Delilah learns about her husband's obsession and tries to wait it out, hoping Sally marries fiancée Freddie Bilson before things go too far.

Freddie doesn’t make enough money to wed working at a gas station, so Delilah gets him a job at the restaurant and a place to live for free above their garage. She’s also hoping having him there will drive a wedge between her husband and the saucy Sally.

Freddie buys extra lottery tickets hoping he will luck out. Instead, Peter wins the $40,000. Sally sees an easy path to furs, jewels, and the high life in New York City. Peter falls easily into her trap.

Ultimately, there is a confrontation between the three. Peter comes away with Sally. Delilah says she’ll make it easy for Peter by divorcing him in Nevada within the week. But to remove the temptation of Sally only being interested in him for his money, requests Peter’s still unendorsed lottery winnings check in lieu of alimony. Peter agrees and signs it over.

Spending a sleepless night, he comes to realize his mistake in mistreating Delilah and wants to earn his wife back. Delilah instead lays on an elaborate ruse, making a big show of departing for Reno for her divorce the next morning. When Sally appears for work, Delilah invites her to have breakfast. Sally expresses her relief and admiration at Delilah’s graciousness. In return, Delilah shares how happy she will be to see that Sally gets the man she covets, now unencumbered by a complicating fortune. Sally can love him solely for the man he is.

Sally is outraged to hear Peter has been stripped of his dazzling riches, and is easy prey for Freddie when he rolls up in a fancy outfit aboard a brand new motorcycle - the proceeds of Delilah having signed over Peter’s check to him.

Sally now pledges her loyalty to Freddie and disappears with him, while Peter begs Delilah for forgiveness, proclaiming his undying love and assuring her how much he’s been wisened both by his own foolishness and her understanding. Ultimately Delilah gives in and takes him back.

Good fortune then smiles when Delilah‘s trusty ally, the restaurant bartender, confesses he failed to carry out her wishes of turning over the entire lottery winnings to Freddie, and instead simply bought him off with the new motorcycle and a mere thousand dollars. He then hands over the barely dented balance of the $40,000.

He then retrieves Delilah‘s trunk from the waiting taxi and wheels it into the lobby, where it falls open and reveals itself empty, and proof of Delilah‘s successful bluff.

== Cast ==
- Philip Dorn as Peter Donay
- Mary Astor as Delilah Donay
- Felix Bressart as Johnny
- Gloria Grahame as Sally Murfin
- Marshall Thompson as Freddie Bilson
- Curt Bois as Brillon
- Elisabeth Risdon as Mrs. Talford
- Arthur Walsh as Willie

== Production ==
The film had Autumn Fever for working title. The film was Gloria Grahame's screen debut.
