= Jean Sullivan =

American actress

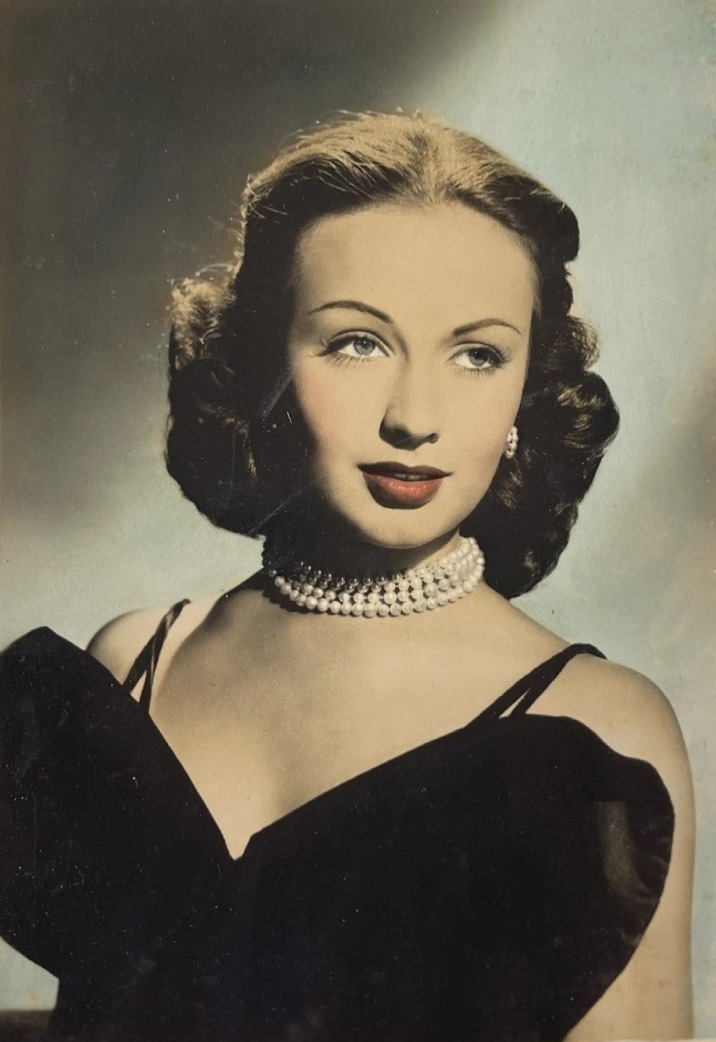
- Sullivan in 1945
- Born: May 26, 1923; Logan, Utah, U.S.
- Died: February 27, 2003 (aged 79); Woodland Hills, California, U.S.
- Occupation: Actress
- Years active: 1952–1972
- Spouse: Tom Poston (m. 1955; div. 1961)
- Children: 1

Jean Sullivan (May 26, 1923 – February 27, 2003) was an American actress and dancer. She acted in film, television and stage productions, and danced both flamenco and ballet, the latter with the American Ballet Theatre.

== Biography ==
Sullivan was born on May 26, 1923, in Logan, Utah, the daughter of Army Colonel Alexander Sullivan and Claire Cardon Sullivan. She had two younger sisters and a younger brother. As she grew up, she lived in Fort Sam Houston, Texas; Columbus, Ohio; and upstate New York before she reached Hollywood. She went to UCLA to study English literature major but changed her major to drama.

She was discovered by a scout from Warner Brothers, who saw her acting in the play Our Town at UCLA, and was signed immediately. (In 1943, Sullivan said that the scout urged her to sign but, "I told him I'd never thought of motion pictures and definitely wasn't ready for that sort of thing anyway. But he kept coming back. After six months I finally said yes.") Before she signed, she had planned to seek a career in modern ballet.

Sullivan moved to New York and turned her focus to ballet, both studying it and performing as a professional dancer, eventually joining the American Ballet Theatre.

She was co-artistic director with Michael Fischetti of the South Street Theatre Company, and played Spanish guitar, cello, and piano.

Sullivan died of cardiac arrest in Woodland Hills, California at the age of 79. She had a daughter, the actress Francesca Poston, by actor Tom Poston, whom she married in 1955. She and Poston separated in 1959 and divorced two years later.

== Filmography ==
=== Features ===
- Uncertain Glory (1944)
- Escape in the Desert (1945)
- Roughly Speaking (1945)
- Squirm (1976)

=== Television ===
- One Day at a Time
- Somerset
- The Doctors
- Search for Tomorrow
- NBC Family Hour
- Colgate Family Hour
- Lamp Unto Thy Feet

== Theatre roles ==
- The Seagull – Arkadina – Sybil Burton's New Theatre
- Macbeth – Lady Macbeth – Royal Shakespeare Company at JASTA
- Much Ado About Nothing – Hero – Royal Shakespeare Company for the Theatre Guild
- Phedre – Phedre – La Comedie Francaise (replaced Beatrice Straight) – Off-Broadway and touring
- Luv – Ruth
- The Bald Soprano – Mrs. Smith
- The Dark Lady of the Sonnets – Queen Elizabeth I
- Spoon River Anthology
- The Stronger – South Street Theatre (NYC)
- Before Breakfast – Vienna English Theatre (Vienna, Austria)

== Awards ==
Sullivan was selected as an Honored Member in the "US Executives" Category for 1989's "Who's Who in America".
