= Rubber (1936 film) =

- Directed by: Johan De Meester, Gerard Rutten
- Written by: Johan De Meester, Gerard Rutten
- Music by: Walter Gronostay
- Release date: 3 September 1936
- Running time: 106 minutes
- Country: Netherlands
- Language: Dutch

Rubber is a 1936 Dutch film directed by Johan De Meester and Gerard Rutten. It tells the story of Dutch newlyweds trying to adjust to a difficult life on a Sumatran plantation. A large portion of the film is believed to be lost; a 63-minute fragment remains in the archives of the Dutch Film Museum.

== Cast ==
In alphabetical order

- Johan De Meester
- Leo de Hartogh
- Philip Dorn ... John van Laer (as Frits van Dongen)
- Matthieu van Eysden
- Ben Groenier
- Jan Hahn
- Constant van Kerckhoven Jr.
- Folkert Kramer
- Philippe La Chapelle
- Enny Meunier
- Amsy Moina
- Dolly Mollinger ... Anette
- Johan Schilthuyzen
- Georges Spanelly ... Ravinsky
- Hendrik Van Ees
- Daan Van Olleffen (as Daan van Offelen jr.)
- Tony Van Otterloo ... Joop
- Elias van Praag
- Mien Duymaer Van Twist
- Jules Verstraete ... Meesters
- A. Wilmink ... Popole
