= Battle Flame =

1959 film

- Theatrical release poster
- Directed by: R. G. Springsteen
- Screenplay by: Elwood Ullman
- Story by: Lester A. Sansom; Elwood Ullman
- Produced by: Lester A. Sansom
- Starring: Scott Brady; Elaine Edwards; Robert Blake; Wayne Heffley; Gordon Jones; Ken Miller
- Cinematography: Carl E. Guthrie
- Edited by: William Austin
- Music by: Marlin Skiles
- Production company: Allied Artists Pictures
- Distributed by: Allied Artists Pictures
- Release date: July 26, 1959
- Running time: 78 minutes
- Country: United States
- Language: English

Battle Flame is a 1959 American war film directed by R. G. Springsteen and written by Elwood Ullman. The film stars Scott Brady, Elaine Edwards, Robert Blake, Wayne Heffley, Gordon Jones and Ken Miller. The film was released on July 26, 1959, by Allied Artists Pictures.

== Cast ==
- Scott Brady as 1st Lt. Frank Davis
- Elaine Edwards as Lt. Mary Ferguson
- Robert Blake as Cpl. Jake Pacheco
- Wayne Heffley as Teach
- Gordon Jones as Sgt. McKelvey
- Ken Miller as Orlando
- Arthur Walsh as Nawlins
- Richard Harrison as 2nd Lt. Wechsler
- Gary Kent as Gilcrist
- Peggy Moffitt as Nurse Fisher
- Jean Robbins as Nurse Claycomb
- Richard Crane as Dr. Bill Stoddard
- Robert Shayne as Lt. Norris
- Guy Prescott as Lt. Col. Struthers
- Robert Christopher as Capt. Herndon
- John Mitchum as Maj. Dowling

== Reception ==
Variety wrote the film "sputters through wartime cliches as if lonely marines and lousy rations were fresh enough to arouse an audience’s untouched sympathies. They’re not and, while the Allied Artists production gains zest midway through its 78 minutes, a rambling start makes it just another programmer."
