= Tom Poston =

American actor (1921–2007)

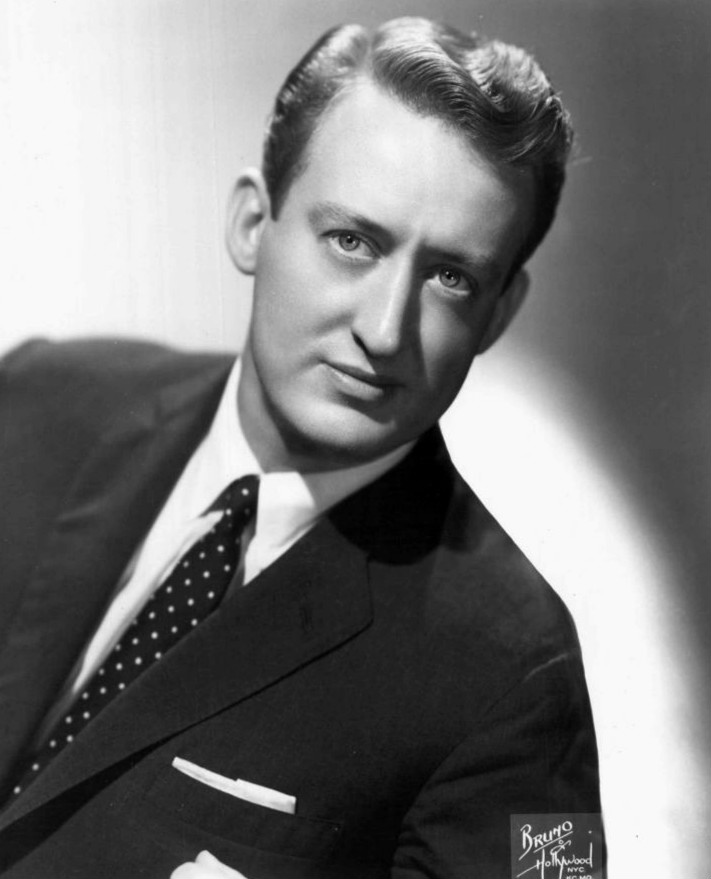
- Born: Thomas Gordon Poston; October 17, 1921; Columbus, Ohio, U.S.
- Died: April 30, 2007 (aged 85); Los Angeles, California, U.S.
- Resting place: Hillside Memorial Park Cemetery
- Education: American Academy of Dramatic Arts
- Occupation: Actor
- Years active: 1950–2007
- Known for: George Utley on Newhart; Franklin Bickley on Mork & Mindy
- Spouses: Karen Lindgren (m. 1949; div. 1955) Jean Sullivan (m. 1955; div. 1961) Kay Hudson (m. 1968; div. 1976) (m. 1980; died 1998) Suzanne Pleshette (m. 2001)
- Children: 3
- Military career
- Allegiance: United States
- Branch: United States Army: Army Air Forces
- Service years: 1941-1945
- Rank: Captain
- Conflicts: World War II: Battle of Normandy

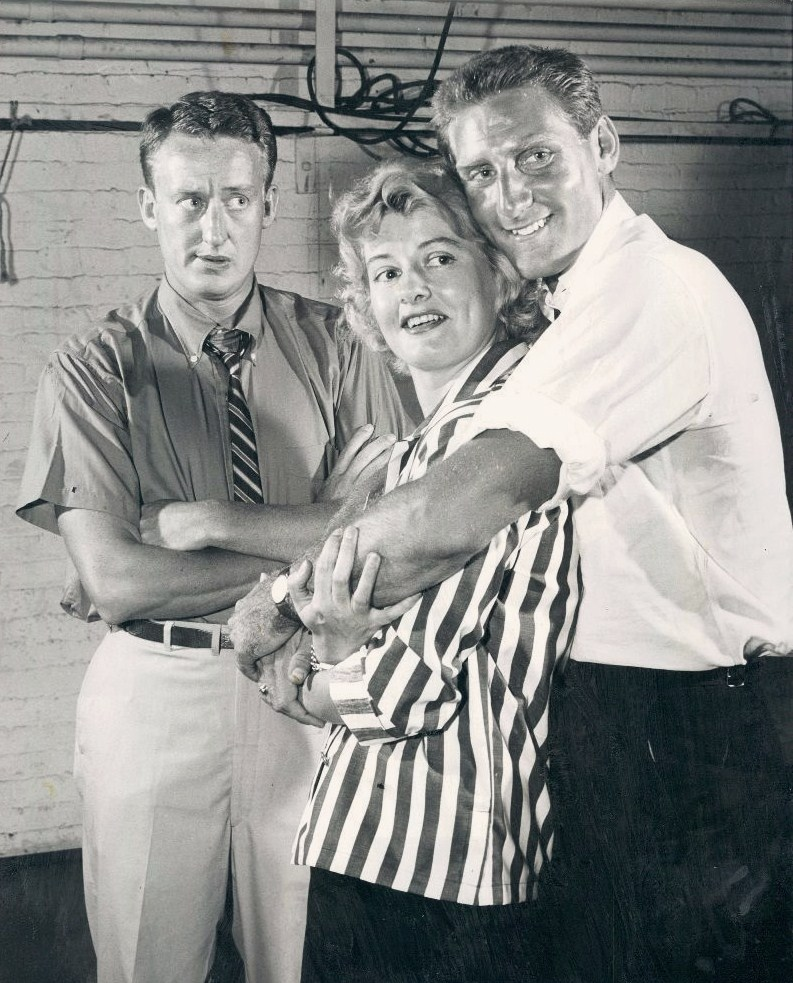
Tom Poston (left), Constance Ford, and Robert Elston in the Broadway production of Golden Fleecing (1959), written by Lorenzo Semple Jr.

Thomas Gordon Poston (October 17, 1921 – April 30, 2007) was an American actor, appearing in television roles from the 1950s through the early to mid-2000s, reportedly appearing in more sitcoms than any other actor. In the 1980s, he played George Utley on the CBS sitcom Newhart, receiving three Emmy Award nominations for the role. In addition he had a number of film roles and appeared frequently on Broadway and television game shows.

== Early life ==
Poston was born on October 17, 1921 in Columbus, Ohio, to George and Margaret Poston. His father was a liquor salesman and dairy chemist.

After completing high school, Poston attended Bethany College in West Virginia, but did not graduate. While there, he joined the Sigma Nu fraternity. He joined the United States Army Air Forces in 1941. Accepted to officer candidate school and then graduating from flight training, Poston served as a pilot in the European Theater in World War II; his aircraft dropped paratroopers for the Normandy invasion.

Poston served in North Africa, Italy, France, and England. After his discharge, he began studying acting in New York City, graduating from the American Academy of Dramatic Arts.

== Career ==
In 1953, as Thomas Poston, he was cast as "Detective" in the film City That Never Sleeps. In 1957, Poston gained recognition as a comedic "Man in the Street" (along with his colleagues Louis Nye, Dayton Allen and Don Knotts) on The Steve Allen Show. For these performances, Poston won the 1959 Emmy Award for Best Supporting Actor (Continuing Character) in a Comedy Series. In the fall of 1959, when the Allen program moved west to Los Angeles, Poston remained in New York, appearing frequently on Broadway and television game shows.

His film career was limited, with appearances in films such as William Castle's Zotz! (1962), The Old Dark House (1963), Soldier in the Rain (1963), Cold Turkey (1971), The Happy Hooker (1975), Rabbit Test (1978), Up the Academy (1980) and Carbon Copy (1981). He was cast as Michael Carrington's uncle Tom Anderson in Grease 2 (1982), but his scenes were deleted.

His television career covered the better part of five decades. When Mel Brooks submitted his idea for Get Smart to the ABC network, ABC wanted Poston for the lead role of Maxwell Smart. When ABC passed on the show, NBC picked it up and the lead went to Don Adams. Poston, however, made a guest appearance on the show as a KAOS villain. He appeared in Thriller during its second season in 1961. The episode, number six, was titled "Masquerade" and starred Elizabeth Montgomery.

In 1968, Poston played the role of the Scarecrow, at The Municipal Opera Association of St. Louis, production of The Wizard of Oz. Lana Cantrell played Dorothy Gale, and Betty Low played the Sorceress of the North, also known as Glinda.

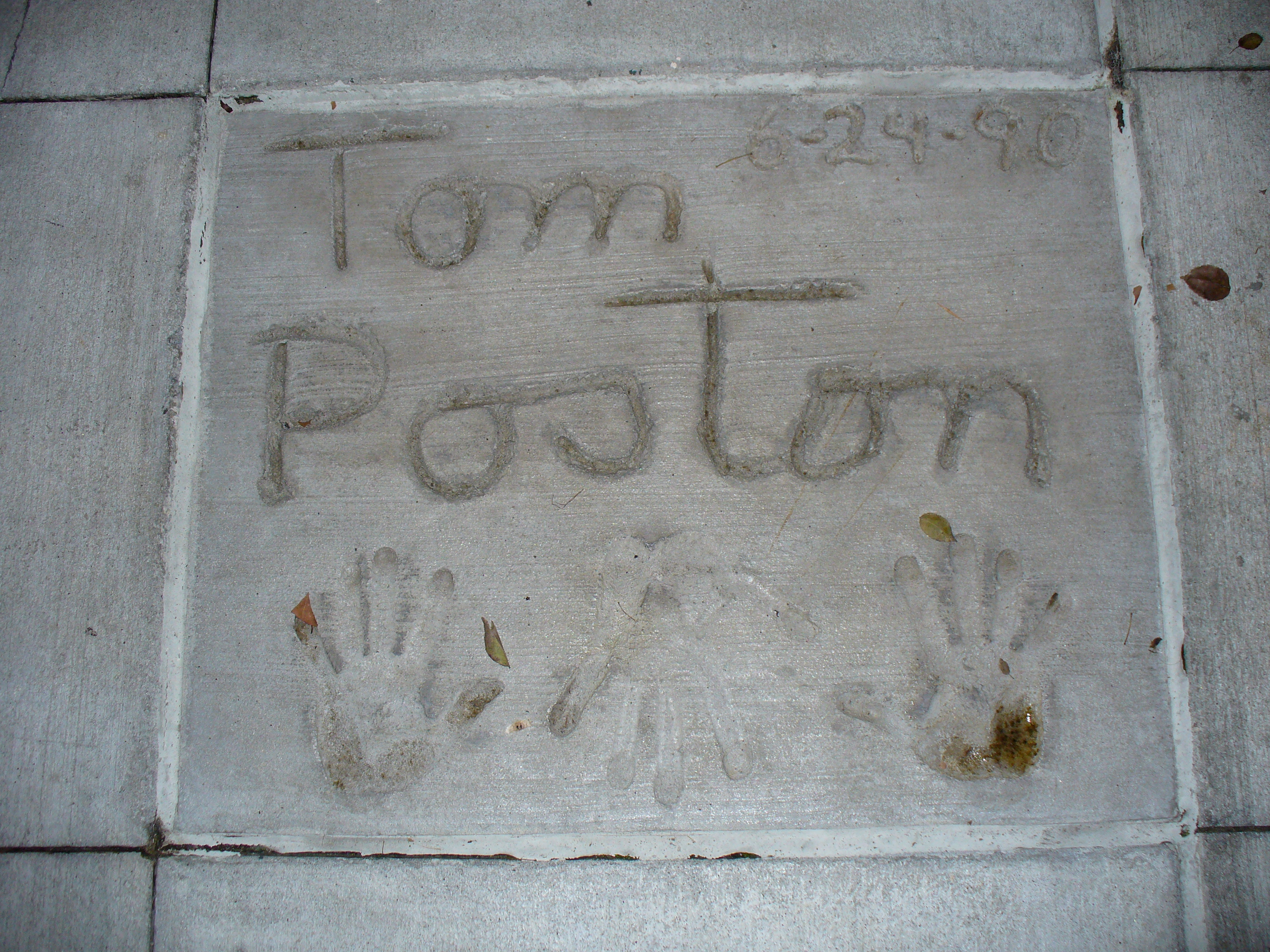
The handprints of Tom Poston in front of Hollywood Hills Amphitheater at Walt Disney World's Disney's Hollywood Studios theme park.

Poston was a recurring guest star on The Bob Newhart Show in the 1970s, playing "The Peeper", a buddy of Bob's since college, whereby he and Bob would try to one-up each other with practical jokes. Poston later played the role of Franklin Delano Bickley on Mork & Mindy.

A longtime friend of Bob Newhart, Poston also played George Utley, a simple country handyman of the Stratford Inn, on Newhart, and appeared with Newhart in Cold Turkey as the town drunk, Edgar Stopworth. He was nominated for an Emmy Award three times for Outstanding Supporting Actor in a Comedy Series for his performance on Newhart in 1984, 1986, and 1987. He had a third role with Newhart in the short-lived sitcom Bob.

Poston had roles on many other television series: Family Matters, Murphy Brown, Touched by an Angel, Cosby, Malcolm & Eddie, ER, Grace Under Fire, That '70s Show (as Kitty Forman's father, Burt Sigurdson), Will & Grace, and guest starred in an episode of The Simpsons as the Capital City Goofball. He played dentist/jeweler, Art Hibke, on ABC's Coach, for which he was nominated for an Emmy for Outstanding Guest Actor in a Comedy Series in 1991. He guest-starred in three episodes of Home Improvement as a surly airport clerk in Alpena, Michigan when Tim and Al get stuck there during a snowstorm on Christmas Eve in the episode "Twas the Flight Before Christmas", again as that character's brother in the episode "The Tool Man Delivers", and again as the third brother in the episode "Thanksgiving".

In 2001, he appeared on The Lone Gunmen episode "The Cap'n Toby Show" and in King of the Hill episode "Now Who's The Dummy?" as Mr. Popper (voice). In 2005, he played the character "Clown" on the brief-lived NBC series Committed and guest-starred on the ABC series 8 Simple Rules as Rory's unlawful friend Jake in the episode "Good Moms Gone Wild". In 2006, Poston guest-starred on an episode of The Suite Life of Zack & Cody, entitled "Ah! Wilderness" as Merle, which was his final role.

== Personal life and death ==
Poston married his frequent summer theater co-star, Karen Lindgren, also known as Doris Sward, in October 1949. They divorced amicably in 1955.

He married Jean Sullivan in 1955. They had a daughter, Francesca (born 1956). Poston and Sullivan announced their separation in 1959 and divorced two years later.

Poston began dating Kay Hudson in the spring of 1961, when she was 17 and he was 39. The couple married in 1968. They had two children, son Jason (born 1969) and daughter Hudson (born 1972). They divorced in 1976 but remarried in 1980 and remained together until her death at age 54 in 1998 from ALS.

In 2001, Poston married actress Suzanne Pleshette, who played the wife of Newhart's character Bob Hartley on The Bob Newhart Show. It was his fourth marriage and her third. Pleshette and Poston had dated briefly in 1959 and got back together in 2000.

Following a brief illness, Poston died of respiratory failure on April 30, 2007, in Los Angeles, California, at the age of 85. He pre-deceased Pleshette by nine months. Although he was not Jewish, he is interred in the Jewish Hillside Memorial Park Cemetery alongside Pleshette, who was Jewish.

== Filmography ==
=== Films ===
Year	Title	Role	Notes
1952	Skirts Ahoy!	Walk-on	Uncredited
1953	City That Never Sleeps	Detective	Credited as Thomas Poston
1962	Zotz!	Professor Jonathan Jones	
1963	The Old Dark House	Tom Penderel	
1963	Soldier in the Rain	Lieutenant Magee	
1971	Cold Turkey	Mr. Stopworth	
1975	The Happy Hooker	J. Arthur Conrad	
1978	Rabbit Test	Minister	
1980	Up the Academy	Sisson	
1981	Carbon Copy	Reverend Hayworth	
1989	Murphy's Laws of Golf	George	Short film
1998	Krippendorf's Tribe	Gordon Hargrove	
1999	The Story of Us	Harry	
2003	Beethoven's 5th	John Giles / Selig	
2004	The Princess Diaries 2: Royal Engagement	Lord Palimore	
2004	Christmas with the Kranks	Father Zabriskie	Final film role

=== Television ===
Year	Title	Role	Notes
1950	Tom Corbett, Space Cadet	The Alkarian	Episode: "The Mystery of Alkar"
1950–1951	Lights Out	Sir John	2 episodes
1951	Studio One in Hollywood	Sentry / Alec Gordon	2 episodes
1953	Kukla, Fran and Ollie	Himself	Episode: "Ollie produces 'E Grilch Ge Dunk Dunk'"
1953	Hawkins Falls: A Television Novel	Toby Winfield	Unknown episodes
1955	Goodyear Playhouse	Currently Unknown	Episode: "Tangled Web"
1956	Playwrights '56	Fletcher	Episode: "You Sometimes Get Rich"
1956	Robert Montgomery Presents	Currently Unknown	Episode: "Who?"
1956–1957	The Phil Silvers Show	Guard House Lieutenant / The Lieutenant	2 episodes
1956–1960	The Steve Allen Plymouth Show	Comedian / Guest / Himself	44 episodes
1957	The United States Steel Hour	Chester	Episode: "The Change in Chester"
1957	The Steve Allen Show	Comedian	Episode: "#3.11"
1958	The Christmas Tree	Tom	Television film
1958–1966	What's My Line?	Himself / Mystery Guest / Panelist	10 episodes
1959	The Ed Sullivan Show	Lieutenant Ferguson Howard	Episode: "#13.9"
1959–1960	Split Personality (Game Show)	Himself / Host	Studio: NBC Studio 8H, New York City, NY
1959–1967	To Tell the Truth	Himself / Panelist	317 episodes
1960	The Tempest	Trinculo	Television film
1960	Play of the Week	Supervisor	Episode: "The Enchanted"
1961	Thriller	Charlie Denham	Episode: "Masquerade"
1963–1964	Match Game	Himself / Team Captain	35 episodes
1963–1964	Missing Links	Himself / Panelist	27 episodes
1964	The Defenders	Sheldon Lowell	2 episodes
1965	Bob Hope Presents the Chrysler Theatre	Janitor / Lieutenant Courtney	Episode: "Double Jeopardy"
1968	Gentle Ben	Joe Cardigan	Episode: "Trophy Bear"
1969	The Good Guys	Julian Brent	Episode: "The World's Second Greatest Lover"
1969	Get Smart	Doctor Zharko	Episode: "Shock It to Me"
1974	Bobby Parker & Company	His Psychiatrist	Unsold CBS TV pilot
1975	Harry and Maggie	Arlo Wilson	Television Short
1975–1976	On the Rocks	Mister Sullivan	13 episodes
1975–1977	The Bob Newhart Show	Cliff Murdock	5 episodes
1976	Alice	Jerry Dittmeyer	Episode: "Vera's Mortician"
1976–1977	Match Game	Himself / Panelist	10 episodes
1977	All's Fair	Harold Banks	Episode: "Save the Yak"
1977	The Magnificent Magical Magnet of Santa Mesa	William Bensinger	Television film
1977–1978	We've Got Each Other	Damon Jerome	13 episodes
1977–1987	The Love Boat	Tom Poston / Daniel Baker / Mickey O'Day	3 episodes
1978	A Guide to the Married Woman	Marty Gibson	Television Film
1978	Flying High	Zarky	Episode: "The Vanishing Point"
1978	Fame	Car Salesman	Television Film
1979	$weepstake$	Leeds	Episode: "Dewey and Harold and Sarah and Maggie"
1979	CHiPs	Bill Conner	Episode: "Quarantine"
1979	Beane's of Boston	Mister Frank Beane	Pilot Episode
1979–1980	The Hollywood Squares (Daytime)	Center Square / Himself / Panelist	21 episodes
1979–1981	Mork & Mindy	Franklin Bickley	54 episodes
1980	Good Time Harry	Ben Younger	Episode: "Ben Younger"
1981	The Girl, the Gold Watch & Dynamite	Omar Krepps	Television film
1981–1982	Password Plus	Celebrity Contestant / Himself	11 episodes
1982	King's Crossing	Brian Gunshore	Episode: "The Home Front"
1982	I've Had It Up to Here	Currently Unknown	Television film
1982–1990	Newhart	George Utley	184 episodes
1983–1984	Match Game-Hollywood Squares Hour	Himself / Panelist	24 episodes
1984–1985	Body Language	Himself	15 episodes
1984–1989	Super Password	Celebrity Contestant / Himself	70 episodes
1985	Hotel	Tommy Rooney	Episode: "Pathways"
1986	Crazy Like a Fox	Currently Unknown	Episode: "A Fox at the Races"
1986	Fresno	Doctor Parseghian	Miniseries 4 episodes
1987	D.C. Follies	Tom Poston	Episode: "Pilot"
1988	Save the Dog!	Currently Unknown	Television film
1988	St. Elsewhere	Jim Morrison	Episode: "The Abby Singer Show"
1990	A Quiet Little Neighborhood, a Perfect Little Murder	Don Corman	Television film
1990	The Simpsons	Capital City Goofball	Voice; Episode: "Dancin' Homer"
1990–1991	Good Grief	Ringo Prowley	13 episodes
1990–1995	Coach	Dr. Art Hibke / Art Hibke	4 episodes
1991	Harry and the Hendersons	Currently Unknown	Episode: "Harry and the Homeless Man"
1992–1993	Bob	Jerry Fleisher	4 episodes
1993	Dream On	Sidney 'Uncle Bouncy' Barish	Episode: "Oral Sex, Lies and Videotape"
1993	Dr. Quinn, Medicine Woman	Mysterious 'Dead Man'	Episode: "Halloween"
1994	Big Daddy's Barbecue	Virgil	Television Film
1994–1995	Family Matters	Mr. Looney	3 episodes
1994–1996	Murphy Brown	Old Man Swenson	2 episodes
1995	Aaahh!!! Real Monsters	Ralph / Burly Man	Voices; Episode: "Eau de Krumm/O'Lucky Monster"
1995–1997	Home Improvement	Ted / Ned / Fred (The No-Servicemen)	3 episodes
1995–1998	Grace Under Fire	Floyd Norton	32 episodes
1996	The Larry Sanders Show	Tom Poston	Episode: "My Name Is Asher Kingsley"
1997	George and Leo	Traffic Cop	Episode: "The Pilot Episode"
1997	Sabrina the Teenage Witch	Mortgage Banker	Episode: "Witch Trash"
1998	Just Shoot Me!	Herb	Episode: "Jack's Old Partner"
1998	Touched by an Angel	Ed Yablonsky	Episode: "Cry and You Cry Alone"
1998	Suddenly Susan	Mr. Vance	Episode: "Sleeping with the Enemy"
1998	Maggie Winters	Lester Mulford	Episode: "Mama's Got a Brand New Bag"
1998	Rugrats	Roy	Voice; Episode: "Baking Dil/Hair!"
1998	Contempt of Court	Coroner	Television Film
1999	Cosby	Tim	2 episodes
1999	Honey, I Shrunk the Kids: The TV Show	Uncle Cosmo	Episode: "Honey, It's the Ghostest with the Mostest"
1999	Diagnosis: Murder	Tom Porter	Episode: "The Roast"
1999–2000	Malcolm & Eddie	Garth Dubin	2 episodes
2000	Dharma & Greg	Dr. Gillespie	Episode: "The Spy Who Said He Loved Me"
2000	Normal, Ohio	Stanley	Episode: "Just Another Normal Christmas"
2001	The Drew Carey Show	Roscoe Harvey	Episode: "Oswald's Dad Returns"
2001	King of the Hill	Mr. Popper	Voice; Episode: "Now Who's the Dummy?"
2001	ER	Earl	2 episodes
2001	The Lone Gunmen	Captain Toby / Fred Tabalowski	Episode: "The 'Cap'n Toby' Show"
2001	The Ellen Show	Joe	Episode: "Joe"
2002	Apple Valley Knights	Justice Knight Sr.	Unknown episodes
2002	Becker	Joe Willakie	Episode: "Talking Points"
2002	Will & Grace	Norman	Episode: "Went to a Garden Potty"
2002	Liberty's Kids: Est. 1776	Samuel Adams	Voice; 5 episodes
2002–2003	That '70s Show	Burt Sigurdson	3 episodes
2003	Good Morning, Miami	Lenny	2 episodes
2003	8 Simple Rules	Jake	Episode: "Good Moms Gone Wild"
2005	Committed	Clown	13 episodes
2006	The Suite Life of Zack & Cody	Merle	Episode: "Ah! Wilderness!"; Final television appearance
