= Out of the Fog (1941 film) =

1941 film by Anatole Litvak

- Theatrical release poster
- Directed by: Anatole Litvak
- Screenplay by: Robert Rossen; Jerry Wald; Richard Macaulay
- Based on: the play The Gentle People; 1939 play by Irwin Shaw
- Produced by: Hal B. Wallis
- Starring: John Garfield; Ida Lupino; Thomas Mitchell
- Cinematography: James Wong Howe
- Edited by: Warren Low
- Music by: Heinz Roemheld
- Production company: Warner Bros. Pictures
- Distributed by: Warner Bros. Pictures
- Release date: June 14, 1941 (United States)
- Running time: 85 minutes
- Country: United States
- Language: English

Out of the Fog (working title: Danger Harbor) is a 1941 American film noir crime drama directed by Anatole Litvak and starring John Garfield, Ida Lupino and Thomas Mitchell. The film was based on the play The Gentle People by Irwin Shaw. It was made and released by Warner Bros. Pictures.

== Plot ==
Brooklyn fishermen Jonah Goodwin and Olaf Johnson are threatened by extortionist gangster Harold Goff, who demands "protection" money of $5 a week. Jonah's daughter Stella falls in love with Goff, but Goff learns that Jonah plans to finance Stella's $190 trip to Cuba aboard an ocean liner. Knowing that Jonah has the money, Goff demands it from him. At a bath house, Jonah and Olaf plot to kill Goff. They lure him onto their boat, but Olaf loses his nerve and cannot kill Goff. However, Goff falls into the water and drowns. An inquest reveals that Goff was wanted for crimes in five cities. Jonah and Olaf recover the extorted money from Goff's wallet, which had been left on their boat.

== Cast ==
- John Garfield as Harold Goff
- Ida Lupino as Stella Goodwin
- Thomas Mitchell as Jonah Goodwin
- John Qualen as Olaf Johnson
- Eddie Albert as George Watkins
- George Tobias as Igor Propotkin
- Aline MacMahon as Florence Goodwin
- Jerome Cowan as Assistant district attorney
- Odette Myrtil as Caroline Pomponette
- Leo Gorcey as Eddie
- Robert Homans as Officer Magruder
- Bernard Gorcey as Sam Pepper
- Paul Harvey as Judge Moriarty

== Production ==
Several scenes in the film were staged in the style typical of New York's Group Theatre, which had produced the source play The Gentle People on Broadway in the late 1930s. The use of concurrent, back-and-forth conversations during the bath house scene in which Jonah and Olaf plot Goff's murder followed a pattern established by the Group Theatre.

== Reception ==
In a contemporary review for The New York Times, critic Bosley Crowther wrote: "'Out of the Fog' is a heavy and dreary recital of largely synthetic woes, laced with moderate suspense and spotted here and there with humor. It doesn't even come close to being a really good film, and if you want the honest truth, it is literally as old-fashioned as sin. ... It is mostly plot—conventional plot—with very little theme."

The Boston Globe praised Anatole Litvak's integration of Group Theatre style as "an interesting experiment in film technique" and wrote: "[I]t is refreshing to find a film in which new ideas are attempted, even if they do not always turn out superior to the tried-and-true methods of the past."

The film's box-office gross was lower than Warner Bros. had expected.
