= Philip Dorn =

Dutch actor (1901–1975)

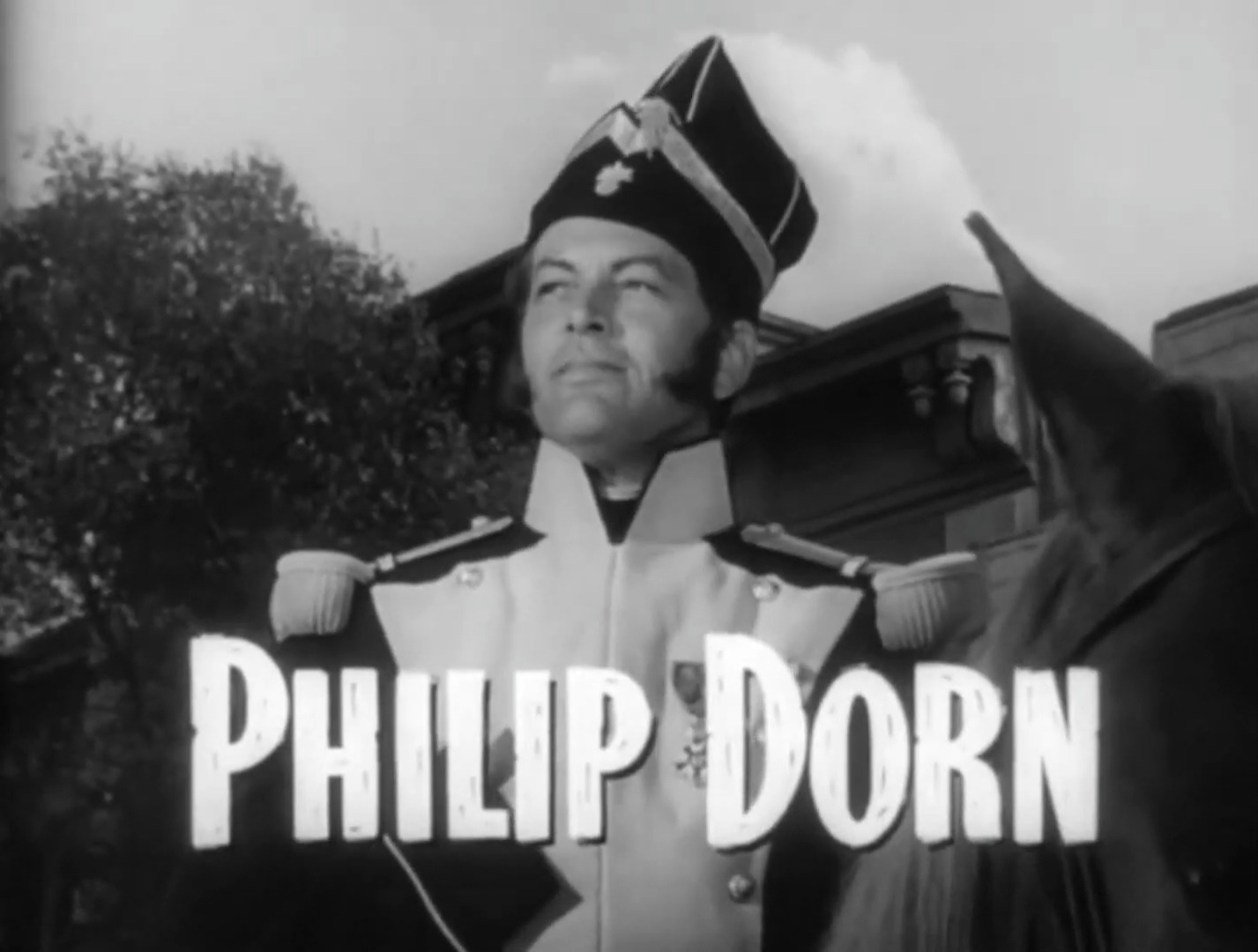
- Trailer for The Fighting Kentuckian (1949)
- Born: Hein van der Niet; 30 September 1901; Scheveningen, The Hague, Netherlands
- Died: 9 May 1975 (aged 73); Los Angeles, California, U.S.
- Resting place: Westwood Village Memorial Park Cemetery
- Other name: Frits van Dongen
- Occupation: Actor
- Years active: 1934–1955
- Spouses: Cornelia Maria Twilt (m. 1921; div. 1930) Marianne van Dam (m. 1933)

Philip Dorn (born Hein van der Niet; 30 September 1901 – 9 May 1975), sometimes billed as Frits van Dongen (his screen name for German films prior to World War II), was a Dutch American actor who had a career in Hollywood. He was best known for portraying the father in the film I Remember Mama (1948).

== Early years ==
Dorn was born in Scheveningen, The Hague, Netherlands in 1901 and made his stage début at age 14 in Dutch productions. He graduated from the Academy of Fine Arts and Architecture in Scheveningen. He served in Queen Wilhelmina's Royal Guards.

== Career ==
=== Netherlands ===
Dorn made his debut under the name of Frits van Dongen in Op Hoop van Zegen (1934) directed by Alex Benno. He had lead roles in De Big van het Regiment (1935), The Crosspatch (1935), Op Stap (1936), and Rubber (1936). He appeared on stage in Camille, Ghosts and Journey's End. He also toured Java with a theatrical company.

=== Germany ===
Dorn moved to Germany where he appeared in The Tiger of Eschnapur (1938) and its sequel The Indian Tomb (1938). He was also in Covered Tracks (1938) and The Journey to Tilsit (1939).

=== Hollywood ===
He moved to United States in August 1939, just a fortnight before World War II broke out. He went there at the urging of Henry Koster who had directed him in Holland.

Koster was at Universal and Dorn made three films for that studio: Enemy Agent (1940), Ski Patrol (1940), and Diamond Frontier (1940). Dorn went over to MGM where he had support roles in Escape (1940) and Ziegfeld Girl (1941).

Warners borrowed him to play the lead in Underground (1941). At MGM he had a support in Tarzan's Secret Treasure (1941) and they put him in a Dr. Kildare film, Born to be Bad, that had to be reshot when star Lew Ayres was fired due to being a conscientious objector. Dorn replaced him as a new doctor and the film was called Calling Dr. Gillespie (1942). He had a supporting part in Random Harvest (1942) and was third billed in Reunion in France (1942).

20th Century Fox gave him the lead role in Chetniks! The Fighting Guerrillas (1943), playing Draža Mihailović. That studio kept him on to star in Paris After Dark (1943). At Warner Bros he was fourth billed in Passage to Marseille (1944). MGM gave him the lead in a B, Blonde Fever (1944). At Warners he starred in Escape in the Desert (1945), a remake of The Petrified Forest replacing Zachary Scott.

In 1946, he appeared onstage with Claire Trevor in The Big Two. He was going to feature in Singapore but had to pull out when he fell ill with pneumonia. He appeared in I Remember Mama (1948) at RKO, then did The Fighting Kentuckian (1949) with John Wayne at Republic. He had supporting roles in Spy Hunt (1950) at Universal and Sealed Cargo (1951) at RKO.

=== Return to Germany ===
Back in Germany, Dorn starred in Behind Monastery Walls (1952), Towers of Silence (1952), Dreaming Lips (1953) and Salto Mortale (1953).

== Personal life ==
Dorn suffered from phlebitis, requiring surgery and causing a number of strokes. After an accident on stage, he retired in 1965 and spent the next 10 years of his life in his home in California.

He was married twice. His first wife (from 1921 to 1930) was Cornelia Maria Twilt. His second wife was Dutch actress Marianne van Dam. They were married from 1933 until his death in 1975.

== Death ==
Dorn died of a heart attack at the Motion Picture & Television Country House and Hospital in Woodland Hills, Los Angeles, California, on 9 May 1975. He was 73 years old. He was survived by his wife and a daughter.

== Partial filmography ==
=== As Frits van Dongen ===
- Op hoop van zegen (1934) – Geert – haar zoon
- De Big van het Regiment (1935) – Berkhage
- The Crosspatch or De Kribbebijter (1935) – Willy
- Op Stap (1935) – George van Reen
- Rubber (1936) – John van Laer
- The Tiger of Eschnapur (1938) – Maharadscha von Eschnapur
- Waltz Melodies (1938) or Immer wenn ich glücklich bin..! – Hans v. Waldenau
- The Indian Tomb (1938) or Das indische Grabmal – Maharadscha von Eschnapur
- Covered Tracks (1938) or Verwehte Spuren – Dr. Fernand Morot
- The Jumping Jack or Der Hampelmann (1938) – Peter
- The Journey to Tilsit or Die Reise nach Tilsit (1939) – Endrik Settegast

=== As Philip Dorn ===
- Enemy Agent (1940) – Doctor Jeffry Arnold
- Ski Patrol (1940) – Lt. Viktor Ryder
- Diamond Frontier (1940) – Jan Stafford De Winter
- Escape (1940) – Dr. Ditten
- Ziegfeld Girl (1941) – Franz Kolter
- Underground (1941) – Eric Franken
- Tarzan's Secret Treasure (1941) – Vandermeer
- Calling Dr. Gillespie (1942) – Dr. John Hunter Gerniede
- Random Harvest (1942) – Dr. Jonathan Benet
- Reunion in France (1942) – Robert Cortot
- Chetniks! The Fighting Guerrillas (1943) – Draza Mihailovic
- Paris After Dark (1943) – Jean Blanchard
- Passage to Marseille (1944) – Renault
- Blonde Fever (1944) – Peter Donay
- Escape in the Desert (1945) – Philip Artveld
- I've Always Loved You (1946) – Leopold Goronoff
- I Remember Mama (1948) – Papa
- The Fighting Kentuckian (1949) – Col. Georges Geraud
- Spy Hunt (1950) – Paul Kopel
- Sealed Cargo (1951) – Konrad
- Behind Monastery Walls (1952, or Hinter Klostermauern) – Thomas Holinka

=== As Frits van Dongen ===
- Towers of Silence or Türme des Schweigens (1952) – Captain de Vries
- Dreaming Lips or Der träumende Mund (1953) – Michael
- Salto Mortale (1953) – Cadenos (final film role)

== Bibliography ==
- Ingo Schiweck/Hans Toonen Maharadscha, Tschetnik, Kriegsheimkehrer : der Schauspieler Frits van Dongen oder Philip Dorn , Osnabrück 2003. ISBN 3-89959-058-9
- Hans Toonen "Nederlands Eerste Hollywood-Ster
- Leo Deege "From Nazi Occupied Holland to the Jungles of Vietnam-An Immigrant Story, Denver, Colorado, 2015. ISBN 978-1-4787-6470-0
