= Fred Aldrich =

American film and television actor (1904–1979)

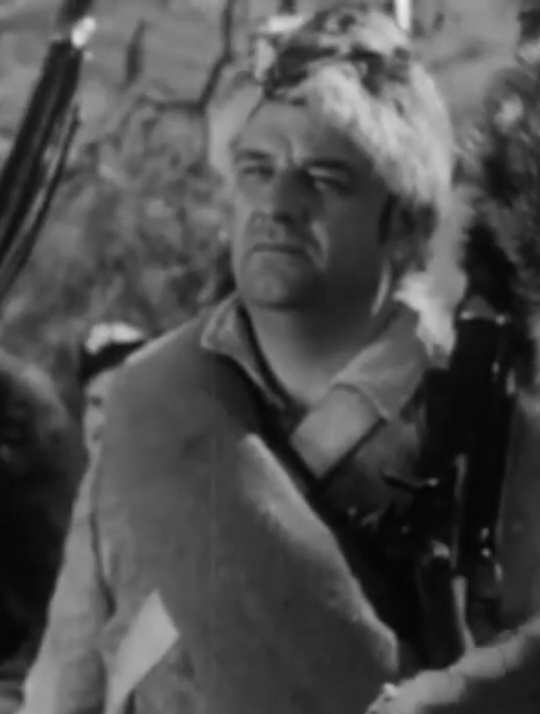
- Aldrich in the trailer for The Fighting Kentuckian (1949)
- Born: December 23, 1904; New York City, U.S.
- Died: January 25, 1979 (aged 74); Los Angeles, California, U.S.
- Occupation: Actor
- Years active: 1939–1969

Fred Aldrich (December 23, 1904 – January 25, 1979) was an American film and television actor. Born in New York. He broke into the film industry in 1939, appearing in two films that year in small roles: My Son Is Guilty, and the notable, Confessions of a Nazi Spy, which starred Edward G. Robinson and George Sanders. In the course of his thirty-year career he appeared in over 170 films, in small and bit roles. With the advent of television, Aldrich worked in that medium as well, making his first small screen appearance on I Love Lucy, on which he appeared numerous times over the life of the series.

== Career ==
Over the course of his film career he would appear in such notable films as: Kitty Foyle (1940), starring Ginger Rogers and Dennis Morgan; 1945's The Picture of Dorian Gray, starring George Sanders; Tycoon (1947), starring John Wayne and Laraine Day; A Connecticut Yankee in King Arthur's Court, with Bing Crosby and Rhonda Fleming; Young Man with a Horn, starring Kirk Douglas, Lauren Bacall, and Doris Day; the Spencer Tracy and Katharine Hepburn vehicle, Pat and Mike (1952); again with Paul Newman in 1956's Somebody Up There Likes Me; The Last Angry Man, starring Paul Muni; with Rock Hudson and Doris Day in Lover Come Back (1961); the spy spoof, Our Man Flint (1966), starring James Coburn; and 1967's A Big Hand for the Little Lady, starring Henry Fonda, Joanne Woodward, and Jason Robards.

Aldrich made an appearance to the 1956 film The Conqueror, which starred John Wayne and Susan Hayward. His television credits include appearances on such shows as The Rifleman, Have Gun - Will Travel, Bat Masterson, The Untouchables, Gunsmoke, Rawhide, and Perry Mason.

== Death ==
Aldrich died on January 25, 1979, in Los Angeles, California, at the age of 74.
