= The Groom Wore Spurs =

1951 film by Richard Whorf

- Directed by: Richard Whorf
- Screenplay by: Robert Libott; Frank Burt
- Story by: Robert Carson
- Produced by: Howard Welsch
- Starring: Ginger Rogers; Jack Carson
- Cinematography: J. Peverell Marley
- Edited by: Otto Ludwig
- Music by: Arthur Lange; Emil Newman
- Production company: Fidelity Pictures Corporation
- Distributed by: Universal Pictures
- Release dates: January 23, 1951 (Los Angeles); February 2, 1951 (Minnesota); February 27, 1951 (San Francisco); March 13, 1951 (New York City)
- Running time: 81 minutes
- Country: United States
- Language: English

The Groom Wore Spurs is a 1951 American comedy film directed by Richard Whorf and starring Ginger Rogers and Jack Carson.

== Plot ==
Hollywood singing cowboy Ben Castle hires lawyer A. J. Furnival to help him overcome gambling debts to Harry Kallen that he incurred in Las Vegas. Kallen recognises A. J. as the daughter of a legendary attorney who had helped him on several occasions. Castle seduces A. J. into a quick wedding with Kallen, forgiving Castle his debts. A. J. discovers that Castle schemed the entire meeting and wedding with the intended result. Encouraged by her roommate Alice, A. J. seeks revenge by living with him. She settles Castle's film contract and then discovers that he is a milquetoast who is unable to ride a horse or sing. Gangsters try to frame Castle with a murder.

== Cast ==
- Ginger Rogers as A. J. Furnival
- Jack Carson as Ben Castle
- Joan Davis as Alice Dean
- Stanley Ridges as Harry Kallen
- John Litel as Uncle George
- James Brown as Steve Hall
- Victor Sen Yung as Ignacio
- Mira McKinney as Mrs. Forbes
- Gordon Nelson as Ricky
- George Meader as Bellboy at the Lariat
- Kemp Niver as Killer
- Robert Williams as Jake Harris

== Soundtrack ==
- "No More Wandrin' Around" (Music by Emil Newman, lyrics by Leon Pober)

== Reception ==
In a contemporary review for The New York Times, critic Bosley Crowther wrote: "Pity poor Ginger Rogers. In a thing called 'The Groom Wore Spurs,' an utterly lustreless item, ... she has to struggle with an assignment that would make any actress look like a chump—the sort of assignment, in fact, that has made many a lesser actress and audience writhe in pain. ... The only thing funny about this picture is that it is called a Fidelity film."
