= De Big van het Regiment =

1935 film

- Directed by: Max Nosseck
- Written by: Herman Bouber (dialogue); Arnold Lippschitz (writer)
- Release date: 19 April 1935
- Running time: 105 minutes
- Country: Netherlands
- Language: Dutch

De Big van het Regiment is a 1935 Dutch film directed by Max Nosseck.

== Plot ==
In 1915, many Belgian citizens are forced to flee to the Netherlands as a result of World War 1. Lieutenant Berkhage is sent to the Dutch-Belgian border to keep order among the stream of refugees. A refugee child is then pushed into his arms. The child quickly becomes the regiment's mascot.

== Cast ==
- Philip Dorn ... Berkhage (as Frits van Dongen)
- Fien de la Mar ... Fietje
- Heintje Davids ... Annemie
- Jopie Koopman ... Nora
- Sylvain Poons ... Maupie
- Johan Kaart ... Jan Adriaanse (as Johan Kaart jr.)
- Adolphe Engers ... Kruitnagel
- Hansje Anderiesen ... De Big (as Jansje Anderiesen)
- Matthieu van Eysden ... Piet
- Jan Van Ees ... Army Officer
- Piet Te Nuyl (as Piet te Nuyl sr.)
- Jan C. De Vos (as Jan C. de Vos jr.)
- Jac. Van Bijlevelt
- Cruys Voorbergh
- Jan van Dommelen ... Vader van Nora
