= Behind Monastery Walls (1952 film) =

1952 film

- Directed by: Harald Reinl
- Written by: Erich Kröhnke; Hans Naderer (play); Harald Reinl
- Produced by: Walter Traut; Olga Chekhova
- Starring: Olga Chekhova; Philip Dorn; Katharina Mayberg
- Cinematography: Franz Koch
- Edited by: J. Joachim Bartsch
- Music by: Giuseppe Becce
- Production company: Delta Film
- Distributed by: Neue Filmverleih
- Release date: 22 April 1952
- Running time: 99 minutes
- Country: West Germany
- Language: German

Behind Monastery Walls (German: Hinter Klostermauern) is a 1952 West German drama film directed by Harald Reinl and starring Olga Chekhova, Philip Dorn and Katharina Mayberg. It takes place in a priory and is sometimes known by the alternative title of The Unholy Intruders. It was shot at the Bavaria Studios in Munich. The film's sets were designed by the art directors Robert Herlth and Gottfried Will.

== Synopsis ==
Thomas Holinka, a disillusioned veteran of the Second World War, returns from a prisoner of war camp. Having no home, he chooses to live in an seemingly abandoned priory. However, the nuns then return to the site, leading to conflict over his wayward lifestyle.

== Cast ==
- Olga Chekhova as Priorin
- Philip Dorn as Thomas Holinka
- Katharina Mayberg as Kathrin
- Dorothea Wieck as Subpriorin
- Margit Saad as Schwester Romana
- Margarete Haagen as Prokuratorin
- Walter Janssen as Dr. Riedinger
- Hedwig Bleibtreu
- Harald Holberg as Joschi Panek
- Hanna Ralph as Generaloberin
- Peter Fischer as Peter, 4 Jahre alt
- Jochen Hauer as Oberwachtmeister
- Sibylle von Gymnich as Lektorin
- Anton Färber as Bürgermeister
- Lisa Helwig
- Bertha Picard
- Max Greger as Bandleader of a tanzorchester
- Münchner Philharmoniker
- Teddy Turai
- Rieve von Kortens

== Bibliography ==
- James Robert Parish & Kingsley Canham. Film Directors Guide: Western Europe. Scarecrow Press, 1976.
