= Marjorie Riordan =

American motion picture actress (1921 - 1984)

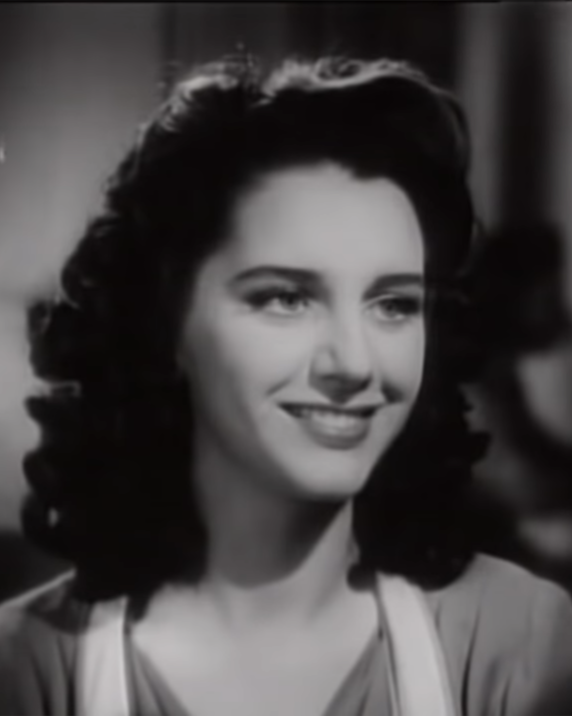
- Marjorie Riordan in Stage Door Canteen 1943
- Born: Marjorie Jane Riordan; January 24, 1920; Washington, D.C., U.S.
- Died: March 8, 1984 (aged 64)
- Resting place: Westwood Village Memorial Park
- Occupations: Actress, model, clinical psychologist
- Spouses: George Thurman Lumpkin (m. 1945, divorced) Allan Schlaff (m. 1958; died 1972)
- Children: 1

Marjorie Riordan (January 24, 1920 – March 8, 1984) was an American motion picture actress, model, and clinical psychologist.

== Early years ==
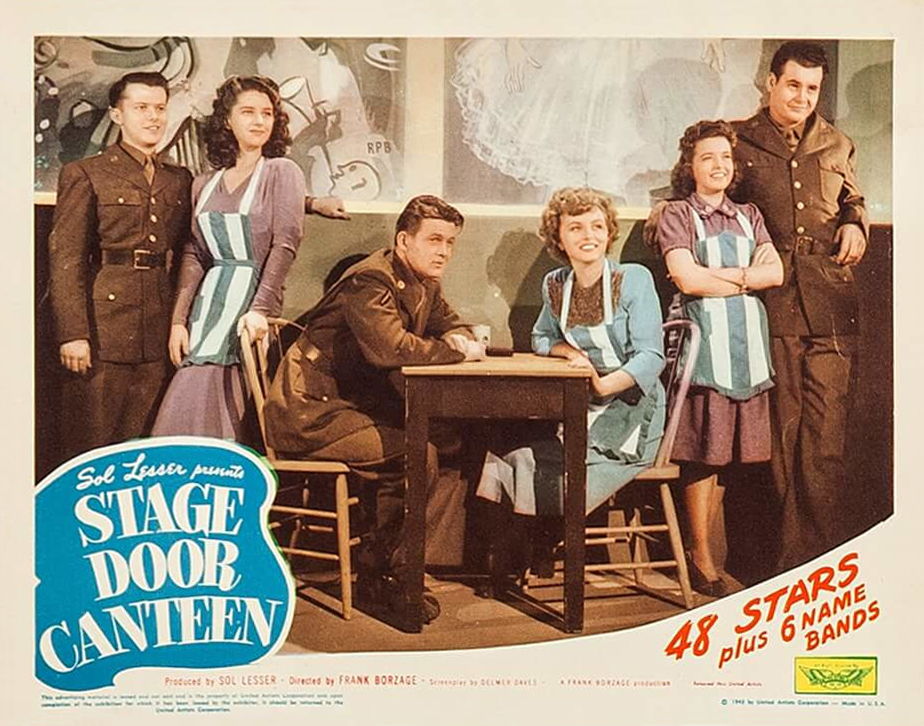
Lobby card for the 1943 film Stage Door Canteen with Lon McCallister, Marjorie Riordan, William Terry, Cheryl Walker, Margaret Early, and Sunset Carson (as Michael Harrison).

Riordan was born in Washington, D.C., USA. Her family relocated to Milwaukee, Wisconsin, where she attended high school and later studied drama for two years at the University of Wisconsin from 1937 to 1939, before moving to Los Angeles, California.

== Career ==
Her interest in movies grew while living near the motion picture studios, but she first took a job working as a doctor's secretary and assistant, then using her spare time to look for film-related jobs on the side. While modelling in Los Angeles and making uncredited appearances in films, she was chosen for a small role in the wartime B-movie melodrama Parachute Nurse (1942).

The Hollywood producer Sol Lesser and later president of the Sol Lesser Productions Inc., often looking for new faces and unknown talent, signed Riordan as a contract player after she approached him about possible roles. Riordan made her debut in the Lesser film, Stage Door Canteen (1943), a morale boosting musical revue picture made during World War II, where she played actor Lon McAllister’s girl of interest in the story, before his character “California” received assignment orders to leave for the war. Many well known film screen, stage and radio stars were featured in the films various stage performances, but Lesser purposely went against conventions and cast other unknowns for the main story acting roles. The other newly contracted players featured in addition to Riordan included Lon McCallister, Margaret Early, Sunset Carson (as Michael Harrison) and Cheryl Walker, a former “stand-in” for actresses Veronica Lake, Claudette Colbert and Madeleine Carroll.

Shortly afterwards, Riordan's contract was transferred to Warner Bros. where she was cast as Bette Davis's daughter Fanny Jr. in Mr. Skeffington (1944). In 1945, she went on to act alongside Basil Rathbone and Nigel Bruce in a Universal Pictures produced film titled Pursuit to Algiers (1945) where she had both an acting and singing performance role.

Riordan often took part in various activities related to the war effort campaigns that were common during 1941–1945 by participating in USO canteen activities and other services that were provided to enlisted U.S. military members. She also assisted in the fundraising efforts that were part of the joint Navy and Red Cross campaign to sell war bonds to help raise money that would go towards building the cruiser USS Los Angeles. The wartime effort activities she participated in along with the increased visibility that the film Stage Door Canteen had brought, and her modelling experience, lead her to also be promoted as a pin-up beauty among G.Is. On June 25, 1945, as part of the widespread “help the war effort campaigns”, the California department of motor vehicles bestowed the title of “Share - the - Ride - Girl” upon Riordan to help the war effort by encouraging motorist to share their cars.

She continued to appear in film supporting roles into the 1950s, while attending graduate school to study speech pathology, which later evolved into the study of clinical psychology. After she further developed a career as a clinical psychologist, she eventually gave up acting altogether.

== Personal life ==
Riordan's real life seemed to echo the role she had played in the film Stage Door Canteen (1943). While entertaining at a serviceman's canteen event, she met a Marine major named George T. Lumpkin, and they married in 1945. After her first marriage ended, she later married Allan Schlaff, a PhD fellow clinical psychologist, on February 21, 1958. Schlaff died in 1972. Riordan died in 1984 of breast cancer.

== Filmography ==
- Parachute Nurse (1942) - Wendie Holmes (as Marjorie Reardon)
- Stage Door Canteen (1943) - Jean (Principal cast)
- Mr. Skeffington (1944) - Fanny Jr.
- Navy Nurse (1945) - Nurse
- Pursuit to Algiers (1945) - Sheila Woodbury
- Three Strangers (1946) - Janet Elliott
- South of Monterey (1946) - Maria Morales
- The Hoodlum (1951) - Eileen
- Racket Squad (1951) - one episode, S2.E14: ‘’Five Star Swindle’’
