= Margaret Early =

American actress (1919–2000)

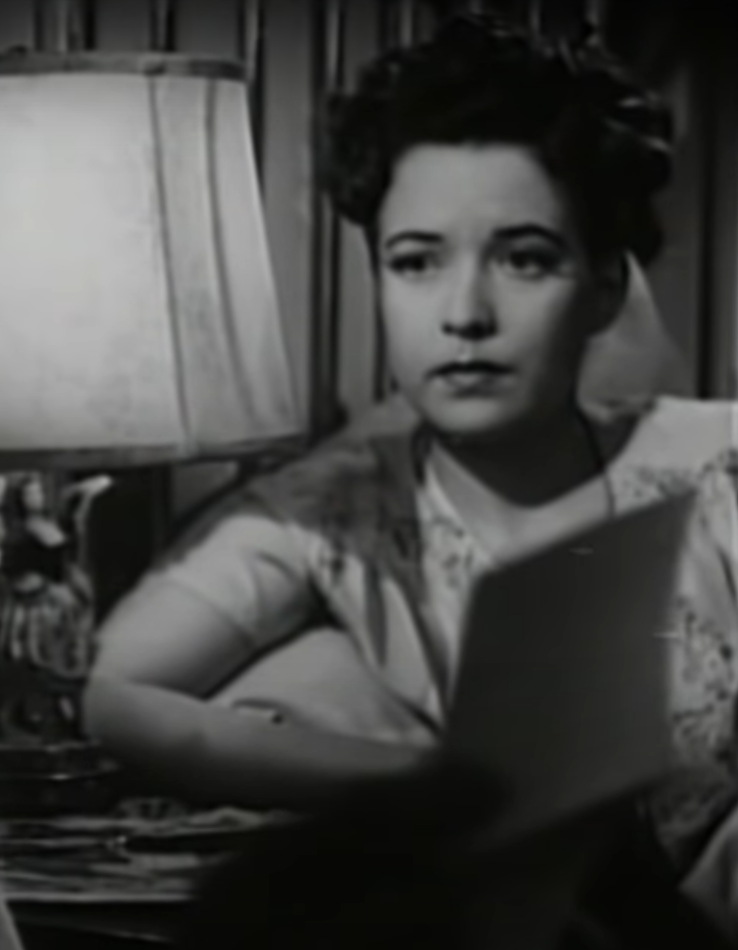
- Early in Stage Door Canteen (1943)
- Born: December 25, 1919; Birmingham, Alabama, U.S.
- Died: November 29, 2000 (aged 80); Laguna Beach, California, U.S.
- Resting place: Pacific View Memorial Park, Corona del Mar, California
- Occupation: Actress
- Years active: 1937–1946
- Spouse(s): Wales Wallace (m. 19??)

Margaret Early (December 25, 1919 – November 29, 2000) was an American film actress who was active in Hollywood during the 1930s and 1940s. She is best remembered for her endearing Southern charm.

== Life and career ==
Born on Christmas Day 1919 into a devout Episcopal family, she grew up on a farm near Birmingham, Alabama.. She came to Hollywood with her father on a business trip, and was asked to try out for a role in Harold Lloyd's Beverly Hills Little Theatre for Professionals production where Gregory La Cava saw her perform. Eventually, she was signed with RKO. Her Southern accent was called "as sweet and thick as cream," in a column by Donald Kirkley for The Baltimore Sun.

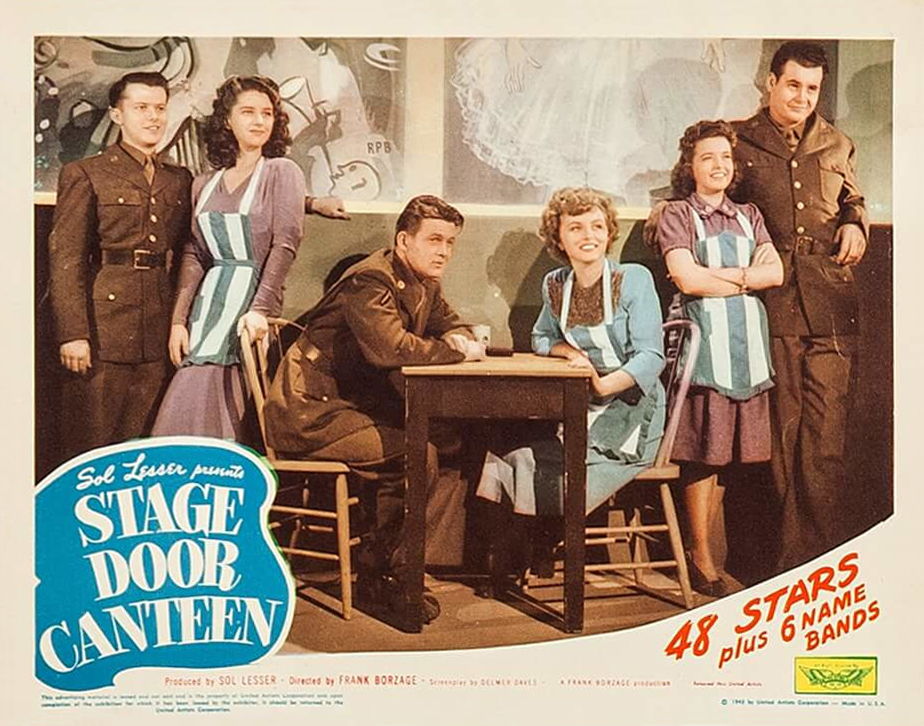
Lon McCallister, Marjorie Riordan, William Terry, Cheryl Walker, Margaret Early and Michael Harrison in Stage Door Canteen (1943)

Her first screen role came in Stage Door (1937) opposite Katharine Hepburn, Ginger Rogers, and Adolphe Menjou. Her next role came at Warner Bros. Studios playing Spring Byington's daughter in Jezebel (1938) opposite the likes of George Brent, Bette Davis, and Fay Bainter. She later became a freelance actress and found herself working in various roles at such studios as RKO, Warner Bros., and Metro-Goldwyn-Mayer. Her other screen roles include parts in Judge Hardy and Son (1939), Strike Up The Band (1940), Andy Hardy's Private Secretary (1941), and Stage Door Canteen (1943). She made her last screen appearance in Cinderella Jones (1946). She spent the remainder of her days living in Laguna Beach, California, being active in her church and the Republican party. She was good friends with Cheryl Walker, Mickey Rooney, Bette Davis, Ginger Rogers, Katharine Hepburn, Laraine Day, Henry Fonda, Cary Grant, Joel McCrea, and Dennis Morgan.

== Death ==
On November 29, 2000, Margaret Early died at her home in Laguna Beach, California, from congestive heart failure at age 80. She is interred at Pacific View Memorial Park, Bayview Terrace, Lot 9F, in Corona del Mar, California.

== Filmography ==
- Stage Door (1937)
- Jezebel (1938) as Stephanie Kendrick
- The Young in Heart (1938)
- Swing That Cheer (1938)
- Judge Hardy and Son (1939)
- Forty Little Mothers (1940)
- Strike Up the Band (1940)
- Andy Hardy's Private Secretary (1941)
- Small Town Deb (1941)
- To the Shores of Tripoli (1942)
- Stage Door Canteen (1943)
- Three Is a Family (1944)
- Cinderella Jones (1946)
