= The Hoodlum =

The Hoodlum may refer to:

- The Hoodlum (1919 film), a comedy-drama film starring Mary Pickford
- The Hoodlum (1951 film), a crime film featuring Lawrence Tierney

== See also ==
- Hoodlum (film), a 1997 crime film starring Laurence Fishburne, Tim Roth and Vanessa Williams
