= Andrea King filmography =

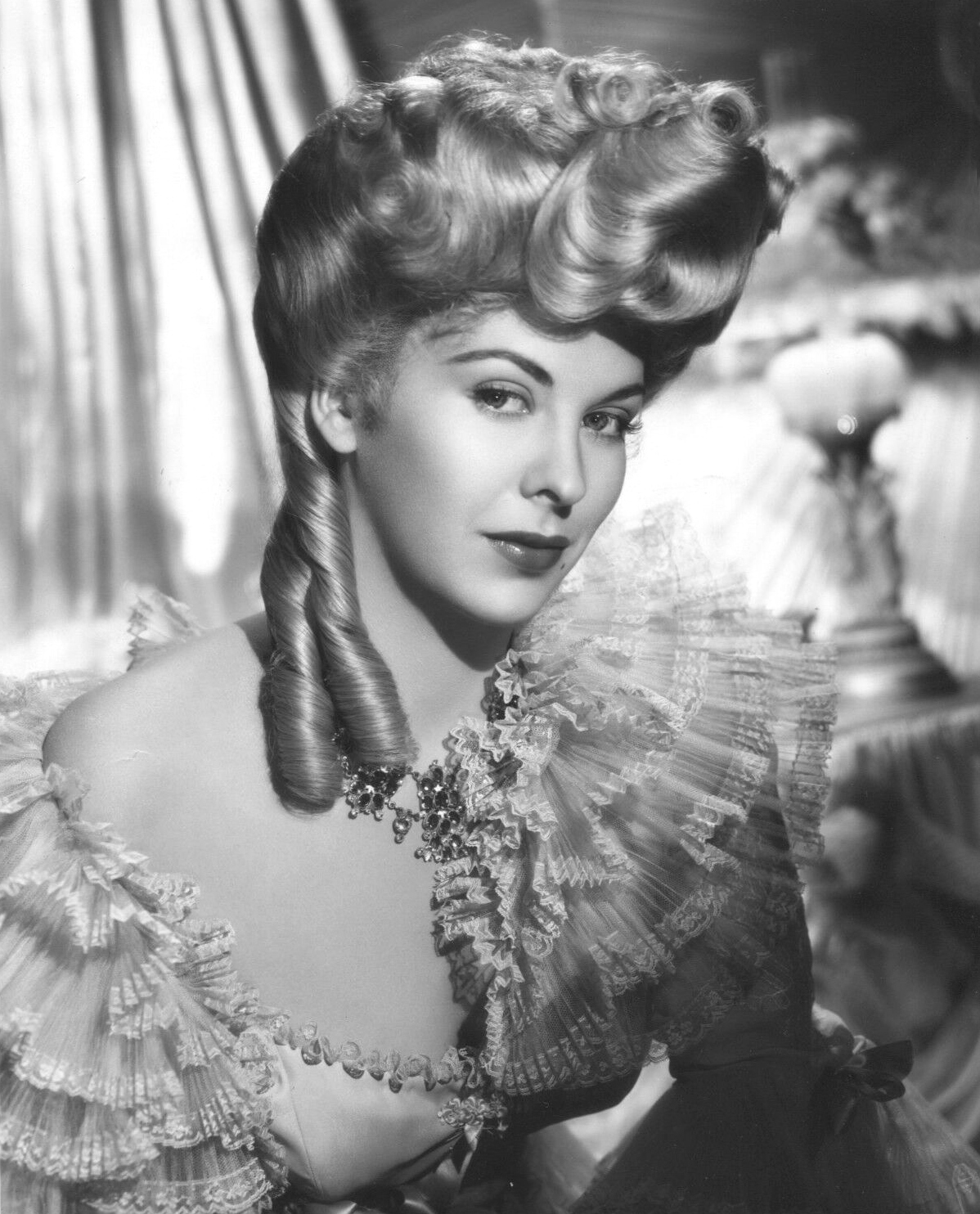
King in a publicity portrait for My Wild Irish Rose (1947)

This is the complete filmography of actress Andrea King (1919–2003).

== Film and television appearances ==
Year	Title	Role	Notes
1940	The Ramparts We Watch	Hilda Bensinger	Credited as Georgette McKee
1944	Hollywood Canteen	Herself	
1944	Mr. Skeffington	Dr. Byles' Nurse	Uncredited
1944	Proudly We Serve	Sgt. Christy Marlowe	Short film
1944	The Very Thought of You	Molly Wheeler	
1945	God Is My Co-Pilot	Catherine Scott	
1945	Hotel Berlin	Lisa Dorn	
1945	It Happened in Springfield		Short film about The Springfield Plan
1945	Navy Nurse	Nurse Reilly	Short film
1945	Roughly Speaking	Barbara (ages 21–29)	
1946	The Beast with Five Fingers	Julie Holden	
1946	Shadow of a Woman	Brooke Gifford Ryder	
1947	The Man I Love	Sally Otis	
1947	My Wild Irish Rose	Lillian Russell	
1947	Ride the Pink Horse	Marjorie Lundeen	
1948	Mr. Peabody and the Mermaid	Cathy Livingston	
1949	Song of Surrender	Phyllis Cantwell	
1950	Buccaneer's Girl	Arlene Villon	
1950	Dial 1119	Helen	
1950	I Was a Shoplifter	Ina Perdue	
1950	Southside 1-1000	Nora Craig	
1950	Stump The Stars	Herself	
1951	The Lemon Drop Kid	Stella	
1951	The Mark of the Renegade	Anita Gonzales	
1952–53	Chevron Theatre		Episodes: "Long Long Ago", "Summer Night"
1952-1954	Fireside Theatre	various roles	Episodes: "The Kiss", "The Uncrossed River", "Man of the Comstock", "In the Carquinez Woods", "The Deauville Bracelet", "The Hitchhiker", "Mission to Algiers", "The Sheriff"
1952	Four Star Playhouse	Sidonie	Episode: "The Officer and the Lady"
1952	Gruen Guild Playhouse	Mildred Price	Episode: "Dream Man"
1952	Red Planet Mars	Linda Cronyn	
1952	The World in His Arms	Mamie	
1953	Lux Video Theatre	Romaine Vole / Mrs. Mogson	Episode: "Witness for the Prosecution"
1953	Schlitz Playhouse of Stars	Dr. Janice Blake	Episode: "Medicine Woman"
1953	Your Play Time		Episode: "Long, Long Ago"
1954	The Pepsi-Cola Playhouse	Harriet Grant	Episodes: "Long, Long Ago", "Taps for a Hoofer"
1954	City Detective	Helen Valentine / Cecilia	Episodes: "Drop Coin Here", "Her Sister's Keeper"
1956	Cheyenne	Julie Montaine	Episode: "The Law Man"
1956	Crossroads	Ann	Episode: "Tenement Saint"
1956	Crusader	Sari	Episode: "The Adoption"
1956	Matinee Theatre		Episode: "Whom Death Has Joined Together"
1956	Silent Fear	Terri Perreau	
1957	Band of Angels	Miss Idell	
1957	Outlaw Queen	Christina	
1958	Darby's Rangers	Mrs. Sheilah Andrews	
1958-1959	Mike Hammer	various roles	Episodes: "Swing Low, Sweet Harriet", "That Schoolgirl Complex"
1958-1959	State Trooper	various roles	Episodes: "The Night Has a Thousand Eyes", "Sweet & Gentle, Ltd.", "The Black Leaper"
1959-1960	The Alaskans	Duchess	Episodes: "The Devil Made Fire", "The Blizzard"
1959	Bourbon Street Beat	Sybil Dole	Episode: "Portrait of Lenore"
1959	Maverick	Mae Miller	Episode: "Two Tickets to Ten Strike"
1959-1963	Perry Mason	various roles	Episodes: "The Case of the Surplus Suitor", "The Case of the Missing Melody", "The Case of the Singular Double", "The Case of the Bedeviled Doctor"
1959	Tightrope!	Martha Smith	Episode: "The Cracking Point"
1960-1963	77 Sunset Strip	various roles	Episodes: "Terror in Silence", "Nightmare", "Condor's Lair"
1960	Dante	Crystal	Episode: "The Jolly Roger Cocktail"
1960	The Donna Reed Show	Wanda Harman	Episode: "The Mystery Woman"
1960	General Electric Theater	Editor	Episode: "Do Not Disturb"
1960-1962	Hawaiian Eye	various roles	Episodes: "Big Fever", "The Pretty People", "Bequest of Arthur Goodwin"
1960	Johnny Midnight	various roles	Episodes: "Pay-Off to Death", "Slight Delay at Dimity"
1960	Lock-Up	various roles	Episodes: "Mrs. Hunter", "The Locket"
1961	Shotgun Slade	Chelsey Blair	Episode: "Little Sister"
1962	Surfside 6	Martha Wilder	Episode: "Squeeze Play"
1963	Arrest and Trial	Dr. Koerner	Episode: "Call It a Lifetime"
1963	GE True	Ruby Darrow	Episode: "Defendant: Clarence Darrow"
1965	House of the Black Death	Dr. Katherine Mallory	
1965	Valentine's Day	Rachel Landers	Episode: "Climb Upon My Knee, Sonny Boy"
1967-1969	Dragnet	various roles	Episodes: "D.H.Q.: Missing Person", "The Big Kids"
1967	Family Affair	Mrs. Florence Gaynor	Episode: "All Around the Town"
1968	Prescription: Murder	Cynthia Gordon	TV movie
1969	Daddy's Gone A-Hunting	Brenda Frazier	Uncredited
1973	The New Perry Mason	Claire Henry	Episode: "The Case of the Deadly Deeds"
1973	Blackenstein	Eleanor	
1975	Medical Center	Susan	Episode: "One Last Rebellion"
1990	The Color of Evening	Gallery Customer	
1990	Murder, She Wrote	Housekeeper	Episode: "The Fixer-Upper"
1991	The Linguini Incident	Charlotte	
1994	Inevitable Grace	Dorothy	
1996	Biography: Peter Lorre - The Master of Menace	Herself	
1998	Biography: Montgomery Clift - The Hidden Star	Herself	
