= Cinderella Jones =

1946 American musical comedy film

- Theatrical release poster
- Directed by: Busby Berkeley
- Screenplay by: Charles Hoffman
- Based on: Judy Adjudicates; 1943 story Red Book Magazine by Philip Wylie
- Produced by: Alex Gottlieb
- Starring: Joan Leslie; Robert Alda; Julie Bishop; William Prince; S. Z. Sakall; Edward Everett Horton
- Cinematography: Sol Polito
- Edited by: George Amy
- Music by: Friedrich Hollaender
- Production company: Warner Bros. Pictures
- Distributed by: Warner Bros. Pictures
- Release date: March 9, 1946
- Running time: 91 minutes
- Country: United States
- Language: English

Cinderella Jones is a 1946 American musical comedy film directed by Busby Berkeley and written by Charles Hoffman. The film stars Joan Leslie, Robert Alda, Julie Bishop, William Prince, S. Z. Sakall, and Edward Everett Horton. The film was released by Warner Bros. Pictures on March 9, 1946.

== Plot ==
At the law firm Minland, Mahoney and Krencher, the namesake attorneys learn that Judy Jones is entitled to inherit her late uncle's $10 million fortune on the condition she must marry an intellectual genius within two weeks. When the law firm fails to find her immediately, they launch an advertising campaign to find her. The reward for finding the real Judy is $374.26.

The real Judy Jones works as a nightclub singer for her boyfriend Tommy Coles's big band radio program. Tommy believes she is the real Judy, who remembers her uncle was an archeologist. The next day, Judy arrives at the law firm with an antique shrunken head and details her family history, which the attorneys verify as accurate.

After she learns she must marry an intellectual, Judy decides to enroll at an all-male elite university using a pseudonym. However, she is quickly found out, but is allowed by Professor Popik to finish the exam because she's attractive. She completely fails the exam, but Popik persuades the college board of trustees to keep her enrolled because of her fortune. On the day she moves into her dormitory, Professor Bart Williams tells Judy she is ineligible to attend. However, he changes his mind when she learns Judy's fortune could pay for a new chemistry laboratory.

To ensure she stays on campus, Judy takes a waitress job at the campus coffee shop. When Bart makes an order, Judy accidentally serves him a sandwich with a bar of soap. In response, Bart angrily tells her that she represents everything he hates about women. Tommy arrives in the shop and tries to defend Judy, but Bart knocks him unconscious, which impresses Judy.

Popik is convinced that Judy and Bart's difficult relationship will blossom into love. He invites Tommy's band onto the campus to perform, in hopes it would bring Judy and Bart together. However, Bart accidentally eats another sandwich with soap and hastily leaves the shop, where he again knocks out Tommy. Later that night, Popik is arrested and jailed under suspicion of being an axe murderer. He escapes from prison with help from Bart, and is later acquitted during trial.

As the marriage deadline approaches, Judy invites Tommy's band to a charity bazaar near a lakeshore resort. Popik conspires with the lawyers, who are also at the resort, to bring Judy and Bart together. Mr. Keating, a professor, rows Judy out into the middle of the lake and deliberately overturns the boat. Popik brings Williams, who swims out to rescue Judy. While in the water, Bart proposes to Judy.

During their drive to Nevada to be married, a police officer stops Judy, Bart, Tommy, Popik, and the attorneys for speeding. Inside the jail cell, Tommy confesses he graduated law school and was a former quiz kid. Impressed by Tommy's legal knowledge, Judy falls for him. Meanwhile, the real axe murderer is arrested. The next morning, they are released but during their drive, they are stopped by a parade of returning soldiers. Nevertheless, a military chaplain officiates the marriage between Judy and Tommy.

== Cast ==
- Joan Leslie as Judy Jones
- Robert Alda as Tommy Coles
- Julie Bishop as Camille
- William Prince as Bartholomew Williams
- S. Z. Sakall as Gabriel Popik
- Edward Everett Horton as Keating
- Charles Dingle as Minland
- Ruth Donnelly as Cora Elliot
- Elisha Cook, Jr. as Oliver S. Patch
- Hobart Cavanaugh as George
- Charles Arnt as Mahoney
- Chester Clute as Krencher
- Edward Gargan as Riley
- Margaret Early as Bashful Girl
- Johnny Mitchell as Soldier
- Mary Dean as Singer
- Monte Blue as Jailer
- Marianne O'Brien as Marie
- Marion Martin as Burlesque Queen

== Reception ==
Bosley Crowther of The New York Times wrote, "If you can imagine a combination of a Nineteen Thirties "college musical" and a second-rate silent slapstick shot completely 'off the cuff,' then you can picture in your mind's eye the Warners' Cinderella Jones, a little package of fluff and painful cut-ups which came to the Strand yesterday. And we trust that you can so imagine, for it would be very difficult indeed to convey a more accurate impression of this nonsensical and amateurish film."
