= Secrets of a Model =

1940 film

- Directed by: Sam Newfield
- Written by: Sherman L. Lowe; Arthur St. Claire
- Produced by: J.D. Kendis
- Starring: Cheryl Walker; Harold Daniels; Phyllis Barry
- Cinematography: Jack Greenhalgh
- Edited by: George M. Merrick
- Production company: Jay-Dee-Kay Productions
- Distributed by: Continental Pictures
- Release date: 11 April 1940
- Running time: 65 minutes
- Country: United States
- Language: English

Secrets of a Model is a 1940 American drama film directed by Sam Newfield and starring Cheryl Walker, Harold Daniels and Phyllis Barry. It was made as an independent exploitation film on Poverty Row.

In the film, a waitress agrees to work as an artist's model. She has a one-night-stand with a wealthy man while drunk, and afterwards experiences a decline in both her health and her work life. She wakes up in a hospital, and later learns that the wealthy man is trying to seduce her former roommate.

== Plot ==
In order to raise money for her mother's operation, waitress Rita Wilson turns to modelling for a sculpture. She encounters the wealthy Jack Thorndyke and after getting drunk at a party at his penthouse apartment, he takes advantage of her. She contracts a mystery illness and Jack refuses all her calls.

After that, she goes through a succession of increasing dead-end jobs and then faints in the street. Waking up in hospital, she is reunited with her old boyfriend, milkman Bob Grey. After recovering and agreeing to marry Bob, she now discovers that Jack Thorndyke is now trying the same tricks on her former roommate Sally.

== Cast ==
- Cheryl Walker as Rita Wilson
- Harold Daniels as Jack Thorndyke
- Julian Madison as Bob Grey
- Phyllis Barry as Sally Adams
- Bobby Watson as Stuart Bannerman
- Grace Lenard as Jo Jo
- Eddie Borden as Customer
- Donald Kerr as Drunk at Party

== Bibliography ==
- Pitts, Michael R. Poverty Row Studios, 1929–1940. McFarland & Company, 2005.
