= Lisa Golm =

German character actress (1891–1964)

- ליסה גולם
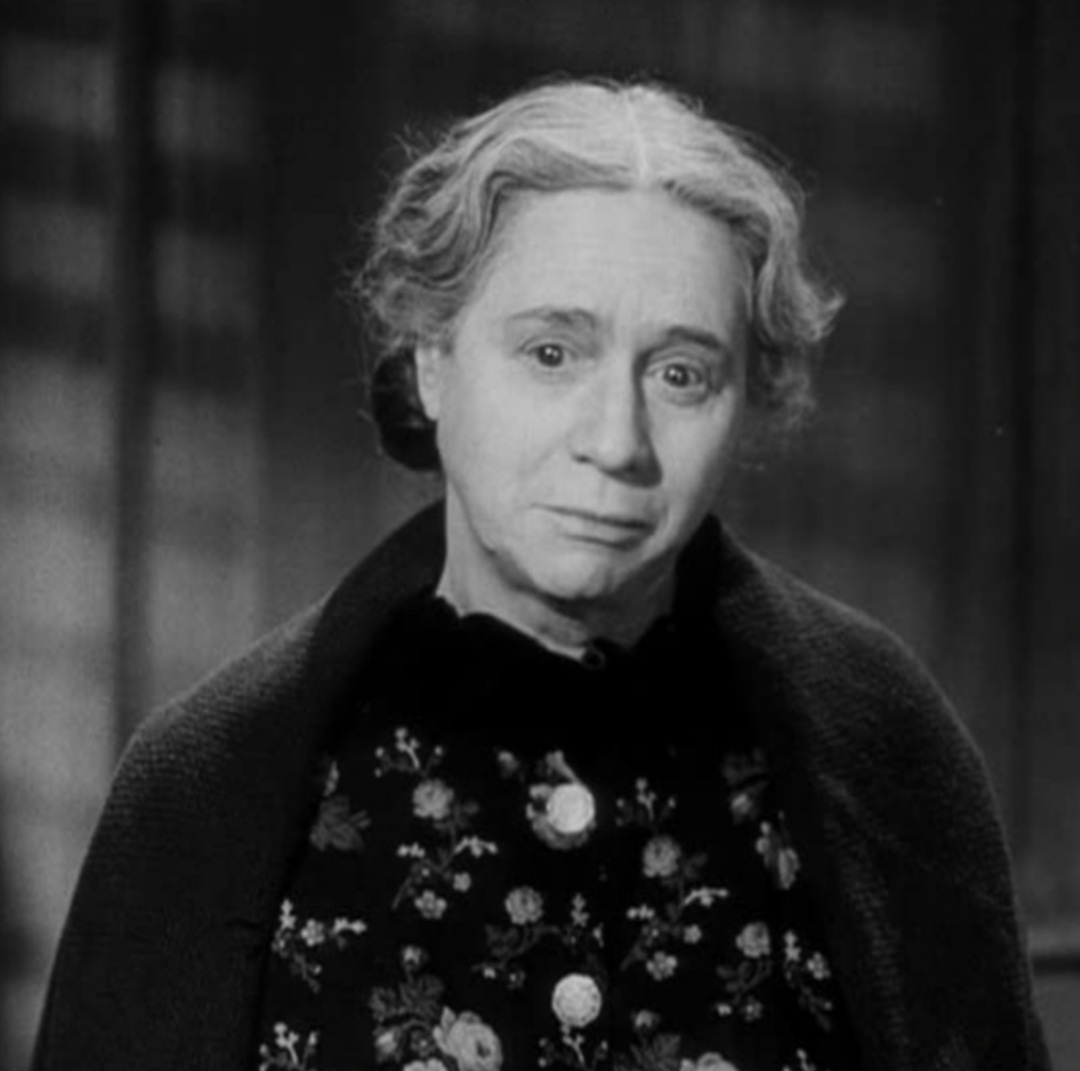
- Golm in The Hoodlum (1951)
- Born: Luise Schmertzler; 10 April 1891; Berlin, German Empire
- Died: 6 January 1964 (aged 72); Tel Aviv, Israel
- Resting place: Haifa Cemetery, Israel
- Occupation: Actress
- Years active: 1939–1962
- Spouse(s): Ernest Golm (m. 1918; died 1962)

Lisa Golm (née Luise Schmertzler, Hebrew: לואיז שמרצלר; 10 April 1891 – 6 January 1964) was a German actress who emigrated to America and appeared in a number of Hollywood films as a character actress. Golm made her first screen appearance in the 1939 film Confessions of a Nazi Spy. She also featured on American television, appearing on shows such as Alfred Hitchcock Presents, The Third Man and The Twilight Zone.

== Biography ==
On 6 November 1918, she married Ernest Otto Ferdinand Golm in Berlin, Germany and later entered the United States at New York City on 3 December 1937. She was naturalized as an American citizen on 24 September 1943, when a resident of Los Angeles.

== Death ==
Golm died on 6 January 1964, aged 72, in Tel Aviv, Israel. She was buried in the Haifa Cemetery in Israel. She was survived by her sister, Jennie Schmertzler.

== Selected filmography ==
- Confessions of a Nazi Spy (1939) as Mrs. Anna Westphal (uncredited)
- Escape (1940) as Anna
- So Ends Our Night (1941) as The Pale Woman, Ruth's roommate
- Journey for Margaret (1942) as Frau Weber
- Woman of the Year (1942) as Yugoslav Consul's Wife (uncredited)
- Calling Dr. Death (1943) as Marion's Mother
- Chetniks! The Fighting Guerrillas (1943) as Frau Spitz (uncredited)
- Mission to Moscow (1943) as Train Passenger Arriving Late (uncredited)
- Above Suspicion (1943) as Frau Schulz (uncredited)
- Madame Curie (1943) as Lucille (uncredited)
- The Seventh Cross (1944) as Frau Hinkel (uncredited)
- Shadow of a Woman (1946) as Emma
- Without Reservations (1946) as Alma (uncredited)
- High Wall (1947) as Dr. Golm (uncredited)
- Possessed (1947) as Elsie
- Cry Wolf (1947) as Mrs. Laidell (uncredited)
- A Foreign Affair (1948) as German (uncredited)
- Homecoming (1948) as Anna (uncredited)
- Little Women (1949) as Mrs. Hummel (uncredited)
- Anna Lucasta (1949) as Theresa
- The Great Sinner (1949) as Elderly Lady (uncredited)
- The Doctor and the Girl (1949) as Hetty
- The Great Gatsby (1949) as Pamela's Nurse (uncredited)
- East Side, West Side (1949) as Josephine
- The Happy Years (1950) as Connie's Maid (uncredited)
- The Hoodlum (1951) as Mrs. Lubeck
- Payment on Demand (1951) as Molly
- A Place in the Sun (1951) as Eastman's Maid (uncredited)
- The Blue Veil (1951) as Elsa (uncredited)
- Come Back, Little Sheba (1952) as Mrs. Coffman
- My Pal Gus (1952) as Anna
- Invitation (1952) as Agnes, the Maid
- The Merry Widow (1952) as Queen (uncredited)
- Bad for Each Other (1953) as Mrs. Marzano (uncredited)
- Ride the High Iron (1956) as Mrs. Danielchik
- Alfred Hitchcock Presents (1957) (Season 2 Episode 17: "My Brother, Richard") as Mrs. Kopeck
- Monkey on My Back (1957) as Barney's Mother
- The Twilight Zone (1960) (Season 2 Episode 2: "The Man in the Bottle") as Mrs. Gumley

== Bibliography ==
- Andreychuk, Ed. Burt Lancaster: A Filmography and Biography. McFarland, 2015.
- Capua, Michelangelo. Janet Leigh: A Biography. McFarland, 2013.
- Keaney, Michael F. Film Noir Guide: 745 Films of the Classic Era, 1940-1959. McFarland, 2003.
- McLaughlin, Robert. We'll Always Have the Movies: American Cinema during World War II. University Press of Kentucky, 2006.
