= That Other Woman =

1942 film by Ray McCarey

- Theatrical release poster
- Directed by: Ray McCarey
- Screenplay by: Jack Jungmeyer
- Produced by: Walter Morosco
- Starring: Virginia Gilmore; James Ellison; Dan Duryea; Janis Carter; Alma Kruger; Lon McCallister
- Cinematography: Joseph MacDonald
- Edited by: J. Watson Webb, Jr.
- Music by: Arthur Lange
- Production company: 20th Century Fox
- Distributed by: 20th Century Fox
- Release date: November 13, 1942
- Running time: 75 minutes
- Country: United States
- Language: English

That Other Woman is a 1942 American comedy film directed by Ray McCarey, written by Jack Jungmeyer, and starring Virginia Gilmore, James Ellison, Dan Duryea, Janis Carter, Alma Kruger and Lon McCallister. It was released on November 13, 1942, by 20th Century Fox.

== Cast ==
- Virginia Gilmore as Emily Borden
- James Ellison as Henry Summers
- Dan Duryea as Ralph Cobb
- Janis Carter as Constance Powell
- Alma Kruger as Grandma Borden
- Lon McCallister as George Borden
- Minerva Urecal as Mrs. MacReady
- Charles Arnt as Bailey
- Charles Halton as Smith
- Charles Trowbridge as Linkletter
- Frank Pershing as Lauderback
- George Melford as Zineschwich
- Paul Fix as Tough Guy
- Syd Saylor as Tramp
- Henry Roquemore as Clerk
- Leon Belasco as Walter
