= Montana Territory (film) =

1952 film by Ray Nazarro

- Directed by: Ray Nazarro
- Written by: Barry Shipman
- Produced by: Colbert Clark
- Starring: Lon McCallister; Wanda Hendrix; Preston Foster
- Cinematography: Henry Freulich
- Edited by: Paul Borofsky
- Color process: Technicolor
- Production company: Columbia Pictures
- Distributed by: Columbia Pictures
- Release date: June 1, 1952
- Running time: 64 minutes
- Country: United States
- Language: English

Montana Territory is a 1952 American Western film directed by Ray Nazarro and starring Lon McCallister, Wanda Hendrix and Preston Foster.

== Plot ==
Montana is on the brink of statehood but in need of law and order. John Malvin witnesses the murder of a miner and his son by Yeager, Ives and Gimp. He learns later that Ives is a deputy to the sheriff Henry Plummer, but Malvin does not know that Plummer is secretly plotting these and other recent murders. Malvin accepts a job as Plummer's deputy and falls in love with Clair Enoch, the daughter of Possum Enoch, who operates the stage relay depot.

Plummer asks Malvin to take Yeager's place guarding businessman Jason Waterman's stagecoach money shipment. Clair and Possum warn him that bandits will attack the stagecoach. Malvin is angered by suggestions that Plummer is the mastermind.

When the crimes continue, Clair organizes a vigilante group. Malvin remains against them until Plummer's attempt to kill Clair provides conclusive proof. He confronts and arrests Plummer.

== Cast ==
- Lon McCallister as John Malvin
- Wanda Hendrix as Clair Enoch
- Preston Foster as Sheriff Henry Plummer
- Hugh Sanders as Jason Waterman
- Jack Elam as Gimp
- Clayton Moore as Deputy George Ives
- Robert Griffin as Yeager
- Myron Healey as Bill Landers
- Eddy Waller as Possum Enoch

== Production ==
Production began on September 27, 1951.
