= Stage Door Canteen (film) =

1943 film by Frank Borzage

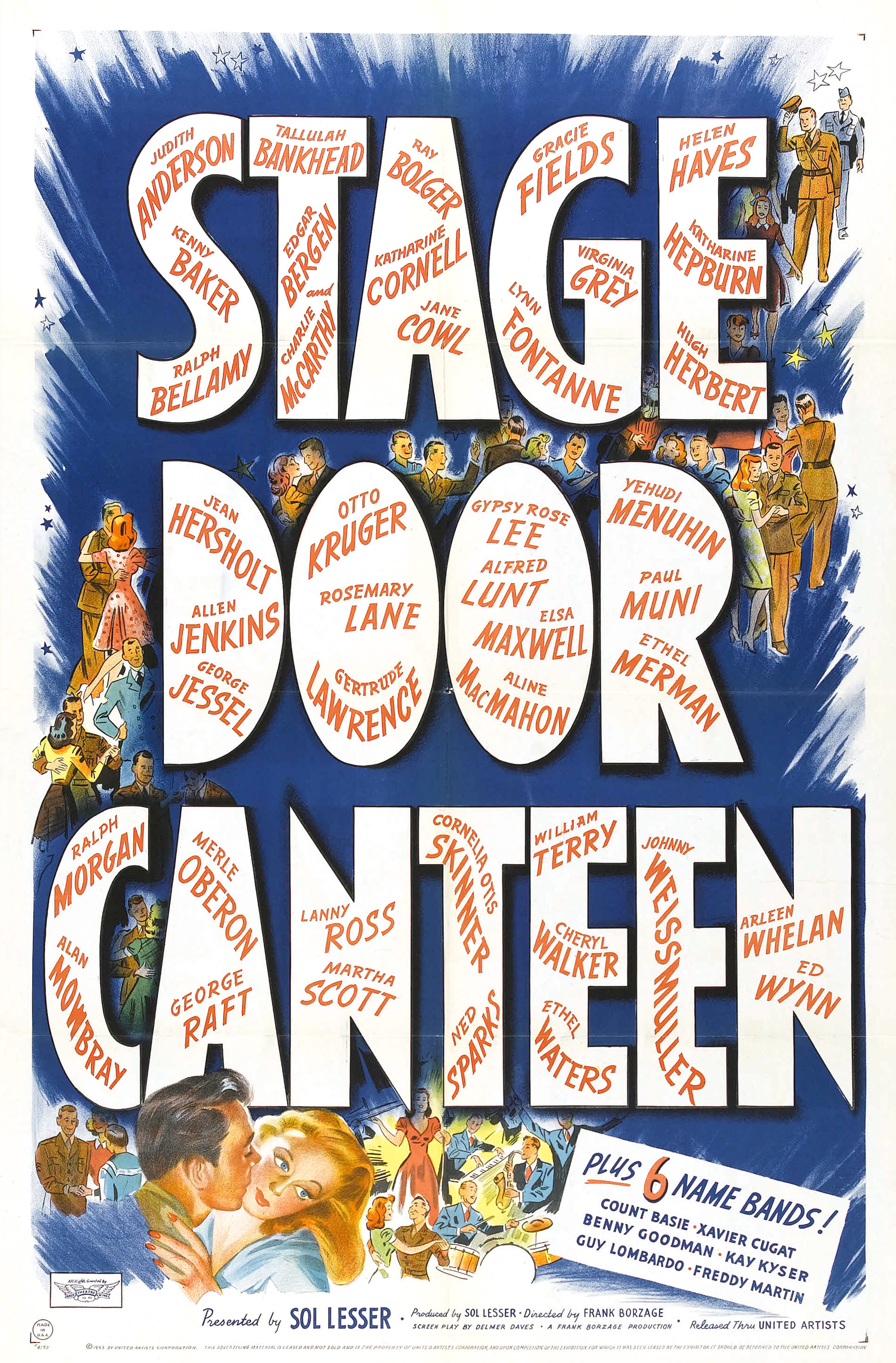
- Theatrical release poster
- Directed by: Frank Borzage
- Written by: Delmer Daves
- Produced by: Frank Borzage; Sol Lesser
- Starring: Judith Anderson; Kenny Baker; Ralph Bellamy; Tallulah Bankhead; Edgar Bergen; Charlie McCarthy; Ray Bolger; Katharine Cornell; Jane Cowl; Gracie Fields; Joan Fontaine; Virginia Grey; Helen Hayes; Katharine Hepburn; Hugh Herbert; Jean Hersholt; Allen Jenkins; George Jessel; Otto Kruger; Rosemary Lane; Gertrude Lawrence; Gypsy Rose Lee; Alfred Lunt; Elisa Maxwell; Aline MacMahon; Yehudi Menuhin; Paul Muni; Ethel Merman; Ralph Morgan; Alan Mowbray; Merle Oberon; George Raft; Lanny Ross; Martha Scott; Cornelia Otis Skinner; Ned Sparks; William Terry; Cheryl Walker; Ethel Waters; Johnny Weissmuller; Arleen Whelan; Ed Wynn; Count Basie; Xavier Cugat; Benny Goodman; Kay Kyser; Guy Lombardo; Freddy Martin
- Cinematography: Harry Wild
- Music by: Freddie Rich
- Production company: Principal Artists Productions
- Distributed by: United Artists
- Release date: May 12, 1943
- Running time: 132 minutes
- Country: United States
- Language: English
- Box office: $4.35 million (U.S. and Canada rentals)

Stage Door Canteen is a 1943 American World War II film with musical numbers and other entertainment interspersed with dramatic scenes by a largely unknown cast. The film was produced by Sol Lesser's Principal Artists Productions and directed by Frank Borzage. The film features many celebrity cameo appearances but primarily relates a simple drama set in the famed New York City restaurant and nightclub for American and Allied servicemen. Six bands are featured. The score and the original song, "We Mustn't Say Goodbye", were nominated for Academy Awards.

Stage Door Canteen is in the public domain in North America and for this reason is widely available in many DVD and VHS releases of varying quality.

== Plot ==
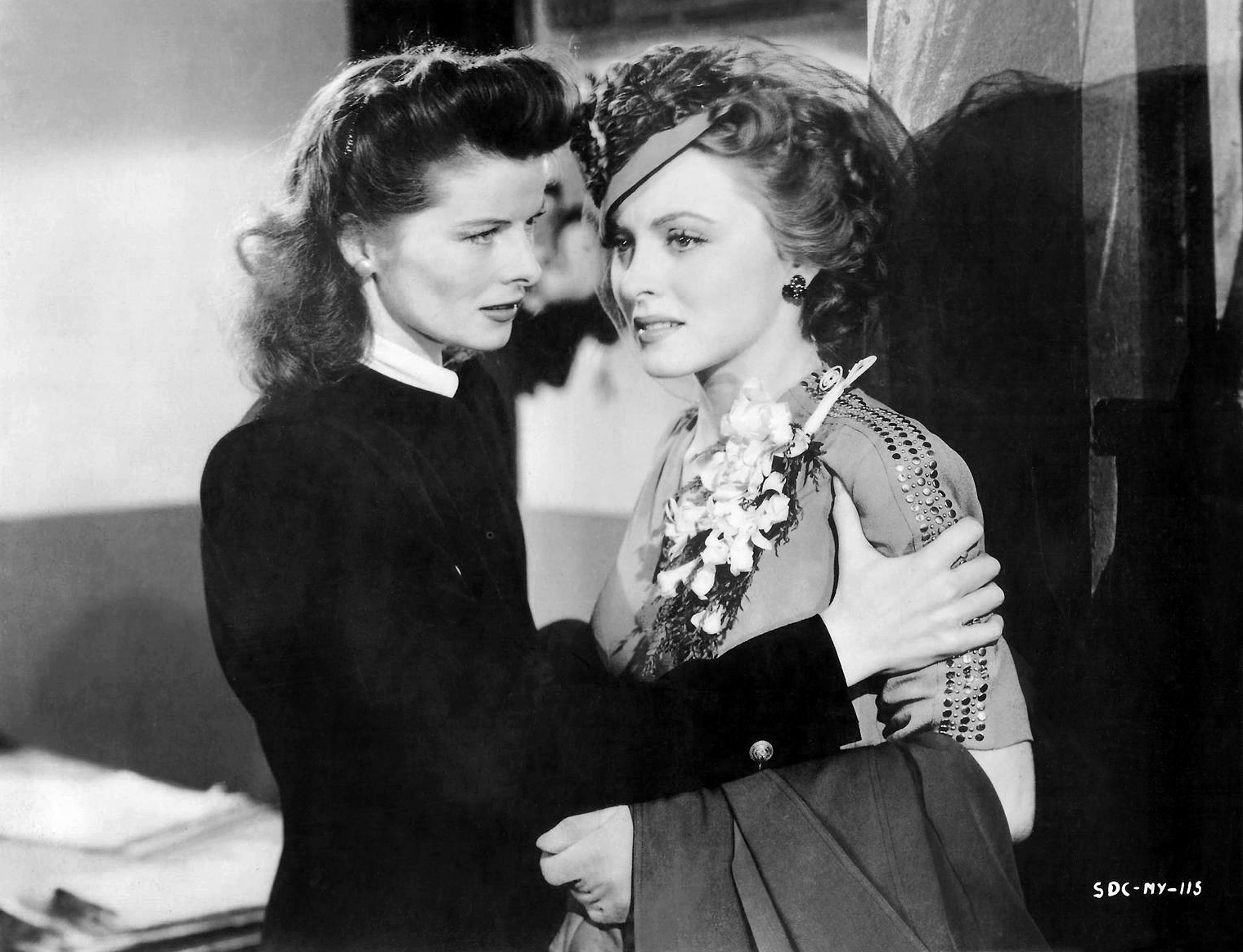
Katharine Hepburn and Cheryl Walker in Stage Door Canteen

The film, made in wartime, celebrates the work of the Stage Door Canteen, created in New York City as a recreational center for both American and Allied servicemen on leave to socialize with, be entertained or served by Broadway celebrities. The storyline follows several women who volunteer for the Canteen and must adhere to strict rules of conduct, the most important of which is that their job is to provide friendly companionship to and be dance partners for the (often nervous) men who are soon to be sent into combat. No romantic fraternization is allowed. Eileen is a volunteer who confesses to only becoming involved in the Canteen in order to be discovered by one of the Hollywood stars in attendance. She ultimately falls in love with and becomes engaged to one of the soldiers.

== Production ==
Stage Door Canteen was made under the auspices of the American Theatre Wing. The actual Stage Door Canteen in New York City was a basement club located in the 44th Street Theatre, and it could not be used for the filming as it was too busy receiving servicemen. The settings were recreated at the Fox Movietone Studio in New York and at RKO Pathé Studios in Los Angeles. Stage Door Canteen was in production from November 30, 1942, to late January 1943.

Star appearances range from momentary cameos, such as Johnny Weissmuller working in the Canteen's kitchen, to more substantial roles. In a June 1943 feature story titled "Show Business at War", Life magazine counted a total of 82 performers in Stage Door Canteen, and provided total screen time for some of them:

- Ray Bolger, dancing (391 seconds)
- Edgar Bergen with Charlie McCarthy (248 seconds) and Mortimer Snerd (102 seconds)
- Gypsy Rose Lee, performing a "strip" on stage (331 seconds)
- Gracie Fields, singing the "Machine Gun Song" and "The Lord's Prayer" (197 seconds)
- Katharine Cornell, serving food with Aline MacMahon and Dorothy Fields and reciting from Romeo and Juliet with Lon McCallister (113 seconds)
- Ed Wynn, various scenes (101 seconds)
- Katharine Hepburn, appears at the close with Selena Royle and in a scene with Cheryl Walker which was written by Robert Sherwood (99 seconds)
- Ethel Merman, singing "Marching Through Berlin" (95 seconds)
- Alfred Lunt and Lynn Fontanne working in the kitchen (81 seconds)
- Tallulah Bankhead, working as a senior hostess (50 seconds)
- Ina Claire, mediating a dispute between sailors who want to dance with her (43 seconds)
- Helen Hayes, working as a senior hostess (43 seconds)

Stage Door Canteen represents the only film appearance of Katharine Cornell. It features a performance of "Why Don't You Do Right?" by Benny Goodman and His Orchestra, which became the first major hit for singer Peggy Lee. Also featured are a tune by Count Basie and his band with Ethel Waters and two by violinist Yehudi Menuhin. African-American producer Leonard Harper was hired to do the African-American casting in New York City.

Of additional cultural note are two segments, one in which Merle Oberon sings the praises of America's Chinese allies, represented by Chinese airmen, and another in which Sam Jaffe interviews several Soviet officers, one of them female, in both English and Russian.

== Cast ==
=== Story cast ===
- Cheryl Walker as Eileen
- William Terry as Dakota
- Marjorie Riordan as Jean
- Lon McCallister as California
- Margaret Early as Ella Sue
- Michael Harrison as Tex
- Dorothea Kent as Mamie
- Fred Brady as Jersey
- Patrick O'Moore as The Australian
- Marian Shockley as Lillian
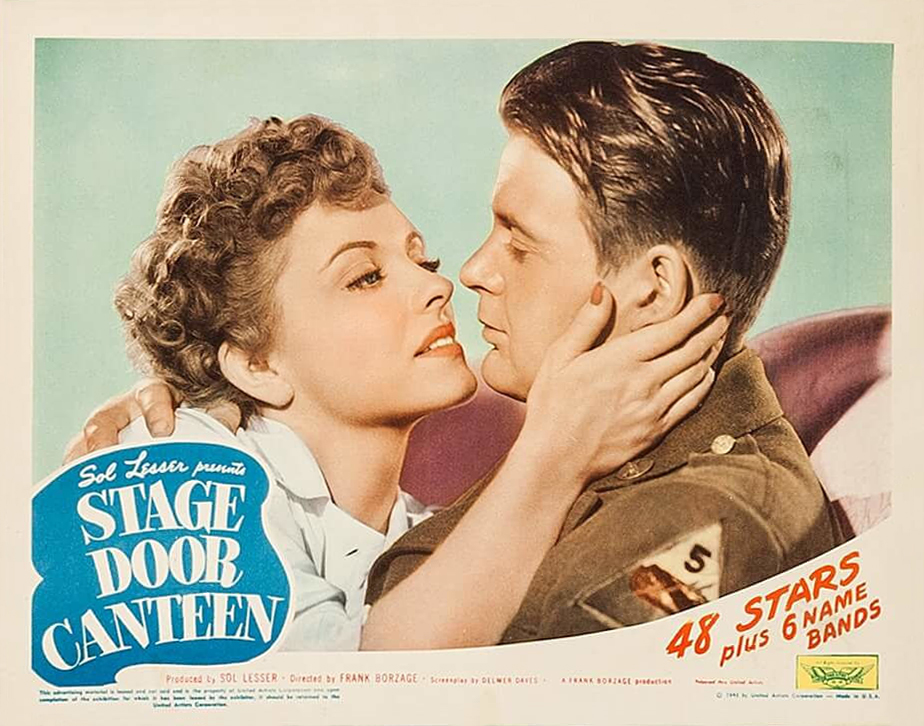
Cheryl Walker and William Terry

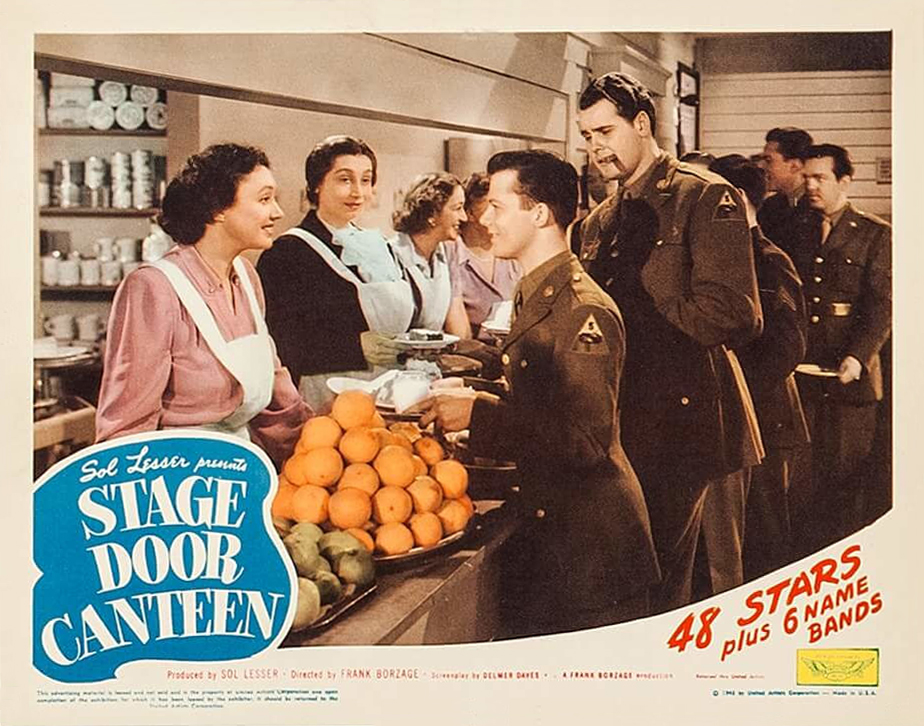
Lon McCallister and Michael Harrison are served by Katharine Cornell, Aline MacMahon and Dorothy Fields

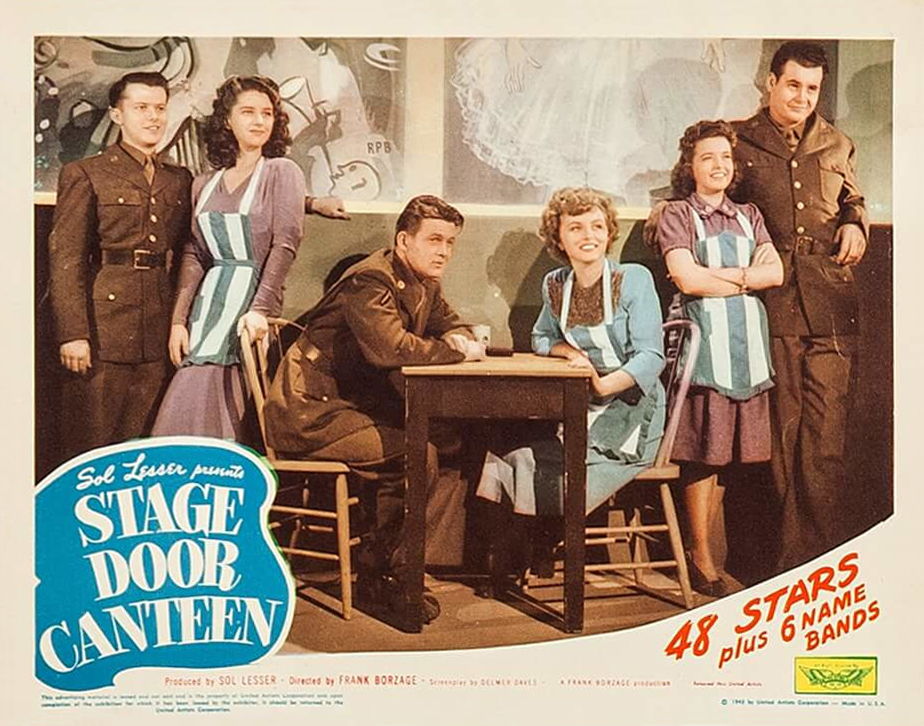
Lon McCallister, Marjorie Riordan, William Terry, Cheryl Walker, Margaret Early, Michael Harrison

=== Featured bands ===
- Count Basie with Ethel Waters
- Xavier Cugat with Lina Romay
- Benny Goodman with Peggy Lee
- Kay Kyser
- Guy Lombardo
- Freddy Martin
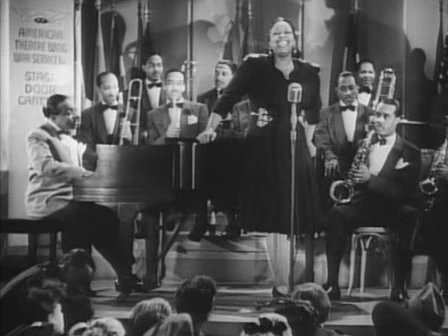
Count Basie with Ethel Waters

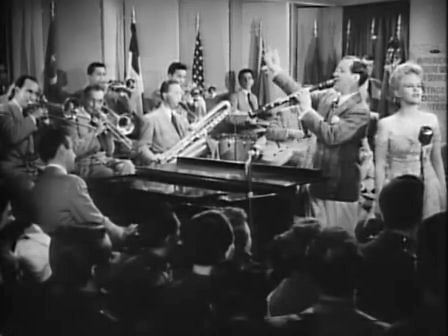
Benny Goodman with Peggy Lee

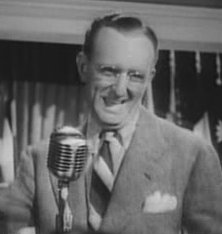
Kay Kyser

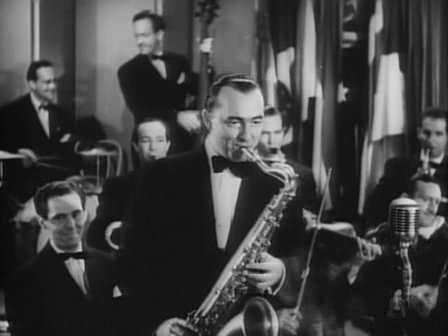
Freddy Martin

=== Featured cast ===
These featured cast members either perform or have extended dialogue in the story.

- Kenny Baker
- Edgar Bergen
- Ray Bolger
- Katharine Cornell
- Gracie Fields
- Helen Hayes
- Katharine Hepburn
- Sam Jaffe
- George Jessel
- Gypsy Rose Lee
- Yehudi Menuhin
- Ethel Merman
- Selena Royle
- Lanny Ross
- Ethel Waters
- Ed Wynn
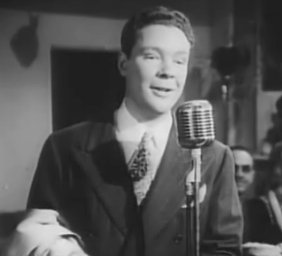
Kenny Baker

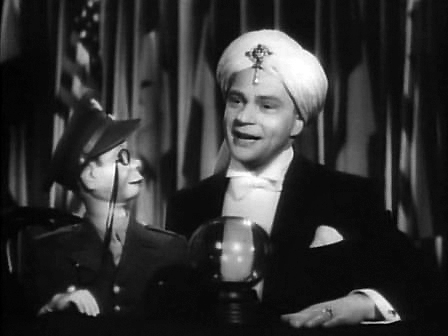
Edgar Bergen

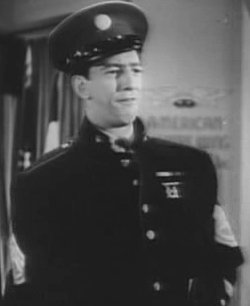
Ray Bolger

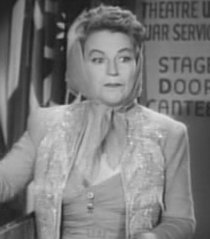
Gracie Fields

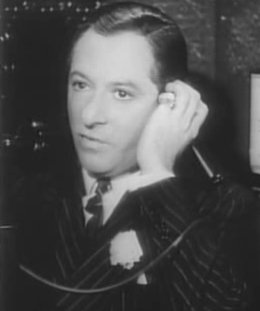
George Jessel

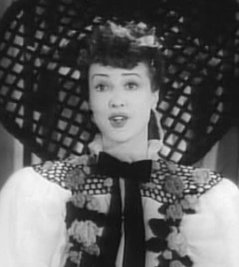
Gypsy Rose Lee

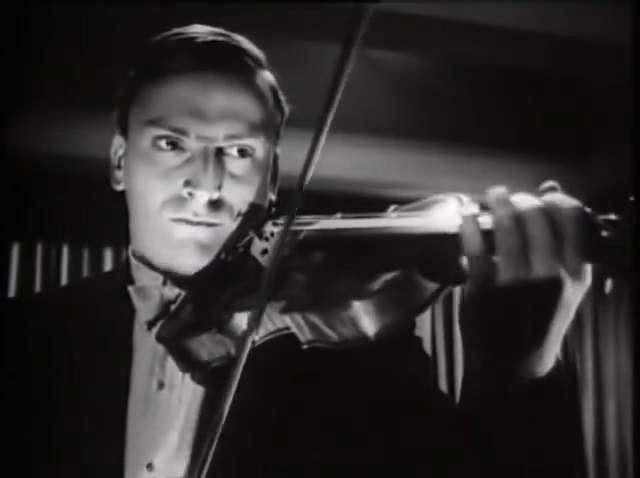
Yehudi Menuhin

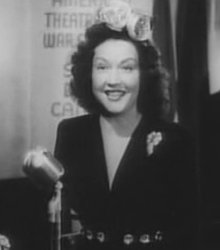
Ethel Merman

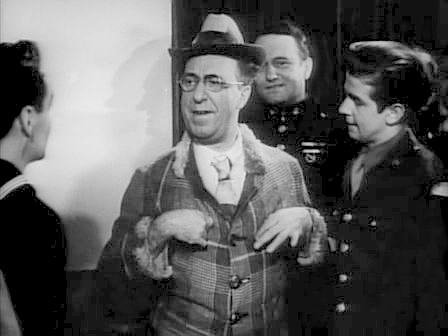
Ed Wynn

=== Cameo appearances ===
These featured players make brief appearances in the film.

- Judith Anderson
- Tallulah Bankhead
- Ralph Bellamy
- Ina Claire
- Lynn Fontanne
- Hugh Herbert
- Jean Hersholt
- Alfred Lunt
- Harpo Marx
- Elsa Maxwell
- Paul Muni
- Merle Oberon
- George Raft
- Martha Scott
- Johnny Weissmuller
- Vera Gordon

Other stage, screen and radio artists making cameo appearances include the following:

- Henry Armetta
- Helen Broderick
- Lloyd Corrigan
- Jane Darwell
- William Demarest
- Virginia Field
- Arlene Francis
- Vinton Freedley
- Ann Gillis
- Lucile Gleason
- Virginia Grey
- Allen Jenkins
- Roscoe Karns
- Tom Kennedy
- Otto Kruger
- June Lang
- Betty Lawford
- Bert Lytell
- Aline MacMahon
- Horace McMahon
- Helen Menken
- Peggy Moran
- Alan Mowbray
- Elliott Nugent
- Franklin Pangborn
- Helen Parrish
- Brock Pemberton
- Cornelia Otis Skinner
- Ned Sparks
- Bill Stern
- Arleen Whelan
- Dame May Whitty
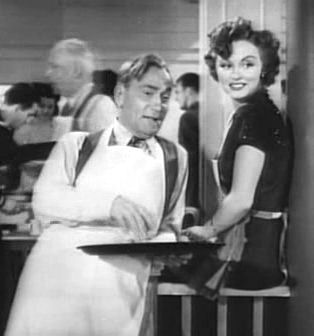
William Demarest

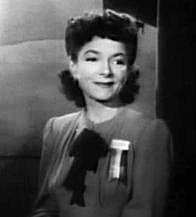
Helen Hayes

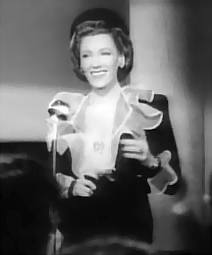
Helen Menken

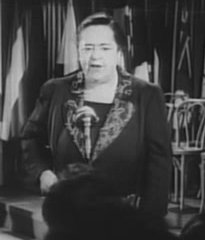
Elsa Maxwell

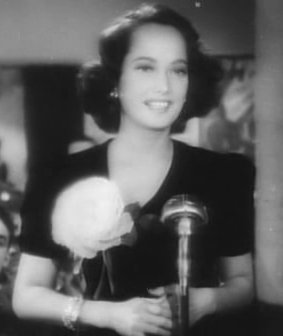
Merle Oberon

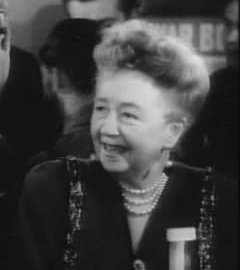
May Whitty

== Music ==
- "Flight of the Bumblebee"
- "A Rookie and His Rhythm"
- "She's a Bombshell from Brooklyn"
- "We Mustn't Say Goodbye"
- "Sleep Baby Sleep (in Your Jeep)"
- "Don't Worry Island"
- "You're Pretty Terrific Yourself"
- "Quicksand"
- "The Girl I Love to Leave Behind"
- "The Machine Gun Song"
- "The Lord's Prayer"
- "Good Night, Sweetheart"
- "Marching Through Berlin"
- "Rhumba-Rhumba"
- "Why Don't You Do Right?"
- "Bugle Call Rag" play by Benny Goodman band
- Schubert's "Ave Maria", played by violinist Yehudi Menuhin
- "Marines' Hymn"

== Release ==
Distributed by United Artists, Stage Door Canteen premiered on May 12, 1943, with a run time of 132 minutes. Some modern prints have been trimmed to 93 minutes.

== Reception ==
Stage Door Canteen was named one of the ten best motion pictures of 1943 in a Film Daily poll of 439 newspaper and radio reviewers.

The film received two Academy Award nominations—for the original score by Fred Rich, and for the original song, "We Mustn't Say Goodbye", by James V. Monaco (music) and Al Dubin (lyrics).

Bosley Crowther, film critic for The New York Times, prefaced his remarks on the film by stating his aversion to the contemporary trend toward all-star spectacles, which he called "cheap showmanship":

But for once, we've got to make a frank concession. As done in Stage Door Canteen this parading of show-world notables has some real dramatic point. It shapes a glamorous, atmospheric setting within which a slight story is played—a setting as real as is the Canteen for a story that is old as the hills. … And, besides, some of the acts are pretty good.

Crowther praised producer Sol Lesser for creating an illusion of authenticity by casting newcomers to the screen—"anybody's boys and girls … just so many nice kids at the Canteen." He credited the film for catching the generous spirit of show people wishing to do their part to help win the war. "As a general rule," he concluded, "this writer is depressed by a bandwagon of stars. But this is one time when the spectacle really brings a lump of pride to the throat." In The Nation in 1943, critic James Agee wrote, "Stage Door Canteen is beautiful as a preview of a period piece. Any film is, but this one carries a saturation of the mannerism of fourth-decade entertainment, patriotism, and sub-idealized lovemaking which could supply almost any twenty others. The best of the patriotism is implicit rather than overt. The lovemaking is strictly church-supper. The entertainment is best. "

All proceeds, after Lesser's 8.5 percent, were donated to the American Theatre Wing and its allied charities. The film was such a success at the boxoffice that Lesser was able to turn over $1.5 million—the equivalent of more than $20.5 million today.

"Patriotism, entertainment, and romance mix badly", wrote modern critic Pauline Kael, who looked back on the film for The New Yorker. "Many famous performers make fools of themselves … Katharine Cornell, Katharine Hepburn, and Paul Muni fare a shade worse than most of the other 50-odd famous performers; Ray Bolger and Ed Wynn come off rather better." Kael termed the film "depressing" and particularly criticized Delmer Daves's "horribly elaborate narrative". Dave Kehr of The New York Times called the film "an interesting document on World War II".

== See also ==
- 44th Street Theatre
- Hollywood Canteen
- Thank Your Lucky Stars
- Cowboy Canteen
- Show Business at War
