= Navy Nurse =

1945 film by D. Ross Lederman

Navy Nurse is a 1945 American short film directed by D. Ross Lederman and starring Warren Douglas, Andrea King, and Marjorie Riordan.
