= The Hoodlum (1951 film) =

1951 film by Max Nosseck

- Theatrical release poster
- Directed by: Max Nosseck
- Written by: Sam Neuman; Nat Tanchuck
- Produced by: Maurice Kosloff
- Starring: Lawrence Tierney; Allene Roberts; Marjorie Riordan
- Cinematography: Clark Ramsey
- Edited by: Jack Killifer
- Music by: Darrell Calker
- Production company: Jack Schwarz Productions
- Distributed by: Eagle-Lion
- Release date: July 5, 1951 (New York)
- Running time: 61 minutes
- Country: United States
- Language: English

The Hoodlum is a 1951 American crime film noir directed by Max Nosseck and starring Lawrence Tierney, Allene Roberts, Marjorie Riordan and Edward Tierney.

== Plot ==
Vincent Lubeck is a habitual criminal who has recently been released from prison on parole thanks to the pleas of his elderly mother. He begins working at his brother Johnny's gas station, although there is tension between them. Johnny's fiancée Rosa hopes to help reform Vincent, but she cannot resist his determined advances. He soon seduces her, in part to show her that it is difficult to be good in an irredeemably bad world.

Vincent becomes interested in the armored car that makes regular stops at the bank across the street. He romances Eileen, a beautiful independent-minded secretary at the bank who knows the intimate details of the bank's operations, and begins pumping her for information. Although she finds him fascinating, she proves to be much tougher than Rosa. Vincent begins to plan a bank robbery, recruiting men whom he knows from prison as his accomplices. He had once shared a cell with a master bank robber and listened carefully when the man spoke about planning bank heists.

Rosa approaches Vincent, who has lost interest in her, begging him to marry her. When he refuses, she jumps from the roof to her death. Vincent's mother learns that the autopsy reveals that Rosa was pregnant.

Vincent devises a plan involving a fake funeral procession, allowing the gang to pass through a police blockade. The robbery leaves several dead bank guards but yields the thieves a great sum of cash. With the money in hand, his spiteful accomplices deny him a larger share as the planner of the heist, and the men depart with equal shares of the loot. Vincent becomes the only surviving member of the gang, and an all-points bulletin is issued for his arrest.

In desperation and without resources, Vincent appeals to Eileen, but she produces a handgun and orders him to leave, fearing that he will implicate her. His mother, on her deathbed and now regretting her intervention on his behalf, curses Vincent. Johnny, now knowing what happened to Rosa, takes him at gunpoint to a local dump but cannot kill his own brother. The police, who followed them there undetected, shoot Vincent dead.

== Cast ==
- Lawrence Tierney as Vincent Lubeck
- Allene Roberts as Rosa
- Marjorie Riordan as Eileen
- Lisa Golm as Mrs. Lubeck
- Edward Tierney as Johnny Lubeck
- Stuart Randall as police Lt. Burdick
- Angela Stevens as Christie Lang
- John De Simone as Marty Connell
- Tom Hubbard as police Sgt. Schmidt
- Eddie Foster as Mickey Sessions
- O.Z. Whitehead as Mr. Breckenridge
- Richard Barron as Eddie Bright
- Rudy Rama as Harry Hill

== Reception ==
In a contemporary review for The New York Times, critic Howard Thompson called the film "another cheap, gaudy sermon about crime not paying off" and wrote: "Anyone who takes a. good look at the ... marquee before purchasing a ticket to see Lawrence Tierney in 'The Hoodlum' will have no excuse for demanding his money back. The marquee tells the whole story, the same kind of story, in fact, that the shark-mouthed Mr. Tierney has been snarling his way through since his screen debut as John Dillinger."

In The Philadelphia Inquirer, critic Marion Kelley wrote: "Whether or not gangster pictures serve a purpose is a moot question, but Hollywood script writers keep turning them out with appalling regularity. A new one cut from old cloth is 'The Hoodlum,' ... a sordid tale that proved little except the truth of the maxim 'The devil a monk would be.'"

== See also ==
- List of films in the public domain in the United States
