= Lon McCallister =

American actor (1923–2005)

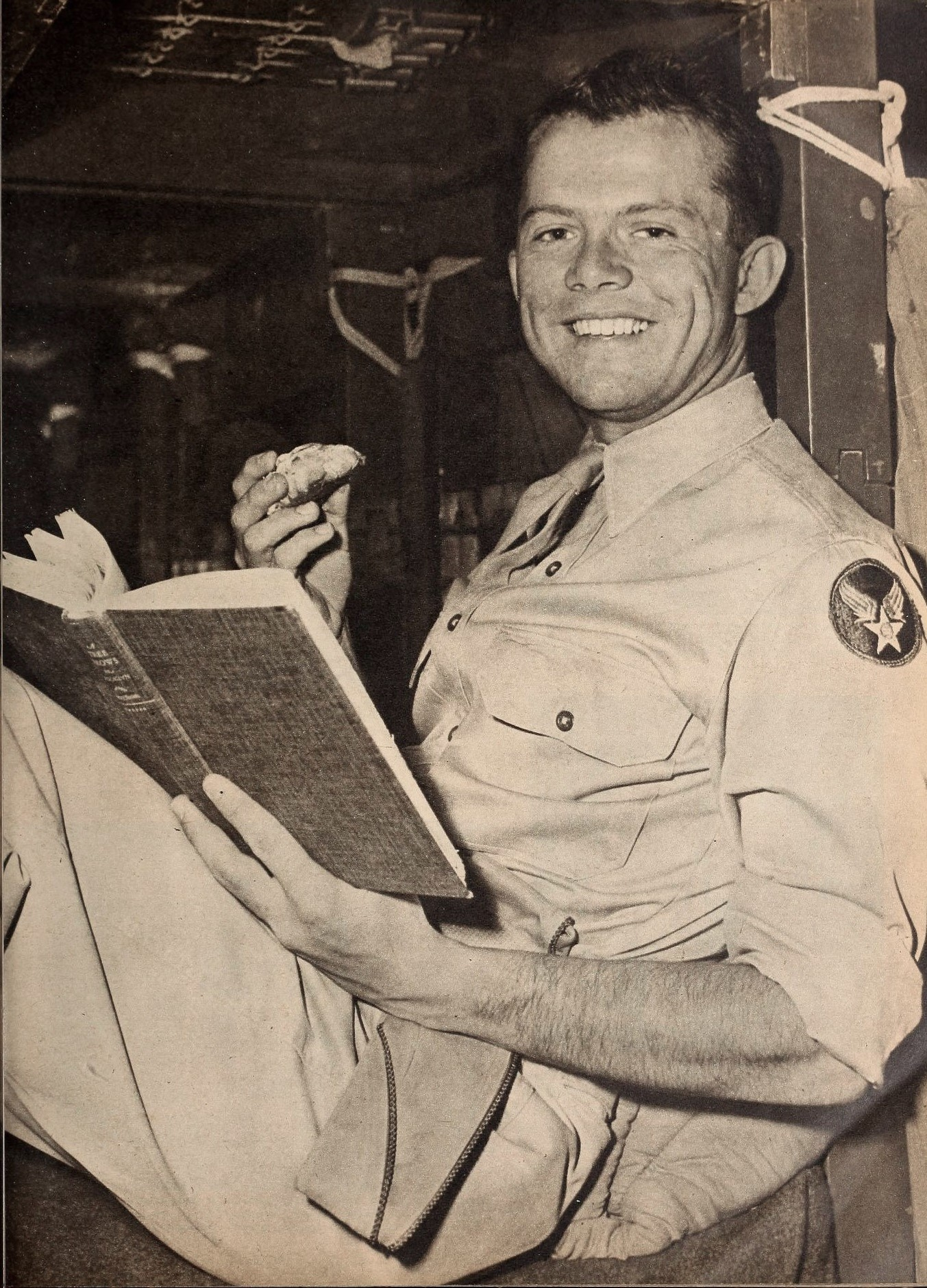
- McCallister in 1945
- Born: Herbert Alonzo McCallister, Jr. April 17, 1923; Los Angeles, California, U.S.
- Died: June 11, 2005 (aged 82); South Lake Tahoe, California, U.S.
- Occupation: Actor
- Years active: 1936–1963
- Partner: William Eythe

Herbert Alonzo "Lon" McCallister Jr. (April 17, 1923 – June 11, 2005) was an American actor. According to one obituary, he was best known for "playing gentle, boyish young men from the country." Another said he "had an ingenuous appeal that made him a favourite of family audiences, and was particularly at home in outdoor settings featuring dogs and horses. Ultimately his perennial boyishness and slight stature became a handicap for more mature roles."

== Early life ==
Born in Los Angeles, Lon McCallister was the son of a real estate broker. He attended Marken Professional School, which trained children for show-business careers and began appearing in movies at the age of 13. He had uncredited appearances in Let's Sing Again (1936) and Romeo and Juliet (1936), directed by George Cukor who, gave McAllister a large close up, and became a friend.

== Career ==
He was uncredited in Stella Dallas (1937), Souls at Sea (1937), Make a Wish (1937), The Adventures of Tom Sawyer (1938), Judge Hardy's Children (1938), Lord Jeff (1938), That Certain Age (1938), Little Tough Guys in Society (1939), The Spirit of Culver (1939), Confessions of a Nazi Spy (1939), Babes in Arms (1939), First Love (1939), and Joe and Ethel Turp Call on the President (1939).

McCallister could also be glimpsed in Susan and God (1940), Henry Aldrich for President (1941), Dangerously They Live (1941), Always in My Heart (1942), Yankee Doodle Dandy (1942), Spy Ship (1942), Night in New Orleans (1942), That Other Woman (1942), Gentleman Jim (1942), Quiet Please: Murder (1942), Over My Dead Body (1942), The Hard Way (1943), and The Meanest Man in the World (1943). Columnist Hedda Hopper called him "the cutest boy the movies have hauled up out of obscurity since Mickey Rooney."

=== Stardom ===
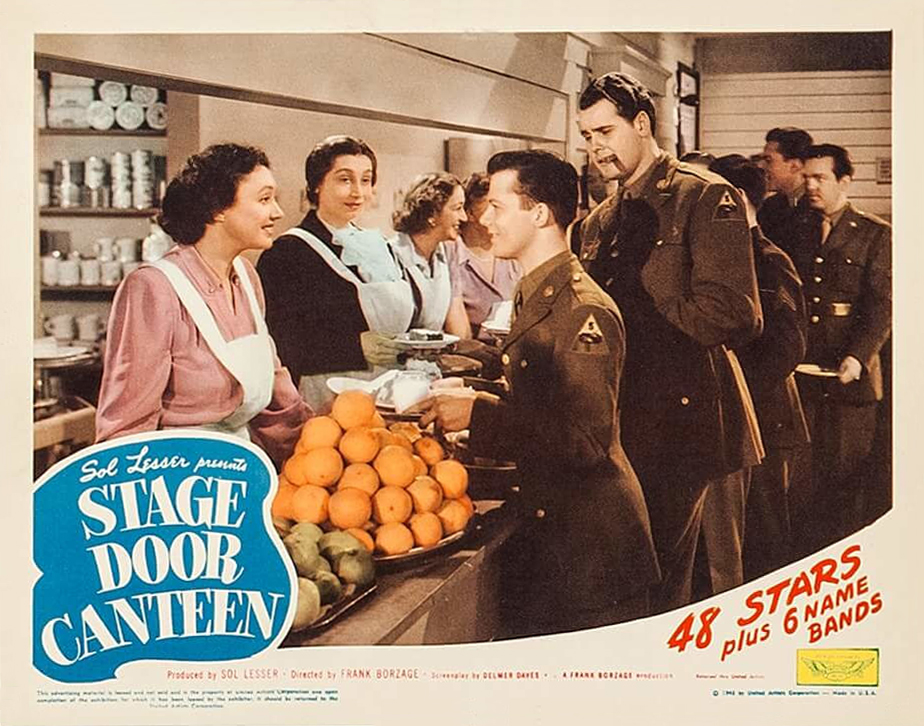
Lon McCallister (center) with Michael Harrison and Katharine Cornell in Stage Door Canteen (1943)

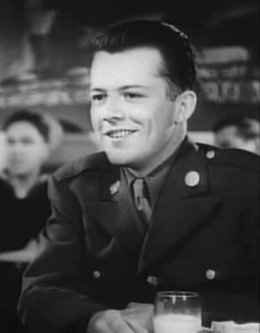
From the film Stage Door Canteen (1943)

At 20, he appeared in the World War II morale booster Stage Door Canteen, where he played a star struck serviceman with theater actress and producer Katharine Cornell. The Los Angeles Times said he stole the film with "his bashful smile and winning ways".

McCallister leapt to fame playing the lead as Sparke in the horse-racing tale Home in Indiana (1944), also starring Walter Brennan and Jeanne Crain. This led to a contract with 20th Century Fox. He followed it with Winged Victory (1944) but then his career momentum was interrupted by war service.

Growing only to 5'6" he found it difficult to find roles as an adult. He appeared with Edward G. Robinson in 1947's The Red House and had the star role in Thunder in the Valley (1947), and supported June Haver in Scudda Hoo! Scudda Hay! (1948).

McCallister had the lead in another animal story The Big Cat (1949) and co-starred with Shirley Temple in The Story of Seabiscuit (1949). He was in The Boy from Indiana (1950).

=== Television ===
McCallister began appearing on TV in episodes of Suspense ("Lunch Box", "Collector's Item"), and Lux Video Theatre ("Down Bayou DuBac").

He had the lead in Sam Katzman's A Yank in Korea (1951) and a Western, Montana Territory (1952). However he was mostly seen in TV: Tales of Tomorrow ("Verdict from Space"), "The Last Man on Earth", ("Enemy Unknown"), The Ford Television Theatre ("My Daughter's Husband"), Schlitz Playhouse ("Operation Riviera"), and Footlights Theater ("My Daughter's Husband"). His last feature film was Combat Squad (1953).

McCallister and William Eythe were producers of the stage musical revue Lend an Ear, which began at Los Angeles' Las Palmas Theater and launched Carol Channing's career.

=== Post-acting career ===
In 1953, at the age of 30, McCallister retired from acting. Later, he became a successful real estate manager, wealthy from his investments.

After retirement, he still appeared in two television series, as Coley Wilks in the 1961 episode "The Hostage" of the ABC western series, The Rebel, starring Nick Adams; and as Willie in the 1963 episode "Triple Indemnity" of the CBS sitcom, The New Phil Silvers Show. In 1963 he said, "I'm happy. I'm doing what I want".

In a 1992 interview, McCallister said, "Being a movie star was great, but I never considered doing it for a lifetime. I wanted to be myself, to go where I pleased without causing a traffic jam. I've succeeded in this, and I'm happy".

== Personal life ==
McCallister was a long time romantic partner of fellow actor William Eythe, up until Eythe's death in 1957. He died from congestive heart failure at the age of 82.

== Filmography ==
Year	Title	Role	Notes
1936	Let's Sing Again	Orphan	Uncredited
1936	Romeo and Juliet	Minor Role	Uncredited
1937	Stella Dallas	Boy	Uncredited
1937	Souls at Sea	Cabin Boy	Uncredited
1937	Make a Wish	Summer Camp Kid	Uncredited
1938	The Adventures of Tom Sawyer	Schoolboy	Uncredited
1938	Judge Hardy's Children		Uncredited
1938	Lord Jeff		Uncredited
1938	That Certain Age	Billy	Uncredited
1938	Little Tough Guys in Society		Uncredited
1939	The Spirit of Culver	Cadet	Uncredited
1939	Confessions of a Nazi Spy		Uncredited
1939	Babes in Arms	Boy	Uncredited
1939	First Love	Boy at School	Uncredited
1939	Joe and Ethel Turp Call on the President	Johnny	Uncredited
1940	Susan and God	Party Guest	Uncredited
1941	Henry Aldrich for President	Student	Uncredited
1941	Dangerously They Live	Newsboy	Uncredited
1942	Always in My Heart	Boy	Uncredited
1942	Yankee Doodle Dandy	Call Boy	Uncredited
1942	Spy Ship	Telegram Messenger Boy	Uncredited
1942	Night in New Orleans	Boy in Car	Uncredited
1942	That Other Woman	George Borden	
1942	Gentleman Jim	Page Boy	Uncredited
1942	Quiet Please, Murder	Freddie, the Stack Boy	Uncredited
1942	Over My Dead Body	Jimmie	
1943	The Hard Way	Bud – Call Boy in Montage	Uncredited
1943	The Meanest Man in the World	Bellboy	Uncredited
1943	Stage Door Canteen	California Jack Gilman	
1944	Home in Indiana	'Sparke' Thornton	
1944	Winged Victory	Francis William 'Frankie' Davis	
1947	The Red House	Nath Storm	
1947	Thunder in the Valley	David MacAdam	
1948	Scudda Hoo! Scudda Hay!	Daniel 'Snug' Dominy	
1949	The Big Cat	Danny Turner	
1949	The Story of Seabiscuit	Ted Knowles	
1950	The Boy from Indiana	Lon Decker	
1951	A Yank in Korea	Andy Smith	
1952	Montana Territory	John Malvin	
1953	Combat Squad	Martin	
