= Cheryl Walker (actress) =

American model and actress (1918–1971)

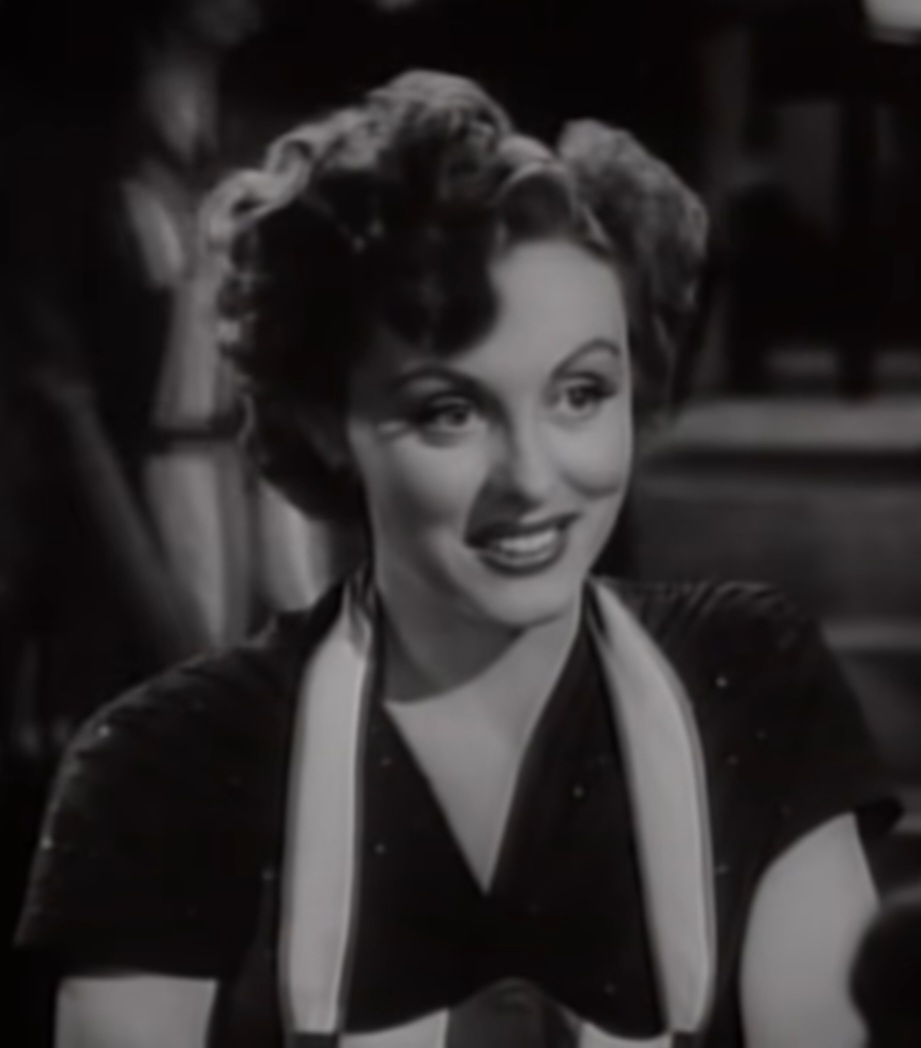
- Walker in Stage Door Canteen (1943)
- Born: August 1, 1918; South Pasadena, California, U.S.
- Died: October 24, 1971 (aged 53); Pasadena, California, U.S.
- Resting place: San Gabriel Cemetery, Los Angeles County, California
- Occupations: Actress, model
- Years active: 1938–1948
- Spouse(s): Dr. Jay Etzell Coumbe (1940-?) (divorced) (1 child); Tway W. Andrews (?-1971) (her death)
- Children: 5

Cheryl Walker (August 1, 1918 – October 24, 1971) was an American fashion model and actress.

== Early years ==
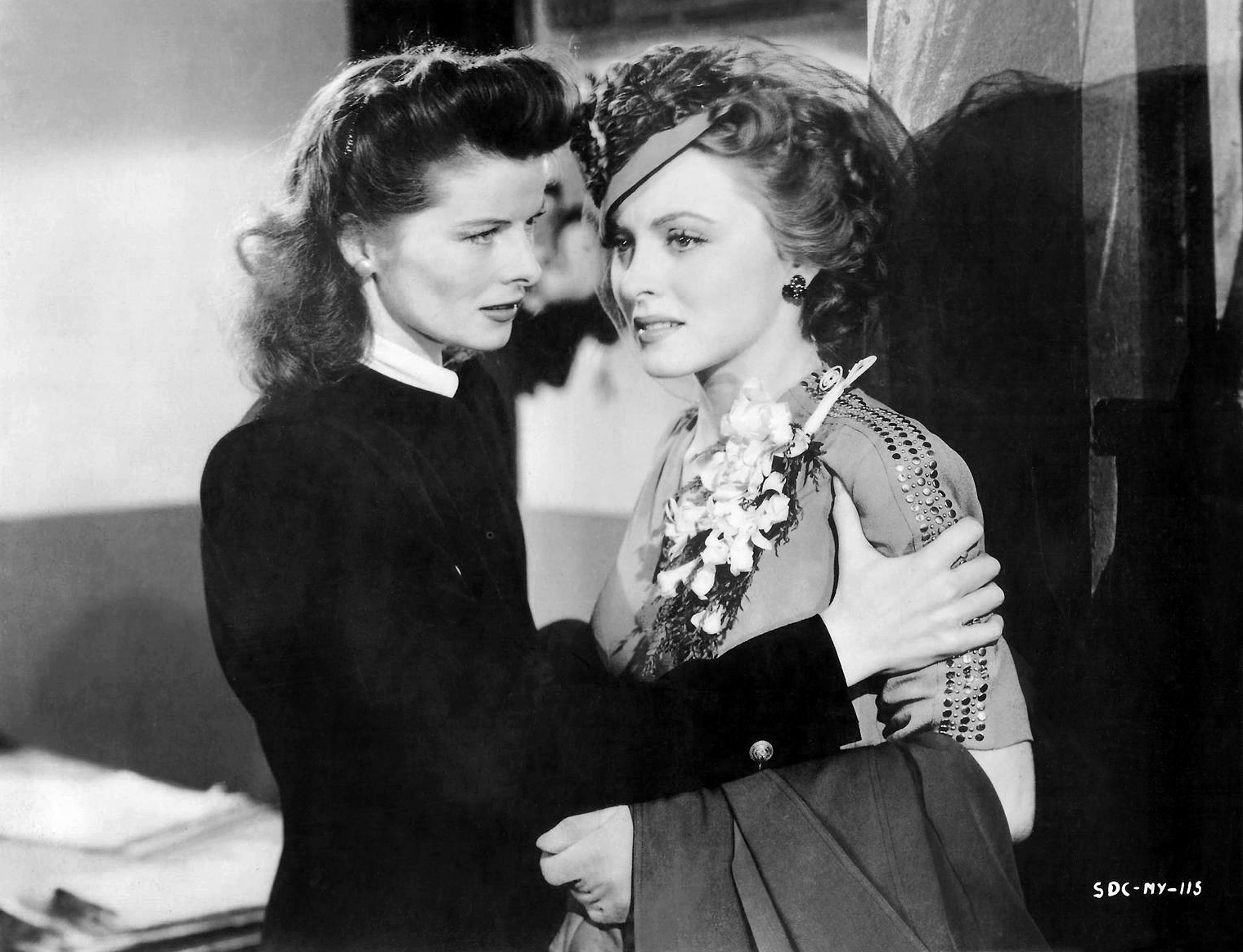
Katharine Hepburn and Cheryl Walker in Stage Door Canteen (1943)

Walker was born in South Pasadena, California, to Everett Dale and Pauline S. Walker. She attended Pasadena Junior College, where she was a champion swimmer. Walker won the 1938 Tournament of Roses pageant leading to a film contract.

== Career ==
On January 4, 1938, Walker signed a contract with Paramount Pictures. She appeared in small, uncredited roles in several films from 1938 until her first substantial role in Chasing Trouble (1940) with Frankie Darro. She briefly took the name Sharon Lee for the film Secrets of a Model (1940), which provided her first starring role, before returning to minor roles. She was Veronica Lake's double in the film Sullivan's Travels (1941), and was the female lead in Shadows on the Sage (1942). She also was Claudette Colbert's stand-in on No Time for Love. Her most substantial role was in Stage Door Canteen (1943) in which she played a hostess at the canteen who meets and falls in love with a serviceman. She continued appearing in films until her retirement in 1948.

== Later years ==
In the late 1950s, Walker traveled throughout Southern California giving speeches to civic and church groups on "the menace of communism". She belonged to the San Marino Republican Women's Club and co-founded and was president of the Tuesday Morning Study Club which presented annual patriotism awards to anti-communist activists such as George Putnam, Baxter Ward, Matt Cvetic, Chief William Parker, Congressman Donald Jackson, and Jenkin Lloyd Jones.

== Personal life ==
On December 16, 1940, Walker married Dr. Jay Etzell Coumbe in South Pasadena; they had one daughter. They separated on January 20, 1959, and she sued for divorce in June 1960. They later divorced. She married, secondly, to Tway W. Andrews, who survived her.

== Death ==
Walker died of cancer at Huntington Memorial Hospital in Pasadena. She was buried in San Gabriel Cemetery, Los Angeles County, California.
