= Tyrone Power filmography =

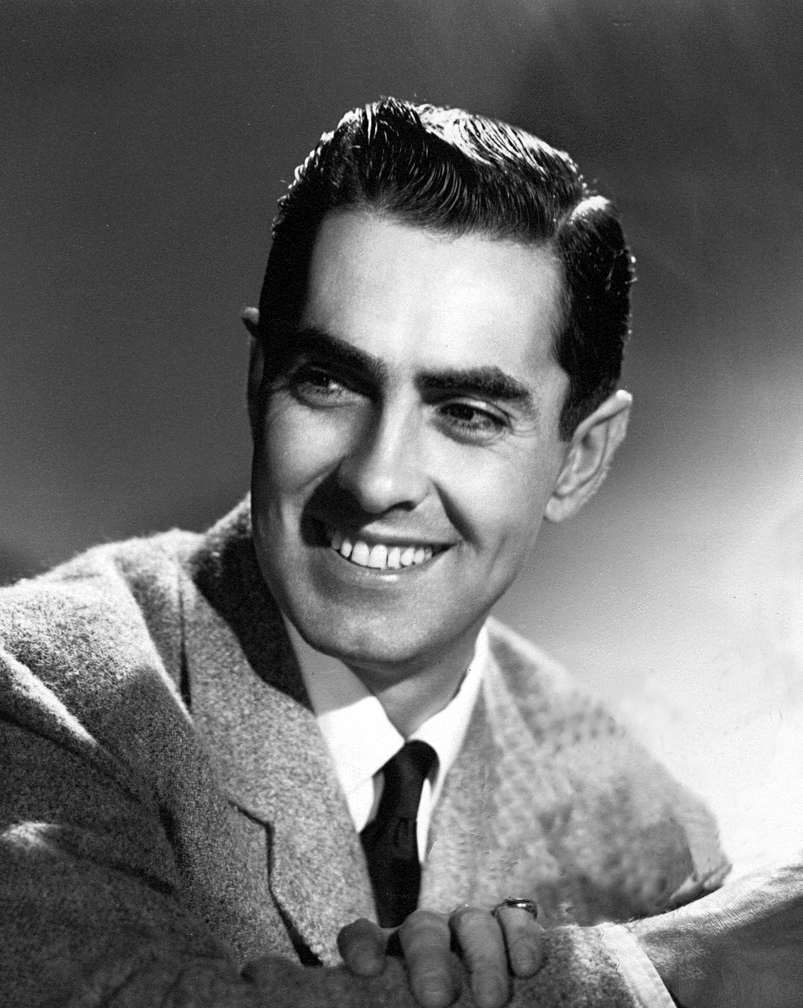
Publicity photo in the early 1940s

Tyrone Power (May 5, 1914 – November 15, 1958) appeared in a total of 48 feature-length motion pictures.

== Film ==
Year	Title	Role	Director	Notes
1932	Tom Brown of Culver	John	William Wyler	Billed as Tyrone Power Jr.
1934	Flirtation Walk	Cadet	Frank Borzage	Uncredited
1936	Girls' Dormitory	Count Vallais	Irving Cummings	Billed as Tyrone Power Jr.
1936	Ladies in Love	Count Karl Lanyi	Edwin H. Griffith	Billed as Tyrone Power Jr.
1936	Lloyd's of London	Jonathan Blake	Henry King	
1937	Love Is News	Steve Layton	Tay Garnett	Remade as That Wonderful Urge (1948).
1937	Café Metropole	Alexis	Edwin H. Griffith	
1937	Thin Ice	Prince Rudolph	Sidney Lansfield	Aka Lovely to Look At (UK).
1937	Second Honeymoon	Raoul McLish	Walter Lang	
1938	In Old Chicago	Dion O'Leary	Henry King	
1938	Alexander's Ragtime Band	Roger "Alexander" Grant	Henry King	
1938	Marie Antoinette	Count Axel de Fersen	W.S. Van Dyke	Originally released in sepiatone.
1938	Suez	Ferdinand de Lesseps	Allan Dwan	Originally released in sepiatone.
1939	Jesse James	Jesse James	Henry King	Filmed in Technicolor.
1939	Rose of Washington Square	Barton DeWitt Clinton	Gregory Ratoff	
1939	Second Fiddle	Jimmy Sutton	Sidney Lansfield	Aka Irving Berlin's Second Fiddle.
1939	The Rains Came	Dr. Major Rama Safti	Clarence Brown	Originally released in sepiatone.
1939	Day-Time Wife	Ken Norton	Gregory Ratoff	
1940	Johnny Apollo	Bob Cain (Johnny Apollo)	Henry Hathaway	
1940	Brigham Young	Jonathan Kent	Henry Hathaway	Aka Brigham Young – Frontiersman. Originally released in sepiatone.
1940	The Mark of Zorro	Don Diego Vega / Zorro	Rouben Mamoulian	
1941	Blood and Sand	Juan Gallardo	Rouben Mamoulian	Filmed in Technicolor
1941	A Yank in the R.A.F.	Tim Baker	Henry King	
1942	Son of Fury: The Story of Benjamin Blake	Benjamin Blake	John Cromwell	Originally released with sepiatone sequences.
1942	This Above All	Clive Briggs	Anatole Litvak	
1942	The Black Swan	Jamie Waring	Henry King	Filmed in Technicolor.
1943	Crash Dive	Lt. Ward Stewart	Archie Mayo	Filmed in Technicolor. Power's last film before serving in the Marines during World War II.
1946	The Razor's Edge	Larry Darrell	Edmund Goulding	
1947	Nightmare Alley	Stanton Carlisle	Edmund Goulding	Filmed after but released before Captain From Castile.
1947	Captain from Castile	Pedro De Vargas	Henry King	Filmed in Technicolor.
1948	The Luck of the Irish	Stephen Fitzgerald	Henry Koster	Originally released with green tinted sequences.
1948	That Wonderful Urge	Thomas Jefferson Tyler	Robert B. Sinclair	Remake of Love is News (1937).
1949	Prince of Foxes	Andrea Orsini	Henry King	
1950	What's My Line	Himself/Mystery Guest	N/A	First television appearance.
1950	The Black Rose	Walter of Gurnie	Henry Hathaway	
1950	American Guerrilla in the Philippines	Ensign Chuck Palmer	Fritz Lang	Aka I Shall Return (UK). Filmed in Technicolor.
1951	Rawhide	Tom Owens	Henry Hathaway	Aka Desperate Siege.
1951	The House in the Square	Peter Standish	Roy Ward Baker	Aka I'll Never Forget You (US). Filmed in Technicolor.
1952	Diplomatic Courier	Mike Kells	Henry Hathaway	
1952	Pony Soldier	Constable Duncan MacDonald	Joseph M. Newman	Aka MacDonald of the Canadian Mounties (UK). Filmed in Technicolor.
1953	The Mississippi Gambler	Mark Fallon	Rudolph Maté	Filmed in Technicolor.
1953	King of the Khyber Rifles	Capt. Alan King	Henry King	Filmed in CinemaScope and color by Deluxe.
1955	The Long Gray Line	Martin "Marty" Maher	John Ford	Filmed in CinemaScope and Technicolor.
1955	Untamed	Paul Van Riebeck	Henry King	Filmed in CinemaScope and color by Deluxe.
1956	The Eddy Duchin Story	Eddy Duchin	George Sidney	Filmed in CinemaScope and Technicolor.
1957	Seven Waves Away	Alec Holmes	Richard Sale	Aka Abandon Ship!
1957	The Sun Also Rises	Jacob "Jake" Barnes	Henry King	Filmed in CinemaScope and color by Deluxe.
1957	The Rising of the Moon	Himself	John Ford	Three short stories introduced by Power.
1957	Witness for the Prosecution	Leonard Vole	Billy Wilder	Power's last completed film.
1959	Solomon and Sheba	Solomon	King Vidor	Power died during the production and was replaced by Yul Brynner.

=== Box office ranking ===
- 1938 - 10th
- 1939 - 2nd
- 1940 - 5th
- 1941 - 11th
- 1942 - 13th
- 1943 - 14th, 9th (UK)
- 1947 - 20th

== Career Appraisal ==
When Tyrone Power left 20th Century Fox in 1952 he said that his favorite movie made at the studio was Nightmare Alley "but the studio did nothing to sell it and it wasn't a success." He said his most popular movies were Alexander's Ragtime Band, Jesse James, The Mark of Zorro and Blood and Sand. His least favorite were Day-Time Wife, Prince of Foxes, Captain from Castile and Rose of Washington Square.

== Bibliography ==
- Belafonte, Denis, and Alvin H. Marill. The Films of Tyrone Power. New York, NY. Citadel Press, 1979.
