= Henry Rowland (actor) =

American actor (1913–1984)

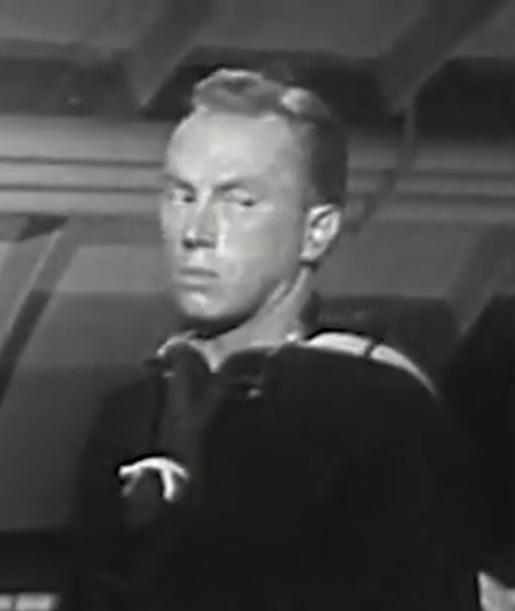
- Rowland in That Nazty Nuisance (1942)
- Born: Heinrich Wilhelm von Bock; September 24, 1913; Omaha, Nebraska, U.S.
- Died: April 26, 1984 (aged 70); Northridge, California, U.S.
- Resting place: Los Angeles National Cemetery
- Other names: Henry Roland; Cpl. Henry Rowland
- Years active: 1940–1979
- Relatives: Fedor von Bock (great-uncle)

Henry Rowland (born Heinrich Wilhelm von Bock; December 28, 1913 – April 26, 1984) was an American actor. Of German descent and partly raised in Bonn, he became known for playing Nazi soldiers and officers during World War II, appearing alongside German and Austrian expatriate actors. Post-war, he had a lengthy career playing character roles in film and television, appearing in over 200 film and television productions.

== Early life ==
Rowland was born Heinrich Wilhelm von Bock in Omaha, Nebraska, to German parents. Originally from Bonn, his father was a professor of German at the University of Nebraska Omaha. His great-uncle was Fedor von Bock, a Wehrmacht field marshal.

Following the First World War, Rowland was sent to Germany for his secondary education. After completing gymnasium, Rowland moved to California to study in Pasadena.

During World War II, Rowland served in the United States Army Air Forces.

== Career ==
Rowland "heiled" and "achtunged" his way through a variety of films, ranging from Casablanca to Russ Meyer's Supervixens. His fluency in the German language made him an ideal choice to play Nazi soldiers and officers during the Second World War. Conversely, he showed up as an American flight surgeon in 1944's Winged Victory, billed under his Army rank as 'Corporal Henry Rowland.' In his last years, Rowland had continued playing such Germanic characters as the Amish farmer in The Frisco Kid (1979).

He appeared six times on the western series Annie Oakley, starring Gail Davis and Brad Johnson. He was also cast in the television series Brave Eagle, Fury, The Lone Ranger, Zorro, The Rifleman, Tales of Wells Fargo (episode "Laredo"), and Gunsmoke.

== Honors ==
For his contribution to the television industry, Rowland has a star on the Hollywood Walk of Fame at 6328 Hollywood Boulevard.

== Death ==
Rowland died on April 26, 1984 at the age of 70. He was buried in Los Angeles National Cemetery.

== Partial filmography ==
=== Film ===
- Safari (1940) – Steersman
- Escape (1940) – Hotel Bellhop (uncredited)
- Underground (1941) – Paul, Underground Member on Motorcycle (uncredited)
- International Squadron (1941) – German (uncredited)
- A Yank in the R.A.F. (1941) – German Soldier (uncredited)
- Dangerously They Live (1941) – Telegraph Operator (uncredited)
- Captains of the Clouds (1942) – German Pilot (uncredited)
- Ship Ahoy (1942) – Operator Contacting Submarine (uncredited)
- Pacific Rendezvous (1942) – Elevator Operator at Park Hotel (uncredited)
- The Phantom Plainsmen (1942) – Lindrick
- The Pied Piper (1942) – MP
- Berlin Correspondent (1942) – Pilot
- Desperate Journey (1942) – German Fighter Pilot (uncredited)
- Hitler – Dead or Alive (1942) – Col. Hecht's Subordinate (uncredited)
- Casablanca (1942) – German Officer (uncredited)
- Reunion in France (1942) – Sentry (uncredited)
- The Moon Is Down (1943) – Capt. Loft
- Edge of Darkness (1943) – Helmut (uncredited)
- That Nazty Nuisance (1943) – Nazi Submarine Radio Officer (uncredited)
- Appointment in Berlin (1943) – Radio Operator (uncredited)
- First Comes Courage (1943) – Private (uncredited)
- Sahara (1943) – Captured German Private (uncredited)
- Paris After Dark (1943) – Capt. Franck
- The Desert Song (1943) – German Officer (uncredited)
- Resisting Enemy Interrogation (1944) – German Sgt. Renser (uncredited)
- Winged Victory (1944) – Flight Surgeon
- 13 Rue Madeleine (1946) – Gestapo Man with Kuncel (uncredited)
- Rendezvous 24 (1946) – Otto Manfred
- The Searching Wind (1946) – Capt. Hetderbreck (uncredited)
- Gallant Journey (1946) – Cornelius Rheinlander (uncredited)
- Dangerous Millions (1946) – Leo Turkan
- 13 Rue Madeleine (1946) – Gestapo Man with Kuncel (uncredited)
- Golden Earrings (1947) – SS Trooper Pfeiffer (uncredited)
- To the Victor (1948) – Hermann Zinzer
- I, Jane Doe (1948) – German Lieutenant (uncredited)
- Rogues' Regiment (1948) – Erich Otto Heindorf
- Battleground (1949) – German NCO (uncredited)
- Port of New York (1949) – Sam Harris (uncredited)
- Bells of Coronado (1950) – Foreign Smuggler (uncredited)
- The Showdown (1950) – Dutch
- King Solomon's Mines (1950) – Traum – Safari Client (uncredited)
- Up Front (1951) – Observer Krausmeyer (uncredited)
- The House on Telegraph Hill (1951) – Sergeant, Interpreter (uncredited)
- Sealed Cargo (1951) – First Mate Anderson (uncredited)
- Ten Tall Men (1951) – Kurt
- Zombies of the Stratosphere (1952, Serial) – Dapper Gangster on Plane [Ch. 4] (uncredited)
- Wagon Team (1952) – Mike McClure
- Operation Secret (1952) – Fritz – German MP (uncredited)
- Wyoming Roundup (1952) – Bill Howard
- Thunderbirds (1952) – German Gunner (uncredited)
- Jungle Drums of Africa (1953) – Kurgan
- Prince of Pirates (1953) – Greb
- Rebel City (1953) – Hardy
- Siren of Bagdad (1953) – Bandit Raider (uncredited)
- Topeka (1953) – Cheated Gambler
- Gun Fury (1953) – Second Poker Player (uncredited)
- All the Brothers Were Valiant (1953) – Jones
- Vigilante Terror (1953) – Mayor Winch
- Captain John Smith and Pocahontas (1953) – Turnbull
- El Alaméin (1953) – Nazi Officer
- Wyoming Renegades (1954) – Elza Lay
- Fireman Save My Child (1954) – Fireman (uncredited)
- Return to Treasure Island (1954) – Williams
- Ring of Fear (1954) – Lunch Counter Proprietor (uncredited)
- The Gambler from Natchez (1954) – Gottwald (uncredited)
- Two Guns and a Badge (1954) – Jim Larkin – Outlaw
- Prince of Players (1955) – Sergeant (uncredited)
- The Fast and the Furious (1955) – Motorist in Park
- Untamed (1955) – Rider (uncredited)
- East of Eden (1955) – Helper at Boxcar (uncredited)
- The Man from Bitter Ridge (1955) – Townsman (uncredited)
- Kiss of Fire (1955) – Acosta
- Bobby Ware Is Missing (1955) – Construction Foreman (uncredited)
- Illegal (1955) – Jailer (uncredited)
- The Spoilers (1955) – Cole (uncredited)
- Uranium Boom (1956) – Harry
- Attack (1956) – German with Binoculars
- The White Squaw (1956) – Cowhand (uncredited)
- Friendly Persuasion (1956) – O'Hara (uncredited)
- The Women of Pitcairn Island (1956) – Muskie
- Hot Shots (1956) – Karl
- Kelly and Me (1957) – Grip (uncredited)
- The Big Land (1957) – Kurt (uncredited)
- The Girl in the Kremlin (1957) – Policeman (uncredited)
- Gun Duel in Durango (1957) – Roy
- Shoot-Out at Medicine Bend (1957) – Farmer (uncredited)
- Hell on Devil's Island (1957) – Guard #1 (uncredited)
- Chicago Confidential (1957) – Milt the Bartender (uncredited)
- Looking for Danger (1957) – Sgt. Wetzel
- My Man Godfrey (1957) – Ship Manifest Officer (uncredited)
- The Young Lions (1958) – Sergeant (uncredited)
- The Beast of Budapest (1958) – Radio Voice (voice, uncredited)
- The Left Handed Gun (1958) – Man on Street with Deputy (uncredited)
- The Case Against Brooklyn (1958) – Police Desk Sgt. (uncredited)
- Street of Darkness (1958) – Inspector
- Official Detective (1958) "Hired Killer" – Finch (uncredited)
- Imitation General (1958) – German Tank Commander #1 (uncredited)
- Me and the Colonel (1958) – German Captain (uncredited)
- Wolf Larsen (1958) – Henderson
- Toby Tyler (1960) – Circus Cook (uncredited)
- Man on a String (1960) – German Radio Dispatcher (uncredited)
- Seven Ways from Sundown (1960) – Sam (uncredited)
- Four Horsemen of the Apocalypse (1962) – Gestapo Officer (uncredited)
- 36 Hours (1964) – German Soldier
- Morituri (1965) – Crew Member (uncredited)
- Beyond the Valley of the Dolls (1970) – Otto
- The Seven Minutes (1971) – Yerkes' Butler
- Diamonds Are Forever (1971) – Dr. Tynan (uncredited)
- Supervixens (1975) – Martin Bormann
- Beneath the Valley of the Ultra-Vixens (1979) – Martin Bormann
- The Frisco Kid (1979) – 1st Farmer – Amish Man

=== Television ===
Year	Title	Role	Notes
1953	Death Valley Days	Fred	Season 1, Episode 12, "Swamper Ike"
1960	The Rebel	Jake Rollins	Episode "The Unwanted"
1964	Gunsmoke	Frank	Episode "Trip West" (S9E31)
