= Bobby Watson (actor) =

American actor (1888–1965)

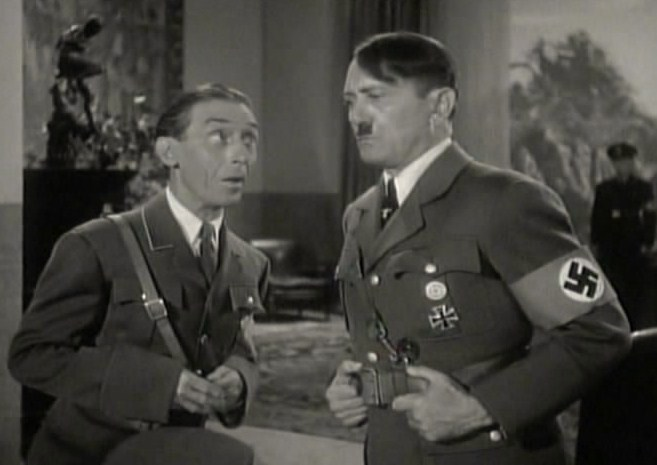
- Watson (right) with Charley Rogers in That Nazty Nuisance (1943)
- Born: Robert Watson Knucher; November 28, 1888; Springfield, Illinois, U.S.
- Died: May 22, 1965 (aged 76); Los Angeles, California, U.S.
- Burial place: Oak Ridge Cemetery
- Occupation: Actor
- Years active: 1925–1962

Bobby Watson (born Robert Watson Knucher; November 28, 1888 – May 22, 1965) was an American theater and film actor, playing a variety of character roles, including, after 1942, Adolf Hitler.

== Life and career ==
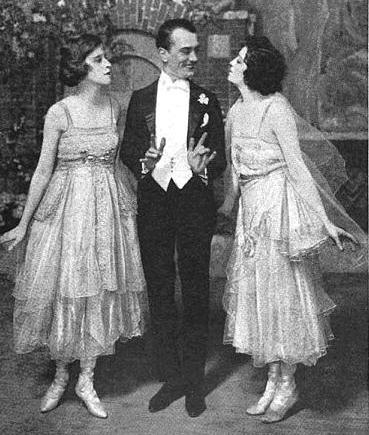
Gladys Miller, Bobby Watson and Eva Puck in Tuneful “Irene”

Born in Springfield, Illinois, Watson, who was of German descent, began his career at age 15 performing a vaudeville act at the Olympic Theatre in Springfield. As a teenager, he toured the U.S. midwest with the "Kickapoo Remedies Show", a traveling medicine show. He then appeared on Coney Island in a Gus Edwards show. In 1918, he first played on Broadway when he was a replacement in the role of Robert Street in Going Up and then created the role of the flamboyant dressmaker "Madame Lucy" in the hit musical Irene (1919), later repeating the role. He continued to play on Broadway through the 1920s.

Watson began to appear in films in 1925, playing various character roles. Some of them were inspired by his scene-stealing characterization from Irene -- the gag roles of fey choreographers, prissy interior decorators, and delicate couturiers fell to Bobby Watson. But he proved his versatility by playing professional men and officious types: military officers, hotel managers, detectives, carnival barkers, and manservants. Today's audiences know him as the enthusiastic diction coach in Singin' in the Rain (1952) and Fred Astaire's butler in The Band Wagon (1953).

Watson also wrote for, and performed on, radio programs.

== As Hitler ==
Watson bore a resemblance to Adolf Hitler, which he played for laughs in a pair of wartime Hal Roach burlesques, The Devil with Hitler (1942) and Nazty Nuisance (1943). This typecast him as the dictator for a time; Watson would appear as Hitler in nine films altogether. He starred in one feature film, Paramount's The Hitler Gang (1944), a serious dramatization of Nazi politics, with the actor billed as Robert Watson. Watson also impersonated Hitler in Hitler – Dead or Alive (1942), The Miracle of Morgan's Creek (1944), A Foreign Affair (1948), The Story of Mankind (1957), On the Double (1961), and Four Horsemen of the Apocalypse (1962).

== Death ==
Watson died in Los Angeles in 1965 at age 76. He is buried in the Oak Ridge Cemetery in Springfield, Illinois.

== Selected filmography ==
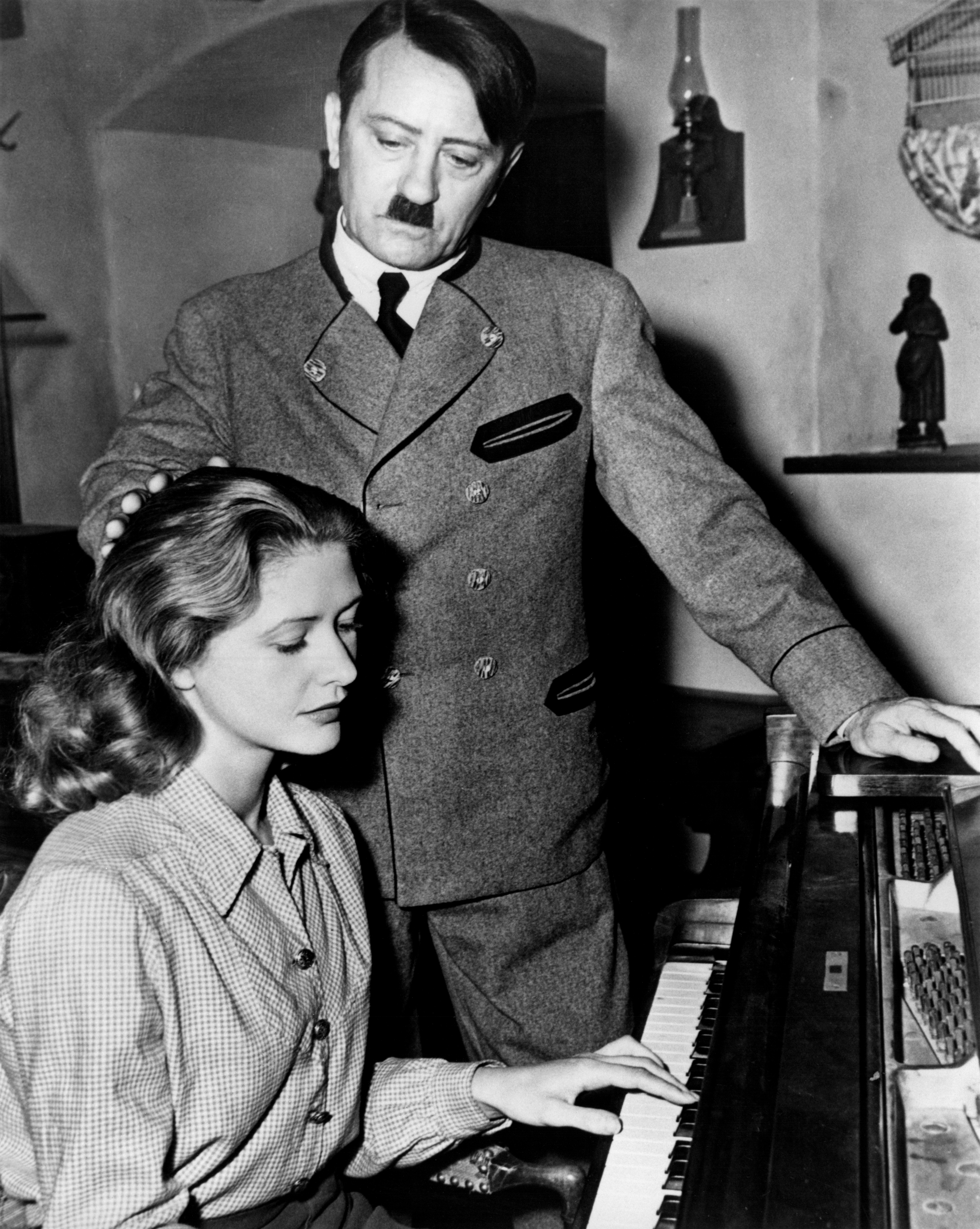
Robert Watson as Adolf Hitler and Poldi Dur as Geli Raubal in The Hitler Gang (1944)

- That Royle Girl (1925) - Hoofer
- The Song and Dance Man (1926) - Fred Carroll
- The Romance of a Million Dollars (1926) - The Detective
- Syncopation (1929, co-star) - Benny Darrell
- Follow the Leader (1930) - George White
- Manhattan Parade (1931) - Paisley
- High Pressure (1932) - The Baron (uncredited)
- Wine, Women and Song (1933) - Lawrence
- Moonlight and Pretzels (1933) - Bertie
- Going Hollywood (1933) - Thompson
- Fugitive Lovers (1934) - Eddie (uncredited)
- Hips, Hips, Hooray! (1934) - Dance director (uncredited)
- This Side of Heaven (1934) - Mr. Worthington - Interior decorator (uncredited)
- The Countess of Monte Cristo (1934) - Hotel valet
- Glamour (1934) - Dance director (uncredited)
- I Hate Women (1934) - Ducky
- Hide-Out (1934) - Master of ceremonies (uncredited)
- Death on the Diamond (1934) - Game Radio Announcer (uncredited)
- The Gay Bride (1934) - Car Salesman (uncredited)
- The Band Plays On (1934) - Radio Announcer (uncredited)
- Society Doctor (1935) - Albright
- The Flame Within (1935) - Detective Cap (uncredited)
- The Murder Man (1935) - Carey Booth
- China Seas (1935) - Man on dock with McCaleb (uncredited)
- Streamline Express (1935) - Gerald Wilson
- Small Town Girl (1936) - Minor role (uncredited)
- Libeled Lady (1936) - Waif (uncredited)
- All American Chump (1936) - Luke Mitchell (uncredited)
- Born to Dance (1936) - Costume designer / assistant stage manager (uncredited)
- After the Thin Man (1936) - Leader of late crowd (uncredited)
- Dangerous Number (1937) - Orchestra leader (uncredited)
- Ready, Willing, and Able (1937) - Tenant (uncredited)
- Song of the City (1937) - Waiter (uncredited)
- As Good as Married (1937) - Jewelry salesman (uncredited)
- Captains Courageous (1937) - Reporter (uncredited)
- Love in a Bungalow (1937) - Barker
- Bad Guy (1937) - operator of Marko game (uncredited)
- That's My Story (1937) - Barker for electric chair(uncredited)
- A Girl with Ideas (1937) - Vendor (uncredited)
- The Adventurous Blonde (1937) - Mugsy
- Hollywood Hotel (1937) - Casting assistant (uncredited)
- You're a Sweetheart (1937) - Prosecutor in production number (uncredited)
- The Kid from Texas (1939) - Announcer of polo match (uncredited)
- Lucky Night (1939) - Orchestra leader at George's (uncredited)
- Coast Guard (1939) - Desk clerk (uncredited)
- Everything's on Ice (1939) - French
- Hero for a Day (1939) - Stranger (uncredited)
- Kid Nightingale (1939) - Oscar, service station operator (uncredited)
- The Ghost Comes Home (1940) - Waldo (uncredited)
- Secrets of a Model (1940) - Stuart Bannerman
- Harvard, Here I Come! (1941) - Horace (uncredited)
- The Devil With Hitler (1942, Short) - Adolf Hitler
- Hitler – Dead or Alive (1942) - Adolf Hitler
- It Ain't Hay (1943) - Clerk
- That Nazty Nuisance (1943) - Adolf Hitler
- The Miracle of Morgan's Creek (1944) - Adolf Hitler (uncredited)
- The Hitler Gang (1944) - Adolf Hitler
- Henry Aldrich's Little Secret (1944) - Man from milk company (uncredited)
- Duffy's Tavern (1945) - Masseur
- Hold That Blonde (1945) - Edwards, butler
- Night and Day (1946) - Director (uncredited)
- The Big Clock (1948) - Morton Spaulding
- A Foreign Affair (1948) - Adolf Hitler (uncredited)
- Beyond Glory (1948) - First detective (uncredited)
- The Paleface (1948) - Toby Preston
- Red, Hot and Blue (1949) - Barney Stratum (uncredited)
- Copper Canyon (1950) - Bixby
- G.I. Jane (1951) - Colonel
- Singin' in the Rain (1952) - diction coach in the "Moses Supposes" number
- The Band Wagon (1953) - Bobby, butler (uncredited)
- No Escape (1953) - Claude Duffy
- Deep in My Heart (1954) - Florist (uncredited)
- He Laughed Last (1956) - Nightclub choreographer (uncredited)
- The Story of Mankind (1957) - Adolf Hitler
- The High Cost of Loving (1958) - Marvin Phyffe (uncredited)
- On the Double (1961) - Adolf Hitler (uncredited)
- Four Horsemen of the Apocalypse (1962) - Adolf Hitler (uncredited) (final film role)
