= That Nazty Nuisance =

1943 film by Glenn Tryon

- Directed by: Glenn Tryon
- Written by: Earle Snell (original screenplay) & Clarence Marks (original screenplay)
- Produced by: Glenn Tryon
- Starring: See below
- Cinematography: Robert Pittack
- Edited by: Bert Jordan
- Music by: Edward Ward
- Release date: May 28, 1943
- Running time: 43 minutes
- Country: United States
- Language: English

That Nazty Nuisance is a 1943 American featurette that was one of Hal Roach's Streamliners and directed by Glenn Tryon. The film is also known as Double Crossed Fool (international TV title) and The Last Three. It is a sequel to The Devil with Hitler.

== Plot ==
Germany's Führer Adolf Hitler embarks on a secret journey to the oriental country of Norom to negotiate a treaty with the blood-thirsty High Chief Paj Mub, mostly because Paj Mub insists on meeting Hitler personally instead of making relations through Hitler's emissary, Kapitän von Popoff. However, despite Hitler's insistence that they shouldn't be told and Goebbels' efforts to mislead them, his Axis partners Benito Mussolini of Italy and General Suki Yaki of Japan unsolicitedly appear at the submarine dock and invite themselves to the trip.

At the same time an American supply ship has just been sunk by a German U-boat, although the crew under their skipper, Captain Spense, escape in a lifeboat. They incidentally land on Norom, where they discover the High Chief's camp, and as Seaman Benson does some reconnaissance, he meets Kela, the young female assistant to an alcoholic magician, who tells him that her master was hired by Paj Mub for an exclusive performance in honor of Hitler's upcoming reception. Benson spontaneously hits upon the plan to impersonate the magician and sneaks into the camp, where Kela instructs him in the use of the magician's props. At the same time, Spense and the rest of his men witness Hitler arriving and disembarking at the island (although they do not recognize him from the distance), and decide to investigate.

Forewarned by Popoff not to displease the High Chief (lest they lose not only the treaty opportunity, but perhaps also their heads), Hitler and his partners meet Paj Mub, who invites them to dinner before he will sign the treaty. However, Benson does his best to ruin the meeting: first, by spiking the served soup with pepper (this results in Hitler and Suki Yaki finding it unpalatable, while Mussolini thinks it bland), then switching the guests' wine with kerosene. Benson as the magician is then brought in and demonstrates the magic trunk illusion, switching Kela for himself. The Paj Mub likes it and insists that one of the three Axis partners go into the box next. Hitler refuses on the grounds that he likes his appearance, and Mussolini begs off due to his girth, so Suki Yaki goes into the trunk. There, he accidentally gets knocked unconscious by Kela, who is trying to fend off an orang-utan who discovered the tunnel under the trunk. Because of this, the ape takes Kela's intended place in the trick, greatly amusing the Paj Mub. He agrees to sign the contract, but as "Suki Yaki" is supposed to sign before the High Chief, the ape squirts Hitler and Mussolini with ink, prompting Paj Mub to consider signing the treaty the next morning and sticking the ape in the same tent as his foreign guests for the night.

As the festivities take place, Spense and his men capture the submarine which brought the Axis leaders to Norom. While investigating the High Chief's camp soon afterwards, Spense runs into Benson, who reveals to him the presence of the three most important Axis leaders on this island. Carrying on his plan, Benson wakes Suki Yaki from his unconsciousness and, with the general's help, manages to convince Hitler and Mussolini that Paj Mub intends to betray them. After making it back to the submarine, Hitler demonstrates his gratitude to Benson by punching him off the vessel, but he is surreptitiously pulled out of the water by his crewmates, who keep themselves hidden from the Axis leaders as they enter the boat for the return journey.

As the submarine is underway, the radio operator receives a message that an Allied refugee ship was torpedoed and its passengers massacred, lifting Hitler's mood. Enraged, Benson attempts to teach Hitler a hard lesson, but Spense prevents him from doing so, citing the Geneva Convention's clause of prisoner of war treatment. Benson relents from employing force, but then locks Hitler's cabin door and falsely announces through the intercom that the submarine is sinking, sending the Axis leaders into hysterics for a while, before he cheerfully reveals the Americans' presence on the boat.

Popoff has in the meantime gone mad from Hitler's promise of getting shot for his supposed failure with Paj Mub. He smashes the sub's navigation instruments when he is left unattended, leaving the sailors blind in the sea. The sub runs aground, nose in the air, at the shore of a tropical island. Thinking that the sub is trapped underwater, the desperate Axis leaders decide to have themselves shot to the surface via the torpedo tubes. The film ends with Benson and Spense beholding Hitler, Suki Yaki and Mussolini being stuck headfirst in the island beach's sands, with their feet treading empty air.

== Cast ==
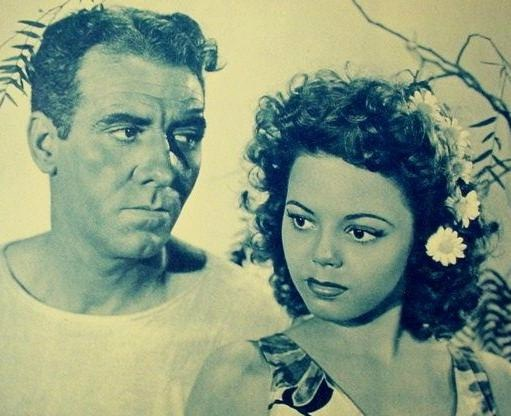
Frank Faylen and Jean Porter

- Bobby Watson as Adolf Hitler
- Joe Devlin as Benito Mussolini
- Johnny Arthur as Suki Yaki
- Frank Faylen as Seaman Benson
- Emory Parnell as Capt. Spense
- Jean Porter as Kela, the Magician's assistant
- Ian Keith as Chief Paj Mub
- Henry Victor as Kapitän von Popoff
- Ed Lewis as Paj Mub's Guard
- 'King Kong' Kashey as Paj Mub's Guard #2
- Rex Evans as Hermann Göring
- Charley Rogers as Joseph Goebbels
- Jiggs the Monkey as The Monkey
- Wedgwood Nowell as Heinrich Himmler
- Henry Rowland as German radio operator
