= Mr. District Attorney (1947 film) =

1947 film by Robert B. Sinclair

- Marguerite Chapman and Adolphe Menjou
- Directed by: Robert B. Sinclair
- Screenplay by: Ian McLellan Hunter; Ben Markson (adaptation)
- Story by: Sidney Marshall
- Produced by: Samuel Bischoff
- Starring: Dennis O'Keefe; Adolphe Menjou; Marguerite Chapman
- Cinematography: Bert Glennon; Henry Freulich (uncredited)
- Edited by: William A. Lyon
- Music by: Herschel Burke Gilbert
- Color process: Black and white
- Production company: Columbia Pictures
- Distributed by: Columbia Pictures
- Release date: February 20, 1947
- Running time: 82 minutes
- Country: United States
- Language: English

Mr. District Attorney is a 1947 American film noir crime film directed by Robert B. Sinclair and starring Dennis O'Keefe, Adolphe Menjou and Marguerite Chapman. The film was the second based on popular radio series Mr. District Attorney created by Phillips Lord. It follows a short series begun in 1941 with a film of the same name.

== Plot ==
An assistant district attorney becomes involved with a woman who works for the group that he is investigating.

== Cast ==
- Dennis O'Keefe as Steve Bennett
- Adolphe Menjou as Craig Warren
- Marguerite Chapman as Marcia Manning
- Michael O'Shea as Harrington
- George Coulouris as James Randolph
- Jeff Donnell as Miss Miller
- Steven Geray as Berotti
- Ralph Morgan as Ed Jamison
- John Kellogg as Franzen

== Bibliography ==
- Blottner, Gene. Columbia Noir: A Complete Filmography, 1940–1962. McFarland, 2015.
