= Poldi Dur =

Austrian dancer and stage actress

- Born: Elisabeth Handl; 29 October 1917; Vienna, Austro-Hungarian Empire
- Died: 27 March 1996 (aged 78); Beverly Hills, California, United States
- Occupations: Actress, Dancer
- Years active: 1934–1944 (film)

Poldi Dur (1917–1996) was an Austrian dancer and stage actress. She also appeared in several films. She was born in Vienna as Elisabeth Handl.

Dur married the Austrian writer Walter Reisch. Following the 1938 Anchluss they emigrated to the United States.

== Selected filmography ==
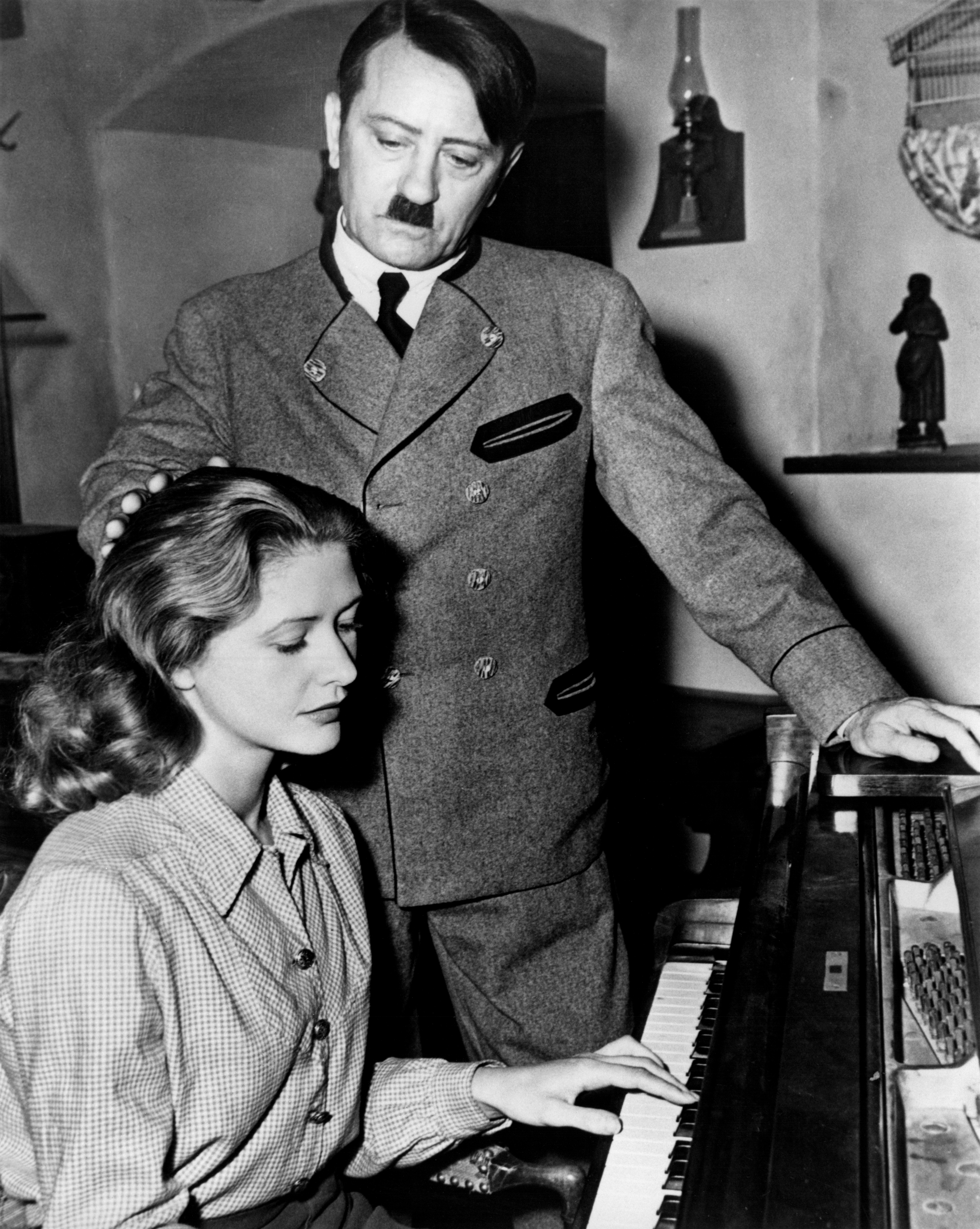
Robert Watson as Adolf Hitler and Poldi Dur as Geli Raubal in The Hitler Gang (1944)

Year	Title	Role	Notes
1934	Masquerade in Vienna	Poldi Dur	
1935	Circus Saran		
1943	They Came to Blow Up America	Helga Lorenz	as Poldy Dur
1943	Margin for Error	Frieda	as Poldy Du
1944	Resisting Enemy Interrogation	Nazi Nurse	uncredited
1944	The Hitler Gang	Geli Raubal	

== Bibliography ==
- Thomas S. Hischak. American Plays and Musicals on Screen: 650 Stage Productions and Their Film and Television Adaptations. McFarland & Company, 2005.
