= Hitler – Dead or Alive =

1942 film by Nick Grinde

Hitler - Dead or Alive
- Theatrical release poster
- Directed by: Nick Grinde
- Written by: Karl Brown
- Screenplay by: Sam Neuman
- Produced by: Ben Judell
- Starring: Ward Bond; Dorothy Tree; Warren Hymer
- Cinematography: Paul Ivano
- Edited by: Jack Dennis
- Music by: Leo Erdody
- Production company: Ben Judell Productions
- Distributed by: Charles House
- Release date: November 12, 1942
- Running time: 70 minutes
- Country: United States
- Language: English

Hitler – Dead or Alive is a 1942 American propaganda war film directed by Nick Grinde. The plot of Hitler – Dead or Alive was inspired by true events but takes a quasi-comic tone. (Note: A news item appearing in the Film Daily noted that Hitler – Dead or Alive was based on an actual offer made by an American businessman, in which he promised a reward of one million dollars to anyone who "would either kill or kidnap Adolf Hitler.")

== Plot ==
In 1939, during the early days of World War II, Samuel Thornton, a prominent American businessman, offers a reward of one million dollars to bring Adolf Hitler to justice, dead or alive. He hires three gangster ex-convicts released from Alcatraz prison, Steve Maschick, Hans "Dutch" Havermann and Joe "The Book" Conway.

The three join the Royal Canadian Air Force and hijack an aircraft flown by Johnny Stevens (Bruce Edwards) to enter German airspace. With Johnny joining them, the group pose as musicians to gain access to Hitler. With the help of Else von Brand, the gangsters capture Hitler and quickly cut his hair and shave off his moustache as SS soldiers try to break the door in. When the SS manage to enter the room, they fail to recognize their leader and drag all the men, including Hitler, outside to be shot.

A desperate Hitler makes a break for it and is shot by the SS officer in charge, who states disdainfully and ironically: "To think that Germany could produce a piece of filth like you." Steve makes a long patriotic speech while facing a firing squad.

== Cast ==
- Ward Bond as Steve Maschick
- Dorothy Tree as Else von Brandt
- Warren Hymer as Hans "Dutch" Havermann
- Paul Fix as Joe "The Book" Conway
- Russell Hicks as Samuel Thornton
- Bruce Edwards as Johnny Stevens
- Felix Basch as Col. Hecht
- Bobby Watson as Adolf Hitler (credited as Bob Watson)
- Frederick Giermann as Meyer
- Kenneth Harlan as Cutler
- Fee Malten as Greta

== Production ==
Principal photography on Hitler – Dead or Alive began on August 6, 1942 at Fine Arts Studios.

== Reception ==
Film historian Alun Evans in Brassey's Guide to War Films, reviewed Hitler – Dead or Alive, comparing and contrasting it to other contemporary features, The Devil with Hitler, (1942), That Nazi Nuisance (1943) and The Hitler Gang (1944). He noted the earlier film was "... (a) Satirical farce about three ex-Alcatraz cons plotting to kill Hitler ..."

Historian M.B.B. Biskupski, in his overview of the treatment of Poles in American war-time cinema, reviewed the film as possibly containing a rare war-time reference to a Polish-American character (Steve Maschik). He noted that the film "may be the worst film made in the World War II era."

== In other media ==
In November 2012, while being interviewed by Playboy magazine, filmmaker Quentin Tarantino admitted the inspiration for his film Inglourious Basterds came from Hitler – Dead or Alive.

== See also ==
- Hitler – Beast of Berlin (1939)
- Hitler's Children (1943)
- The Hitler Gang (1944)
- Man Hunt (1941)
- One Hundred Years of Evil
- The Strange Death of Adolf Hitler (film)
