= The Hitler Gang =

1944 film by John Farrow

- Theatrical release poster
- Directed by: John Farrow
- Written by: Frances Goodrich; Albert Hackett
- Produced by: B. G. DeSylva (executive producer); Joseph Sistrom (associate producer)
- Cinematography: Ernest Laszlo
- Edited by: Eda Warren
- Music by: David Buttolph
- Production company: Paramount Pictures
- Release date: April 26, 1944
- Running time: 101 minutes
- Country: United States
- Language: English

The Hitler Gang is a 1944 American pseudo-documentary film directed by John Farrow, which traces the political rise of Adolf Hitler. Described as a "documentary-propaganda" film by its studio, Paramount Pictures, the historical drama is based on documented fact and marks the first serious effort to portray Hitler in film. The filmmakers chose to avoid casting stars in the lead roles, assembling instead a remarkable company of lookalikes to play Hitler, Goebbels, Himmler, Göring, and other leading Nazis.

== Plot ==
In 1918 a young soldier called Adolf Hitler recovers from being gassed during World War I. At the behest of the German Army, he joins German nationalistic parties, espousing theories that Germany lost the war because they were stabbed in the back. He rises to become dictator of Germany.

== Cast ==
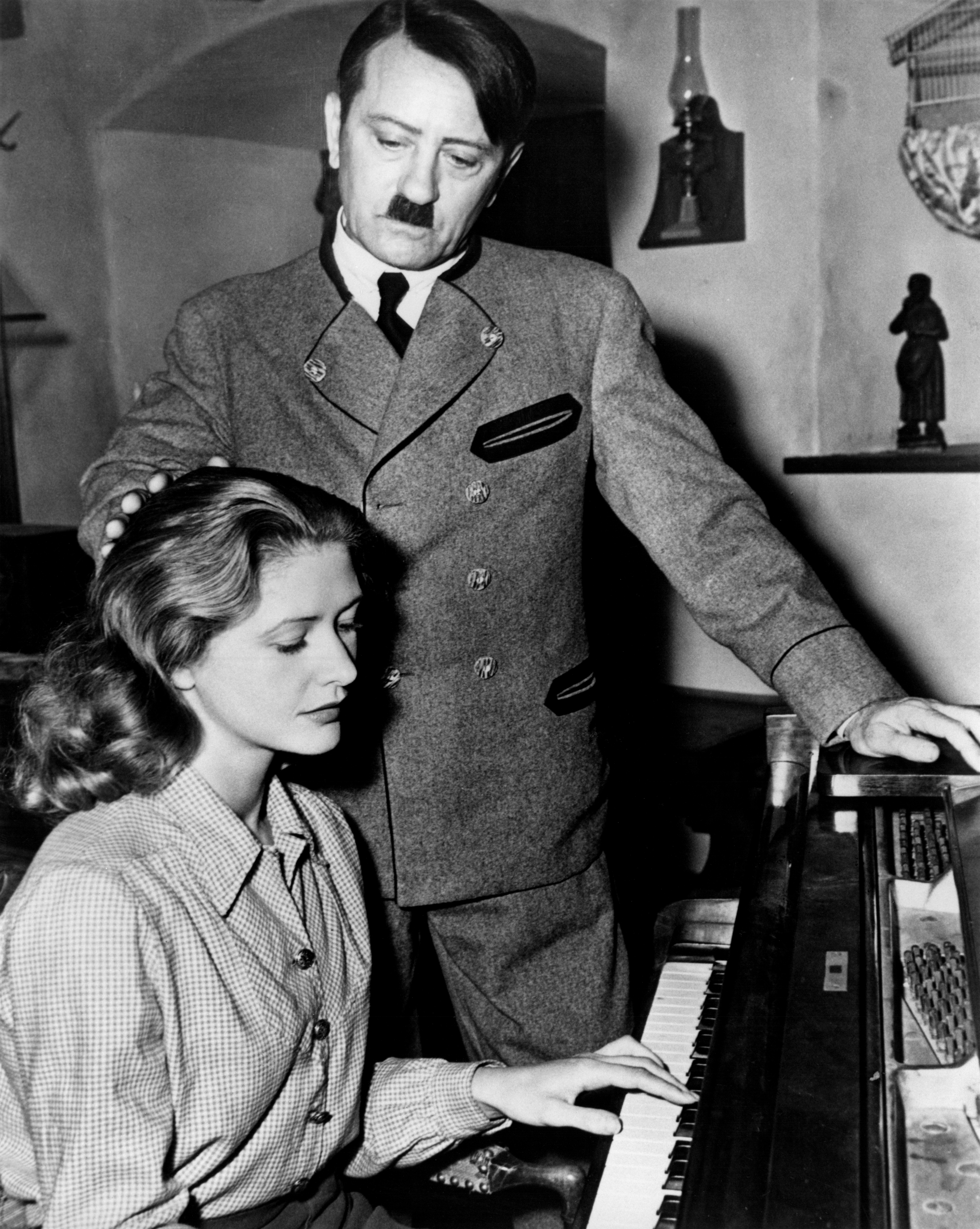
Robert Watson as Adolf Hitler and Poldi Dur as Geli Raubal in The Hitler Gang

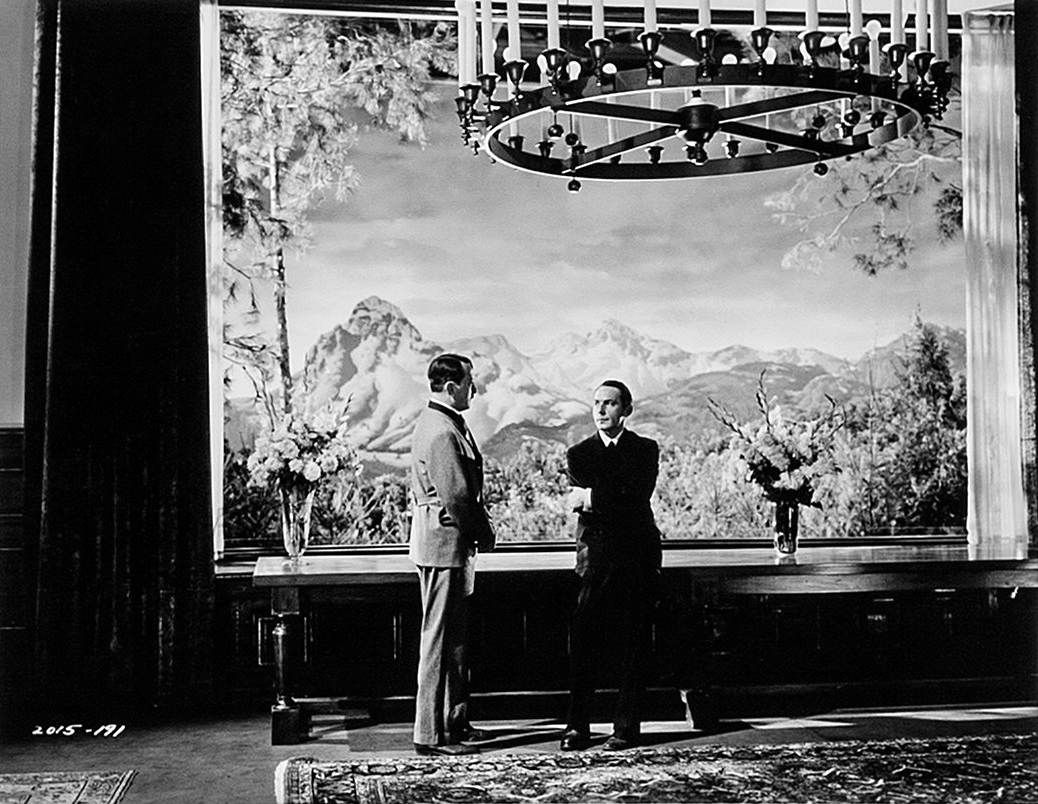
Robert Watson as Hitler and Martin Kosleck as Joseph Goebbels

Walter Abel and Albert Dekker narrate The Hitler Gang.

- Robert Watson as Adolf Hitler
- Roman Bohnen as Captain Ernst Röhm
- Martin Kosleck as Joseph Goebbels
- Victor Varconi as Rudolf Hess
- Luis van Rooten as Heinrich Himmler
- Alexander Pope as Hermann Göring
- Ivan Triesault as Pastor Niemöller
- Poldi Dur as Geli Raubal
- Helene Thimig as Angela Raubal
- Reinhold Schünzel as General Erich Ludendorff
- Sig Ruman as General Paul von Hindenburg
- Alexander Granach as Julius Streicher
- Fritz Kortner as Gregor Strasser
- Tonio Selwart as Alfred Rosenberg
- Richard Ryen as Adolf Wagner
- Ray Collins as Cardinal Faulhaber
- Ludwig Donath as Gustav von Kahr
- Ernő Verebes as Anton Drexler
- Walter Kingsford as Franz von Papen
- Fred Nurney as General von Epp
- Arthur Loft as Colonel von Reichenau
- Lionel Royce as Fritz Thyssen

== Production ==
In 1918 the Germans, facing annihilation, surrendered to the Allies. But there were men among them who did not acknowledge defeat. Before the last shot was fired, they were already planning for the next world war. This is the story of those men. Shocking though it may be, it is based on fact. The episodes throughout are authenticated by documentary records, by the works of reputable historians, and in some instances by actual participants. In every detail it is true insofar as decency will permit.

— Foreword, The Hitler Gang

Paramount Pictures production chief Buddy De Sylva was inspired to make The Hitler Gang after he saw the 1941 Nazi propaganda film, Ohm Krüger. "The Germans did a good job on that picture," De Sylva said. "Their production was excellent, their story was dramatic and though we know the picture is a lie, other peoples may not realize it. What we're doing is taking a different tack. We're telling the true story about Hitler and six other leading German gangsters … We're not going to exaggerate; instead we're going to use understatement on the theory that it will make the picture more realistic still."

Paramount called The Hitler Gang a "documentary-propaganda" film. Pre-production began in March 1943. Extensive research was done to accurately document events, at a cost that exceeded $40,000. Great care was taken to authentically reproduce every detail of German uniforms, medals and weaponry. The screenplay was written by Albert Hackett and Frances Goodrich.

The first serious attempt to portray Hitler in film, The Hitler Gang proved to be a serious historical drama. Robert Watson was an uncanny match for Hitler, and he was surrounded by superlative character actors—many of them immigrants who had fled Nazi Germany.

== Reception ==
The Hitler Gang was recommended by the National Board of Review, which called it "an interesting film purporting to be the real story of Hitler's rise to power and the part played by Roehm, Goebbels, Hess, Himmler, Goering and other Nazis. Many of the well-known historic episodes such as the Munich beer hall putsch, the burning of the Reichstag, and the blood purge of 1934 are dramatically shown. The film is honest in its effort to render an accurate account of the Nazis, but suffers somewhat from an over-simplification of history."

Life magazine featured the film as "Movie of the Week" in its issue dated May 15, 1944. "The Hitler Gang is best when it follows the narrative of history," Life stated. "Its great weakness, however, is that history is still in the process of working out the last act and so the movie has no place to go at the end. … The originality of The Hitler Gang is largely the result of the amazingly lifelike characterizations given by Robert Watson as Hitler, Victor Varconi as Hess, Martin Kosleck as Goebbels and Luis Van Rooten as Himmler."

"There is little point in considering The Hitler Gang as entertainment in the accepted cinema sense," wrote a contributor to The New York Times, which regarded the film as a work of propaganda. "As the most complete pictorial documentation we have to date on the birth and growth of Nazism, it has a place unique, resisting comparison or qualitative judgment. Those of us, and that is practically all-embracing, who would profit by seeing, close up, the genesis and spread of an ideological virus, would do well to see The Hitler Gang."

Bosley Crowther of The New York Times cautioned that "the emphasis in this picture is so heavily upon the 'Hitler gang' and upon the inside intrigues by which it gained and held its power, that the impression conveyed is that these leaders are entirely responsible for the Nazi state. ... It means that the grave responsibility of the German citizens for what they have allowed has been neatly tossed onto the shoulders of a few ruffians, Army officers and industrialists."

== Cultural references ==
Untitled (The Hitler Gang), a 1944 collage by Kurt Schwitters, incorporates a newspaper advertisement for the film.

Kurt Schwitters incorporated a newspaper advertisement for the film into his 1944 collage Untitled (The Hitler Gang).

== See also ==
- Hitler's Children
- Hitler – Dead or Alive
- The Strange Death of Adolf Hitler (film)
