= Resisting Enemy Interrogation =

- Resisting Enemy Interrogation film
- Directed by: Robert B. Sinclair
- Written by: Harold Medford; Owen Crump
- Produced by: Ronald Reagan
- Starring: Arthur Kennedy; Lloyd Nolan; Don Porter; Craig Stevens; Peter Van Eyck; Carl Esmond
- Narrated by: Lloyd Nolan
- Music by: David Rose
- Production company: United States Army Air Forces First Motion Picture Unit
- Distributed by: U.S. Army Air Forces
- Release date: July 1944
- Running time: 70 minutes, 66 minutes (edited)
- Country: United States
- Languages: English; German

Resisting Enemy Interrogation is a 1944 United States Army docudrama training film, directed by Robert B. Sinclair and written by Harold Medford and Owen Crump. The cast includes Arthur Kennedy, Mel Tormé, Lloyd Nolan, Craig Stevens and Peter Van Eyck. Resisting Enemy Interrogation was intended to train United States Army Air Forces (USAAF) crews to resist interrogation by the Germans.

Resisting Enemy Interrogation received an Academy Award nomination in 1944 for best feature-length documentary.

Resisting Enemy Interrogation

== Plot ==
In 1944, German intelligence strives to find the target of an upcoming raid by the reputed "B-99 bomber". To achieve this end, they interrogate a recently shot-down aircrew from a B-99 reconnaissance mission that was shot down over Italy. The aircrew is sent to Dulag Luft POW camp.

The German officers, commanded by Major von Behn (Carl Esmond) use various methods to discover this information, some of them quite subtle. While interviewing Lieutenant Frank L. Williams, Jr. (Don Porter) and Captain James Spencer (James Seay), the two airmen at first resist any probing for information. Other members of the crew include Sergeant Alfred Mason (Arthur Kennedy) and Sgt. Cooper.

Though no physical brutality is used, the Germans at one point stage a mock execution to scare a prisoner. Another prisoner is subjected to isolation to heighten his fear. Red Cross officers and a nurse (Poldi Dur) use their positions to extract information from the prisoners. Each airman eventually provides useful information because of their arrogance, fear or naivety. Some of what they say, which the enemy finds useful, seems innocuous but is used by the Germans as pieces to solve the larger puzzle.

In the end, the Germans are able to determine the target of the raid and the B-99 bombing mission is intercepted. The intended target is spared heavy damage with 21 B-99s shot down and the loss of 105 aircrew.

The U.S. intelligence officer (Lloyd Nolan), in his briefing to the surviving members of the raid, stresses not talking under any circumstances because of the danger of talking too much; even innocuous conversation can help the enemy. He also says not to let down one's guard, that everything in a prison camp is suspect, and not to try to outwit the enemy.

== Cast ==
All uncredited

- Lloyd Nolan as USAAF Debriefing Officer / Narrator
- Carl Esmond as Major von Behn - Nazi Commandant
- Peter van Eyck as Captain Granach - Young Nazi Officer
- Don Porter as Lieutenant Frank L. Williams, Jr. - American Co-pilot
- Kent Smith as Captain Reining - American working for the Nazis
- Arthur Kennedy as Sergeant Alfred Mason
- James Seay as Captain James N. Spencer
- George Dolenz as Captain Volbricht
- All above confirmed by AFI.
- Mel Tormé as Ralph Cole
- Craig Stevens as B-26 Pilot
- Hans Heinrich von Twardowski as Herr Mahler - German Red Cross Representative
- Poldi Dur as Nazi Nurse
- Steven Geray as Dr. Victor Münz - Camp Doctor
- Louis Adlon as Major Franz Kohmer
- Charles Tannen as Sergeant Freulich - German Prison Plant
- Henry Rowland as German Sergeant Renser
- Rand Brooks as Pilot
- George O'Hanlon as American pilot at Headquarters
- Sam Locke as Nazi
- Otto Reichow as German Prison Guard
- Hans Schumm as German Guard
- Frederic Brunn as German Yard Guard
- Max Wilk as Nazi
- An actor whose identity seems to be unknown plays Sgt. Cooper, the fifth member of the crew

== Production ==
Principal photography for Resisting Enemy Interrogation took place at the Hal Roach Studios. Lloyd Nolan provides the opening narration, and appears at the end of the film as a debriefing officer, after which he speaks directly to the camera, telling airmen to not talk to their captors. Owen Crump, one of the screenwriters, said that the Bavarian chateau that appears in the film was a process shot based on a picture post card. He also reported that two American fliers visiting the Warner Bros. studios after the war said that when they were captured during the war, recognized the building from the film when they were brought in for questioning. This amused them, and they began to laugh, confusing their interrogators.

Stock footage of Douglas A-20 Havoc, Lockheed Hudson, Martin B-26 Marauder and North American B-25 Mitchell bombers were featured in the aerial combat sequence. The German aircraft were a combination of stock footage and models of the Messerschmitt Bf 109 fighters that made the interception.

== Reception ==
Resisting Enemy Interrogation was typical of the military training films of the period produced under the auspices of the Office of War Information. The film was distributed and exhibited by the USAAF primarily to Army Air Force personnel but was later released as a theatrical feature in New York in August 1944.

== Remake ==
In 1950, the film story of Resisting Enemy Interrogation was purchased from Harold Medford to be made into a Universal-International motion picture with a working title of "Prisoner of War." The film, entitled Target Unknown, was released by Universal in 1951 with a screenplay by Medford. It was directed by George Sherman with a cast led by Mark Stevens. The climax of the film is changed to an escape of the prisoners.
