= Wagon Team =

1952 film by George Archainbaud

- Theatrical release poster
- Directed by: George Archainbaud
- Written by: Gerald Geraghty
- Produced by: Armand Schaefer
- Starring: Gene Autry; Gail Davis; Dick Jones; Gordon Jones; Harry Harvey Sr. Henry Rowland
- Cinematography: William Bradford
- Edited by: James Sweeney
- Production company: Gene Autry Productions
- Distributed by: Columbia Pictures
- Release date: September 30, 1952
- Running time: 61 minutes
- Country: United States
- Language: English

Wagon Team is a 1952 American Western film directed by George Archainbaud and written by Gerald Geraghty. The film stars Gene Autry, Gail Davis, Dick Jones, Gordon Jones, Harry Harvey Sr. and Henry Rowland. The film was released on September 30, 1952, by Columbia Pictures.

== Cast ==
- Gene Autry as Gene Autry
- Gail Davis as Connie Weldon
- Dick Jones as Dave Weldon aka The Apache Kid
- Gordon Jones as Marshal Sam Taplin
- Harry Harvey Sr. as Doc Weldon
- Henry Rowland as Mike McClure
- George J. Lewis as Carlos de la Torre
- John Cason as Slim
- Pat Buttram as Deputy Pat Buttram
- Champion as Champ
