= Robert B. Sinclair =

American film director

- from MGM Studio News (1938)
- Born: Robert Bruce Sinclair; May 24, 1905; Toledo, Ohio, US
- Died: January 3, 1970 (aged 64); Montecito, California, US
- Cause of death: Homicide
- Occupation: Movie director
- Spouses: Jane Lamont Buchanan (m. 1934; div. 1941) Heather Angel (m. 1944)

Robert Bruce Sinclair (May 24, 1905 – January 3, 1970) was an American director who worked in film, theater and television.

== Early years ==
Robert Bruce Sinclair was born in Toledo, Ohio, the son of an insurance agent. He attended the University of Pennsylvania and graduated from the Wharton School of Finance and Commerce in 1926. While studying at the University of Pennsylvania, an English professor introduced him to theater and playwright George S. Kaufman.

== Career ==
Sinclair began his career as an assistant stage manager in October 1926 at the Greenwich Village Theater but worked there for less than a fortnight before moving to Cleveland to work at a stock company. He would eventually return to New York and worked his way up to stage manager, although almost every production he worked on was not a success, which led him to publish Why I Am Leaving the Theater, an "excoriation of the commercial stage."

Sinclair became a sports desk editor for The Morning Telegraph and later worked at the Museum of the City of New York before, two years later, his mentor George S. Kaufman lured him back to the theater and he assisted Kaufman with his 1930 production of Once In a Lifetime. Sinclair would direct or stage manage many theater productions, including the directing the original productions of Dodsworth (1934), Pride and Prejudice (1935), The Postman Always Rings Twice (1936), Babes in Arms (1937) and The Philadelphia Story (1939). Sinclair also became involved in film when he worked on Kaufman's 1932 film adaptation of Once in a Lifetime and directed eight films for Metro‐Goldwyn-Mayer between 1938 and 1941.

During World War II, Sinclair was a Captain in the Air Force and directed a training video called Resisting Enemy Interrogation (1944) which received a nomination for best feature-length documentary at the 17th Academy Awards.

In 1947, Sinclair left Metro-Goldwyn-Mayer and directed Mr. District Attorney for Columbia Pictures. The next year, he would direct That Wonderful Urge for 20th Century Fox, which would be his last film.

Sinclair published The Eleventh Hour in 1951, which was his only novel and was nominated for a 1952 Edgar Award for Best First Novel by an American Author.

He would go on to direct episodes of various television series throughout the late 1950s and early 1960s, mostly for Warners Brothers Television, including Telephone Time, Johnny Staccato, 77 Sunset Strip, Hawaiian Eye and The Deputy.

== Personal life ==
Sinclair was married to actress Jane Lamont Buchanan from 1934 to 1941. He moved to Beverly Hills from New York City in 1938. Sinclair married actress Heather Angel on April 15, 1944 in Hollywood. He went into semi-retirement in Montecito in the mid-1960s and led an active social life, especially in theater. He had a son, Anthony Sinclair, with Heather Angel and a stepdaughter, Barbara Benson.

== Murder ==
On January 3, 1970, Sinclair was repeatedly stabbed in the chest by a burglar in his Montecito home and died. The assailant, Billy McCoy Hunter, a graduate student at UCSB, was later arrested and charged with murder. He was found in possession of a bloody knife and a pistol.

== Selected filmography ==
As director

- Woman Against Woman (1938)
- Dramatic School (1938)
- Joe and Ethel Turp Call on the President (1939)
- And One Was Beautiful (1940)
- The Captain Is a Lady (1940)
- The Wild Man of Borneo (1941)
- Rage in Heaven (1941), uncredited
- I'll Wait for You (1941)
- Down in San Diego (1941)
- Mr. and Mrs. North (1942)
- Resisting Enemy Interrogation (1944), nominated for Academy Award for Best Documentary
- Mr. District Attorney (1947)
- That Wonderful Urge (1948)
