= Geli Raubal =

Adolf Hitler's half-niece (1908–1931)

- Born: Angela Maria Raubal; 4 June 1908; Linz, Austria-Hungary
- Died: 18 September 1931 (aged 23); Munich, Germany
- Cause of death: Gunshot wound
- Resting place: Zentralfriedhof, Vienna, Austria
- Education: Ludwig-Maximilians-Universität München (LMU)
- Parents: Leo Raubal; Angela Hitler
- Relatives: Adolf Hitler (half-uncle); Leo Raubal Jr. (brother); Paula Hitler (half-aunt); Alois Hitler Jr. (uncle); William Patrick Hitler (cousin); Heinz Hitler (cousin); Bridget Dowling (aunt)

Angela Maria "Geli" Raubal (German pronunciation: [ˈɡeːli ˈʁaʊbal]; 4 June 1908 – 18 September 1931) was the half-niece of Adolf Hitler. Born in Linz, Austria-Hungary, she was the second child and eldest daughter of Leo Raubal Sr. and Hitler's half-sister, Angela Raubal. Raubal lived in close contact with her half-uncle Adolf from 1925 until her presumed suicide in 1931.

== Life ==
Angela Maria "Geli" Raubal was born in Linz, Austria-Hungary on 4 June 1908, where she was raised with her brother Leo and sister Elfriede. Her father died at the age of 31 when Geli was two. She and Elfriede accompanied their mother when she became Hitler's housekeeper in 1925; Raubal was 17 at the time and spent the next six years in close contact with her half-uncle, who was 19 years her senior. Her mother was given a position as housekeeper at the Berghof (Note: The Berghof was called Haus Wachenfeld until Hitler purchased and expanded the property in 1933.) near Berchtesgaden in 1928. Raubal moved into Hitler's Munich apartment in 1929 when she enrolled in medicine at Ludwig-Maximilians-Universität München (LMU) but she did not complete her studies.

As Hitler rose to power as leader of the Nazi Party, he was domineering and possessive of Raubal, keeping control of her, restricting her movements and social contacts. When he discovered in December 1927 that she was having a relationship with his chauffeur, Emil Maurice, he forced her to end the affair and dismissed Maurice from his service. After that he did not allow her to associate with friends and attempted to have himself or someone he trusted near her at all times, accompanying her on shopping trips, to the cinema and to the opera.

== Death ==
Raubal was living in Hitler's Munich apartment, and he maintained strict control over her actions. She was in effect a prisoner, and planned to escape to Vienna to continue her singing lessons. Her mother told interrogators after the war that Hitler had forbidden her daughter to continue her relationship with a man from Linz whom she was hoping to marry. Hitler and Raubal argued on 18 September 1931, when he refused to allow her to go to Vienna. He departed for a meeting in Nuremberg but was recalled to Munich the next day with the news that Raubal was dead from a gunshot wound to the lung; she had apparently shot herself in Hitler's Munich apartment with Hitler's Walther pistol. She was 23.

Rumours immediately began in the media about physical abuse, a possible sexual relationship, an infatuation by Raubal for her uncle, and even murder. The Münchener Post reported that the dead woman had a fractured nose. Otto Strasser, a political opponent of Hitler, was the source of some of the more sensational stories. The historian Ian Kershaw maintains that "whether actively sexual or not, Hitler's behaviour towards Geli has all the traits of a strong, latent at least, sexual dependence." The police ruled out foul play and the death was ruled a suicide. Hitler was devastated and went into what has been described as an intense depression. He moved to a house on the shores of the Tegernsee and did not attend the funeral in Vienna on 24 September. He visited her grave at Vienna's Zentralfriedhof ('central cemetery') two days later. Thereafter, he is said to have overcome his depression and refocused on politics.

Hitler later declared that Raubal was the only woman he had ever loved according to American journalist William L. Shirer. Her room at Haus Wachenfeld was kept as she had left it, and he hung portraits of her in his room there and at the Reich Chancellery in Berlin.

Further accusations surfaced during and after the Second World War. Otto Strasser, after his defection in 1943, told the U.S. Office of Strategic Services that Raubal had told him of sexual abuse by Hitler in 1931, claiming Hitler had subjected Raubal to sexual fetishes involving urination. Strasser also claimed that the priest who oversaw Raubal's burial had implied her death was not a suicide. Journalist Konrad Heiden, in his 1944 book Der Fuehrer, reported (citing anonymous sources) that Hitler was blackmailed in 1929 over a sexually explicit letter he had written to Raubal which had fallen into the wrong hands, obliging Hitler's associates to pay a large ransom for the letter's return. Hitler associate Ernst Hanfstaengl told a similar story in his 1957 memoir, though he reported that the incident took place in 1930 and that the object of the blackmail was a folio of pornographic sketches of Raubal. Hanfstaengl had supposedly seen these sketches in the possession of Nazi treasurer Franz Xaver Schwarz, who had purchased them from the blackmailer and was taking them to the Brown House for safekeeping. Historians have disputed these claims; for example, Rudolph Binion argues that Heiden and Hanfstaengl exaggerated events to sell books and that Strasser, as an enemy of Hitler, was an unreliable witness. On the other hand, Robert G. L. Waite finds Strasser's statement to be convincing evidence of Hitler's "sexual perversion".

According to her cousin William Stuart-Houston, Hitler's nephew through his half-brother, Alois,

when I visited Berlin in 1931, the family was in trouble. ... Everyone knew that Hitler and she had long been intimate and that she had been expecting a child – a fact that enraged Hitler.

In a 1992 Vanity Fair article, Ron Rosenbaum examines several theories, including speculation that Hitler intentionally or accidentally shot and killed Raubal during an argument, or that she was killed on his orders.

In 2026, historian Harald Sandner discovered that Raubal's death certificate placed the discovery of her body on the morning of 18 September, 24 hours earlier than in the official account, indicating that her death occurred while Hitler was still in the city. Sandner argued that this cast doubt on the official story of Raubal's death, suggesting the Munich police covered up the truth in order to protect Hitler. Sandner's claims were criticized by Hitler historian Heike B. Görtemaker, who argued that the discrepancy was simply a clerical error, pointing out that all eight witnesses to the discovery of Raubal's body stated it occurred on 19 September. Görtemaker also questioned the idea that the Munich police would have conspired to protect Hitler, arguing that the local police chief, an opponent of Hitler, would have taken any opportunity to arrest him.

== Media portrayals ==
- In the 1944 film The Hitler Gang, Geli Raubal was portrayed by Poldi Dur.
- In the 1962 film Hitler, she was portrayed by Cordula Trantow.
- In the 2003 TV miniseries Hitler: The Rise of Evil, she was portrayed by Jena Malone.
- In the 2005 film Uncle Adolf, she was portrayed by Elaine Cassidy.
- Raubal appears in issue #3 of Michael Moorcock's Multiverse and Michael Moorcock's The Metatemporal Detective.
- Raubal appears as a character in Shigeru Mizuki's Hitler.

== See also ==
- Hitler family – Relatives and ancestors of Adolf Hitler

== Bibliography ==
- Fuchs, Thomas (2000). A Concise Biography of Adolf Hitler. New York: Berkley. ISBN 9780425173404.
- Bullock, Alan (1999) [1952]. Hitler: A Study in Tyranny. New York: Konecky & Konecky. ISBN 978-1-56852-036-0.
- Görtemaker, Heike B. (2011). Eva Braun: Life with Hitler. New York: Alfred A. Knopf. ISBN 978-0-307-59582-9.
- Gunther, John (1940). Inside Europe. New York: Harper & Brothers. OCLC 836676034.
- Kershaw, Ian (2000). Hitler, 1889–1936: Hubris. New York: W. W. Norton & Company. ISBN 0-393-32035-9.
- Kershaw, Ian (2008). Hitler: A Biography. New York City: W. W. Norton & Company. ISBN 978-0-393-06757-6. LCCN 2008037294. OCLC 1285564274. OL 22551194M. Wikidata Q138306767.
- Koopmann, Jan-Paul (13 April 2019). "Der Führer aus der Ferne gesehen" [The Führer Seen from Afar]. Der Spiegel (in German). ISSN 2195-1349.
- Luyken, Jörg (23 September 2026). "Hitler may have murdered his niece, new evidence suggests". The Telegraph.
- Mullin, Angela (4 October 2007). "Elaine Cassidy On Her Role In 'Father' Feature". Irish Film and Television Network.
- Robinson, Julian (5 May 2017). "'Why I hate my uncle' - Rare insight into Nazi leader's life by Adolf Hitler's nephew". New Zealand Herald.
- Rosenbaum, Ron (April 1992). "Hitler's Doomed Angel". Vanity Fair.
- Shirer, William Lawrence (1960), The Rise and Fall of the Third Reich: A History of Nazi Germany, New York City: Simon & Schuster, ASIN B0766DKDLR, LCCN 60006729, OCLC 1286630, OL 5794925M, Wikidata Q138029595
- Toland, John (1976). Adolf Hitler. New York; Toronto: Ballantine Books. ISBN 978-0-345-25899-1.
- Speiers, Michael (11 May 2003). "Hitler: The Rise of Evil". Variety.
- Walters, Guy (24 September 2026). "Hitler didn't kill his niece – but his sex life was as twisted as his politics". The Telegraph.
- "Did Hitler Kill His Niece? New Documents Challenge Alibi in Geli Raubal's Mysterious Death". YNet. 23 September 2026.
