= That Wonderful Urge =

1948 film by Robert B. Sinclair

- Directed by: Robert B. Sinclair
- Written by: Jay Dratler
- Produced by: Darryl F. Zanuck; Fred Kohlmar
- Starring: Gene Tierney; Tyrone Power; Reginald Gardiner
- Cinematography: Charles G. Clarke
- Edited by: Louis Loeffler
- Music by: Cyril J. Mockridge
- Production company: 20th Century Fox
- Distributed by: 20th Century Fox
- Release date: December 25, 1948
- Running time: 82 minutes
- Country: United States
- Language: English
- Box office: $1,650,000

That Wonderful Urge is a 1948 American screwball comedy film directed by Robert B. Sinclair and starring Tyrone Power, Gene Tierney and Reginald Gardiner. Produced by 20th Century Fox, it is a remake of Love Is News (1937) which starred Power and Loretta Young.

== Plot ==
Newspaper reporter Thomas Jefferson Tyler writes a series of unflattering articles under the title "The Life and Loves of Sara Farley", infuriating the wealthy grocery-store heiress target of his stories. He impersonates a small-town newspaper manager named Tom Thomas, who is sympathetic to her plight and gets her to talk about herself. He finds her down to earth, and he writes a much different article about her. However, Sara finds out about the deception and tells the press that the two of them got married and that she gave him $1 million. When Duffy, Tom's editor, reads the story, he promptly fires Tom. Hijinks ensue as Tom tries to clear himself. Eventually, he sues Sara for libel, just when she begins to see a different side to him. The case is thrown out of court as a couple's issue. The judge's remarks makes Tom realize his actual feelings for Sara. He goes to Sara's house and waits for her to declare his feelings. It turns out she also has feelings for him. He asks if they were really married. She replies "let's get married again".

== Cast ==
- Gene Tierney as Sara Farley
- Tyrone Power as Thomas Jefferson Tyler
- Reginald Gardiner as Count Andre De Guyon
- Arleen Whelan as Jessica Woods
- Lucile Watson as Aunt Cornelia Farley
- Gene Lockhart as Judge Parker
- Lloyd Gough as Duffy, Chronicle Editor
- Porter Hall as Attorney Ketchell
- Richard Gaines as Whitson - Farley's Executive
- Taylor Holmes as Attorney Rice
- Chill Wills as Homer Beggs, Justice of the Peace in Monroe Township
