= The Devil with Hitler =

- Theatrical release poster
- Directed by: Gordon Douglas
- Written by: Cortland Fitzsimmons (story); Al Martin
- Produced by: Hal Roach, Jr. Glenn Tryon
- Starring: Alan Mowbray; Bobby Watson
- Production company: Hal Roach Studios
- Distributed by: United Artists
- Release date: October 22, 1942
- Running time: 44 minutes
- Country: United States
- Language: English

The Devil with Hitler (released in Great Britain as The Devil Checks Up) is a black-and-white 1942 comedy short propaganda film that was one of Hal Roach's Streamliners short film series. When the board of directors of Hell want Adolf Hitler to take charge, the Devil tries to save his job by making the German dictator perform a good deed.

== Plot ==
In the pits of Hell, the board of directors decides to replace Satan with Adolf Hitler. Satan persuades them to give him 48 hours to save his job by getting Hitler to perform a single good deed.

Satan arranges for Hitler's valet, Julius, to appear to blunder several times, resulting in his replacement. Satan takes his place under the name "Gesatan".

Italian dictator Benito Mussolini and a Japanese representative, Suki Yaki, enter. Mussolini presents Hitler with a miniature airplane which he stole from Suki Yaki, who in turn stole it from the Americans. When Suki Yaki activates the airplane, it goes out of control and eventually strikes Hitler in the rear. After Satan causes more trouble, Hitler orders the execution of his astrologer, Louis, who had promised him a peaceful, quiet day.

He makes Satan his new chief adviser. Satan tells Hitler that he should do one good deed that day, but Hitler has other ideas. He has a bunch of traitors brought in. Insurance salesman Walter Beeter joins the group to try to sell Hitler a policy. When Hitler questions Linda Kraus, an agent sent to spy on the United States, Walter comes to her defense when she refuses to cooperate. Hitler orders the entire group imprisoned to await their execution.

Satan persuades Hitler to get an insurance policy after all, telling him that the money could be used to fund hospitals and retirement homes. However, Hitler buys a policy from Walter for Suki Yaki. The intended victim orders a policy for Mussolini, who purchases life insurance for both Hitler and Suki Yaki. All three men hide alarm clock bombs under each other's pillow, but the bombs are discovered.

Satan impersonates Hitler and releases Walter and Linda, but Hitler finds out and orders them shot by firing squad. Satan convinces everyone that Hitler is the imposter. Hitler is put in front of a firing squad, the same one from which Satan rescued Walter and Linda moments earlier. Suki Yaki and Mussolini pretend not to know him, until he agrees to give them the Pacific and Italy respectively. They chase Satan into a storage room filled with explosives. Satan locks the door, ignites a bomb and gives it to Hitler. Satan gives Hitler the key on condition that he release Walter and Linda. Hitler does so, and Satan returns home to Hell with his position secure. When Hitler arrives in Hell, Satan pays special attention to his punishment.

== Cast ==
- Alan Mowbray as The Devil, also known as "Gesatan"
- Bobby Watson as Adolf Hitler
- George E. Stone as Suki Yaki
- Joe Devlin as Benito Mussolini
- Marjorie Woodworth as Linda Kraus
- Douglas Fowley as Walter Beeter
- Herman Bing as Louis
- Sig Arno as Julius

== Sequel ==
A sequel called That Nazty Nuisance was released the next year.
