= Love Is News =

1937 film by Tay Garnett

- Directed by: Tay Garnett
- Screenplay by: Harry Tugend; Jack Yellen; Allen Rivkin; Wallace Sullivan
- Story by: William R. Lipman; Frederick Stephani
- Produced by: Earl Carroll
- Starring: Tyrone Power; Loretta Young; Don Ameche
- Cinematography: Ernest Palmer
- Edited by: Irene Morra
- Music by: David Buttolph
- Production company: 20th Century Fox
- Distributed by: 20th Century Fox
- Release date: February 26, 1937
- Running time: 77 minutes
- Country: United States
- Language: English

Love Is News is a 1937 American romantic comedy film starring Tyrone Power, Loretta Young, and Don Ameche. The movie was directed by Tay Garnett and was the first film for which Power had top billing. The picture was remade in 1947 as That Wonderful Urge, with Power again and Gene Tierney.

== Plot ==
Stephen "Steve" Leyton (Tyrone Power) is a prying newspaper reporter who works for Martin Canavan (Don Ameche), and he goes after the rich heiress, Antoinette "Tony" Gateson (Loretta Young), to get an exclusive story with her. Annoyed with the articles he has published, and the way Steve has labelled her a "Tin Can Countess", Tony turns on him and announces to the press that they are engaged to each other. All this time, she has an actual fiancé, Count Andre de Guyon (George Sanders).

Steve, thinking that he has a scoop on his hands, calls up Canavan and dictates a story for him to write, but the news that Tony is engaged to Steve upsets the story, and Canavan is angry at Steve, and as a result, fires him. Now finding himself hounded by reporters and hustlers trying to sell their stuff, Steve is at first outraged at Tony and tries to refute the story, but the press does not believe him. Desperate, Steve begs Tony to call off the act, but she refuses, saying that he should experience how it is like to have his every move watched.

Steve chases after her, and Tony's speeding car catches the attention of a police officer. She is arrested and taken to Judge Hart (Slim Summerville), and Steve purposely irritates the judge, convincing him to give Tony a 30-day sentence. Tony tricks Steve by telling him to get her vanity case from the car, and then accusing him of theft. As a result, Steve gets thrown in jail along with Tony. The story catches the attention of the press and Tony's uncle, and Judge Hart is forced to let her go. Before she leaves, Tony pays Steve's fine, and as a result, he is released as well, much against his will.

On the way back, Tony teases Steve and offers him a lift, but he refuses, and Tony fakes a car crash and pretends to be unconscious. Steve picks her up, and throws her into a puddle of mud. By this time, Steve is trying to get his job back, and Tony persuades her uncle to do something about the mess between Steve and Count Andre, who has arrived in New York. Tony's uncle buys a share in the company, and Steve is made editor. Count Andre, having been jilted by Tony, offers to sell their love letters to Steve. Steve buys them, and Tony is upset when she finds out.

Steve walks out from the office when he finds out that he was made editor because of Tony's uncle, and tells the group that has gathered in his office that he put the love letters in the safe. Tony finds a note written by Steve, saying that he destroyed the letters, and she runs after him, finally persuading him that she loves him, and the two kiss in a store, to a cheering crowd watching through the window.

== Cast ==
- Tyrone Power as Stephen "Steve" Leyton, a newspaper reporter who gets tangled up with rich heiress Tony Gateson
- Loretta Young as Antoinette "Tony" Gateson, a rich countess who announces that she is engaged to Steve
- Don Ameche as Martin Canavan, Steve's friend and boss, who is frustrated that his newspaper keeps losing out to others
- Slim Summerville as Judge Hart, a judge from Meadowville who throws both Steve and Tony into jail
- George Sanders as Count Andre de Guyon, Tony's real fiancé
- Dudley Digges as Cyrus Jeffrey, Tony's uncle
- Jane Darwell as Mrs. Flaherty, an old lady who rents a room to Steve
- Pauline Moore as Lois Westcott
- Walter Catlett as Eddie Johnson
- Frank Conroy as A.G. Findlay
- Edwin Maxwell as Kenyon
- Elisha Cook Jr. as Egbert Eggleston

== Radio adaptations ==
Love Is News was presented as a one-hour radio adaptation on Lux Radio Theatre on September 16, 1940. The production starred Bob Hope, Madeleine Carroll and Ralph Bellamy. Love Is News was also presented on Screen Guild Players on June 14, 1943. The 30-minute adaptation starred Jack Benny, Ann Sheridan, and James Gleason. Rita Hayworth was originally scheduled to do the program, but sponsor requirements resulted in a switch to Sheridan.

== Bibliography ==
- Halbout, Grégoire. Hollywood Screwball Comedy 1934-1945: Sex, Love, and Democratic Ideals. Bloomsbury Publishing, 2022.
